= 1945 Birthday Honours =

British government recognitions

The King's Birthday Honours 1945, celebrating the official birthday of King George VI, were announced on 14 June 1945 for the United Kingdom and British Empire.

The recipients of the Birthday Honours are displayed here as they were styled before their new honour, and arranged by honour, with classes (Knight, Knight Grand Cross, etc.) and then divisions (Military, Civil, etc.) as appropriate.

== United Kingdom and British Empire ==
=== Baron ===
- Sir William Brass, MP. Member of Parliament for the Clitheroe division of Lancashire since 1922. For political and public services.
- Field-Marshal Sir Philip Walhouse Chetwode, Bt., GCB, OM, GCSI, KCMG, DSO. Chairman of the Executive Committee of the War Organisation of the British Red Cross Society and Order of St. John of Jerusalem.
- Major Sir William Cope, Bt., KC, TD. Member of Parliament for Llandaff & Barry, 1918–1929. For political and public services in Wales.
- Major Sir (Albert) James Edmondson, DL, MP. Vice-Chamberlain of H.M. Household, 1939–1942, and Treasurer since 1942. Member of Parliament for Banbury since 1922.
- Sir Eugene Ramsden, Bt., OBE, MP. Member of Parliament for Bradford North, 1924–1929, and since 1931. For political and public services.

=== Privy Councillor ===
- Ben Chifley, Treasurer of Australia and Minister for Post-War Reconstruction, Commonwealth of Australia.

=== Baronet ===
- The Honourable Richard Douglas Denman, MP. Second Church Estates Commissioner, 1931–1943. Member of Parliament for Carlisle, 1910–1918, and for Leeds, Central division, since 1929. For political and public services.
- Air Chief Marshal Sir Wilfrid Rhodes Freeman, GCB, DSO, MC. Lately Chief Executive, Ministry of Aircraft Production.
- Sir (Alfred) James Hawkey, JP. Chairman of the West Essex Unionist Association. Mayor of the Borough of Wanstead & Woodford. For political and public services.
- The Right Honourable Henry George Hill Mulholland, Speaker of the House of Commons of Northern Ireland, 1929–1945. Member of Parliament, for County Down in the Parliament of Northern Ireland, 1921–1929, and for Ards since 1929.

=== Knight Bachelor ===
- Frederick John Alban, CBE, FSAA, JP, Secretary and Comptroller, King Edward VII Welsh National Memorial Association.
- Wilfrid Ayre, Chairman and Managing Director, Burntisland Shipbuilding Company Ltd.
- Squadron Commander James Bird, OBE, FRAeS, MInstNA, RNAS (Retd.), General Manager, Vickers-Armstrongs Ltd. (Supermarine Works).
- Captain James Gordon Partridge Bisset, CBE, RD, RNR (Retd.), Commodore Master of Cunard White Star Fleet.
- Lewis Thomas Casson, MC, lately Drama Director for the Council for the Encouragement of Music and the Arts.
- Councillor William Hugh Stobart Chance, Chairman, Smethwick Education Committee.
- William Bertram Chrimes, CBE, JP. Director of Wartime Meals, Ministry of Food.
- James Douglas Cooke, FRCS, MP. Member of Parliament for South Hammersmith since 1931. For political and public services.
- Harold Stanford Cooper, FCA, Joint Managing Director, Ford Motor Co.
- James Temple Cotton, CB, CBE, lately Under-Secretary, Ministry of Aircraft Production.
- Herbert Henry Edmund Craster, DLitt, FSA, Bodley's Librarian.
- Roydon Englefield Ashford Dash, DFC, FSI, FAI, Chief Valuer, Board of Inland Revenue.
- Thomas Arthur Eades, FCIS, FRSA, Managing Director, Automatic Telephone & Electric Co. Ltd.
- John Charles Fenton, KC, Sheriff principal of the Lothians and Peebles.
- Claude Dixon Gibb, CBE, Director General of Armoured Fighting Vehicles Production and Chairman of the Tank Board, Ministry of Supply.
- John Watson Gibson, OBE, Director, Pauling & Co. Ltd.
- Noel Barré Goldie, KC, MP, Member of Parliament for Warrington since 1931. For political and public services.
- Arthur Charles Hearn, Oil Adviser to the Fourth Sea Lord.
- Henry Thomas Holloway, Chairman of the Uniformity Joint Board in the Building and Civil Engineering Industries.
- Charles Edward Inglis, OBE, LLD, MInstCE, MInstME, FRS, lately Professor of Mechanical Sciences, University of Cambridge.
- John Johnston, DL, Member of Parliament for North Armagh in the Parliament of Northern Ireland since 1929. For political and public services.
- Reginald Watson Watson-Jones, MCh, MB, FRCS, LRCP, Civilian Consultant to the Royal Air Force.
- Gerald Festus Kelly, RA, Painter.
- Robert Letch, Regional Port Director, North Western Area, Ministry of War Transport.
- Hugh Mackenzie, CBE, Provost of Inverness.
- Arthur Croke Morgan, President of the Council of The Law Society.
- Albert Ralph Reed, Paper Controller, Ministry of Supply.
- Charles Carlow Reid, Production Director, Ministry of Fuel and Power.
- Gwilym Rowlands, CBE, JP, MP, Member of Parliament for Flint since 1935. For political and public services.
- Clarence Thomas Albert Sadd, CBE, JP, DL. Vice-Chairman and Chief of the Executive, Midland Bank Ltd.
- Edward William Salt, MP. Member of Parliament for the Yardley division of Birmingham since 1931. For political and public services.
- Andrew Denys Stocks, CB, OBE, Legal Adviser and Solicitor, Ministry of Agriculture & Fisheries.
- Charles Bruce Locker Tennyson, CMG. Chairman of the Board of Governors, National Register of Industrial Art Designers.
- Professor Frank Tillyard, CBE, lately Chairman of Trade Boards, Ministry of Labour and National Service.
- Lieutenant-Colonel Myers Wayman, OBE, JP, Chairman of the Emergency Committee, Sunderland.

Dominions

- The Honourable Clifden Henry Andrew Eager, KC, President of the Legislative Council, and Member of the War Advisory Committee in the State of Victoria.
- Brigadier the Honourable George Hodges Knox, CMG, VD, Speaker of the Legislative Assembly, State of Victoria.
- Brigadier-General Raymond Lionel Leane, CB, CMG, DSO, MC, VD, Commissioner of Police in the State of South Australia, 1920–1944. For public services.
- Sidney Valentine Sewell, MD, ChB, FRCP, a prominent consulting physician in the State of Victoria.

India

- The Honourable Mr. Justice Henry Benedict Linthwaite Braund, Barrister-at-Law, Puisne Judge of the High Court of Judicature at Allahabad, United Provinces, and lately Chairman of the Bengal Food Grains Policy Committee.
- The Honourable Mr. Justice Alan Gerald Russell Henderson, Indian Civil Service, Puisne Judge of the High Court of Judicature at Fort William in Bengal.
- Frederick Wynne Robertson, CSI, CIE, Indian Civil Service (retired), Chairman of the Federal Public Service Commission.
- Chandulal Madhavlal Trivedi, CSI, CIE, OBE, Indian Civil Service, Secretary to the Government of India in the War Department.
- John Bartley, CSI, CIE, Indian Civil Service, Additional Secretary and Draftsman to the Government of India in the Legislative Department.
- The Honourable Mr. Kenneth William Mealing, Member of the Council of State, Chairman of Directors, Messrs. Andrew Yule and Company Ltd., Bengal.
- Noshirwan Phirozshah Engineer, Advocate-General of India and lately Advocate-General of Bombay.
- The Honourable Khan Bahadur Qazi Mir Ahmed, Judge of the Judicial Commissioner's Court, North-West Frontier Province.
- James Glasgow Acheson, CIE, Indian Political Service, Resident in Kashmir.
- Richard Marsh Crofton, CIE, Indian Civil Service, Prime Minister, Bahawalpur State.
- Commodore (2nd Class) Henry Aloysious Bruno Digby-Beste, CIE, OBE, RN, lately Deputy Principal Sea Transport Officer (India).
- William John Jenkins, CIE, Indian Agricultural Service, Director of Agriculture, Bombay.
- Sri Diwan Bahadur Gopathy Narayanaswami Chetty, CIE, Merchant and Landlord and ex-Sheriff of Madras.
- Nawab Muzaffar Ali Khan Qizilbash, Member, Punjab Legislative Assembly, Landlord, Lahore, Punjab.
- Robert George Allan, CIE, Commissioner of Agriculture, Baroda State.
- Har Govind Misra, OBE, Mill-owner, Cawnpore, United Provinces.

Colonies, Protectorates, etc.

- David Callender Campbell, CMG, Colonial Administrative Service, Lieutenant-Governor, Malta.
- Charlton Adelbert Gustavus Lane, Colonial Legal Service, Chief Judge Mauritius.
- Clement Malone, OBE, Colonial Legal Service, Chief Justice of the Windward and Leeward Islands.
- John Edward Siegfried Merrick, CMG, OBE, Colonial Administrative Service, Chief Secretary, Uganda.
- Reginald Edwin Robins, CMG, OBE, General Manager, Kenya and Uganda Railways and Harbours.

=== Order of the Bath ===
==== Knight Grand Cross of the Order of the Bath (GCB) ====
Military Division
Royal Navy

- Admiral Sir Max Kennedy Horton, KCB, DSO.

Army

- Field-Marshal Sir Bernard Law Montgomery, KCB, DSO (8742), late Royal Warwickshire Regiment, Colonel Commandant, Parachute Regiment.

Royal Air Force

- Air Chief Marshal Sir Arthur Travers Harris, KCB, OBE, AFC.

==== Knight Commander of the Order of the Bath (KCB) ====
Military Division
Royal Navy

- Vice-Admiral Sir Robert Lindsay Burnett, KBE, CB, DSO.
- Vice-Admiral Geoffrey John Audley Miles, CB.
- Vice-Admiral Denis William Boyd, CB, CBE, DSC.
- Vice-Admiral Rhoderick Robert McGrigor, CB, DSO.

Army

- Lieutenant-General (temporary) Daril Gerrard Watson, CB, CBE, MC (9758), late The Duke of Cornwall's Light Infantry.
- Lieutenant-General Sir Henry Colville Barclay Wemyss, KBE, CB, DSO, MC (14202), Colonel Commandant, Royal Corps of Signals.
- Lieutenant-General Ralph Bouverie Deedes, CB, OBE, MC, Indian Army.

Royal Air Force

- Acting Air Marshal Charles Edward Hastings Medhurst, CB, OBE, MC.
- Air Vice-Marshal George Ranald Macfarlane Reid, CB, DSO, MC.

Civil Division

- Colonel the Right Honourable Edmund Colquhoun, Earl of Limerick, DSO, TD, Chairman, Territorial Army and Air Force Association for the County of the City of London.
- Sir Eric Bourne Bentinck Speed, KBE, MC, Joint Permanent Under-Secretary of State for War.
- Sir Frank Newton Tribe, KBE, CB, Permanent Secretary, Ministry of Aircraft Production, lately Secretary, Ministry of Fuel and Power.
- John Harold Edmund Woods, CB, MVO, Permanent Secretary, Ministry of Production.

==== Companion of the Order of the Bath (CB) ====
Military Division
Royal Navy

- Rear-Admiral Llewellyn Vaughan Morgan, CBE, MVO, DSC.
- Rear-Admiral Claud Barrington Barry, DSO.
- Rear-Admiral (Acting Vice-Admiral) Charles Saumarez Daniel, CBE, DSO.
- Rear-Admiral John Maurice Mansfield, DSO, DSC.
- Rear-Admiral Ernest Russell Archer, CBE.
- Rear-Admiral Harold Richard George Kinahan, CBE.
- Rear-Admiral Philip Esmonde Phillips, DSO.
- Rear-Admiral (E) John Benson Sidgwick.
- Engineer Rear-Admiral Dennis John Hoare.
- Acting Rear-Admiral (S) Edwin Howard Drayson, CBE.
- Rear-Admiral Arthur Rullion Rattray, CIE, Royal Indian Navy.

Army

- Major-General (temporary) Richard Augustin Marriott Bassett, CBE, MC (22092), late The Queen's Royal Regiment (West Surrey), Aide-de-Camp to The King.
- Major-General (temporary) Colin Bishop Callander, MC (10503), late The Leicestershire Regiment.
- Major-General (temporary) Lionel Howard Cox, CBE, MC (5085), late The Gloucestershire Regiment.
- Major-General (temporary) Brian Cuff, CBE (4529), late The Cheshire Regiment.
- Major-General (temporary) Philip George Saxon Gregson-Ellis, OBE (15399), late Grenadier Guards.
- Major-General (temporary) Arthur Leslie Irvine Friend, CBE, MC (20520), late 11th Hussars, Royal Armoured Corps, Colonel Commandant, Pioneer Corps.
- Major-General (temporary) John Malcolm Laurence Grover, MC (10337), late The King's Shropshire Light Infantry.
- Major-General (temporary) James Francis Hare, DSO (9570), late The King's Royal Rifle Corps.
- Major-General (temporary) Henry Porter Wolseley Hutson, DSO, OBE, MC (8350), late Royal Engineers.
- Major-General (temporary) William Henry Buchanan Mirrlees, DSO, MC (8039), late Royal Artillery.
- Major-General Leopold Thomas Poole, DSO, MC, MB, KHP (4845), Royal Army Medical Corps.
- Brigadier (temporary) Walter Clavel Herbert Prichard, CBE, DSO (3700), late Royal Engineers.
- Major-General (temporary) John Alexander Sinclair, OBE (6886), late Royal Artillery.
- Colonel George James Paul St Clair, CBE, DSO (1050), late Royal Artillery.
- Major-General (temporary) Norman Vyvyan Watson, OBE (13478), late Royal Artillery.
- Major-General Frederick George Wrisberg, CBE (10125), late Royal Artillery.
- Major-General (temporary) Alan Bruce Blaxland, OBE, Indian Army.
- Colonel Alexander Donald Powys Campbell, Indian Army.
- Major-General (temporary) Reginald Blaxland Clarabut, Indian Army.
- Major-General Eric Clive Pegus Plant, DSO, OBE, Australian Military Forces.
- Brigadier (temporary) Albert Edward Conway, OBE, New Zealand Military Forces.

Royal Air Force

- Air Vice-Marshal Kenneth Malise St. Claire Graeme Leask, MC.
- Air Vice-Marshal George Holroyd Mills, DFC.
- Air Vice-Marshal Henry Karslake Thorold, CBE, DSC, DFC, AFC.
- Acting Air Vice-Marshal John Astley Gray, CBE, DFC, GM.
- Air Commodore Cecil Arthur Bouchier, CBE, DFC.
- Air Commodore Colin Peter Brown, CBE, DFC.
- Air Commodore Henry Lumsden Crichton, MBE.
- Air Commodore Lawrence Darvall, MC.
- Air Commodore Walter Lloyd Dawson, CBE.
- Air Commodore Henry Edward Forrow, OBE.
- Air Commodore Francis Joseph Fressanges.
- Air Commodore Herbert Bainbrigge Russell, DFC, AFC.
- Brigadier James Thorn Durrant, DFC, South African Air Force.
- Acting Air Commodore Geoffrey William Tuttle, OBE, DFC.

Civil Division

- Lieutenant-Colonel (Brevet Colonel) Rupert George Dawson, TD, Chairman, Territorial Army Association for the County of Perth.
- Colonel Alan William Turnbull, MC, Vice-Chairman, Territorial Army Association for the County of Salop.
- Isaac Frederick Armer, MC, Principal Assistant Secretary, Ministry of Health.
- William Bertram Foden, Assistant Under-Secretary of State, Air Ministry.
- John Mackenzie Glen, Principal Assistant Secretary, Ministry of Labour and National Service.
- Geoffrey Dugdale Kirwan, Assistant Under-Secretary of State, Home Office, lately Principal Assistant Secretary, Ministry of Home Security.
- Frank Warburton Lawton, OBE, Principal Assistant Treasury Solicitor.
- Harvey Hugh Montgomerie, OBE, Principal Assistant Secretary, Ministry of Works.
- Edward Herbert Ritson, Commissioner of Inland Revenue.
- John Rowlatt, MC, Parliamentary Counsel.
- Joseph Scholes, OBE, Director of Personnel, General Post Office.
- Griffith Goodland Williams, Principal Assistant Secretary, Ministry of Education.

=== Order of the Star of India ===
==== Knight Commander of the Order of the Star of India (KCSI) ====
- The Honourable Sir Edward Charles Benthall, Member of the Governor-General's Executive Council.
- The Honourable Khan Bahadur Sir Muhammad Usman Sahib Bahadur, KCIE, Member of the Governor-General's Executive Council.

==== Companion of the Order of the Star of India (CSI) ====
- Anthony Lockhart Binney, CIE, Indian Civil Service, Adviser to His Excellency the Governor of the Central Provinces & Berar.
- Arthur Vivian Askwith, CIE, Indian Civil Service, Chief Commissioner, Delhi.
- John Dawson Tyson, CBE, Indian Civil Service, Secretary to the Government of India in the Department of Education, Health & Lands.
- Colonel Henry Wynter Wagstaff, MC, Member, Establishment, Railway Board, New Delhi.
- Marmaduke Robert Coburn, CIE, OBE, Additional Financial Adviser, Military Finance.
- Duncan MacLachlan, CIE, Indian Civil Service, Commissioner, Central Division, Poona, Bombay.
- John Wardle Houlton, CIE, Indian Civil Service, Chief Secretary to the Government of Bihar.
- John Whitcombe Hearn, CIE, Indian Civil Service, Additional Financial Commissioner, Revenue, and Secretary to Government, Transport Department, Punjab.

=== Order of Saint Michael and Saint George ===
==== Knight Grand Cross of the Order of St Michael and St George (GCMG) ====
- Sir Frank Arthur Stockdale, KCMG, CBE, Development Adviser to the Secretary of State for the Colonies, late Comptroller, Development and Welfare, West Indies.

==== Knight Commander of the Order of St Michael and St George (KCMG) ====
- Ernest Henry Murrant, MBE, lately Ministry of War Transport Representative in the Middle East.
- Harold Handasyde Duncan, Legal Adviser, Colonial Office & Dominions Office.
- Alexander William George Herder Grantham, CMG, Governor & Commander-in-Chief, Fiji, and High Commissioner for the Western Pacific.
- Godfrey Arthur Fisher, CMG, His Majesty's Consul-General at San Francisco.
- Richard Lysle Nosworthy, CMG, Minister (Commercial) in His Majesty's Foreign Service, Rome.

==== Companion of the Order of St Michael and St George (CMG) ====
- Frederic Evelyn Harmer, Temporary Assistant Secretary, His Majesty's Treasury.
- Francis William Musson, AFC, Controller of Programmes and Administration, British Air Commission, Washington.
- Benjamin Stanley Platt, MSc, PhD, MB, ChB, Director, Human Nutrition Research Unit, Medical Research Council.
- Guy Frederick Thorold, Temporary Assistant Secretary, Ministry of Economic Warfare.
- Group Captain John Franklyn Venner, AAF, Civil Assistant, Air Ministry.
- Henry William Allen Waring, Ministry of Supply Representative in Sweden.
- James Douglas Craig, CBE, Assistant Secretary, Office of the United Kingdom Representative to Eire.
- Leslie Claude Hunkin, Public Service Commissioner and Chairman of the Classification & Efficiency Board, State of South Australia.
- Sir Arthur Shuldham Redfern, KCVO, lately Secretary to the Governor General of Canada.
- Hugh Henry Dawes Simmonds, Chief Native Commissioner & Secretary for Native Affairs, Southern Rhodesia.
- Professor Albert Victor Bernard, CBE, MD, DPH, DTM&H, late Chief Government Medical Officer, Malta.
- Arthur Edward Hamp, CBE, General Manager, Tanganyika Railways & Ports Services.
- Harold Jowitt, Colonial Education Service, Director of Education, Uganda.
- Arthur Frank Kirby, AMInstT, General Manager, Palestine Railways.
- George Ernest Hugh Le Fanu, MD, ChM, late Consulting Physician at Liverpool to the Colonial Office.
- Colonel Patrick Alexander Bruce McKerron, Colonial Administrative Service, Deputy Head of Malayan Planning Unit.
- Lucius Nicholls, MD, Director, Bacteriological Institute, Ceylon.
- Alexander Montgomery Wilson Rae, MD, ChB, DTM&H, Assistant Medical Adviser to the Secretary of State for the Colonies, lately Deputy Director of Medical Service, Nigeria.
- Samuel Robinson, Assistant Secretary & Establishment Officer, Colonial Office and Dominions Office.
- Robert Scott, Colonial Administrative Service, Acting Chief Secretary, Palestine.
- Ernest Albert Vasey. For public services in Kenya.
- William Ernest Frank Ward, Colonial Education Service, Director of Education, Mauritius.
- Reginald James Bowker, His Majesty's Chargé d'affaires at Madrid.
- Harold Anthony Caccia, Minister (local rank) at His Majesty's Embassy at Athens.
- Brigadier Henry Antrobus Cartwright, MC, Military Attaché to His Majesty's Legation at Berne.
- Nigel de Grey, OBE, employed in a Department of the Foreign Office.
- Captain Henry Mangles Denham, RN, Naval Attaché to His Majesty's Legation at Stockholm.
- Maberly Esler Dening, OBE, Chief Political Adviser to the Supreme Allied Commander, South East Asia Command.
- Alexander Knox Helm, CBE, Counsellor at His Majesty's Embassy at Angora.
- Thomas Cecil Rapp, MC, His Majesty's Consul-General at Salonica.
- Michael Robert Wright, Counsellor at His Majesty's Embassy at Washington, D.C.

Honorary Companion

- Ademola II, CBE, Alake of Abeokuta, Nigeria.

=== Order of the Indian Empire ===
==== Knight Grand Commander of the Order of the Indian Empire (GCIE) ====
- Sir Abraham Jeremy Raisman, KCSI, CIE, Indian Civil Service, lately Member of the Governor-General's Executive Council.

==== Knight Commander of the Order of the Indian Empire (KCIE) ====
- His Highness Raja Anand Chand, Raja of Bilaspur.
- Conrad Laurence Corfield, CSI, CIE, MC, Indian Political Service, lately Resident for the Punjab States.
- Godfrey Ferdinando Stratford Collins, CSI, CIE, OBE, Indian Civil Service, Adviser to His Excellency the Governor of Bombay.
- Sonti Venkata Ramamurty, CIE, Indian Civil Service, Adviser to His Excellency the Governor of Madras.
- Sir Satyendra Nath Roy, CSI, CIE, Indian Civil Service, lately Secretary to the Government of India in the Department of War Transport.
- Maharajadhiraja Bahadur Uday Chand Mahtab, of Burdwan, Member of the Bengal Legislative Assembly, Zemindar, Bengal.

==== Companion of the Order of the Indian Empire (CIE) ====
- Mohamad Ali, OBE, Indian Audit & Accounts Service. Financial Adviser, War & Supply.
- Colonel (Temporary Major-General) Coles Alexander Osborne, Indian Army, Commander, Kohat District.
- William Alan Wright, AFC, Indian Civil Service, lately Officiating Joint Secretary, War Department, Government of India.
- The Honourable (Horace) Somerset Edmond Butler, Commerce Adviser, Department of Food, Government of India.
- Ronald Stuart Symons, Indian Civil Service, Joint Secretary to the Government of India in the Finance Department.
- Lieutenant-Colonel Cecil Walter Lewery Harvey, OBE, MC, Resident for Kolhapur and Deccan States.
- Brigadier Noel Robert Charles Cosby, MC, Indian Army, Inspector-General, Frontier Corps, North-West Frontier Province.
- Commodore Phillip Armitage Mare, Royal Indian Navy, Chief of Administration, Naval Headquarters, India.
- Dennis George Watson, Indian Police, Inspector-General of Police, Central Provinces and Berar.
- Lieutenant-Colonel (Temporary Brigadier) Ross Cosens Howman, OBE, The Assam Regiment, Director of Security (India Command), General Staff Branch, General Headquarters, India.
- Lieutenant-Colonel (Temporary Brigadier) Charles Henry Nicholas, 6th Rajputana Rifles, Commander, 152 L. of C. Sub-Area.
- Lieutenant-Colonel (Temporary Brigadier) Frederick Hubert Vinden, The Suffolk Regiment, Director, Selection of Personnel, Adjutant-General's Branch, General Headquarters, India.
- C. N. Chandra, Indian Civil Service, Secretary to Government, Finance Department, Punjab.
- Motiram Khushiram Kirpalani, Indian Civil Service, Secretary to the Government of Bengal, Commerce, Labour & Industries Department, Bengal.
- Satyendramohan Banerjee, Indian Civil Service, Secretary, Revenue, Forests & Excise Departments and Director of Civil Evacuation, Bengal.
- Frederick Euson Cormack, Indian Service of Engineers, Chief Engineer and Secretary to Government, Public Works Department, Assam.
- Thomas Arthur Wyness Foy, Indian Service of Engineers, Chief Engineer and Secretary to Government, Punjab, Public Works Department, Irrigation Branch.
- Madhusudan Damodar Bhat, Indian Civil Service, Milk Commissioner, Bombay.
- Captain (E.) Wilfred John Lifton, RIN, Chief Surveyor with the Government of India.
- Lieutenant-Colonel (Temporary Colonel) Evelyn Siegfried MacLeod Prinsep, OBE, Probyn's Horse, Assistant Quartermaster-General, Lucknow District.
- Alexander George Milne, Administrative Officer & Chief Engineer, Cochin.
- Harold Hinton Cooper, Chief Mechanical Engineer, North-Western Railway, Lahore.
- Lieutenant-Colonel (Temporary Colonel) (Local Brigadier) Herbert Dryden Home Yorke Nepean, DSO, Deputy Military Adviser-in-Chief, Indian States Forces, New Delhi.
- Prafulla Chandra Chaudhuri, Indian Audit & Accounts Service, Accountant-General, Bengal.
- Lieutenant-Colonel (Temporary Colonel) Frank William Edward Tydeman, Corps of Indian Engineers, Deputy Director of Transportation, Bombay Port War Reconstruction.
- Herbert Cecil Stork, Indian Civil Service, Legal Remembrancer, Assam.
- Walter Kirby, MIME, Chief Inspector of Mines in India, Department of Mines, Dhanbad.
- Robert Hume, OBE, Indian Police, Commissioner of Police, Madras.
- James Alexander Scott, OBE, Indian Police, Deputy Inspector-General of Police, Lahore Range, Punjab.
- Chandulal Chunilal Desai, Indian Civil Service, Controller-General of Civil Supplies.
- Satyendru Nath Ray, Indian Civil Service, Financial Adviser, Department of Civil Supplies, Bengal.
- Edward Birkbeck Wakefield, Indian Political Service, lately Chief Minister, Rewa State.
- Chintaman Govind Kale, Indian Service of Engineers, Superintending Engineer, Project Circle, Bombay.
- John Curtis Wernher Eustace, Indian Civil Service, Director, War Information and Deputy Secretary to Government, Punjab, Home Department (War Front), and Provincial Organizer, National War Front, Punjab.
- Khan Bahadur Abdul Ghafoor Khan, MSc (Tech. MA.Ch.), MIEE (Lond.), MIE (India), Deputy Controller-General of Inspection (Civil Wing).
- Bhadrasinhrao Anandrao Gaekwar, lately Dewan, Baroda State.
- James Clark Molesworth Gardner, ARCS, DIC, FRES, Dip. For (Cantab.), Indian Forest Service, Forest Entomologist, Forest Research Institute, Dehra Dun.
- Lieutenant-Colonel Kombar Ramaswami Krishnaswami Iyengar, OBE, Indian Medical Service (retired), Director, Pasteur Institute of Southern India, Coonoor, The Nilgiris, Madras.
- Frank Aubrey Pope, lately Regional Port Director, Calcutta.
- Rajkumar Ripjit Singh, Raja Kothi, Raja Nagar, Kheri District, United Provinces.
- Anthony William Robertson, OBE, DFC, Indian Police (retired), Dewan, Bundi State.

=== Royal Victorian Order ===
==== Knight Commander of the Royal Victorian Order (KCVO) ====
- Louis Forbes Fergusson, CVO.
- Sir Eric Robert Dalrymple Maclagan, CBE, FSA.
- Lieutenant-Colonel Terence Edmund Gascoigne Nugent, CVO, MC.

==== Commander of the Royal Victorian Order (CVO) ====
- Captain Sidney Charles Herbert, Lord Herbert.
- Charles Joseph Henry O'Hara Moore, MC.
- Lieutenant-Colonel Frederick Edward Packe, MVO, OBE.
- Charles Cornwallis Anderson Pelham-Welby (dated 26 April 1945).

==== Member of the Royal Victorian Order, 4th class (MVO) ====
- Vera Grenfell.
- Mary Lilias Mackenzie.
- Lieutenant-Colonel Arthur Miles Weeer-Brown.
- Captain Peter Booth Clarke, OBE, DSC, Master, Merchant Navy (dated 17 April 1945)
- Lieutenant-Colonel Louis William la Trobe Cockcraft, DSO.

==== Member of the Royal Victorian Order, 5th class (MVO) ====
- Beatrice Sarah Louisa Witt.
- Albert James Galpin.
- James René Alexis Kennedy.
- Vincent Joseph Law (dated 21 February 1945).
- Edmond Eustace Lloyd.
- William McIntosh.

=== Order of the British Empire ===
==== Knight Grand Cross of the Order of the British Empire (GBE) ====
Civil Division

- Sir Ernest Arthur Gowers, KCB, KBE, lately Senior Regional Commissioner for Civil Defence, London Region.
- His Highness Maharaja Dhiraj Mirza Maharao Shri Vijayaraji, Savai Bahadur, Maharao of Cutch.

==== Dame Commander of the Order of the British Empire (DBE) ====
Civil Division

- Joan, the Honourable Mrs. Sydney Marsham, CBE, Chairman of the National Women's Auxiliary, Young Men's Christian Association. For public services.
- Katherine Christie Watt, CBE, RRC, Chief Nursing Officer, Ministry of Health.

==== Knight Commander of the Order of the British Empire (KBE) ====
Military Division
Royal Navy

- Vice-Admiral Charles Edward Barrington Simeon, CB.
- Major-General Robert Grice Sturges, CB, DSO, Royal Marines.
- Instructor Rear-Admiral Arthur Edward Hall, CB, CBE.

Army

- Lieutenant-General (acting) Charles John Stuart King, CB, CBE, MInstCE (5219), late Royal Engineers.
- Major-General John Noble Kennedy, CB, MC (13614), late Royal Artillery.

Royal Air Force

- Air Vice Marshal Geoffrey Rhodes Bromet, CB, CBE, DSO.
- Air Vice-Marshal Lionel Douglas Dalzell McKean, CB, OBE.
- Air Vice-Marshal Hugh William Lumsden Saunders, CB, CBE, MC, DFC, MM.

Civil Division

- The Right Honourable Wykeham Stanley, Baron Cornwallis, MC, His Majesty's Lieutenant of the County of Kent and Chairman of the Kent War Agricultural Executive Committee.
- Sir Edward Highton Hodgson, CB, OBE, Second Secretary, Board of Trade.
- Otto Mundy, CB, Deputy Chairman, Board of Customs and Excise.
- Henry Wilson Smith, Under-Secretary, H.M. Treasury.
- Lieutenant-Colonel Sir Charles George Wickham, DSO, Inspector-General, Royal Ulster Constabulary.
- The Honourable Sir Herbert Angas Parsons, Senior Puisne Judge, Supreme Court, and Vice-Chancellor of the University of Adelaide, in the State of South Australia.
- Colonel Sir Jamshedji Nasarvanji Duggan, CIE, OBE, DO, JP, Chairman, Bombay Provincial Joint War Committee of the Indian Red Cross Society and St. John Ambulance Association, Bombay.

Honorary Knight Commander

- Adeyemo Alakija, CBE. For public services in Nigeria.

==== Commander of the Order of the British Empire (CBE) ====
Military Division
Royal Navy

- Acting Captain The Right Honourable John Hugo, Baron Ampthill (Retd.) (Bedford).
- Captain Gerald Courtney Banister, OBE (Retd.).
- Captain Claude Lindsay Bate, DSO (Retd.).
- Acting Captain (S) Glendenning Blamey (Petersfield).
- Agnes Jean Currie, Superintendent, WRNS.
- Acting Captain Richard Charlie Donovan (Retd.).
- Acting Surgeon Captain William Innes Gerrard, OBE, MD, FRCP, DPH (Retd.).
- Acting Captain Harold Sinclair Hopkins.
- Captain Hugh Meynell Cyril Ionides.
- Lieutenant-Colonel (Acting Major-General) Charles Robert Wharram Lamplough, DSC, Royal Marines.
- Captain (E) The Honourable Denis Crichton Maxwell (London).
- Captain Reginald Francis Morice (Retd.).
- Engineer Rear-Admiral Harold Hepworth Perring, CB (Retd.).
- Acting Captain (S) William Brian Canning Simpson, OBE.
- Colonel Second Commandant (Acting Colonel Commandant) (Temporary Brigadier) Arthur Nicholls Williams, OBE, Royal Marines.
- Acting Captain Robert Bradshaw Wilmot-Sitwell (Retd.) (Winchester).
- Commodore Charles Trevenen Wilson.
- Commodore 2nd Class Henry Arthur Showers, Royal Australian Navy.

Army

- Brigadier (temporary) Harold Henry Bateman, DSO, OBE, MC (4226), Reserve of Officers, Royal Engineers.
- Lieutenant-Colonel (temporary) Arthur Brian Boyle (53519), Reserve of Officers, Royal Corps of Signals, Territorial Army.
- Colonel George Frederick Charles (15721), late Army Dental Corps.
- Brigadier (temporary) Sydney Collingwood, MC (5411), late Royal Artillery.
- Brigadier (temporary) Norman Richard Crockatt, DSO, MC (8225), retired pay, late The Royal Scots (The Royal Regiment).
- Brigadier Eric Rouviere Day, Southern Rhodesia Military Forces.
- Colonel (acting) William Duff Gibbon, DSO, MC (119776), Army Cadet Force.
- Brigadier (temporary) Charles Granville Barry Greaves, OBE (6885), late Royal Engineers.
- Brigadier (temporary) James Wilfred Lang Stanley Hobart, DSO, MC (6927), late The North Staffordshire Regiment (The Prince of Wales's).
- Chaplain to the Forces 1st Class The Reverend Levi Gethin Hughes, MBE, KHC (22776), Royal Army Chaplains' Department.
- Brigadier (temporary) Charles Ardagh Langley, MC (13390), Royal Engineers.
- Brigadier (temporary) Roderick William McLeod (31581), Royal Artillery.
- Brigadier (temporary) Forbes Lankester McNaughton, DSO (4914), late Royal Artillery.
- Brigadier (temporary) George Murray, DSO, MC (8766), late The Seaforth Highlanders (Ross-shire Buffs, The Duke of Albany's).
- Brigadier (temporary) Cynric Puleston Prescot, MA, AMInstCE (20726), Royal Corps of Signals.
- Colonel (temporary) Cedric Rhys Price, OBE (33361), Royal Engineers.
- Colonel (temporary) George William Raby (106194), Royal Engineers
- Colonel (temporary) Arthur Eaton Richmond, OBE (9946), Royal Army Medical Corps.
- Brigadier (temporary) John Howard Stafford, OBE, MC (6675), late Royal Engineers.
- Brigadier (temporary) James Storar (152167), Royal Electrical and Mechanical Engineers.
- Brigadier (temporary) Thomas Harrison Wand-Tetley, OBE (13963), late The Wiltshire Regiment (Duke of Edinburgh's).
- Colonel (temporary) Samuel Torton Wills (909 IA), Indian Army Ordnance Corps.
- Brigadier (temporary) Cecil John Woolley, DSO, MC (23716), Royal Artillery.
- Colonel (temporary) Ronald Ernest Stephen Yeldham (24451), The Sherwood Foresters (Nottinghamshire & Derbyshire Regiment), Officer Commanding the Troops, Mauritius.
- Brigadier Alfred Richard Baxter-Cox, ED, Australian Military Forces.

Royal Air Force

- Air Vice-Marshal David Vaughan Carnegie, AFC.
- Air Vice-Marshal John Whitworth-Jones, CB.
- Acting Air Vice-Marshal Robert Stewart Blucke, DSO, AFC.
- Acting Air Vice-Marshal Noel Lloyd Desoer.
- Acting Air Vice-Marshal Thomas James Kelly, MC, MD, ChB.
- Acting Air Vice-Marshal D'Arcy Power, MC, MRCS, LRCP.
- Acting Air Vice-Marshal John René Whitley, DSO, AFC.
- Air Commodore Gordon Arthur Ballantyne, DFC, LDS, RCS.
- Air Commodore Kenneth Dowsett Gould Collier.
- Air Commodore Harold Hunter Down, AFC.
- Air Commodore Ralph Edward McBurney, RCAF.
- Air Commodore Somerled Douglas Macdonald, DFC.
- Air Commodore Alfred Randles Wardle, AFC.
- Air Commodore Richard Whyte.
- Acting Air Commodore Paul Sandland Blockey.
- Acting Air Commodore Leslie William Cannon.
- Acting Air Commodore William Daniel Disbrey, OBE, AFC.
- Acting Air Commodore John Goodenough Elton, DFC, AFC.
- Acting Air Commodore Theodore Neuman McEvoy, OBE.
- Acting Air Commodore Hector Douglas McGregor, DSO.
- Acting Air Commodore Thomas Bain Prickman, OBE.
- Acting Air Commodore Barnabas Henry Cross Russell.
- Acting Air Commodore Roland George Seymour.
- Acting Air Commodore David John Waghorn, AFC, with effect from 31 March 1945 (since deceased).
- Acting Air Commodore Geoffrey Luis Worthington.
- Group Captain Francis Gerald Cator.
- Group Captain Ralph Cleland.
- Group Captain Henry James Gemmel.
- Group Captain Arthur Pethick Revington, OBE.
- Group Captain Cecil Stanley Riccard.
- Group Captain Ronald Scott Sugden, AFC.
- Group Captain Thomas Frederick Wailes Thompson, DFC.
- Group Captain Wilfred Wynter Morgan, MC.
- The Right Reverend Monsignor Henry Beauchamp, MC.
- Colonel Alan Jack Marlden Mossop, SAAF.
- Acting Group Captain David Samuel Jillings, MBE, MC, RAFVR.
- Acting Group Captain Edward Albert Warfield, DFC, RAFO.
- Acting Group Captain Lindsey Spence Weedon, RAFVR.
- Group Officer Isobel Mary Campbell, WAAF.
- Acting Air Commodore Ronald Burns Bannerman, DFC, RNZAF.

Civil Division

- George William Barr, Joint Managing Director, Fairfield Shipbuilding and Engineering Company Ltd.
- Thomas Benfold, JP, Chairman of the Durham County Council.
- Falconer Moffat Birks, OBE, Chief Engineer, Gas Light and Coke Company.
- James Cochran Blair. Lately Deputy Controller General of Machine Tools, Ministry of Supply.
- Reginald Samuel Brownell, Permanent Secretary, Ministry of Education, Northern Ireland.
- Anne Margaret Bryans, Commissioner, Joint War Organisation of the British Red Cross Society and Order of St. John, Middle East.
- Captain Joseph Kenneth Chaplin, Master, SS Strathmore, Peninsular and Oriental Steam Navigation Company Ltd.
- Stephen Oswald Chivers, Honorary Technical Adviser to the Ministry of Food on Fruit & Vegetable Products.
- William Percy Cowley, Second Deemster, Isle of Man.
- Gerald John Cole-Deacon, Secretary, Railway Executive Committee.
- James Boyd Douglas, Chairman, Kirkcudbright Agricultural Executive Committee.
- Robert George Erskine, Deputy Chairman, Navy, Army and Air Force Institutes.
- Geoffrey Upcott Farrant, Chairman, Air Raid Precautions Committee, Somerset.
- Brevet Colonel Hugh Douglas Peregrine Francis, MC, TD, lately Deputy Director-General, Postal & Telegraph Censorship.
- Colonel Louis Franck, Civil Assistant, War Office.
- Kate Fraser, MD, ChB, DPH, Commissioner, General Board of Control, Scotland.
- Hugh Todd-Naylor Gaitskell, Temporary Principal Assistant Secretary, Board of Trade.
- Joseph Bramwell Graham, Clerk and Air Raid Precautions Controller, Bedfordshire County Council.
- Bernard Hart, MD, FRCP, Consultant Adviser in Psychiatry to the Ministry of Health.
- Captain Alfred Cyril Gordon Hawker, Master, SS Otranto, Orient Steam Navigation Company Ltd.
- Gilbert Hicks, JP, Registrar of Shoreditch County Court.
- Cyril Noel Hooper, Clerk of the Fishmongers' Company.
- Clifford George Jarrett, lately Principal Private Secretary to the First Lord of the Admiralty.
- William Clarence Johnson, OBE, Chief Constable of Birmingham.
- Reginald Monk Jones, Assistant Secretary, Air Ministry.
- Brevet Colonel Thomas Otto Jones, MBE, TD, DL, Secretary, Territorial Army and Air Force Association in the County of Glamorgan.
- Brigadier-General Cecil Courtney Lucas, MC, Assistant Secretary, Ministry of Home Security.
- James Lythgoe, City Treasurer, Manchester.
- James Wallace McDavid, DSc, FRIC, MIChemE, Managing Delegate Director, Explosives Division, Imperial Chemical Industries (Explosives) Ltd.
- James Reid McGregor, MC, Private Secretary to the Secretary of State for War.
- Agnes Mure Mackenzie, DLitt, for services to the study of history in Scotland.
- Alexander McKinna, OBE, Member of the Council of Management, Scottish Special Housing Association, lately acting Chairman of the Association.
- Harry William Magrath, MC, Chief Auditor and Secretary, National Insurance Audit Department.
- Allen Gatenby Marsden, Director of Transport, Ministry of Food.
- Loris Emerson Mather, Regional Controller, Ministry of Production.
- Donald MacLeod Matheson, Secretary of the National Trust.
- Eric Mensforth, MIMechE, FRAeS, MIPE, Vice-Chairman, Westland Aircraft Ltd.
- John William Morris, KC, Deputy Chairman, Home Office Advisory Committee (Defence Regulation 18B).
- William Mure, Joint Non-Ferrous Metals Controller, Ministry of Supply.
- George William Odey, Chairman, Leather, Footwear & Allied Industries Export Corporation Ltd.
- Air Commodore Henry Percy Smyth-Osbourne, CMG, DL, Commandant, South West Command, Air Training Corps.
- Henry Mansell Piper, Secretary of the British Employers' Confederation.
- Frederick Felix Potter, Director of Education for the County of Cheshire.
- Arthur Reeder, OBE, Assistant Secretary, Ministry of Labour and National Service.
- James Russell, MB, ChB, FRCSE, FRFPS, Surgical Director, Emergency Medical Service, Scotland.
- Rowland Glave Saunders, MRCVS, JP. Chairman, War Emergency Committee, Exeter County Borough.
- George Flett Sinclair, lately Transport Director, Middle East, United Kingdom Commercial Corporation.
- Frank Osborne Stuart, Air Raid Precautions Controller, Moray and Nairn.
- Alderman Frank Thraves, JP, Chairman of the Emergency Committee, Sheffield.
- William Edwin Tidman, Chief Engineer Officer, MV Stirling Castle, Union Castle Mail Steamship Co. Ltd.
- Joseph Hicks Langford Trevorrow, Deputy Chairman, Chesterfield Tube Co. Ltd.
- Margaret Walker, OBE, Commandant, British Red Cross Society.
- Alderman Richard Liddle Walker, Chairman of the West Riding War Agricultural Executive Committee and of the River Ouse Catchment Board.
- Victor Michael Barrington-Ward, DSO, Assistant General Manager (Operating), London and North Eastern Railway Co.
- Alderman Thomas Waterhouse, JP, for public services in Flintshire.
- Trevor Creswell Lawrence Westbrook, Production Controller, de Havilland Aircraft Co. Ltd.
- William Will, Chairman, Newspaper & Periodical Emergency Council.
- William Thomas Williams, OBE, lately Engineer Surveyor in Chief and Inspector of Testing Establishments, Ministry of War Transport.
- John Wishart, FEIS, General Secretary, Educational Institute of Scotland.
- John Ernest Yates, DCM, Assistant Secretary, General Post Office.
- John Crandon Gridley, recently Economic Adviser to His Majesty's Embassy at Paris.
- Harold Allan Dilke Hoyland, MBE, His Majesty's Consul-General at Athens.
- Norah Eva Lang Hunter, OBE, British subject resident in the Argentine Republic.
- Charles Henry Saxby, OBE, British subject resident in Egypt.
- Lieutenant-Colonel Harry Cyril Smith, OBE, MC, Director-General of Iraqi State Railways.
- Cyril Robert Williams, General Manager of the Sudan Railways.
- Eric Aubrey Bowring, For public services in Newfoundland.
- Major Geoffrey Eastwood, Comptroller of the Governor-General's Household, Canada.
- The Honourable Marcus Saltau, a Member of the Legislative Council, State of Victoria. For public services.
- Eva Mary Tilley, JP, President of the Women's Justices Association and of the Association of Benevolent Societies, State of Victoria.
- Robert Standish-White, OBE, FRCSI. For valuable services as honorary consulting surgeon, Rhodesian Air Training Group.
- Charles William Ayers, CIE, Excess Profits Tax Adviser to the Government of India.
- Reginald George Gordon Baker, Chairman, Imperial Tobacco Company of India Ltd.
- Raja Bahadur Thakurai Girivar Prasad Singh, of Ranka, Zamindar, Palamauo District, Bihar.
- Arthur Frederick Richards, Manager for India, Burma & Ceylon, Eagle Star Insurance Co. Ltd., Bombay.
- William Scarth Carlisle Tully, MBE, Director-General of Textile Goods in the Department of Civil Supplies, Government of Bengal.
- Herbert Cecil Smith, Indian Forest Service, Chief Conservator of Forests, Burma.
- Frederick Charles Courtenay Benham, Economic Adviser to the Comptroller of Development & Welfare in the West Indies.
- Captain Frederick Burnett, MC, Commissioner of Lands, Jamaica.
- Colonel Herbert William Ralph Chandler, OBE, MC, Director of Supplies, Gold Coast.
- William Douglas MacGregor, Conservator of Forests, Sierra Leone.
- Colin Raeburn, OBE, Water Engineer, Cyprus.
- Robert Coleridge Scott. For public services in Ceylon.
- Henry James Tucker. For public services in Bermuda.
- Bernard Reader Wood, Colonial Forest Service, Conservator of Forests, British Guiana.

Honorary Commanders

- Daniel Adesanya, Gbelegbuwa II, Awujali of Ijebu Ode, Nigeria.
- Israel Rokach, Mayor of Tel Aviv, Palestine.

==== Officer of the Order of the British Empire (OBE) ====
Military Division
Royal Navy

- Temporary Acting Lieutenant-Commander (S) Eric Percy Alexander, RNVR (Southampton).
- Lieutenant-Commander Wilfrid Gordon Axworthy (Retd.).
- Marjorie Gillespy Bois, Chief Officer, WRNS.
- Acting Commander Thomas William Botley.
- Temporary Lieutenant-Colonel Edward Stuart Simken Bowman, Royal Marine Engineers.
- Temporary Acting Commander Douglas Vivian Laurence Cheeseman, RNR (Cardiff).
- Commander (S) Norman Thomas Porteous Cooper.
- Temporary Acting Commander George Dale Copeland, MBE, RNR (Blackwater, Surrey).
- Commander James Godfrey Wood Deneys, DSO (Retd.).
- Commander (S) Norman Edgar Denning.
- Acting Commander Frederick Charles Fellows-Gordon, DSC (Retd.).
- Surgeon Commander James Martin Flattery, RAN.
- Acting Temporary Commander (A) Richard Exton Gardner, DSC, RNVR (Warlingham, Surrey).
- Acting Lieutenant-Commander Dennis John Stoncy Westropp George, RANR.
- Commander Edgar William Grace (Retd.) (Edinburgh).
- Captain (Temporary Major) Leslie Alban Harris, DSC, Royal Marines.
- Acting Captain (E) Sydney Alick Harrison-Smith.
- Acting Commander Henry Treby Heale, RNR (Retd.) (London).
- Engineer Commander Henry Alan Higgs (Sunbury-on-Thames).
- Commander Alexander Scrope Hutchinson (Retd.).
- Lieutenant-Commander John Augustin Ievers (East Grinstead).
- Commander Charles Vincent Jack (Retd.).
- Commander (E) Walter Sydney Corfield Jenks.
- Temporary Acting Lieutenant-Commander (E) Edward Alfred Charles Kimpton, RNVR
- Commander David Charles Kinloch, DSO.
- Lieutenant-Commander Lancelot Charles Liddell.
- Commander Richard Herbert Mack (Retd.) (Rothesay).
- Commander Arthur Avalon Mackinnon (Retd.).
- Commander (S) Morrice Alexander McMullen (Alverstoke).
- Acting Temporary Lieutenant-Commander (A) Anthony Horace Milward, RNVR
- Temporary Acting Lieutenant-Commander (S) Edgar Philip Stuart Parr, RNVR (Cardiff).
- Acting Temporary Surgeon-Commander Clarence Lucan Gray Pratt, MB, ChB, MD, RNVR (Alverstoke).
- Captain (Retd.) (acting Lieutenant-Colonel) Kenneth Edward Previté, Royal Marines.
- Acting Lieutenant-Commander (A) Gilbert Hammer George Stratford Rayer, RNVR (Feltham).
- Major (Acting Lieutenant-Colonel) Cosmo La Roche Salter, Royal Marines.
- Acting Lieutenant-Commander (A) John MacDonald Scott.
- Lieutenant-Commander (A) Mayre Glen Sedorski.
- Lieutenant-Commander (S) Thomas Charles Sherwin.
- Acting Commander Eric Cardew Streatfield-James, Royal Indian Navy.
- Commander Roger Henry George Talbot (Retd.) (Dunfermline).
- Temporary Acting Commander Allan Patterson Wallace, RNR (Caithness).
- Commander (S) George Arthur Patrick Webster, DSC (Retd.) (Westminster, Orange Free State).
- Temporary Acting Lieutenant-Commander (E) Cyril Wilson, RNVR (Huddersfield).
- Commander Frederick Gordon Wynne.
- Acting Captain (S) John Edward Hehir, RAN.

Army

- Lieutenant-Colonel (temporary) Carl Douglas Aarvold (104391), Royal Artillery, Territorial Army.
- Lieutenant-Colonel (temporary) Edward James Board Akerman, MC (110346), The Somerset Light Infantry (Prince Albert's).
- Chief Commander Julian Philps Allan (192093), Auxiliary Territorial Service.
- Lieutenant-Colonel (temporary) William Arthur Roger Ames (15359), Reserve of Officers, The Oxfordshire and Buckinghamshire Light Infantry.
- Lieutenant-Colonel (temporary) John Geoffrey Atkinson (46509), The Buffs (Royal East Kent Regiment).
- Major (temporary) Dennis William Babbage (110915), Intelligence Corps.
- Brigadier (temporary) Thomas Leslie Barkas (9651), The East Yorkshire Regiment (The Duke of York's Own).
- Major (temporary) Guy Hiron Bartleet (31735), The Royal Warwickshire Regiment, Territorial Army.
- Colonel (temporary) Paul Ker Benner (18029), Royal Engineers.
- Colonel (acting) Samuel Leslie Bibby (272469), Army Cadet Force.
- Colonel (temporary) John Ray Brown (IA 101), Indian Armoured Corps.
- Lieutenant-Colonel (temporary) Patrick Reginald Evelyn Browne (93747), Royal Artillery, Territorial Army.
- Lieutenant-Colonel Lionel Beeley Burrows (IA 660), 2nd Punjab Regiment, Indian Army.
- Lieutenant-Colonel (temporary) Walter Morier Jubb Carruthers (126886), General List.
- Colonel (temporary) Herbert Carter (10445), The Sherwood Foresters (Nottinghamshire & Derbyshire Regiment).
- Colonel Norman George Roger Coats, Indian Army.
- Major Joseph Connel, ED (25793), Royal Corps of Signals, Officer Commanding, Barbados Home Guard.
- Lieutenant-Colonel (temporary) David Kingsley Daniels (342709), The King's African Rifles.
- Lieutenant-Colonel (temporary) Alexander Oakeley Dennistoun (48400), Reserve of Officers, The Black Watch (Royal Highland Regiment).
- Colonel (temporary) Cecil Aubrey Dixon (805), The Bedfordshire and Hertfordshire Regiment.
- Lieutenant-Colonel (temporary) Lionel Henry Godfrey Dorling, MC (4355), Reserve of Officers, Royal Artillery.
- Deputy Chief Commander Mary Evered Douglas (WAC 29), Women's Auxiliary Corps (India).
- Colonel the Right Honourable Richard, Viscount Downe (23806), Territorial Army.
- Colonel (temporary) Arthur James Dunkerley (27498), Royal Malta Artillery.
- Lieutenant-Colonel (temporary) Kenneth Morton Channer Evans (62122), Royal Corps of Signals.
- Lieutenant-Colonel (temporary) Robert Peter Fleming (47986), Reserve of Officers, Grenadier Guards.
- Colonel (temporary) John Alexander Fraser, DSO, DCM (9194), retired pay, late The Duke of Cornwall's Light Infantry.
- Lieutenant-Colonel (temporary) Arthur Cecil Frost, MBE (41418), Pioneer Corps.
- Brigadier (temporary) Norman George Gane, MC, 6th Rajput Rifles, Indian Army.
- Lieutenant-Colonel (temporary) The Honourable Alexander Campbell Geddes, MC (88344), Royal Artillery, Territorial Army.
- Colonel (temporary) Keith Hatch (I.A.305), Indian Armoured Corps.
- Lieutenant-Colonel (temporary) George Edward Hudson, MC, TD (70730), The Queen's Own Royal West Kent Regiment, Territorial Army.
- Lieutenant-Colonel (temporary) Edwin Patrick Cusack Hughes (E.C.9081), Indian Engineers.
- Lieutenant-Colonel Geoffrey Taylor Hurrell (22780), 17th/21st Lancers, Royal Armoured Corps.
- Lieutenant-Colonel (temporary) James Moffat Ireland, MBE (108076), Royal Army Ordnance Corps.
- Colonel (temporary) John Cooksey Jones (I.A.763), Royal Indian Army Service Corps.
- Lieutenant-Colonel Mervyn Joseph, ED, Chief Recruiting Officer, Ceylon.
- Lieutenant-Colonel (temporary) Royden Islay Hamilton Kinloch (3957), retired pay, late Royal Artillery.
- Lieutenant-Colonel (temporary) William Parsons Lappin, MB, ChB (M.Z.7978), Indian Army Medical Corps.
- Lieutenant-Colonel (temporary) Thomas Milner Lester (147708), Royal Army Ordnance Corps.
- Brigadier (temporary) Geoffrey Leonard Lillies, Indian Army.
- Lieutenant-Colonel (temporary) Richard Harry Barnes Longland (14468), Royal Engineers.
- Lieutenant-Colonel (temporary) Edmund Douglas Jefferiss Mathews (35983), Royal Engineers.
- Lieutenant-Colonel John McGregor, MC (26444), The Highland Light Infantry (City of Glasgow Regiment).
- Lieutenant-Colonel (temporary) Charles Vincent Merritt, East Africa Military Labour Service.
- Lieutenant-Colonel Richard Lionel Moore, MC (89961), The Queen's Royal Regiment (West Surrey), Territorial Army.
- Lieutenant-Colonel (temporary) James Clifford Morton (E.C.383), Indian Army Ordnance Corps.
- Colonel (temporary) David John Mull (23169), Army Dental Corps.
- Major Harold Ockenden, MC, Northern Rhodesia Regiment.
- Colonel (temporary) Reginald Shepperd Ollington (97501), Royal Tank Regiment, Royal Armoured Corps.
- Colonel (temporary) Alfred Stanley Osborne (99169), Royal Army Ordnance Corps.
- Colonel William Henry Ralston, DSO, MC, Southern Rhodesia Military Forces.
- Lieutenant-Colonel John Ernest Miller Richard (5782), Reserve of Officers, The Black Watch (Royal Highland Regiment).
- Lieutenant-Colonel (temporary) William Robin Palmer Ridgway (30376), Intelligence Corps.
- Colonel John Rowe, MC, MB (8101), late Royal Army Medical Corps.
- Lieutenant-Colonel Paul Herbert Walter Russell (11418), Royal Artillery.
- Lieutenant-Colonel (temporary) Alfred Emery Harry Sayers (9313), The Duke of Wellington's Regiment (West Riding)
- Lieutenant-Colonel Malcolm Stoddart-Scott, MC, TD (38295), Royal Army Medical Corps, Territorial Army.
- Colonel (acting) John Patrick Shelley (761), Grenadier Guards.
- Lieutenant-Colonel (temporary) Norman Lyon Shepperd, MB, FRCS (239062), Royal Army Medical Corps.
- Lieutenant Colonel (temporary) Thomas Irvine Smith (E.G.2962), 8th Ghurka Rifles, Indian Army.
- Colonel (temporary) Luther Gladstone Smith, MIMechE (31321), Royal Electrical and Mechanical Engineers.
- Colonel (temporary) Arthur Edward Stevens (15491), Royal Engineers (Indian Army).
- Lieutenant-Colonel (temporary) Ronald Cankrien Thompson (36277), Royal Army Pay Corps.
- Colonel (temporary) Alston Cranstoun Todd (757), Royal Artillery.
- Lieutenant-Colonel (temporary) Albert Edward Tyler (103384), Royal Corps of Signals.
- Lieutenant-Colonel (temporary) William Dickinson Walker (127592), The Durham Light Infantry.
- Lieutenant-Colonel (temporary) Francis Ward (59183), Scots Guards.
- Lieutenant-Colonel (temporary) Francis Seymour Williams, DSO (7658), Royal Engineers.
- Lieutenant-Colonel (temporary) Ronald Evelyn Leslie Wingate (146145), Intelligence Corps.
- Lieutenant-Colonel (temporary) Cecil Woodhouse Wood (35), The South Lancashire Regiment (The Prince of Wales's Volunteers).
- Lieutenant-Colonel Archibald Wotherspoon (31660), Royal Army Ordnance Corps.
- Lieutenant-Colonel (temporary) Robert Wrathall (101522), Royal Army Service Corps.
- Lieutenant-Colonel Mervin Alfred Rodger Synnot, Australian Military Forces.
- Lieutenant-Colonel Harry Wilson, VD, Australian Military Forces.
- Lieutenant-Colonel Henry Morton Foster, New Zealand Military Forces.
- Lieutenant-Colonel Frederick William Kemp, MC, ED, New Zealand Medical Corps, New Zealand Military Forces.

Royal Air Force

- Acting Air Commodore John George Bryans, RCAF.
- Acting Air Commodore Bernard Albert Chacksfield.
- Group Captain Desmond John Alvey.
- Group Captain Thomas Bruce Cooper, DFC.
- Group Captain Wilfred Reseigh Cox, MC, AFC.
- Group Captain Charles William Gore.
- Group Captain Charles Austin Horn.
- Group Captain Samuel Patrick Aylmer Patmore.
- Group Captain Reginald Horace Stanbridge.
- Group Captain Charles Herbert Algernon Stevens.
- Group Captain Ernest Hildebrand Stevens.
- Group Captain Collin Murray Stewart.
- Group Captain John Arthur Charles Stratton.
- Group Captain Peter William Mellor Wright.
- Acting Group Captain John Derek Bisdee, DFC, RAFVR.
- Acting Group Captain John Patrick Cave.
- Acting Group Captain Paul Yettvart Davoud, RCAF.
- Acting Group Captain William Eccles.
- Acting Group Captain Patrick Shaw Foss.
- Acting Group Captain Sir Archibald Philip Hope, Bt. DFC, AAF.
- Acting Group Captain Alan Stewart Jackson, AAF.
- Acting Group Captain Richard Gostwycke James, RAFO.
- Acting Group Captain John Enfield Kirk.
- Acting Group Captain Guy Kempton Lawrence, DSO, DFC, RAFO.
- Acting Group Captain George Lionel Spencer Lightfoot, RAFVR.
- Acting Group Captain Robert Heath Mason.
- Acting Group Captain Ernest Hutchison Glenn Moncrieff, RCAF.
- Acting Group Captain Thomas Frederick Dalton Morgan, DSO, DFC, RAFO.
- Acting Group Captain Thomas Charlie Penna.
- Acting Group Captain Walter John Pickard.
- Acting Group Captain Harold Percival Pleasance, DFC, RAFO.
- Acting Group Captain Reginald Charles Vaughan, MC, RAFVR.
- Acting Group Captain Sidney George Walker.
- Acting Group Captain Douglas Warner Williams.
- Acting Group Captain Edmund Noel Digby Worsley.
- Wing Commander Robert Alexander Barton, DFC (37664), RAFO.
- Wing Commander George Robert Brady (37932), RAFO.
- Wing Commander Robert St. Hill Clarke, AFC (03185).
- Wing Commander Archibald Ernest Clayson (35077).
- Wing Commander Jack Davison, Southern Rhodesian Air Force.
- Wing Commander William Henry Day (75178), RAFVR.
- Wing Commander Keeley Ian Goodman (75850).
- Wing Commander Donald Salisbury Green (19136), RAFO.
- Wing Commander Charles Douglas Griffiths, DFC (90234), AAF.
- Wing Commander Victor Henry Paul Lynham, DSO (34128), RAFO.
- Wing Commander George Mair Mackie (35118).
- Wing Commander Eric John Moule (08005), RAFVR.
- Wing Commander Subroto Mukerjee (Ind.1551), Royal Indian Air Force.
- Wing Commander William Farquhar Murray (24191).
- Wing Commander John Alexander Robinson (05250).
- Wing Commander Donald Garth Ross (32161).
- Wing Commander Rudolph Tibbey (35284).
- Wing Commander Brian Darville Stratford Tuke (03085), RAFVR.
- Wing Commander Conrad Edward Howe Verity (63137), RAFVR.
- Wing Commander John Brown Wallace (23269).
- Wing Commander Harold Robert Withers (21163).
- Lieutenant-Colonel Godfrey Newman McBlain, DFC (202984V), SAAF.
- Acting Wing Commander Clifford Aldridge (44282).
- Acting Wing Commander Donald Frederick Allen (21277).
- Acting Wing Commander Cyril Edgar Beer (44345).
- Acting Wing Commander Sydney James Berry (72123).
- Acting Wing Commander William Bradshaw, DFC (43413).
- Acting Wing Commander William Francis Bryanton (80057), RAFVR.
- Acting Wing Commander Russell Edwin Osboume Carey (115044), RAFVR.
- Acting Wing Commander Charles Albert Case (86265), RAFVR.
- Acting Wing Commander Mark Cohen (77138), RAFVR.
- Acting Wing Commander George Cruickshank, MBE (79096), RAFVR.
- Acting Wing Commander Dennis William Dobson (81793), RAFVR.
- Acting Wing Commander James Jervis Dutton (31268).
- Acting Wing Commander Thomas Arthur Francis Elsdon, DFC (33308).
- Acting Wing Commander Frederick Arthur Boucher Fawssett (70211).
- Acting Wing Commander Peter Carteret Fletcher, DFC, Southern Rhodesian Air Force.
- Acting Wing Commander William Cyril Joseph Foster (73189), RAFVR.
- Acting Wing Commander Walter Bennett Frampton (84143), RAFVR.
- Acting Wing Commander Peter Michael Arthur Green (81169), RAFVR.
- Acting Wing Commander Joseph Albert Hatton (84141), RAFVR.
- Acting Wing Commander William George Henry Hedges (90878), AAF.
- Acting Wing Commander Edward James Glynn Hill (43859).
- Acting Wing Commander Marcus Michael Kaye (70355), RAFO.
- Acting Wing Commander Ewart Newman Lohmeyer, DFC (78328), RAFVR.
- Acting Wing Commander Stewart Mackenzie (43397).
- Acting Wing Commander Joseph Rodney Moore (78080), RAFVR.
- Acting Wing Commander Jonn Richard Morgan (73539), RAFVR.
- Acting Wing Commander Ian McNaughton Parsons (77881), RAFVR.
- Acting Wing Commander Cyril Wolrick Passy, DFC (72028), RAFVR.
- Acting Wing Commander Kenneth Wright Pell (27140), RAFO.
- Acting Wing Commander Frederick James Powell, MC (74207), RAFVR.
- Acting Wing Commander Singleton Powell Richards, AFC (27112), RAFO.
- Acting Wing Commander Hugh Herbert Rose (77739), RAFVR.
- Acting Wing Commander Leslie George Scarman (82352), RAFVR.
- Acting Wing Commander Edward Arthur Alexander Shackleton (83143), RAFVR.
- Acting Wing Commander Harry Patrick Shallard (73393), RAFVR.
- Acting Wing Commander Hanbury Knolys Dawson-Shepherd (41353).
- Acting Wing Commander Percival Niger Shone (75751) RAFVR.
- Acting Wing Commander Dennis Gordon Singleton (29180), RAFVR.
- Acting Wing Commander Maurice Joy Smith (87633), RAFVR.
- Acting Wing Commander Ronald Noel Smith (37025), RAFO.
- Acting Wing Commander William Denis Ashley Smith (75706), RAFVR.
- Acting Wing Commander Maurice John Thomas (140205), RAFVR.
- Acting Wing Commander Charles Geoffrey Tipper (85523), RAFVR.
- Acting Wing Commander Arthur Frederick Trinder (72959), RAFVR.
- Acting Wing Commander Ronald Christopher Udall (79254), RAFVR.
- Acting Wing Commander Thomas Muir Warden (76426), RAFVR.
- Acting Wing Commander David Temple Way, MBE (44573), RAFVR.
- Acting Wing Commander Richard Williams (31300).
- Acting Wing Commander Philip Harold Seymour Wood (35298), RAFVR.
- Squadron Leader John Ernest Ann (43663).
- Squadron Leader William Cunniffe (44341).
- Squadron Leader William Dixon (86929), RAFVR.
- Squadron Leader William Harold Herbert (104785), RAFVR.
- Squadron Leader Ronald Henry Johnson (72221), RAFVR.
- Squadron Leader Herbert Thomas Legg (47237).
- Squadron Leader Percy John Macduff (89247), RAFVR.
- Squadron Leader James Taylor Main (44297).
- Major John Helperos Ritzema Eastwood (53337V), SAAF.
- Major William Frank Veitch (84026V), SAAF.
- Acting Squadron Leader John Bedwell Batchelor (85444), RAFVR.
- Acting Squadron Leader Edward Warwick Bloxham (105663), RAFVR.
- Acting Squadron Leader Stanley George Briden (43649).
- Acting Squadron Leader Richard Keniston Browning (77785), RAFVR.
- Acting Squadron Leader Robert Gibson Clarkson (108353), RAFVR.
- Acting Squadron Leader Quentin Curtis Craig (79262), RAFVR.
- Acting Squadron Leader John Baldwin Aston Fleming (43531).
- Acting Squadron Leader John Frederick Ginnett (82854), RAFVR.
- Acting Squadron Leader Thomas Day Griffin (84468), RAFVR.
- Acting Squadron Leader William Thomas Harrington (47005).
- Acting Squadron Leader Harold Edward Howard (45032).
- Acting Squadron Leader Hugh Owen Hughes (89042), RAFVR.
- Acting Squadron Leader Edward Mervyn John (68943), RAFVR.
- Acting Squadron Leader Fred Jullion (79448), RAFVR.
- Acting Squadron Leader Stanley Norman Kettle (123210), RAFVR.
- Acting Squadron Leader Arthur Harold Lodge (45385).
- Acting Squadron Leader Henry Herbert Loveday (87491), RAFVR.
- Acting Squadron Leader Alistair Henry Wilson MacBean (87246), RAFVR.
- Acting Squadron Leader David Napier Matthews (102257), RAFVR.
- Acting Squadron Leader Alexander Russell (84839), RAFVR.
- Acting Squadron Leader Robert John Sills (46666).
- Acting Squadron Leader William Sykes (49411).
- Acting Squadron Leader Percy Francis Trotter (81511), RAFVR.
- Acting Squadron Leader Robert Bruce Waller (61454), RAFVR.
- Acting Squadron Leader Charles William Fuglar Wavell (101136), RAFVR.
- Acting Squadron Leader Norman Wilson (45108).
- Group Officer Elspeth Barrie (198), WAAF.
- Squadron Officer Louise Hilliard Rankin (563), WAAF.
- Wing Commander Charles Osborne Fairbairn, AFC, RAAF.
- Wing Commander Archibald Brownlow MacArthur, RAAF.
- Wing Commander Miles Aylmer Barnett, RNZAF.

Civil Division

- Daniel Francis Horseman Brickell, MBE, His Majesty's Consul at Montevideo.
- Eric Arthur Cleugh, MVO, His Majesty's Consul-General at Havana.
- Charles Maxwell Davidson, British Consul at Medellín.
- William Charles Gentry, British subject resident in Spain.
- George Allan Hardy, British subject resident in Egypt.
- Horace Walter Rigden, British subject resident in Persia.
- Minnie Smaggasgale, British subject resident in Brazil.
- Benjamin Crewdson Thomas, British Information Services, New York.
- Cyril Edward Wiles, British subject resident in Iraq.
- Percy Evan Williams, MC, British subject resident in the Sudan.
- Major Jasper William George Wyld, District Commissioner, Sudan Political Service.
- William Clark, Mayor of the City of Launceston, State of Tasmania.
- Huntley James Clarke, a Civil Engineer and Surveyor of Queenstown, State of Tasmania. For municipal services.
- George Cobb, Superintendent, Western Division, Newfoundland Railway.
- Alan Biddulph Cowen, MIEE, Chairman and Chief Engineer, Electricity Supply Commission, Southern Rhodesia.
- Walter Edward Curtis, formerly Head of the Department of Supply, Newfoundland.
- John Duggan, JP, Councillor, Shire of Kara Kara, State of Victoria, for many years, and President on several occasions.
- Nutting Stuart Eraser, MD. CM, MRCS. Consultant, St. John's General Hospital, Newfoundland. For public services.
- Floris Visser Johnstone, Provincial Native Commissioner, Southern Rhodesia.
- The Reverend George Willis Kendrew, VD. For public services in the State of South Australia.
- John Andrew Michelsen, JP, Councillor, City of Bendigo, State of Victoria, for many years, and Mayor on three occasions.
- Captain John Mitchell Moubray, a Member of the Food Production Committee, Southern Rhodesia.
- Robert Thompson, Superintendent of Dockyard Operations, St. John's, Newfoundland.
- Louis David Waterhouse. For municipal and social welfare services in the State of South Australia.
- Joseph Booth, Indian Civil Service, Director of Civil Supplies (Districts), Bombay.
- David Barrington Brow, MC, Chief Engineer, Karachi Port Trust.
- Birendra Narayan Chakravarty, Indian Civil Service, Acting Secretary, Finance Department, Government of Bengal.
- Asoka Kumar Chanda, Indian Audit & Accounts Service, Joint Financial Adviser, Supply Finance, Government of India.
- Sadhu Ram Chaudhri, Indian Police, Superintendent of Police, Ferozepore, Punjab.
- Raja Chittar Singh Ju Deo, Rampura Estate, Jalaun District, United Provinces.
- Lieutenant-Colonel Amar Nath Chopra, Indian Medical Service, Inspector-General of Prisons and Director of Health, Orissa.
- Edward Archibald Hickling Churchill, Indian Agricultural Service, Principal, Agricultural College, Nagpur, Central Provinces and Berar.
- Reginald Alfred Collett, MBE, MInstCE, Public Health Engineer to the Government of Bombay.
- Major George Humphrey Cooke, Indian Political Service, Deputy Secretary, Political Department, India.
- Lieutenant-Colonel Reginald Fenwick Craster, IRRO, Commandant, Deoli Internment Camp.
- Panangattri Ananthanarayanaiyar Gopala-Krishnan, Indian Civil Service, Deputy Secretary to Government, United Provinces Supply Finance Branch.
- John Davies Gulick, Electrical Engineer, New Delhi Municipal Committee.
- Frederick John Abt Hart, Indian Forest Service, Conservator of Forests, in charge of the Utilisation and Research Circle, Darjeeling, Bengal.
- Eric Hodson, Indian Police, Controller, Chief Pioneer Force, Bengal.
- Rai Bahadur Jai Behari Lal, Deputy Director-General (War), Posts & Telegraphs Directorate, New Delhi.
- Lieutenant Colonel Philip Bowen Janson, 12th Frontier Force Regiment, Commandant, Tochi Scouts, North Waziristan, North-West Frontier Province.
- John Warren Tait Leith, MC, CA, Secretary, War Risks Insurance Advisory Committee, Bombay.
- Tinichendurai Muthukrishna Subra Mani, Indian Civil Service, Deputy Secretary to the Government of India in the Department of Planning & Development.
- Henry Idris Matthews, MC, Director of Ordnance Factories (General).
- Rabindra Kumar Mitra, Indian Civil Service, Controller of Printing & Stationery, India.
- Probhat Chandra Neogi, Indian Service of Engineers, Deputy Chief Engineer, Bengal, Communications & Buildings Branch.
- Roderick Wallis Parkes, Indian Political Service, Secretary to the Resident for the Punjab and lately Secretary to the Resident for Kolhapur and the Deccan States.
- Khan Bahadur Sheikh Habibur Rahman, Member, Legislative Assembly (Central), Delhi.
- John Stuart Reid, Indian Service of Engineers, Officiating Superintending Engineer, Southern Sind Circle, Sind.
- Vere Norman Rowsell, Traffic Superintendent, Bombay, Baroda and Central India Railway, Ajmer.
- David Clark Russell, ARCS, Director of Ordnance Laboratories, Cawnpore.
- Bhagwan Sahay, Indian Civil Service, Deputy Secretary to the Government of India in the Department of Education, Health & Lands.
- Lieutenant Colonel Moses Sendak, MD, BS, MRCS, DPH, Indian Medical Service, Superintendent, Special Prison, Ahmednagar Fort, Bombay.
- Edward Bonham Sim, Superintendent, Jorehaut Tea Co. Ltd., Assam.
- Balaram Sivaraman, Indian Civil Service, lately Magistrate and Collector of Purnea, Bihar.
- Reginald Sloan, Technical Engineering Representative of General Motors (India) Ltd., for liaison with the Military Authorities in India.
- John Lawrence Commerell Stubbs, Indian Civil Service, Collector and District Magistrate, Gorakhpur, United Provinces.
- Ramaswami Meenakshi Sundaram, Indian Civil Service, Additional Secretary to the Government of Madras, Development Department.
- James Stanley Tilley, Deputy Red Cross Commissioner, War Supplies Depot, Bombay.
- Joseph Aloysius Donatus Victoria, Landlord and Contractor, Manapad, Tinnevelly District, Madras.
- Niranjan Nath Wanchoo, Indian Civil Service, Deputy Secretary to the Government of India in the Department of Food.
- Francis Watson, Director, Counter Propaganda.
- Captain Archibald Wilfrid Tisdall Webb, Principal Refugee Officer, Commonwealth Relations Department, Government of India.
- Henry Wheatley, Director, Cinchona Department, Madras.
- Alfred Arthur Williams, Indian Civil Service, Deputy Commissioner, Lahore, Punjab.
- John Lamb Leyden, Burma Frontier Service, Deputy Secretary to the Government of Burma, Home Department.
- Rai Bahadur Prithvi Chand, Superintendent of Police, Straits Settlements, seconded to Special Branch in India.
- Rupert Thomas Chicken, District Commissioner, Copperbelt, Northern Rhodesia.
- James Crook, Deputy Head of Stores Department, Crown Agents for the Colonies.
- Hampden Archibald Cuke. For public services in Barbados.
- Judith De Cordova, MBE. For services in Jamaica during the War.
- James Robert McDowell Elliot, Colonial Administrative Service, Senior District Officer, Uganda.
- Laurence Wylie Fitzmaurice, MD, CM, Colonial Medical Service, Medical Officer and Bacteriologist, Bahamas.
- Garnet Hamilton Gordon. For public services in the Windward Islands.
- Gordon Hadow, Colonial Administrative Service, Assistant Colonial Secretary, Gold Coast.
- Brian Joseph Hartley, MBE, Colonial Agricultural Service, Agricultural Adviser, Aden.
- Henry Hastings, MB, BS, DTM&H. For medical and missionary services in Nigeria.
- William Donald Havelock, Port Manager, Sierra Leone.
- Robert Noel Henry, Colonial Administrative Service, Administrative Officer, Cyprus.
- William Herbert Jackson, Assistant Director, Public Works Department, Nigeria.
- Sydney Whitemore Dyer-Melville, Acting Director of Public Works, Zanzibar.
- Thomas Henry Parsons, FLS, Curator, Royal Botanical Gardens, Peradeniya, Ceylon.
- Andrew Hamilton Pike, Colonial Administrative Service, District Officer, Tanganyika Territory.
- Frederick John Pound, PhD, Colonial Agricultural Service, Senior Agricultural Officer, Trinidad.
- Royden Ernscliffe Taylor, MBE, Treasurer, St. Kitts-Nevis, Leeward Islands.
- Charles Douglas Todd, Colonial Administrative Service, Financial Secretary, Gibraltar.
- Herbert Watt Torrance, MC, MD. For medical services in Palestine.
- Tsibu Darku IX, Omanhene of Asin Atandasu. For public services in the Gold Coast.
- Frank Stanley Williams, Colonial Audit Service, Auditor, Nyasaland.

Honorary Officers

- Jibrail Katul, MBE, Assistant Director of Education, Palestine.
- Michael Moses, MBE. For public services in Uganda.
- Khalil Touqan. For services in connection with the War Economic Advisory Council, Palestine.

==== Additional Member of the Order of the British Empire (MBE) ====
Military Division
Royal Navy

- Acting Skipper Lieutenant Alexander Adamson, RNR.
- Acting Wardmaster Lieutenant-Commander Ernest Walter Biddlecombe (Retd.).
- Temporary Lieutenant-Commander John Grigor Brodie, RNVR.
- Telegraphist Lieutenant Frederick George Bunker.
- Elizabeth Mary Candy, Second Officer, WRNS.
- Acting Lieutenant-Commander Hajee Mohammed Siddiq Choudri, Royal Indian Navy.
- Mr. Sydney Cleburne, Temporary Warrant Telegraphist.
- Temporary Lieutenant Donald Cole, RNVR (Leicester).
- Nancie Margaret Conner, Second Officer, WRNS.
- Temporary Lieutenant (A) James Robson Cowan, RNZNVR.
- Temporary Lieutenant (E) Hilton Alfred Curnock, RNVR.
- Esta Eldod, First Officer, WRNS.
- Temporary Lieutenant Samuel James Norman Fenton, RNVR.
- Mr. John Frazer, Temporary Warrant Writer Officer.
- Mr. Arthur Crosby Gale, Temporary Warrant Writer Officer.
- Temporary Lieutenant Thomas Gardner, RNVR
- Mr. Douglas H. J. Hardy, Accredited Naval Correspondent, British Paramount News.
- Mr. Frank Thomas Hatfield, Boatswain (Birmingham).
- Temporary Lieutenant Douglas Valentine Hugonin, RNVR
- Mr. Charles Edward John Jenner, Warrant Shipwright (Wimborne).
- Mr. William Charles Judkins, Warrant Recruiter.
- The Reverend Robert Kirkland, Temporary Chaplain.
- Temporary Acting Lieutenant-Commander (A) James Caldwell Kole Kortright, RNVR.
- Acting Temporary Lieutenant-Commander Robert Arthur Lochner, RNVR.
- Mr. Oliver Henry Mantle, Warrant Telegraphist, Royal Indian Navy.
- Mr. Charles Frederick William McCoy, Temporary Warrant Stores Officer.
- Temporary Electrical Lieutenant William McKenzie, RNVR.
- Temporary Lieutenant William James Middlemiss, RNVR
- Acting Temporary Lieutenant Frederick Albert Parsons, RNVR
- Temporary Lieutenant (Acting Temporary Captain) Sidney Michael Peretz, Royal Marines (St. Peter Port, Guernsey).
- Mr. Percy William Price, Senior Chief Officer, Shore Wireless Service.
- Mr. Albert Edward Reddy, Warrant Ordnance Officer (Downderry, Cornwall).
- Temporary Lieutenant Joseph William Cyril Robinson, RNVR (Barry, Glam.).
- Mr. William George Scott, DCM, Warrant Recruiter, Royal Marines.
- Mr. William Scorey, Gunner (T).
- Temporary Lieutenant Stanley Gordon Sheppard, RNVR (London).
- Temporary Acting Lieutenant-Commander Philip Smiles, RNVR (Belfast).
- Acting Temporary Lieutenant-Commander James Frederick Somner, RNVR (Eton).
- Mr. Albert Edward Spence, Commissioned Telegraphist, Royal Indian Navy.
- Mr. John George Summers, Temporary Warrant Electrician (Herne Bay).
- Mr. Kenneth Haseltine Summers, Warrant Writer Officer.
- May Isobella Thomas, First Officer, WRNS.
- Temporary Lieutenant (Quartermaster) (Acting Temporary Captain) Leslie Thomas Ludlow Tunnicliff, Royal Marines (Worthing).
- Temporary Lieutenant Laurence Tuppen, RNVR (Shoreham).
- Temporary Lieutenant William Peters Vannet, RNVR (Arbroath).
- Lieutenant (E) Arthur Wallace Warner (Retd.).
- Lieutenant-Commander (E) Robert Kerr Weir (Retd.).
- Joan Mary Wiles, First Officer, WRNS.
- Temporary Acting Commander (E) Guy Ernest Williamson, RNVR.
- Lieutenant (A) Ronald Angus Wood, RNVR (Seven Kings).
- Lieutenant John Albert Harte, RAN.
- Temporary Lieutenant Frederick Johnston, RNZNVR.

Army

- Major (temporary) Frederick Leonard Allan, MC (25826), Pioneer Corps.
- Major (temporary) John Turner Allen (74717), Royal Army Service Corps.
- Major Edward Ison Andrews (23231), The Cheshire Regiment.
- Major (temporary) Arthur George Armstrong (63223), Royal Electrical and Mechanical Engineers.
- Major (temporary) the Right Honourable Thomas Percy Henry Touchet, Baron Audley (193752), The Worcestershire Regiment.
- Major Donald Creighton Balfour, Controller of Manpower, Gibraltar.
- Major (temporary) Charles Bernard Ball (114826), Royal Army Medical Corps.
- Major Edward Arthur Bamblett (A.I.768), 16th Punjab Regiment, Indian Army.
- Major (Commissary) James Barnett, Indian Engineers.
- Captain (temporary) Bashir Nawaz Khan (I.E.C.551), 13th Frontier Force Rifles, Indian Army.
- Lieutenant-Colonel (temporary) Leslie Hugh Bean (36290), The Gloucestershire Regiment.
- Captain (temporary) Christopher Archibald Beatty, Indian Army.
- Major (temporary) Philip Beverly (238), East Africa Intelligence Corps.
- No. 7611750 Warrant Officer Class I (temporary) Edward Eric Brindle, Royal Army Ordnance Corps.
- Major (temporary) Walter Hicham Brindle (92783), The Northamptonshire Regiment, Territorial Army.
- No. 1031198 Warrant Officer Class II Arthur Stoker Brown, Royal Corps of Signals.
- No. 227154 Staff Quartermaster Sergeant Alfred William Brown, Royal Army Service Corps.
- Captain (Quartermaster) John Money Brown (109335), General List.
- Major (temporary) Denys Burton Buckley (118789), Royal Army Ordnance Corps.
- Senior Commander (temporary) Helen Esme Burns (W.A.C.123), Women's Auxiliary Corps (India).
- Major William Henry Burn Callander (6466), The Royal Scots Greys, Royal Armoured Corps.
- Major (temporary) Duncan Campbell (143153), Royal Artillery.
- Major (temporary) George Clement Cave (180621), The Worcestershire Regiment, attached Royal Indian Army Service Corps.
- Major (temporary) Arthur Frederick Clark (E.C.5412), Intelligence Corps, Indian Army.
- No. 227608 Warrant Officer Class I Hugh Cecil Clayton, Royal Army Service Corps.
- Major (temporary) James Menzies Clow (24779), Royal Army Medical Corps.
- Major (temporary) James Coates (O.S.153), Indian Army Ordnance Corps.
- Major (temporary) Alan Cooper (E.C.2690), Indian Engineers.
- Major Frederick Walter Cooper (35274), Royal Army Pay Corps.
- Major Stephen Hilary Cox (10579), Reserve of Officers, Royal Army Service Corps, Officer Commanding, Royal Army Service Corps, Bermuda.
- Major (temporary) George Haskett Curry (99539), Royal Engineers.
- No. 14701 Warrant Officer Class I Elizabeth Dagnall, Auxiliary Territorial Service.
- Major (temporary) (local Lieutenant-Colonel) Cajeton Sales De Andrade (R.O.2810), Royal Indian Army Service Corps.
- Captain (Quartermaster) Edward Eliseo Demarco (157975), The King's Own Malta Regiment.
- Major Archibald Douglas, MC (20329), The Cameronians (Scottish Rifles).
- Captain (temporary) John Gilbert Dowling (204115), Royal Army Service Corps.
- Lieutenant-Colonel (temporary) George Brown Dryden (99608), Royal Army Service Corps.
- Major (temporary) Thomas Gerrard Du Buisson, MC (10466), Royal Artillery.
- No. 101309 Warrant Officer Class I Austin Christopher Duffield, Kenya Armoured Car Regiment.
- Captain (temporary) William Burns Duthie (176103), Army Air Corps.
- Major (temporary) William George Eaglen (75962), Royal Artillery.
- Major (temporary) Thomas Evers (235378), The Duke of Wellington's Regiment (West Riding)
- Major (temporary) Geoffrey Charles Fardell (178667), Royal Engineers.
- Lieutenant-Colonel (temporary) Edward Martin Friend (99067), The Durham Light Infantry.
- Major (temporary) Frederick Edgar Amato-Gauci (115559), Royal Malta Artillery.
- Major (temporary) Patrick Somerset Gibbs (49152), The Welsh Guards.
- Senior Commander Wendy Ellen Gibson (196228), Auxiliary Territorial Service.
- Lieutenant-Colonel (temporary) Thomas Travers Gilbert (244093), General List.
- Major (temporary) (local Lieutenant-Colonel) Hugh Golding (48449), The Royal Sussex Regiment.
- Major (temporary) Cecil Frederick Gravett (EC 8321), Indian Army.
- Major (temporary) Irvine Egerton Gray (101883), Intelligence Corps.
- Major (temporary) Horatio William Gregory, Indian Army.
- Lieutenant-Colonel (temporary) Peter Brian Alexander Grieve (176126), The King's Own Scottish Borderers.
- Major (temporary) Eli Evans Griffiths (138087), The Welch Regiment.
- Major (Quartermaster) John Groombridge (40996), The Royal Berkshire Regiment (Princess Charlotte of Wales's)
- Major (temporary) George Bernard Handley, TD (36969), The West Yorkshire Regiment, Territorial Army.
- Major (temporary) Phineas John Hands (130522), Royal Engineers.
- Major (temporary) Charles Robert Hardham (152395), Royal Engineers.
- No. 6844658 Warrant Officer Class I (acting) Edmond Albert Hanrahan, Indian Army Corps of Clerks.
- No. 9146 Warrant Officer Class I Ismail Hansi, King's African Rifles.
- Major (temporary) Charles Norman Harding (245154), Royal Army Ordnance Corps.
- Major (Quartermaster) Phillip Alexandra Harding (45330), Royal Corps of Signals.
- Major Humphrey le Fleming Fairfax Harvey (22816), Royal Artillery.
- No. 2315033 Warrant Officer Class I John Henry Harrison, Royal Corps of Signals.
- No. 13019092 Warrant Officer Class I James Hennessey, Pioneer Corps.
- Major (temporary) Peter Henry Hobbs (190792), Royal Army Veterinary Corps.
- Major (temporary) Jack Hodgkiss (191047), Royal Engineers.
- Major (temporary) Frederick Robert Hornby (115085), Royal Corps of Signals.
- Major (temporary) Charles Leslie Howard (127021), Royal Army Service Corps.
- Major Rupert Howard (11251), Royal Army Pay Corps.
- No. 7262376 Warrant Officer Class II Alexander Hunter, Royal Army Medical Corps.
- No. 3766211 Warrant Officer Class I William Baldwin Hudson, The Queen's Own Cameron Highlanders.
- Yuzbashi Zein El Abdin Eff Ibrahim, Sudan Defence Force Medical Corps.
- No. 17729 Warrant Officer Class I Mohamed Bin Indem, East Africa Corps of Military Police.
- Lieutenant-Colonel (acting) Alan Alfred Isaac (275929), Army Cadet Force.
- Major (temporary) Eric Standish Jackson, MC (102355), The Royal Warwickshire Regiment.
- Captain (Quartermaster) Ivan Ernest Jacques (120649), The East Lancashire Regiment.
- Major (temporary) William Emrys Jones (149322), The Royal Welch Fusiliers.
- Major (acting) Max Karo (283065), Army Cadet Force.
- No. 4383993 Warrant Officer Class I Raymond Kirk, Coldstream Guards.
- Lieutenant-Colonel (temporary) Cyril Denzil Milner Kitchin (109802), Royal Artillery.
- Major (temporary) Philip Harold Knighton (191374), Royal Engineers.
- Captain (temporary) Peter Law (124515), Army Air Corps.
- Captain Charles Robert Leach (31533), New Zealand Military Forces.
- Chaplain to the Forces 4th Class The Reverend Donald Rathbone Lee (230883), Royal Army Chaplains' Department.
- Lieutenant-Colonel (temporary) Sir Christopher Robert Lighton, Bt (98612), retired pay, late the King's Royal Rifle Corps.
- Major (temporary) Lionel Popham Lock (139251), The Wiltshire Regiment (Duke of Edinburgh's).
- Lieutenant (Assistant Commissary) Frederick Lowry (CC 114), Indian Army Corps of Clerks.
- Major (Quartermaster) George Lucioni (104935), Royal Army Service Corps.
- Major (temporary) John William Lupton (107648), Royal Army Ordnance Corps.
- Junior Commander Anne Dick Macdonald (192441), Auxiliary Territorial Service.
- Major (temporary) John White MacGillivray, General List, East Africa Forces.
- No. 7885194 Warrant Officer Class I (acting) Lloyd Horace Mackintosh, Indian Electrical & Mechanical Engineers.
- Subadar Major and Honorary Lieutenant Mahsud Gul Khan, Sardar Bahadur, OBI, 15th Punjab Regiment, Indian Army.
- Captain (Quartermaster) Frank Percy Malyon (137689), Royal Artillery.
- Major (temporary) Donald Frederick Marshall (EC 6985), Indian Army.
- No. 1847805 Warrant Officer Class II Herbert Hector Mason, Royal Engineers.
- Captain (acting) John Glassford McMillan (215155), Union Defence Force.
- Major (temporary) William Percy Meldrum (65133), Army Educational Corps.
- Captain (Quartermaster) Archibald William Miller (131713), Royal Artillery.
- Major (temporary) James King Miller (42178), Army Educational Corps.
- Jemadar Mohd Khalid (24387-10), Indian Signal Corps, Indian Army.
- Major (temporary) William Francis Morgan (185915), Royal Engineers.
- No. 1694751 Warrant Officer Class II James Creed Morris, Intelligence Corps.
- Major (temporary) David Kinnell Morrison (75310), Royal Engineers.
- Captain Cyril Kaye Moseley, Superintendent of Police, Bechuanaland Protectorate.
- Major Edgar William Moyes, MC, ED (AF 1008), The Madras Guards, Auxiliary Force (India).
- No. 17836 Warrant Officer Class I Charles George Murr, Royal Electrical and Mechanical Engineers.
- Captain (temporary) Ghulam Nabi (IEC 4554), 6th Rajputana Rifles, Indian Army.
- Lieutenant-Colonel (acting) Patrick Hay Montgomery Nelson (EC 347), Royal Indian Army Ordnance Corps.
- No. 2745398 Warrant Officer-Class II William Henry Oliver, The Black Watch (Royal Highland Regiment).
- Major George Evelyn Lucas Pardington, TD (7527), The Queen's Own Royal West Kent Regiment.
- Lieutenant Victor Robert Parker (236160), The Royal Corps of Signals.
- Captain (temporary) Edwin John Pateman (EC 1651), Intelligence Corps, Indian Army.
- Major (temporary) Ernest Arthur Pearce (70259), Royal Army Service Corps.
- Major (Commissary) Robert Stanley Peverley (ST 26), Royal Indian Army Service Corps.
- Major (temporary) George John Phillips (106767), Royal Engineers.
- Lieutenant-Colonel (acting) Emanuel Sam Philpott (EC 7759), Indian Army.
- Major (temporary) Frederick Thomas Pitt (103548), Royal Corps of Signals.
- Chief Commander Isobel Powell (192095), Auxiliary Territorial Service.
- Major (temporary) James Arthur Ramsay (101400), Royal Artillery.
- Major (temporary) the Right Honourable Robert John Farquharson, Baron Remnant (48289), Reserve of Officers, The Royal Berkshire Regiment (Princess Charlotte of Wales's).
- Major (temporary) Charles Vezey Edward Rooker, MM (89887), Royal Army Pay Corps.
- Major Cyril Arthur Rowland (13240), Royal Indian Army Service Corps.
- Major (temporary) Herbert James Saunders (E.C.2412), 1st Punjab Regiment, Indian Army.
- Captain Stanley Scudamore, Jamaica Home Guard.
- Major (temporary) Gervase Bruce Seaton (E.C.3604), Indian Engineers.
- No. 2066380 Warrant Officer Class II Vincent Havelock Sedgwick, Royal Corps of Signals.
- Lieutenant Harold Shacklady (154277), Royal Engineers.
- Subadar Major Sher Sing Rana (I.O.5972), 18th Royal Garhwal Rifles, Indian Army.
- Major (temporary) Denys Hunter Aubrey-Smith (99950), The Somerset Light Infantry (Prince Albert's).
- Captain (temporary) Cecil Roland Heathcote-Smith (231598), Intelligence Corps.
- Major (temporary) (Deputy Commissary) John Smith (M.E.S.678), Indian Engineers.
- Captain J. Snee, MC, Commander of Trinidad Home Guard Unit.
- Lieutenant-Colonel (acting) Ralph Alfred Erskine Somerville, MC, MM (11975), Reserve of Officers, Royal Artillery.
- Major Harold Cecil Soundy, MC, TD (7017), Royal Artillery, Territorial Army.
- Major Frederick Albert Spencer, MC (4817), Royal Armoured Corps.
- No. 159343 Warrant Officer Class I Alan Hewson Steel, Royal Army Service Corps.
- No. 103831 Warrant Officer Class I Reginald Tom Stocker, Royal Army Service Corps.
- Captain William George Stray (137631), The Durham Light Infantry.
- Major (temporary) John Henry Sturgeon (168576), Royal Engineers.
- Major (temporary) George William Talbot, BEM (110057), General List.
- Captain Hugh Cameron Temple, Superintendent of Police, Swaziland.
- Major (temporary) Hugh Berners Thacker (101820), Royal Artillery.
- Lieutenant-Colonel Thakar Jawahir Singh, Jodhpur State Forces, Indian Army.
- Lieutenant-Colonel (acting) James William Thompson, DCM (275164), Army Cadet Force.
- No. 2917 Warrant Officer Class I Walter Henry Thornborough, Royal Army Service Corps.
- No. 1859607 Warrant Officer Class I James Alfred Percival Tilsley, Royal Engineers.
- Lieutenant-Colonel (temporary) William Henry John Underhill (EC 1472), Indian Army Ordnance Corps.
- Major (temporary) William Henry Vickers, AMICE, MIStructE (151501), Royal Engineers.
- Captain (Quartermaster) Francis Waddell Waddell (199757), The Essex Regiment.
- No. 1059594 Warrant Officer Class II Thomas Walker, Indian Army Corps of Clerks.
- Major (temporary) Cecil Victor Wattenbach, MC (100057), The Buffs (Royal East Kent Regiment).
- No. 725729 Warrant Officer Class I Frederick James West, Pioneer Corps.
- Major (temporary) Wilfred Henry White (51780), Reserve of Officers, The Lincolnshire Regiment.
- Major (local Lieutenant-Colonel) Bertie St. Clair Wilks, Indian Army Ordnance Corps.
- Major (temporary) Gerald Wills (97617), Royal Artillery, Territorial Army.
- Major (local Lieutenant-Colonel) Henry Peterkin Charnock-Wilson (62196), The King's Shropshire Light Infantry.
- Captain (temporary) Michael Douglas Wimbush (161433), Royal Engineers.
- No. 30588 Warrant Officer Glass I May Florence Wise, Auxiliary Territorial Service.
- Captain (temporary) Maurice Lascelles Wood (269287), Royal Engineers.
- Junior Commander (temporary) Rosamond Helen Woodburn (196346), Auxiliary Territorial Service.
- Lieutenant-Colonel (temporary) (Commissary) Thomas Woodcock (O.S. 12), Indian Army Ordnance Corps.
- No. 34560 Warrant Officer Class I Stanley Woods, Indian Engineers.
- Major Ernest Victor Cash, Australian Military Forces.
- Captain Reginald Horace Eades, Australian Military Forces.
- Major Henry Lawrence Foster, MC, Australian Military Forces.
- Major John Channon Rishworth, Australian Military Forces.
- Senior Commander Jean Neill Erwin, New Zealand Women's Army Auxiliary Corps.
- Major John Robert Griffin, New Zealand Military Forces.
- Warrant Officer Class I John Narbey, New Zealand Military Forces.
- Major (temporary) Frank Leonard Rees, New Zealand Military Forces.

Royal Air Force

- Wing Commander Thomas Sutherland Mackay (Can/C.6540), RCAF.
- Wing Commander William Steele (35246).
- Wing Commander Alfred Victor Tarlton (44234).
- Wing Commander George Alfred Wells (74835), RAFVR.
- Acting Wing Commander Eric Shipworth Benson (81815), RAFVR.
- Acting Wing Commander Reginald Chadwick, MC, DCM (113708), RAFVR.
- Acting Wing Commander David Lawrence Clackson (90087), AAF.
- Acting Wing Commander John Hector Currie (73865).
- Acting Wing Commander Robert Camille Samuel Levy (114363), RAFVR.
- Acting Wing Commander Alfred Harold Love (15153), RAFO.
- Acting Wing Commander Claude Jess Metcalfe (81497), RAFVR.
- Acting Wing Commander William Herbert Moyles (44240).
- Acting Wing Commander Edward May Nicol, DSM (73469), RAFVR.
- Acting Wing Commander Cyril William North Raymond (73361), RAFVR.
- Acting Wing Commander Norman Spencer Roupell (183691), RAFVR.
- Acting Wing Commander William Osbert Whittick (75376), RAFVR.
- Squadron Leader Derek Charles Loseby Chidell (83262), RAFVR.
- Squadron Leader Charles Harold Dyson, DFC (40172).
- Squadron Leader Frederic Hubert Finnis (115733), RAFVR.
- Squadron Leader John Holt (23106).
- Squadron Leader John Thompson Lean (74163), RAFVR.
- Squadron Leader Albert Lionel Southey, Rhodesian Air Askari Corps.
- Acting Squadron Leader John Carruthers Archibald (85438), RAFVR.
- Acting Squadron Leader Reginald Wesson Ashford (101740), RAFVR.
- Acting Squadron Leader Monty Morris Berman (101767), RAFVR.
- Acting Squadron Leader Ernest Richard Bolton (46262).
- Acting Squadron Leader Dennis Booth, DFC (117355), RAFVR.
- Acting Squadron Leader Harold Sydney Clark (44960).
- Acting Squadron Leader John Alan Cope (100753), RAFVR.
- Acting Squadron Leader Reginald Maurice Cracknell (87177), RAFVR.
- Acting Squadron Leader Maurice Henry Disney (62737), RAFVR.
- Acting Squadron Leader Robert William Draper (83317), RAFVR.
- Acting Squadron Leader Norman Cunningham Farries (46745).
- Acting Squadron Leader Francis Edward Frayn (77203), RAFVR.
- Acting Squadron Leader William Goodridge (45267).
- Acting Squadron Leader Higford Singer Griffiths, DFC (106846), RAFVR.
- Acting Squadron Leader John Samuel Herring, Southern Rhodesian Air Force.
- Acting Squadron Leader Geoffrey Dirk Stewart Horsfall (77958).
- Acting Squadron Leader John William Prince Kipps (105917), RAFVR.
- Acting Squadron Leader David Livingston (68304), RAFVR.
- Acting Squadron Leader Hector Munro Louch (84685), RAFVR.
- Acting Squadron Leader Ernest Arthur Luce (103335), RAFVR.
- Acting Squadron Leader John Robert Macgregor (89018), RAFVR.
- Acting Squadron Leader Lawrence Malec (70442), RAFVR.
- Acting Squadron Leader Cyril Henry Mathias (74533), RAFVR.
- Acting Squadron Leader Jack Moore (46379).
- Acting Squadron Leader William Richard Morgans (46752).
- Acting Squadron Leader Leonard Pagram (47190).
- Acting Squadron Leader Charles Henry Palmer (44244).
- Acting Squadron Leader Francis Mervyn Panzetta (66412).
- Acting Squadron Leader William Albert Redverse Pepper (60408), RAFVR.
- Acting Squadron Leader Johnstone Bolton Robertson, DFM (44752).
- Acting Squadron Leader Arnold Paul Robinson (Can/C.16013), RCAF.
- Acting Squadron Leader Cyril William Roebuck (85320), RAFVR.
- Acting Squadron Leader Herbert Thomas Rushton (64151), RAFVR.
- Acting Squadron Leader Walter Savory (71865), RAFO.
- Acting Squadron Leader Harry Shaw (102324), RAFVR.
- Acting Squadron Leader Eric Montague Cooper Shipp (73396), RAFVR.
- Acting Squadron Leader Eric Coupland Spencer (63161), RAFVR.
- Acting Squadron Leader Robert Taylor (44389).
- Acting Squadron Leader Oliver Stuart Todd (78125), RAFVR.
- Acting Squadron Leader Arthur Claude Tokry (78489), RAFVR.
- Acting Squadron Leader Thomas Ure (82099), RAFVR.
- Acting Squadron Leader Edgar James Watts (45034).
- Acting Squadron Leader Henry Wilson (136581), RAFVR.
- Flight Lieutenant John Darral Ackerman (N.Z.404113), RNZAF.
- Flight Lieutenant James William Archer (63876), RAFVR.
- Flight Lieutenant George Rutherford Damant Atherstone (126840), RAFVR.
- Flight Lieutenant Gordon Cumming Barclay, Southern Rhodesian Air Force.
- Flight Lieutenant Christopher Henry Brock (71109), RAFVR.
- Flight Lieutenant Charles Edward Brooks (178379), RAFVR.
- Flight Lieutenant Gilbert Hamilton Campbell (65433), RAFVR.
- Flight Lieutenant George Douglas Cooper (47600).
- Flight Lieutenant Kenneth Cyril Earl (129002), RAFVR.
- Flight Lieutenant Ieuan Lynn Richard Evans (109117), RAFVR.
- Flight Lieutenant Robert Logan Ewing (138360), RAFVR.
- Flight Lieutenant Wilson Gordon Fell (122815), RAFVR.
- Flight Lieutenant Vergil Leroy Fiksdal (Can/C.21681), RCAF.
- Flight Lieutenant Alan Geoffrey Hardy (137263), RAFVR.
- Flight Lieutenant John Bonar Hodgson (Can/C.9221), RCAF.
- Flight Lieutenant James Hood (118125), RAFVR.
- Flight Lieutenant Kenneth Stewart Lockie (85829).
- Flight Lieutenant William Mathew Lower (Can/C.8042), RCAF.
- Flight Lieutenant William McFaull (Can/C.8116), RCAF.
- Flight Lieutenant Stanley Edward Malouf (Can/C.4994), RCAF.
- Flight Lieutenant Edward William Merriman, DFM (137289), RAFVR.
- Flight Lieutenant James Robert Mitchell (48859), RAFVR.
- Flight Lieutenant Francis William Morgan (86966), RAFVR.
- Flight Lieutenant Ross Emil Salvesen (87748), RAFVR.
- Flight Lieutenant Willie Snowden (45611).
- Flight Lieutenant Lionel Robert Traill Wasey (120368), RAFVR.
- Flight Lieutenant John Whitaker (48998).
- Flight Lieutenant Robert Hugh Finlay Whiteside (81531).
- Captain Stanley Norman Brace (P.408V), SAAF.
- Captain William Albert Gillham (P.763V), SAAF.
- Acting Flight Lieutenant William John Bell (Can/C.15953), RCAF.
- Acting Flight Lieutenant Stephen Archbold Bergen (52437), RAFVR.
- Acting Flight Lieutenant Jack Reginald Blackford (135851), RAFVR.
- Acting Flight Lieutenant Alexander George Brand (124375), RAFVR.
- Acting Flight Lieutenant Henry Lees Buckley (102949), RAFVR.
- Acting Flight Lieutenant Eric Burchmore (49361).
- Acting Flight Lieutenant Charles Henry Burder (138674), RAFVR.
- Acting Flight Lieutenant Alfred James Cleasby (69032), RAFVR.
- Acting Flight Lieutenant William Edwin Collins (46362).
- Acting Flight Lieutenant William Friend (143525), RAFVR.
- Acting Flight Lieutenant Anthony Fry (102636), RAFVR.
- Acting Flight Lieutenant Alexander Morrison Hearn (120002), RAFVR.
- Acting Flight Lieutenant Jack Edward Higgins (48574).
- Acting Flight Lieutenant Roy George Huxtable (110381), RAFVR.
- Acting Flight Lieutenant Douglas Samuel Jones (110236), RAFVR.
- Acting Flight Lieutenant Robert Angus Kerr (112176), RAFVR.
- Acting Flight Lieutenant Hugh McGilvray McBryde (108730), RAFVR.
- Acting Flight Lieutenant David William McEwEn (50087).
- Acting Flight Lieutenant Joseph Bernard Mahony (51764).
- Acting Flight Lieutenant George Edward Marx (66097), RAFVR.
- Acting Flight Lieutenant Frederick Norman Maskell (117270), RAFVR.
- Acting Flight Lieutenant Edward Joseph Mason (49130).
- Acting Flight Lieutenant Arnold Pounds Obank (143636), RAFVR.
- Acting Flight Lieutenant John Frederick Rae (50216).
- Acting Flight Lieutenant Frederick Roman (48809).
- Acting Flight Lieutenant William Alfred Rumble (139766), RAFVR.
- Acting Flight Lieutenant Charles Abbott Smith (68256), RAFVR.
- Acting Flight Lieutenant Ronald Henry Ward (50 80).
- Acting Flight Lieutenant Harry Haslam Woodglover (121755), RAFVR.
- Acting Captain Vivian Voss (123307V), SAAF.
- Flying Officer Roland Millhouse (134878), RAFVR.
- Flying Officer David Colyer Nutting (102641), RAFVR.
- Flying Officer John Clement Perkins (138579), RAFVR.
- Flying Officer Theodore Grimmer Raynham (49523).
- Lieutenant Johan Hendrik Dragt (P.449V), SAAF.
- Lieutenant Denis Anthony Greyvensteyn (81978V), SAAF.
- Warrant Officer William Bennett (366023).
- Warrant Officer Eric George Bowden (514439).
- Warrant Officer Brian de Burton (590997).
- Warrant Officer Cecil James Butler (364478).
- Warrant Officer Victor Cecil Carey (506729).
- Warrant Officer Frank John Reed Clegg (343916).
- Warrant Officer Arthur Leonard Cockerline (248608).
- Warrant Officer John James Deslauriers (Can/C.2455), RCAF.
- Warrant Officer John Frederick David Godden (560171).
- Warrant Officer Norman William Howlett (330861).
- Warrant Officer Robert Preston Nelson (364916).
- Warrant Officer Edwin Roberts (365610).
- Warrant Officer Stanley Frederick Smith (331121).
- Warrant Officer James William Sutherland (350265).
- Acting Warrant Officer Chriss Alan Higham (513319).
- Acting Warrant Officer Ronald George Thomas (551182).
- Wing Officer Frances Agnes Joynson Wreford (549), WAAF.
- Squadron Officer Lady Dorothy Bowhill (392), WAAF.
- Squadron Officer Norah Louise McNeil Warren (241), WAAF.
- Flight Officer Agnes Emily Davies (2761), WAAF.
- Flight Officer Stella Roy Taylor (1310), WAAF.
- Flight Officer Anne Beatrice Walker (1465), WAAF.
- Acting Flight Officer Joan Bradbury (4902), WAAF.
- Acting Flight Officer Betty Rose Bradford (5570), WAAF.
- Squadron Leader Gordon McLeod Andrews, RAAF.
- Squadron Leader Robert Barbour, RAAF.
- Squadron Leader William Charles Thompson, RAAF.
- Flight Lieutenant Henry Charles Hudson, RNZAF.
- Section Officer Mary Katrine Loughnan, Royal New Zealand Women's Auxiliary Air Force.

Civil Division

- Helen Marion Arbuthnot, British Information Services, New York.
- Harvey Donald Barlow, British subject resident in the Belgian Congo.
- Eileen Daggett, attached to a Department of the Foreign Office.
- Charles Joseph Devey, Head Staff Clerk, Sudan Government.
- Violet Froom, British subject resident in Switzerland.
- Frederick William John Gale, Managing Director, S.G. Brown Ltd, Watford.
- Christos Nicholas Halkias, British Vice-Consul at Salonica.
- Madge Hinds, Assistant Archivist at His Majesty's Embassy at Washington.
- Philippa Creighton Levicky, attached to a Department of the Foreign Office.
- Lewis Arthur Oates, British Vice-Consul at Miami.
- Wilfred Winchester Puleston, British Vice-Consul at La Plata.
- Ernest Edward Spurgeon, MVO, Head Chancery Servant at His Majesty's Embassy at Paris.
- Estelle Thompson, Headmistress of the English Girls' School at Istanbul.
- Francis Herbert Trethewey, British Vice-Consul at Horta.
- Herbert William Whyman, British subject resident in Persia.
- Richard Edward Wilkinson, British Vice-Consul at Smyrna.
- Grace Jardine Balfour, President, Corner Brook Branch, Women's Patriotic Association, Newfoundland.
- Margaret Ellen Brittan, Principal, St. Catherine's School, Maseru, Basutoland.
- Alice Elizabeth Cheale, Assistant Secretary, Victoria League.
- Captain Alfred George Cook. For services in connection with the Branch of the British Empire Service League in Southern Rhodesia.
- Henry Burton Crawford, Foreman of Ship repairs, St. John's Harbour, Newfoundland, and formerly Chief Engineer of Coastal Steamers and Refrigerator Engineer, Newfoundland Railway.
- Bevis George Gundry, Agricultural Engineer, Department of Agriculture, Southern Rhodesia.
- Walter Hughes Halls. For services in connection with the British South Africa Police Regimental Association, Southern Rhodesia.
- Lucy Hone, a Member of the Children's Welfare Board, State of South Australia.
- Agnes Gait Houston. For services in connection with the work of the Empire Societies War Hospitality Committee in Scotland.
- Mabel Charlotte White Jarvis, Honorary Secretary, Salisbury Branch, National War Fund, Southern Rhodesia.
- Iris Evelyn McLaggan, of Mahalapye, Bechuanaland Protectorate. For voluntary services on behalf of war charities and women's organisations.
- Doris Pemberton Methuen. For valuable work in connection with unofficial Service organisations in Southern Rhodesia.
- Wilfred Wallace Osborne, JP. For public and philanthropic services in the City of Hobart, State of Tasmania.
- Major Herbert Hubert Rochester, Officer Commanding, British South Africa Police Reserve.
- Thomas Henry Woollacott. For municipal and patriotic services in the District of Burra, State of South Australia.
- The Reverend Alexander Tulloch Robertson Yuille. For services in connection with the work of the Empire Societies War Hospitality Committee in Scotland.
- Dev Priya Bali, LRCP, MRCS, DMRE, Women's Medical Service, Deputy Inspector-General of Civil Hospitals (Women), United Provinces.
- Nella Bartlett (Wife of Mr. L. H. Bartlett, OBE, MLA, of the Central Provinces Manganese Ore Co. Ltd.), Nagpur, Central Provinces and Berar.
- Homai Jal Batliwala (Wife of Mr. Jal J. Batliwala, Deputy Chief Accounts Officer (officiating), Madras and Southern Mahratta Railway), Madras.
- May Wilson Cox, Queen's Army Schoolmistress, British Army Children's School, Bombay.
- Marjorie Beatrice Elphinston (Wife of Mr. C. Elphinston, Messrs. Parry & Co. Ltd.), Madras.
- Hope Lucas, Nursing Superintendent, Bowring & Lady Curzon Hospitals, Bangalore.
- Deirdre Macfarlane (Wife of Lieutenant Colonel W. Macfarlane of the Seaforth Highlanders), Lady Commandant, Central Command Leave Hostel, Naini Tal, United Provinces.
- Solomon David Aaron, Assistant Field Controller of Military Accounts.
- John Baldwin, Deputy Superintendent of Police (retired), ARP Controller, Bombay.
- Bibhuti Bhushan Banarji, Indian Police, Superintendent of Police (officiating), Orissa.
- William Francis Bennett Beale, Superintendent, Special Jail, Berhampore, Murshidabad, Bengal.
- William Berry, Professor, Punjab College of Engineering and Technology, Lahore, Punjab.
- Probhat Kumar Biswas, Civil Assistant Surgeon, Bengal.
- William Carruthers, Works Manager, Barsi Light Railway, Kurduwadi, Sholapur District, Bombay.
- Subramanian Chakravarthi, Indian Civil Service, Under-Secretary, to the Government of India in the War Transport Department.
- Washeswar Nath Datta, Commandant, British Evacuee Camp, Coimbatore.
- Frank Arthur Dignum, District Commandant, Hare Street Civic Guards, Bengal.
- Captain Fateh Muhammad, Member, Punjab Legislative Assembly, Assistant Recruiting Officer, Gujrat, Punjab.
- George Feakins, Officer Supervisor, Quartermaster-General's Branch, General Headquarters, India.
- Major Charles Ernest Fox, Deputy Controller of Army Factory Accounts, Calcutta.
- Babu Saroj Kumar Ghosh, Provincial Secretary, Boy Scouts Association, Bengal.
- Sudhamoy Ghosh, Professor of Chemistry and Physics, School of Tropical Medicine, Calcutta, Bengal.
- Charles Hoyle, General Staff Branch, General Headquarters, India.
- Gordon Noel Jackson, Indian Political Service, lately Political Agent, Kuwait, Persian Gulf.
- Thomas Kidd, Deputy Director, Railway Board, New Delhi.
- Kunja Behari Mohan Lal, Indian Forest Service, Divisional Forest Officer, Lakhimpur, Dibrugarh, Assam.
- Reginald Albert Labern, Officer for War Services Work, Higher Executive Grade, Office of the High Commissioner for India, London.
- Madandhari Singh, Zamindar, Village Dharahra, Dinapore Sub-division, Patna District, Bihar.
- Ernest William Matthew, Director, Department of Food, Government of India.
- Tribhovandas Bhagwandas Merchant, Deputy Controller of Purchase in the Office of the Chief Controller of Purchase (Munitions), Department of Supply, Government of India.
- Mohammed Nazir Mirza, BSc. Divisional Engineer, Telephones, Delhi Division, Posts & Telegraphs, New Delhi.
- Belmar Krishnamurthy Nanjunda Rao, Tata Air Lines.
- Khan Sahib Maulvi Nur Bakhsh, Pleader, Administrator, Dera Ismail Khan Municipality, North-West Frontier Province.
- Kenneth Parbery, General Staff Branch, General Headquarters, India.
- Khan Bahadur Rustomji Pestonji Patel, Merchant and Contractor, Jamshedpur, Bihar.
- Captain Francis Fenwick Pearson, Indian Political Service, lately Under-Secretary, Political Department, India.
- Beni Pershad, Advocate, Ambala City, Punjab.
- Frank Harold Pomphrey, Director of Music, His Excellency the Governor's Band, Madras.
- Vilhelm Schielderup Risoe, Director, Electrical Engineering, Department of Supply, Government of India.
- Thomas Edward Rogers, Indian Political Service, His Britannic Majesty's Consul, Bushire, Persian Gulf.
- Keith Cotton Roy, Indian Civil Service, Private Secretary to the Finance Member.
- Francis Randel Sanger, Assistant Secretary, Office of the Military Secretary to His Excellency the Viceroy.
- Victor Alexander Newell Sausman, Deputy Conservator of Forests on Special Duty as Land Improvement Officer, South Circle, Bombay.
- Robert William Scott, lately Assistant Commissioner, Nicobar Islands.
- Lancelot George Sibley, Assistant Inspector of Guns, Cossipore, Bengal.
- Rai Bahadur Nanda Lai Sinha, Deputy Magistrate and Deputy Collector (retired), Elections Officer, Bihar.
- Manohar Lail Sood, Indian Service of Engineers, Executive Engineer, Public Works Department, Irrigation Branch, United Provinces.
- Captain John Amyot Steward, Indian Political Service, Deputy Commissioner, Mardan, North-West Frontier Province.
- Arthur Cleveland Turner, Controller of Stores, Madras and Southern Mahratta Railway.
- Badri Nath Uppal, PhD, Plant Pathologist to the Government of Bombay.
- Harry Hutchings Waynforth, Acting District Engineer, Bengal Nagpur Railway, Khargpur.
- Arthur Antony Whitley, Assistant Controller (Headquarters), Office of the Controller of Printing & Stationery, New Delhi.
- William John Wood, Assistant Military Secretary, Military Secretary's Branch, General Headquarters, India.
- Alva Adeline Daniell, MB, BS, MRCS, LRCP, DTM, Civil Assistant Surgeon, Civil Medical Department, Government of Burma.
- Govindapuram Ramachandra Rajagopaul, Deputy Legal Adviser to the Government of Burma.
- Amanfi III, Omanhene of Asebu. For public services in the Gold Coast.
- Vera Jean Anderson. For welfare services in Kenya.
- Emanuel Calleja, Superintendent of Police, Malta.
- Frederick Brian Coulson, Chief Clerk and Deputy Registrar of Lands Department, Northern Rhodesia.
- Marjorie Darwent. For welfare services in Trinidad.
- Joseph George Gardner, Mechanical Transport Superintendent, Public Works Department, Tanganyika Territory.
- Helen Glover. For public services in Nyasaland.
- Ethel Grace Jarrett. For public services in St. Helena.
- Jehan Khan, Chief of Customs, Government of Mukalla, Aden.
- Marjorie Kelly. For welfare services in Ceylon.
- Emanuel Gittens Knight, Senior Magistrate, Grenada, Windward Islands.
- Eugenie Minnie Lee. For welfare services in Nigeria.
- Agnes Leslie. For welfare services in Ceylon.
- Atallah Jacob Mantoura, District Officer, Palestine.
- Chandulal Kalidas Patel. For public services in Uganda.
- Walter Charles Shankland. For public services in British Guiana.
- May Thornton Jeffrey-Smith, Head Mistress, West Wood School, Jamaica.
- Frank Lewis Stevens, Colonial Postal Service, Assistant Engineer, Posts & Telegraphs Department, Kenya.
- May Dorothy Turnbull. For welfare services in Nigeria.
- Adi Maraia Vosawale. For welfare services in Fiji.
- John Edward Wriqht, FRCS, Colonial Medical Service, Surgeon Specialist, Holbarton Hospital, Antigua, Leeward Islands.
- Jean Wynne. For welfare services in Barbados.

Honorary Members

- Joseph Brookman Amissah Abadoo, late Assistant Secretary, Nigerian Secretariat.
- Abraham Diskin, Assessing Officer, Income Tax Department, Tel Aviv, Palestine.
- Madame Hajja Mukarram Abu Khadra. For social services in Palestine.
- Abdel Halim Sakit, Captain in the Arab Legion.

=== Order of the Companions of Honour (CH) ===
- The Right Reverend Henry Herbert Williams, DD, Bishop of Carlisle.

=== Companion of the Imperial Service Order (ISO) ===
Dominion Civil Services

- Vivien Frederic Ellenberger, District Commissioner, Bechuanaland Protectorate.
- Frederick Alexander Marr, Provincial Native Commissioner, Southern Rhodesia.
- Erick Edward Philip, Secretary, Department of Internal Affairs, Southern Rhodesia.
- Walter John Spafford, Director of Agriculture, State of South Australia.

Indian Civil Services

- Rai Bahadur Prafulla Kumar Ghosh, Manager, Bhowal Court of Wards Estate, Dacca, Bengal.
- Bertrand Paul Grice, Assistant Secretary, Finance Department, Government of India.
- Herbert Fitzroy Llewellyn, Chief Draughtsman, Loco. & Carriage Department, Bombay, Baroda and Central India Railway, Ajmer.
- Lovell Grant Pigott, BEM, Postmaster, Simla.

Colonial Service

- Panayiotis Haji Yangou Atteshilis, Superintendent, Government Printing Office, Cyprus.
- Caetano Salvador Baptista, Cashier, Kenya.
- Herbert Boon, MBE, lately Administrator, Antigua, Leeward Islands.
- Alexander Fernandes Camacho, Steward, Public Hospital, Georgetown, British Guiana.
- Daniel MacNaughton Cavers, Chief Instructor, Kampala Technical School, Uganda.
- Peter Paul Decesare, Clerk of Councils, Malta.
- Robert Charles Farquhar, Engineer, Department of Posts & Telegraphs, Fiji.
- John Aldam Flin, Examiner, Central Office, Colonial Audit Department.
- Walter Hampden Harris, Acting Magistrate, Trinidad.
- Samuel Ernest Joah, Accountant, Treasury, Sierra Leone.
- Roger Gates, Engineering Inspector, Crown Agents for the Colonies.
- Christopher Wilberforce Prescod, Inspector of Schools, St. Vincent, Windward Islands.
- Ernest John Smith, Chief Accountant, Nigeria Railway.
- Christopher Ernest Edmund Stork, Registrar, Supreme Court, Ceylon.
- Christopher Babatunde Ojo-Akande Williams, Examiner, Grade I, Audit Department, Nigeria.

=== Kaisar-i-Hind Medal ===
- Ariadne Mavis, Lady Clow (wife of His Excellency Sir Andrew Clow, KCSI, CIE, Governor of Assam).
- Irene Bose (wife of the Honourable Mr. Justice Vivian Bose), Central Provinces and Berar.
- Jessie Findlay, MD (Manitoba), Principal and Professor of Surgery, Women's Medical College, Vellore, North Arcot, Madras.
- Margaret, Lady Penny (wife of Sir James Penny, KCIE, CSI, ICS, Financial Commissioner, Development, Punjab).
- Bruce Lyman Carruthers, MD, CM, FACP, Director, Medical Centre, Miraj.
- The Reverend Banardo Nansen Eade, Missionary in charge of Chandpur Christian Mission, Tippera, Bengal.

=== British Empire Medal (BEM) ===
Military Division
Royal Navy

- Chief Petty Officer (Torpedo Coxswain) Ronald Albert Adams, DSM. P/J.107099 (Portsmouth).
- Chief Electrical Artificer Edwin Samuel John Arscott, D/MX.52156 (Devonport).
- Colour Sergeant John Attwood, RM. Ply.18366.
- Stoker Petty Officer Charles Bailey, C/KX.80310 (Hull).
- Chief Mechanician Jainuddin Bala, RIN.1428.
- Acting Chief Engine Room Artificer Harry Alfred Philip Barge, P/MX.51373 (Brighton).
- Colour Sergeant Reginald William Beasant, Po.17780, RM (Gosport).
- Petty Officer Wren Muriel Beckley, WRNS, 13842 (Manchester).
- Temporary Leading Writer Joseph Bell, C/MX.95232 (Carlisle).
- Chief Petty Officer William James Bell, D/234461 (Wallasey).
- Chief Petty Officer Cook (S) Arthur Edward Berrington, P/M.10416.
- Petty Officer Air Fitter (A) Gilbert Michael Boivin, FAA/FX.79845.
- Chief Petty Officer Chris Boniface, P/J.50118 (Liss).
- Chief Wren Gertrude Grace Boulton, WRNS.1844 (Birmingham).
- Engine Room Artificer. 2nd Class William Thomas Harry Bowden, D/MX.55670.
- Chief Petty Officer George Robert Braddick, D/J.115380 (Brixham).
- Engine Room Artificer 4th Class Joseph John Brazier, C/MX.96157 (Bierton).
- Stoker Petty Officer William Owen Brazier, C/KX.98941.
- Chief Wren Beatrice Mary Browne, WRNS, 2.
- Chief Petty Officer Frank Wilfred Burfitt, P/J.9952
- Chief Petty Officer Telegraphist Owen Edward Burgess, C/J.41138.
- Petty Officer William Thomas Eli Butland, R/JX.174883.
- Sick Berth Chief Petty Officer John Campbell, C/MX.45935.
- Leading Wren Writer Joan Catchpole, WRNS.16720 (Bury St. Edmunds).
- Chief Petty Officer Writer William James Churchward, D/344171 (Plymouth).
- Acting Able Seaman Edwin Clayton, C/JX.183956 (Peterborough).
- Master-at-Arms John Edward Colley, P/M.35738 (Kingston upon Thames).
- Petty Officer Rigger George William Colville, C/JX.164623.
- Chief Petty Officer Eugene Jeram Conlon, P/J.31000.
- Chief Stoker William Costello, D/KX.78602 (Plymouth).
- Stoker Petty Officer Archibald Ernest James Cox, P/KX.83633 (Birmingham).
- Temporary Petty Officer Arthur John Cox, P/J.42093 (Gillingham).
- Leading Wren Anne Cross, WRNS.8078 (Holyhead).
- Chief Wren Florence Crowther, WRNS.3373 (Gillingham).
- Quartermaster Sergeant (Temporary) Wilfred Ernest Davey, RM. Po.215327.
- Chief Yeoman of Signals Thomas Leonard Derrick, P/J.6719 (Portsmouth).
- Chief Shipwright Oliver John Doble, P/M.23054 (Portsmouth).
- Able Seaman Valentine John Dodson, P/JX.127030.
- Chief Petty Officer Harry Doidge, C/213436 (Tavistock).
- Leading Seaman Joseph Walter Douce, C/JX.170396.
- Chief Motor Mechanic 4th Class Alexander Duff, D/MX.92284 (Edinburgh).
- Petty Officer Rigger David Marshall Walker Dunlop, R/JX.176970.
- Leading Seaman Stanley George Eld, P/JX.215502 (Rickmansworth).
- Chief Shipwright Thomas Henry Elliott, C/345747 (London).
- Master at Arms William Henry Ellman, P/M.39922.
- Chief Petty Officer Shipwright Gwillyn Evans, CSP/R.238252 (Erith).
- Chief Stoker William Albert Farwell, C/K.12499 (Cfoydon).
- Chief Petty Officer George Fender, D/J.33242 (Corton Denham, Dorset).
- Chief Shipwright Percy Andrew Ferenback, D/345722 (Babbacombe).
- Temporary Regulating Petty Officer Hubert George Field, D/M.40274.
- Temporary Chief Engine Room Artificer Ronald Edward Fisher, C/MX.47937 (Shinfield, near Reading).
- Chief Petty Officer Telegraphist Albert Victor Fletcher, P/J.76784 (Bridlington).
- Chief Yeoman of Signals William Ernest Fletcher, P/J.37109 (Oxford).
- Chief Engine Room Artificer 1st Class William James Florence, DSM. P/M.22627.
- Ordnance Artificer 1st Class Clarence Cheslyn Foreman, D/M.37062 (Holyhead).
- Chief Petty Officer Gunner's Mate Albert Sydney Fountain, C/202767.
- Quartermaster Sergeant Instructor (Acting Regimental Sergeant Major) Herbert Frederick Pinnegar Fuller, Depot X.34, RM.
- Petty Officer Wren Norah Edith Gallagher, WRNS.2148 (Wallsend-on-Tyne).
- Chief Engine Room Artificer Arthur Daniel Gard, D/MX.52070.
- Chief Petty Officer Writer Maurice Gleeson, P/MX.46304 (Rosyth).
- Chief Petty Officer Writer George Arthur Goddard, P/M.3926 (Portsmouth).
- Chief Motor Mechanic 4th Class William Richard Goldswain, D/MX.68721 (Blofield, near Norwich).
- Chief Petty Officer Writer Henry Goodwin, C/MX.54089.
- Leading Seaman George Kirk Graham, P/JX.269625 (Markinch, Fife).
- Able Seaman John Donald Graham, C/JX.191560 (Stamford, Lines.).
- Colour Sergeant (Temporary) Nicholas Graham, R.M.E.11645 (Newcastle upon Tyne).
- Marine Charles Gulliver, RM, Po.8694 (Southsea).
- Chief Wren Margaret Farmer Halton, WRNS.11038.
- Marine (Acting Temporary Colour Sergeant) Herbert Edward Harris, RM. Ch.X.192781.
- Ordnance Artificer 1st Class Llewellyn James Harris, P/MX.52125 (Cosham).
- Petty Officer Wren Catherine Ellen Hart, WRNS.18337.
- Stores Chief Petty Officer James Harvey, D/M.37373 (Plymouth).
- Chief Petty Officer Cook Alexander Hassell, P/M.7461.
- Leading Seaman Philip Anthony Hellyer, LT/JX.180467 (Bognor Regis).
- Electrical Artificer 1st Class Horace Cyril Blewett Hewes, C/M.38105 (Worthing).
- Acting Petty Officer James Hindley, D/JX.165400 (Runcorn).
- Chief Mechanician Frederick Thomas Kingston, D/307084 (Wembley, Devon).
- Chief Engine Room Artificer Harry Holloway, C/M.11395 (Chesham).
- Petty Officer Wren Stella Holmes, WRNS.10577.
- Acting Leading Seaman Cyril Hood, C/J.109295 (Peacehaven).
- Chief Wren Cook (S) Louie May Hooper, P/568 WRNS (Southsea).
- Chief Petty Officer Telegraphist William Alfred Hooper, C/J.102432.
- Temporary Chief Petty Officer Sidney Edward Clarence Hughes, P/JX.153587 (Gosport).
- Chief Petty Officer Sheikh Hussain Ibrahim, R.I.N.1266.
- Chief Petty Officer Alexander Jappy, R/6762C.
- Petty Officer Gunner's Mate Albert Thompson Jennings, P/JX.142970 (Portsmouth).
- Shipwright 1st Class William Johns, C/344439 (Goodwick, Pembs.).
- Acting Able Seaman Ernest Henry Johnson, C/JX.184258 (Silvertown, E.16.).
- Chief Wren Olive King, WRNS.2668 (Ipswich).
- Chief Petty Officer Rigger Daniel Kirkpatrick, R/JX.184376.
- Chief Petty Officer Appuswamy Krishnamurthy, R.I.N.75267.
- Chief Petty Officer Telegraphist Bruce Lackland, P/J.68971 (Gosport).
- Chief Petty Officer Telegraphist Francis Albert Ralph Lansdowne, P/J.15037 (Potter's Bar).
- Chief Engine Room Artificer 1st Class Reginald Archibald Levin, C/272341 (Portland).
- Leading Writer Ernest James Ley, D/MX.583375 (Bude).
- Stores Chief Petty Officer John Lawrence Lineham, P/MX.46861.
- Petty Officer James Felix Luff, P/J.10625.
- Petty Officer Rigger John Adam Malcolmson, R/1422E.
- Engine Room Artificer 1st Class Richard John Marriott, DSM. D/M.24898 (St. Ives).
- Able Seaman William John May, D/J.1435 (Chapplesford, Hants).
- Chief Petty Officer William James Mellon, D/J.110647 (Plymouth).
- Chief Petty Officer Reginald Victor Millson, P/J.5424 (Hove).
- Chief Wren Nellie Elizabeth May Mitchell, WRNS.685.
- Regimental Quartermaster Sergeant John Thomas Morgan, RM. Ply.22441.
- Petty Officer James John Charles Morris, P/J.106082 (Gosham).
- Temporary Master-at-Arms Joseph John Morse, P/M.38145.
- Yeoman of Signals Stanley Mullen, C/223113 (Maidenhead).
- Chief Shipwright Albert Edward Nevill, P/M.16518.(Portsmouth).
- Chief Petty Officer Telegraphist Bernard Harris Newton, D/J.6644 (Plymouth).
- Leading Telegraphist Alec Oliver, D/J.90173 (Broxburn, Scotland).
- Chief Petty Officer Cook (S) Frederick Baden Powell Porter, C/M.32463.
- Petty Officer Wren Yvonne Emily Powell, WRNS.1482 (Plymouth).
- Staff Clerk William George Preston, RM. Ply.10992 (Norbury).
- Chief Petty Officer Charles James Pudney, C/J.1529 (Leicester).
- Colour Sergeant Bertram Frederick Firth Radford, RM. Ch.24782.
- Chief Petty Officer Writer Edwin Harry John James Rawlings, P/M.38347.
- Chief Petty Officer Telegraphist Stanley Redout, P/J.51938.
- Temporary Colour Sergeant John Reeve, R.M.E.10796.
- Second Hand John Reid, LT/JX.280535.
- Air Artificer 4th Class Donal John Bruce Ritchie, FAA/FX.76666 (Elton).
- Chief Petty Officer Thomas Guy Robertson, D/J.30869.
- Chief Petty Officer Kenneth Herbert James Robinson, P/J.109845.
- Leading Writer Leonard Round, C/MX.105306 (Walsall).
- Stoker Petty Officer Ernest Charles Rowe, D/K.2738 (Myler, nr. Falmouth).
- Temporary Stores Petty Officer Ernest Albert Saltmarsh, PD/X.94 (Gosport).
- Acting Leading Seaman Desmond Payler Samuelson, D/SSX.32451. Pietermaritzburg).
- Petty Officer Wren Dorothy Avriel Shipley, WRNS.16741.
- Shipwright 4th Class Arthur Reginald Shoobridge, C/MX.506185 (Great Yarmouth).
- Engineman James Slater, LT/X.3183U (Portsoy).
- Chief Shipwright Alexander George Smith, P/MX.46437 (Copnor).
- Chief Motor Mechanic 3rd Class William Nelson Smith, RCNVR. V46528 (Prince Albert, Sask.).
- Yeoman of Signals Henry Charles Stanton, D/JX.207131 (Plymouth).
- Chief Yeoman of Signals Frederick George Stone, C/J.17412.
- Chief Petty Officer Writer Sydney Francis Stone, D/MX.45858 (Devonport).
- Petty Officer Writer Walter Tait, P/MX.60883 (Aberdeen).
- Temporary Chief Petty Officer Charlie Tester, C/J.16791.
- Chief Petty Officer Christopher Thomas Thompson, C/J.894 (Sheldon, Co. Durham).
- Chief Motor Mechanic 3rd Class Alfred Henry Tickett, P/MX.68675 (Great Wakering, Essex).
- Wartime Chief Engineman Leonard Charles William Timson, LT/KX.110529.
- Leading Stores Assistant James Tran, P/MX.121003 (Glasgow).
- Chief Petty Officer Walter John Rowley Tregidgo, D/J.23819 (Twickenham).
- Stores Chief Petty Officer George John Turner, C/346449 (St. Albans).
- Chief Electrical Artificer Harold Turner, C/M. 34939.
- Sergeant (Temporary) Albert William Charles Vaughan, RM. Ply.X.120738 (Burnley).
- Able Seaman Edward Hubert Wake, C/JX.170831.
- Temporary Sergeant (Acting Temporary Colour Sergeant) Alfred Harry Wallbutton, RM. Po.X.100839.
- Chief Petty Officer Telegraphist Gordon Wearmouth, C/JX.133973.
- Chief Petty Officer Writer William Percy Wheeler, C/M.6895 (Frome).
- Petty Officer Wren Kathleen White, WRNS.2529 (Hull).
- Ordnance Artificer 4th Class Samuel Clifford Wilkinson, C/MX.92748 (Farnham Common, Bucks).
- Chief Petty Officer Writer Harry William Winter, P/MX.45086.
- Chief Petty Officer Edward Woodley, D/J.1308.
- Marine Fred Worsh, RM. Po.X.102061 (Burnley).
- Acting Petty Officer Richard Wright, LT/JX.224328 (Fleetwood).
- Chief Petty Officer Thomas Wriglesworth, C/JX.147521 (Hampstead).
- Chief Wren Teresa Louise Yorke, WRNS.12842.
- Stores Chief Petty Officer James Charles Dean, RNZN.

Army

- No. S/54238 Sergeant Ernest Alderson, Royal Army Service Corps.
- Gunner (local Warrant Officer Class I) Sidney Cliston Alexander, St. Helena Regiment.
- No. 5444177 Corporal Ernis Alexandrou, Intelligence Corps.
- No. S/10677376 Sergeant Henry Alexander Angus, Royal Army Service Corps.
- No. 7640295 Sergeant Kenneth Ashton, Royal Army Ordnance Corps.
- No. GC/24655 Company Sergeant-Major (acting) Joseph Asiedu, West African Army Medical Corps.
- No. 13012225 Sergeant Cecil Charles Baker, Pioneer Corps.
- No. 16157 Sergeant John Jamieson Scott Balfour, Royal Tank Regiment, Royal Armoured Corps.
- No. SLA/36008 Regimental Sergeant-Major (acting) Allie Bangura, Sierra Leone Regiment.
- No. 5824399 Sergeant George Albert Barclay, The Suffolk Regiment.
- No. 10692663 Private David Barker, Royal Army Service Corps.
- No. S/6098768 Staff Sergeant Cyril Frank Batchelor, Royal Army Service Corps.
- No. NA/2011 Battery Sergeant-Major Moman Beddi, Nigeria Regiment.
- No. 8230 Company Sergeant-Major (acting) Janie Begum, Women's Auxiliary Corps (India).
- No. 61672 Staff Sergeant Frank Douglas Belcher, Royal Army Service Corps.
- No. W/23708 Staff Sergeant Annie McLean Bell, Auxiliary Territorial Service.
- No. 7364038 Staff Sergeant Douglas Leonard Bell, Royal Army Medical Corps.
- No. 2036371 Sergeant William George Benham, Royal Artillery.
- No. 2335776 Sergeant Edward Norman Bennett, Royal Corps of Signals.
- No. 2373508 Lance-Corporal (acting) Edward George Collins Betteridge, Royal Corps of Signals.
- No. 2002920 Lance-Sergeant Leslie Raymond Bloy, Royal Engineers.
- No. 14323521 Private John Boyde, Royal Army Ordnance Corps.
- No. 3536251 Sergeant John Bradbury, The Manchester Regiment.
- No. 7582918 Sergeant James Brady, Royal Electrical and Mechanical Engineers.
- No. 7623865 Sergeant John Alfred Brady, Royal Army Ordnance Corps.
- No. W/515278 Staff Sergeant Norah Brierley, Voluntary Aid Detachment.
- No. GC/14954 Sergeant Emmanuel Kwa Bruce, Royal West African Frontier Force.
- No. W/8144 Corporal Ivy Mary Buck, Auxiliary Territorial Service.
- No. 3606717 Corporal Miles Bullough, Royal Corps of Signals.
- No. 7636419 Sergeant John Patrick Buckley, Royal Army Ordnance Corps.
- No. 7685186 Staff Sergeant Jack Burgess, Royal Engineers.
- No. CA/1222 Armourer Alia Bux, The King's African Rifles.
- No. 5825688 Sergeant Reginald John Buxton, The Suffolk Regiment.
- No. 3191133 Sergeant John Callachan, The Green Howards (Alexandra, Princess of Wales's Own Yorkshire Regiment).
- No. 7516652 Sergeant James Campbell, Royal Army Medical Corps.
- No. S/1677412 Sergeant Albert William Chapman, Royal Army Service Corps.
- No. 7918274 Sergeant Jack Charnock, Corps of Military Police.
- No. 7637406 Sergeant James Christie, Indian Army Ordnance Corps.
- No. 2331928 Sergeant Thomas Edward Chew, Royal Corps of Signals.
- No. 10536640 Staff Sergeant George Clark, Royal Army Ordnance Corps.
- No. 2378496 Corporal Henry Clarke, Royal Corps of Signals.
- No. 2338088 Lance-Corporal (acting) Albert Clegg, Royal Corps of Signals.
- No. 7634942 Staff-Sergeant Thomas Charles Cleveland, Royal Army Ordnance Corps.
- No. 7389739 Staff-Sergeant (acting) Leslie Clough, Royal Army Medical Corps.
- No. 6908311 Colour Sergeant Arthur Thomas Clowes, The Queen's Royal Regiment (West Surrey).
- No. W/115070 Staff Sergeant Eileen Collier, Auxiliary Territorial Service.
- No. 547262 Sergeant Edward Cook, The Warwickshire Yeomanry, Royal Armoured Corps.
- No. 7385915 Corporal Norman Howard Arthur Cooper, Royal Army Medical Corps.
- No. 10350207 Sergeant Richard Mervyn Cooper, Intelligence Corps.
- No. 2966628 Company Quartermaster Sergeant Thomas Coram, The Argyll and Sutherland Highlanders (Princess Louise's).
- No. 1914247 Sergeant Samuel Corner, Royal Engineers.
- No. 6297813 Sergeant Harold Jesse Cox, Corps of Military Police.
- No. L/SCA/4171 Sergeant W. E. Cozier, South Caribbean Force.
- No. 23621238 Signalman Frederick John Crome, Royal Corps of Signals.
- No. 1886275 Lance Sergeant (acting) Albert Crompton, Royal Engineers.
- No. NA/31 Regimental Sergeant Major (acting) Idi Damagaram, Royal West African Frontier Force.
- No. 115692 Sergeant Clifford Granville Daniels, Army Educational Corps.
- No. 4460996 Lance Sergeant (acting) David Davidson, The Durham Light Infantry.
- No. 7347563 Sergeant Douglas Randolph Stuart Dempster, Royal Army Medical Corps.
- No. T/19151 Corporal John Thomas Dix, Royal Army Service Corps.
- No. 1876957 Staff Sergeant Harold George Dixon, South Africa Medical Corps.
- No. 4274987 Company Quartermaster Sergeant John Allen Dixon, Royal Northumberland Fusiliers.
- No. 7630300 Staff Sergeant Frank Arthur Driver, Royal Army Ordnance Corps.
- No. 7387618 Sergeant Nigel Hugh Barrington Duncalfe, Royal Army Medical Corps.
- No. 7585541 Armament Staff Sergeant George Bruce Eastlake, Royal Electrical and Mechanical Engineers.
- No. 2128920 Bombardier John Sydney Edwards, Royal Artillery.
- No. 1991936 Sapper Rowland Horace Edwards, Royal Engineers.
- No. 2062496 Lance Sergeant (acting) Ernest Guy Ellis, Royal Engineers.
- No. 1410698 Band Sergeant Evan Robert Evans, Coldstream Guards.
- No. W/595169 Staff Sergeant Phyllis Lilian Farmer, Voluntary Aid Detachment.
- No. 10584662 Private Robert Walter Farmer, Royal Army Ordnance Corps.
- No. 421075 Sergeant Isaac Woolf Flach, Royal Corps of Signals.
- No. S/184897 Staff Sergeant John Alexander Forbes, Royal Army Service Corps.
- No. 109349 Artisan Staff Sergeant Ambrose Fox, Royal Electrical and Mechanical Engineers.
- No. W/64762 Lance Sergeant (acting) Josephine Irene Fox, Auxiliary Territorial Service.
- No. W/298150V Staff Sergeant (temporary) Estella May Frames, Women's Army Auxiliary Service, Union Defence Force.
- No. S/154707 Staff Sergeant (acting) Herbert Charles Francis, Royal Army Service Corps.
- No. 2313749 Company Quartermaster Sergeant James Heslon Francis, Royal Corps of Signals.
- No. 5054683 Sergeant Arthur Freeman, Royal Artillery.
- No. 2196711 Corporal Edward Douglas Frost, Royal Engineers.
- No. 7625585 Corporal Arthur Fryer, Royal Army Ordnance Corps.
- No. 2562608 Signalman Ralph Gavins, The Royal Corps of Signals.
- No. 24081 Warrant Officer Class II (acting) John William Gibson, DCM, The Green Howards (Alexandra, Princess of Wales's Own Yorkshire Regiment).
- No. 3778265 Sergeant James Gillespie, The King's Regiment (Liverpool).
- No. 2337408 Corporal Eric Gittings, The Royal Corps of Signals.
- No. D/1744 Colour Sergeant Robert Glennon, The Manchester Regiment.
- No. 7385509 Lance Sergeant (acting) Harold Henry Golding, Royal Army Medical Corps.
- No. S/189258 Sergeant Edward Gray, Royal Army Service Corps.
- No. 5670262 Staff Sergeant (acting) Frederick Gerald Gray, The Army Physical Training Corps.
- No. 830367 Sergeant Harold Dale Greaves, Royal Artillery.
- No, 5663062 Sergeant Ernest Green, The South Staffordshire Regiment.
- No. 220049 Corporal Robert Greensword, Royal Engineers.
- No. 7013013 Company Sergeant Major (acting) Francis John Hamilton, The Royal Ulster Rifles.
- No. 1903035 Sergeant Arthur Kenneth Hand, Royal Engineers.
- No. 764033 Sergeant Thomas Hankinson, Royal Artillery.
- No. 7536243 Staff Sergeant Albert Victor Harding, Army Dental Corps.
- No. 5826162 Sergeant Albert Harlock, The Suffolk Regiment.
- No. 2344032 Company Quartermaster Sergeant George Sidney Harris, Royal Corps of Signals.
- No. W/11451 Sergeant Joan Mary Harris, Auxiliary Territorial Service.
- No. 310689 Sergeant John Hatcher, The Royal Scots (The Royal Regiment).
- No. 10569673 Staff Sergeant Ernest Skipworth Heath, Royal Electrical and Mechanical Engineers.
- No. S/133800 Staff Quartermaster Sergeant (acting) Harold Helme, Royal Army Service Corps.
- No. 4619795 Colour Sergeant Eric Walter Herren, The Border Regiment.
- No. 7944847 Sergeant Norman William Heys, Indian Army Corps of Clerks.
- No. 7665935 Staff Sergeant Wilfred Hirst, Royal Army Pay Corps.
- No. 10537039 Staff Sergeant Walter Hoadley, Royal Electrical and Mechanical Engineers.
- No. 2654300 Sergeant Phillip Stanley Hobbs, Coldstream Guards.
- No. 5622405 Sergeant Ronald William Holmes, The Devonshire Regiment.
- No. 7358620 Sergeant Cecil Howett, Royal Army Medical Corps.
- No. 2322608 Lance Sergeant (acting) Frederick Howitt, The Royal Corps of Signals.
- No. 7635893 Sergeant (acting) Alfred Huggins, Royal Electrical and Mechanical Engineers.
- No. 7648533 Staff Sergeant Arthur Reginald Hurst, Royal Electrical and Mechanical Engineers.
- No. 351 Staff Sergeant Madge Violet Hussey, Auxiliary Territorial Service.
- No. 1450097 Battery Quartermaster Sergeant John Cecil Ironmonger, Royal Artillery.
- No. W/36598 Staff Sergeant Bridget Jackson, Auxiliary Territorial Service.
- No. 101476 Corporal Evelyn Jackson, Auxiliary Territorial Service.
- No. 6837719 Colour Sergeant George Jones, MM, The King's Royal Rifle Corps.
- No. 1991218 Staff Sergeant Harold Perry Jones, Royal Engineers.
- No. 19017 Sergeant Malile Kaingi, East Africa Signal Corps.
- No. NR/16368 Staff Sergeant Clerk Robert Kalimukwa, Northern Rhodesia Regiment.
- No. 4799959 Sergeant John William Keal, The Durham Light Infantry.
- No. 59406 Signalman Akbar Khan, Indian Signal Corps, Indian Army.
- No. W/144911 Staff Sergeant Joyce Winifred King, Auxiliary Territorial Service.
- No. 13102164 Sergeant Everard Kirby, Pioneer Corps.
- No. 7662811 Corporal Albert Edward Kirkham, Royal Engineers.
- No. 7883787 Lance Sergeant Andrew George Stephen Kirton, Royal Tank Regiment, Royal Armoured Corps.
- No. 1525539 Corporal Andrew Klinghardt, Intelligence Corps.
- No. 3600213 Private Thomas Lace, The Border Regiment.
- No. 10557778 Corporal George Lambert, Royal Army Ordnance Corps.
- No. 7636133 Staff Sergeant Norman Landells, Royal Army Ordnance Corps.
- No. 3596620 Sergeant Patrick Lavery, The Border Regiment.
- No. 7591827 Sergeant Frank Lee, Indian Electrical and Mechanical Engineers.
- No. W/18178 Sergeant Joan Littleton, Auxiliary Territorial Service.
- No. S/5739506 Sergeant Ernest London, Royal Army Service Corps.
- No. W/25167 Corporal Eileen Maisie Looker, Auxiliary Territorial Service.
- No. 704617 Sergeant Francis Verney Lote, Royal Artillery.
- No. 1897361 Sergeant Arthur Edward Lowe, Royal Engineers.
- No. 23877 Staff Sergeant (acting) Lillian Maud Mailer, Auxiliary Territorial Service.
- No. 11307 Clerk James Whiteford Mandah, Zombah Training Centre, East Africa Force.
- No. S/136475 Private Albert James Mannix, Royal Army Service Corps.
- No. 2605902 Company Sergeant Major (acting) William Thomas Marlow, Corps of Military Police.
- No. 5616969 Colour Sergeant Ronald Kenneth Martin, The Devonshire Regiment.
- No. 7873431 Staff Sergeant William Matthews, Royal Armoured Corps.
- No. 4384050 Colour Sergeant Horace Harman Henry McGaw, The Sherwood Foresters (Nottinghamshire & Derbyshire Regiment).
- No. 1458634 Gunner Alexander McGeoch, Royal Artillery.
- No. 2045297 Corporal Robert Marshal McKeown, Royal Engineers.
- No. 2310583 Company Quartermaster Sergeant Albert John Mears, Royal Engineers.
- Sergeant Salim Menizel, Transjordan Frontier Force.
- No. 1699131 Staff Sergeant Cyril William Mills, Royal Artillery.
- No. 4390809 Sergeant Anthony Milner, The Green Howards (Alexandra, Princess of Wales's Own Yorkshire Regiment).
- No. V.2208 Dafadar Faqir Mohd, Indian Army Veterinary Corps.
- No. 14713439 Private John Leslie Morgan, Royal Army Medical Corps.
- No. 1869218 Staff Sergeant Charles Robert Morley, Royal Engineers.
- No. 14280356 Sergeant Bernard Claude Moore, Pioneer Corps.
- No. 7537028 Sergeant Gordon Bruce Morris, Army Dental Corps.
- No. L/SCA/1170 Staff Sergeant H. Murray, South Caribbean Area Medical Corps.
- No. 10572536 Sergeant George William Newman, Royal Army Ordnance Corps.
- No. 21272 Havildar Clerk Bartholomew Robert Newton, Indian Artillery.
- No. W/27600 Staff Sergeant Elsie Irene Noyce, Auxiliary Territorial Service.
- No. W/13952 Sergeant Ivy Doris Oakley, Auxiliary Territorial Service.
- No. S/6191585 Sergeant Thomas Jesse Oram, Royal Army Service Corps.
- No. 7612111 Staff Sergeant William Hamer Orchard, Royal Electrical and Mechanical Engineers.
- No. 4034627 Staff Sergeant Instructor William Brian Ozzard, Army Physical Training Corps.
- No. 13049232 Sergeant George Robert Padmore, Pioneer Corps.
- No. T/1333527 Corporal Cyril Frederick James Park, Royal Army Service Corps.
- No. 14279528 Staff Sergeant Frank Reginald Parris, Royal Engineers.
- No. D/8215 Company Quartermaster Sergeant Benjamin James Peacham, The Queen's Royal Regiment (West Surrey).
- No. 14546125 Corporal Harry Pearson, Royal Electrical and Mechanical Engineers.
- No. S/12283 Staff Sergeant Frederick Edward Henry Pells, Royal Army Service Corps.
- No. W/PAL/195151 Sergeant Marianna Penn, Auxiliary Territorial Service.
- No. 14603352 Sapper Richard d'Arcy Phillips, Royal Engineers.
- No. T/164850 Lance Sergeant Victor Pinnock, Royal Army Service Corps.
- No. 10350674 Sergeant Frank Cecil Pluck, Intelligence Corps.
- No. 2088680 Sergeant Louis Charles Pocock, Royal Artillery.
- No. 299198 Lance Sergeant Frederick William Pomroy, Army Catering Corps.
- No. 854565 Sergeant Montague Frank Pratt, Royal Artillery.
- No. 982260 Sergeant Thomas William Regan, Intelligence Corps.
- No. 3132483 Sergeant (acting) Duncan Hutchinson Reive, Royal Engineers.
- No. 3457418 Corporal Hedley Roberts, The Lancashire Fusiliers.
- No. 1764760 Sergeant James Robinson, Intelligence Corps.
- No. Pal/12722 Corporal Itzchak Rooz, Royal Engineers.
- No. 3772694 Staff Sergeant Albert James Sands, Royal Electrical and Mechanical Engineers.
- No. 1549969 Sergeant John Dodd Scott, Royal Artillery.
- No. W/95214 Private Margaret Shepherd, Auxiliary Territorial Service.
- No. W/545438 Sergeant Eileen Dorothea Simpson, Voluntary Aid Detachment.
- No. T/199132 Private Horace Simpson, Royal Army Service Corps.
- No. 7690971 Lance-Corporal James Simpson, Corps of Military Police.
- No. 12940 Havildar Parbhati Singh, 19th Hyderabad Regiment, Indian Army.
- No. 7255857 Private William George Sivell, Royal Army Service Corps.
- No. 2989270 Sergeant (acting) Edgar Slater, Royal Engineers.
- No. 7594520 Staff Sergeant George Edward Smalley, Royal Army Ordnance Corps.
- No. 2032493 Company Sergeant-Major (acting) William Albert Smart, Royal Engineers.
- No. 6282670 Sergeant George Albert Smith, Corps of Military Police.
- No. 1447378 Sergeant Horace Leonard Smith, Royal Artillery.
- No. 1896385 Sergeant John Smith, Royal Engineers.
- No. 3708006 Sergeant James Charles Smith, Royal Armoured Corps.
- No. 3780720 Company Quartermaster-Sergeant William Arthur John Smith, The King's Regiment (Liverpool).
- No. 6455815 Sergeant William Edward Smith, Royal Artillery.
- No. 2319145 Sergeant Michael Pearson Snowball, Royal Corps of Signals.
- No. 7639246 Sergeant (acting) Reginald Percy Speed, Royal Army Ordnance Corps.
- No. W/29165 Corporal Dorothy Winifred Steel, Auxiliary Territorial Service.
- No. 16001297 Sergeant Henry Michael Stewart, Royal Electrical and Mechanical Engineers.
- No. 2869550 Sergeant Peter Stewart, Army Catering Corps.
- No. 1924427 Warrant Officer Class I (acting) Wentworth George Stokes, Royal Engineers.
- No. 3601195 Sergeant Frederick Stout, The Border Regiment.
- No. 1464015 Staff Sergeant Lester Stringer, Royal Artillery.
- No. 134763 Sergeant Irene Margaret Strong, Auxiliary Territorial Service.
- No. 1882240 Sergeant Charles Robert Suckling, Royal Engineers.
- No. 813184 Sergeant William Edward Frederick Suckling, Royal Engineers.
- No. 33772 Sergeant Clare Irene Sullivan, Auxiliary Territorial Service.
- No. 5989361 Sergeant William John Sweet, Army Catering Corps.
- No. W/67353 Private Joan Tarzey, Auxiliary Territorial Service.
- No. 2344719 Sergeant. Leslie William Taylor, Royal Corps of Signals.
- No. 800997 Battery Quartermaster-Sergeant Wilfred James Thomas, Royal Artillery.
- No. T/114348 Private Jack Francis Tristram, Royal Army Service Corps.
- No. 7536424 Staff Sergeant Stephen Urquhart, Army Dental Corps.
- No. 7810834 Sergeant William Percy Vinall, The Royal Sussex Regiment.
- No. 6979937 Staff Sergeant Owen Thomas Vincent, Royal Army Pay Corps.
- No. S/154356 Staff Quartermaster-Sergeant (acting) John Henry Violen, Royal Army Service Corps.
- No. 1587935 Bombardier Leslie Alfred Wagstaffe, Royal Artillery.
- No. 1073068 Sergeant Instructor Wilfred James Dyer Walford, Army Physical Training Corps.
- No. T/187839 Sergeant George William Walker, Royal Army Service Corps.
- No. 257331 Private Patricia Ann Walsh, Auxiliary Territorial Service.
- No. 2116376 Corporal Ernest Ward, Royal Engineers.
- No. 549983 Staff Quartermaster-Sergeant Gerald Arthur Wearing, The Warwickshire Yeomanry, Royal Armoured Corps.
- No. 2339772 Company Quartermaster-Sergeant John Bernard Wells, Royal Corps of Signals.
- No. 1630583 Staff Sergeant (acting) Frank Wenz, Royal Engineers.
- No. S/6021062 Sergeant Sidney Whalan, Royal Army Service Corps.
- No. 4862376 Sergeant Albert Ronald Wheelhouse, The Dorsetshire Regiment.
- No. 5329470 Sergeant Albert Edward White, Army Catering Corps.
- No. S/10664069 Corporal William Howard Williams, Royal Army Service Corps.
- No. 15855 Sergeant (acting) Doris May Christina Wilson, Auxiliary Territorial Service.
- No. 1869253 Mechanist Staff Sergeant John Edgar Wilson, Royal Engineers.
- No. S/2934096 Staff Quartermaster-Sergeant (acting) Edward Henry Wilton, Royal Army Service Corps.
- No. 3454755 Sapper Samuel Wood, Royal Engineers.
- No. 2134983 Corporal (acting) Arthur Hudson Yeomans, Royal Engineers.
- No. 389601 Staff Sergeant John Young, Army Catering Corps.
- No. VX.25148 Warrant Officer Class II (acting) Francis James Mather, Australian Military Forces.

Royal Air Force

- 524788 Flight Sergeant John Henry Adcock.
- 568998 Flight Sergeant Edward Ernest Alder.
- 568488 Flight Sergeant Keith Sidney Andrews.
- 801194 Flight Sergeant Ralph William Apps, AAF.
- 560079 Flight Sergeant Samuel James Aston.
- 370766 Flight Sergeant Ronald Bainbridge.
- 565844 Flight Sergeant Edward Balkwill.
- 103446 Flight Sergeant Walter Bond, RAFVR.
- 915090 Flight Sergeant Sidney James Bone, RAFVR.
- 916560 Flight Sergeant Norman Cecil Brandon, RAFVR.
- 1143460 Flight Sergeant Harry Broadhead, RAFVR.
- 349541 Flight Sergeant George Edward Brown.
- 561493 Flight Sergeant George Valentine Carne.
- 813020 Flight Sergeant Reginald John Chapman, AAF.
- 212333V Flight Sergeant Frank Lester Cizek, SAAF.
- 1253068 Flight Sergeant Ernest Albert Clarke, RAFVR.
- 563116 Flight Sergeant Albert Henry Ferguson.
- 366279 Flight Sergeant Edward Henry Jack Fevre.
- 570330 Flight Sergeant Arthur Ernest Field.
- 984080 Flight Sergeant Phildip Florence, RAFVR.
- 563325 Flight Sergeant David Raymond Francis.
- 617356 Flight Sergeant John Oliver Gillingham.
- Aus.3510 Flight Sergeant Wilfred Bert Grainger, RAAF (now Warrant Officer).
- 563643 Flight Sergeant David William Griffiths.
- 564205 Flight Sergeant Leslie Reginald Grover.
- 64566 Flight Sergeant Sidney Guy Hanneford.
- 1547050 Flight Sergeant John Hansbury, RAFVR.
- 563155 Flight Sergeant Walter Harris.
- 200790 Flight Sergeant Reginald Hartles.
- 365855 Flight Sergeant Arthur Vincent Hill.
- 564692 Flight Sergeant Bertram Waiter Hill.
- 524820 Flight Sergeant Arthur Walter Hogben.
- 523891 Flight Sergeant George Albert Hopgood.
- 560244 Flight Sergeant Donald Innes Hoskins.
- 1278596 Flight Sergeant Dewi Emlyn Jones, RAFVR.
- 526706 Flight Sergeant Hubert Wadlace Last.
- 569594 Flight Sergeant William Joseph Lemar.
- 810033 Flight Sergeant Reginald Ernest Lewis, AAF.
- 528129 Flight Sergeant Reginald Ernest Lipscombe.
- 803314 Flight Sergeant John Mann, AAF.
- 519629 Flight Sergeant Eric Mansell.
- 570798 Flight Sergeant Douglas Arthur Reginald Naylor.
- 561838 Flight Sergeant John Ernest Nield.
- 564926 Flight Sergeant Frank William Daubney Nunn.
- 401584 Flight Sergeant Geoffrey Palmer.
- 506490 Flight Sergeant Henson Pegg.
- 1404813 Flight Sergeant John Phillips, RAFVR.
- 564372 Flight Sergeant Frank James Pryor.
- 564370 Flight Sergeant Ivor John Charles Radley.
- 620274 Flight Sergeant William Reidy.
- 244939 Flight Sergeant Cecil Edward Rhodes.
- 562602 Flight Sergeant George Williams Rowlett.
- 565135 Flight Sergeant Ernest Albert Satterley.
- 633610 Flight Sergeant Leonard George Scott.
- 521036 Flight Sergeant Norman Howard Seyde.
- 509976 Flight Sergeant Francis Edward Sibley.
- Can/R.52977 Flight Sergeant Gordon Snape, RCAF.
- Aus.5738 Flight Sergeant Jack McGregor Stacey, RAAF.
- 567179 Flight Sergeant Edward John Staley.
- Can/R.81512 Flight Sergeant George Sullivan, RCAF.
- 346106 Flight Sergeant Lawrence Vincent.
- Can/R.85000 Flight Sergeant William Archibald West, RCAF.
- 362626 Flight Sergeant Frederick Wheate.
- 750159 Flight Sergeant Fred Whitworth, RAFVR.
- 539909 Flight Sergeant William Young.
- 643120 Acting Flight Sergeant Eric Vernon Allen.
- 567232 Acting Flight Sergeant Sidney Albert Baylis.
- 909441 Acting Flight Sergeant Harry Benford, RAFVR.
- 505143 Acting Flight Sergeant Widliam Henry Dawe.
- 1293950 Acting Flight Sergeant Charles Francis George Defer, RAFVR.
- 523127 Acting Flight Sergeant Douglas George Higgs.
- 1353765 Acting Flight Sergeant Ronald James Hurrion, RAFVR.
- 1356618 Acting Flight Sergeant John Price Jones, RAFVR.
- 516855 Acting-Flight Sergeant Edgar Mason.
- 347758 Acting Flight Sergeant Frederick William Monington.
- 570026 Acting Flight Sergeant George Henry Paxton.
- 1307858 Acting Flight Sergeant Frederick Thomas Poulton, RAFVR.
- 572263 Acting Flight Sergeant George Henry Simpson.
- 563743 Acting Flight Sergeant George Thomas Joseph Waite.
- 411446 Acting Flight Sergeant Clement Wastie.
- Can/2668 Acting Flight Sergeant Barney Wilson, RCAF.
- 1423280 Sergeant Ronald Harris Abbott, RAFVR.
- 1250394 Sergeant Cyril Francis Ralph Alder, RAFVR.
- 943364 Sergeant John Alfred Askew, RAFVR.
- 1241248 Sergeant Cyril William Avis, RAFVR.
- 1625643 Sergeant Kenton Victor Badger, RAFVR.
- 332176 Sergeant James Alfred Bailey.
- 761160 Sergeant Daniel Barry, RAFVR.
- 999424 Sergeant Harry Frederick Beilby, RAFVR.
- Can/R.96097 Sergeant Harvey Bickerton, RCAF.
- 639929 Sergeant Gilbert Elworthy Bolt.
- 994764 Sergeant Howard Wesley Bowes, RAFVR.
- 616830 Sergeant Alexander Forsyth Campbell.
- 528882 Sergeant Vere Clark.
- 1006854 Sergeant Leslie William Garland Coates, RAFVR.
- 906753 Sergeant William Raymond Denley, RAFVR.
- 1203802 Sergeant Jack Dobson, RAFVR.
- 967203 Sergeant John McInnes Duncan, RAFVR.
- Can/R.71235 Sergeant Robert Alexander Edward, RCAF.
- 970344 Sergeant John Ceredig Evans, RAFVR.
- 970741 Sergeant Albert Conroy Farrar, RAFVR.
- 522360 Sergeant Leslie Stewart Fletcher.
- 269145 Sergeant Ernest John Ganden.
- 1419185 Sergeant Ralph Anthony Bridge Gee, RAFVR.
- 1431727 Sergeant William John Grey, RAFVR.
- 534766 Sergeant John William Kenneth Gritton.
- 1188655 Sergeant Herbert Frederick John Hart, RAFVR.
- 752644 Sergeant Sidney Edward Hemming, RAFVR.
- 922887 Sergeant Alfred Percy Hogarth, RAFVR.
- 1261735 Sergeant Elwyn David Jones, RAFVR.
- 553036 Sergeant George Rowland Jones.
- 619733 Sergeant Thomas Leader.
- 961064 Sergeant Edwin Henry Mardon, RAFVR.
- 1209418 Sergeant John Ernest Edward Mason, RAFVR.
- 912830 Sergeant John Reginald Michell, RAFVR.
- 930265 Sergeant Leonard David Morris, RAFVR.
- 966093 Sergeant John Ronald Morton, RAFVR.
- 570008 Sergeant Ian Alan Neilson.
- 900096 Sergeant Douglas William Spooner, RAFVR.
- 1212205 Sergeant John Llewellyn Swan, RAFVR.
- 1383502 Sergeant Ernest William Thomas, RAFVR.
- 1378005 Sergeant George Bertram Thomas, RAFVR.
- 905778 Sergeant Denis Stanley Upstone, RAFVR.
- 527312 Sergeant Leslie George Vince.
- 1075644 Sergeant George Llewellyn Ward, RAFVR.
- 756220 Sergeant Cyril Sydney West, RAFVR.
- 523751 Sergeant William James Wheal.
- 1360736 Sergeant Robert John Williams, RAFVR.
- 628758 Sergeant Sidney James Worsfold.
- 1170082 Sergeant Kenneth Thomas Wyllie, RAFVR.
- 919119 Acting Sergeant Raymond Percy Bench, RAFVR.
- 313955V Acting Sergeant Clement Walter Gibson, SAAF.
- 913006 Corporal Raymond Lewis Cleave, RAFVR.
- 986412 Corporal Philip Terence Crampton, RAFVR.
- 1304035 Corporal James Fogg, RAFVR.
- 543600 Corporal Robert Foley.
- 642783 Corporal John Alexander Gilliard.
- 958124 Corporal Norman Charles Harris, RAFVR.
- 626568 Corporal Richard Herbert.
- Can/R.154429 Corporal Ernest Harold Kassie, RCAF.
- 1517322 Corporal Christopher Robert Miskin, RAFVR.
- 1260428 Corporal Harry Leslie Palmer, RAFVR.
- 1197398 Corporal Frederick John Redding, RAFVR.
- 1149851 Corporal Arthur Kenneth Thornhill, RAFVR.
- 1156053 Corporal Cyril Frederick Westwick, RAFVR.
- Can/R.162616 Leading Aircraftman Howard Parfitt, RCAF.
- 1249203 Leading Aircraftman Stanley Joseph Pitt, RAFVR.
- 909732 Leading Aircraftman Clarence John Wicks, RAFVR.
- 1234204 Leading Aircraftman Frank Ernest Wilson, RAFVR.
- 421411 Flight Sergeant Kathleen Downe, WAAF.
- 892270 Flight Sergeant Margery Lorna Hessom, WAAF.
- 447500 Sergeant Mary Bayliss, WAAF.
- 2001540 Corporal Mary Blake, WAAF.
- 423824 Corporal Elsie Margaret Mawson, WAAF.
- 2136431 Leading Aircraftwoman Ivy Cross, WAAF.
- Flight Sergeant George Andrew Edmond, RNZAF.
- Flight Sergeant Eric George McEwen, RNZAF.
- Flight Sergeant Arthur Jack Smaill, RNZAF.

Civil Division
India

- Sri Subramania Ayyar Rajagopala Ayyar, Manager, Office of the Registrar of Cooperative Societies, Madras.
- Sri Timiri Krishnaswami Mudaliar, Lately Acting Sub-Assistant Registrar, High Court, Madras.
- Ramchandra Ganpatrao Shinde, Mamlatdar of Popargaon, Ahmednagar District, Bombay.
- Alibhai Mahomed Pat-El, Mamlatdar of Jambusar, Broach District, Bombay.
- Wahaj-Ul-Haq, Labour Officer, and lately Tahsildar, Gorakhpur, United Provinces.
- Lala Rangi Lal, Engineer, District Board, Unao, United Provinces.
- Syed Nasirul Hasan Zaidi, Tahsildar, Unao, United Provinces
- Babu Prasannahari Das Gupta, Head Clerk, 3rd Battalion Assam Rifles, S.E.A.C. Assam.
- Namkiabuing Zemi Naga, Chief Scout, North Cachar Hills Watch and Ward, Village Impoi, Haflong, Assam.
- Sri Puma Chandra Mahanty, Organizer of Village Guards, Cuttack, Orissa.
- Khitish Chandra Roy, Assistant Foreman, Inspectorate of Guns, Cossipore, Bengal.
- Ganapathi Subbiyer Subramaniam, Civilian Clerk, Madras Guards, Auxiliary Force, India.
- Joseph D'Cruze, Assistant Foreman, Cordite Factory, Aruvankadu.
- Dorabji Ardeshir, Electrical Chargeman, Mazagon Dock Ltd., Bombay.
- Conrad Walker, Supervising Station Master, Bengal & Assam Railway, Chittagong.
- Noel Jalejer Nowrojee, Driver, Bengal & Assam Railway, Chitpur.
- William Major Tearle, Temporary Assistant Traffic Superintendent (Liaison Officer), Cochin Harbour Terminus, South Indian Railway.
- Thomas Henry McManus, Yard Foreman, Great Indian Peninsular Railway, Dehu Road.
- Rowshan Din, Driver, North-Western Railway, Delhi Division.

Burma

- Zinghtung Nawag, Taungok Tanghpre, Myitkyina Subdivision, Myitkyina District.

Colonial Empire

- Florence Mabel Ducker, Lately Telephone Operator, Crown Agents for the Colonies.
- Kima Jack Pedro, Constructional Carpenter, Gilbert and Ellice Islands.
- Ernest Thompson, Foreman of Works Railways, Gold Coast.
- Abdulla, son of Kotea, Theatre Attendant, Medical Department, Kenya.
- Mohammed Abdallah, Locomotive driver, Palestine Railways.
- Shams ed-Din Ahmad, Locomotive driver, Palestine Railways.
- Ayad Ghall, Postal Clerk, Department of Posts & Telegraphs, Palestine.
- Adel Hammad, Clerk, Public Works Department, Palestine.
- Mikhail Rossides, Locomotive driver, Palestine Railways.
- Kingston Antoninus King, Chief Dispenser, Medical Department, Sierra Leone.
- Ngatu, Hereditary Chief and Government Headman of North Marovo people.

=== Imperial Service Medal ===
- Pandit Chiranji Lai Bhat, Head Constable, I Grade, Aligarh, United Provinces.
- Kotwal Narayanappa Bheema, Postman, Chitaldroog, Mysore State.
- Chand Khan, Head Constable, Central Provinces and Berar.
- Didari Ram, Jamadar Chaprassi, Punjab Irrigation Branch Secretariat, Punjab.
- Eknath Sakaram, Telegraph Mistry, Posts & Telegraphs, Sind and Baluchistan Circle.
- Anthony Francis, Head Constable, Central Provinces and Berar.
- Sakharam Jivaji, Bombay District Police, Brevet Jamadar (II Grade Head Constable), Bombay, Baroda and Central India Railway, Bombay.
- Ahmed Umrao Kazi, Bombay District Police, I Grade Head Constable, Kaira District, Bombay.
- Pars Ram, Peon, Lower Chenab East Circle, Irrigation Branch, Punjab.

=== Distinguished Service Order (DSO) ===
Royal Navy

- Captain James Parrington Gornall.
- Acting Captain Kenneth Stewart Colquhoun.

=== Distinguished Service Cross (DSC) ===
Royal Navy

- Commander Talbot Leadam Eddison (Haywards Heath).
- Commander Dermod James Boris Jewitt.
- Commander Sidney Neville Smith (Retd.).
- Commander James Lunnon, RD, RNR (Retd.) (Plymouth).
- Commander Ernest Bernard Sandon, RD, RNR (Liverpool).
- Acting Commander Thomas Kirkpatrick Masterman (Marlborough).
- Acting Commander William Mills Mulhall, RD, RNR (Weymouth).
- Commander (E) Kenneth Joseph Robb Langmaid (Trusham, Devon).
- Commander (E) Alfred Godfrey Blake Norman (Chatham).
- Temporary Commander (E) Oliver John Rolfe Pinkney, RNR (Scarisbrick, Lanes).
- Temporary Commander (E) Hector Norman Weir, RNR (Dawlish).
- Lieutenant-Commander John William Huyshe Bennett (Exmouth).
- Lieutenant-Commander Bryan Cecil Durant (Hambledon).
- Lieutenant-Commander David Josceline Algernon Heber-Percy.
- Acting Lieutenant-Commander James Woore Cortlandt-Simpson (Retd.).
- Temporary Lieutenant-Commander Harry Alves Inglis, RNR.
- Acting Temporary Lieutenant-Commander John Ewan Cameron, RNR (Glasgow).
- Acting Temporary Lieutenant-Commander Byron Albert Caws, RNR (Grimsby).
- Temporary Acting Lieutenant-Commander Samuel Arthur Jarvis, RNR (Gosport).
- Acting Lieutenant-Commander Philip Almond Read, RNR (Gosforth).
- Acting Temporary Lieutenant-Commander Ernest Searle, RNR (Bournemouth).
- Acting Temporary Lieutenant-Commander Basil Laurence Bourne, RNVR (Reigate).
- Temporary Acting Lieutenant-Commander Gordon Bevington Jones, RNVR (Southsea).
- Acting Temporary Lieutenant-Commander Wilfred Layland, RNVR (Rawdon, near Leeds).
- Temporary Acting Lieutenant-Commander John Ivester Lloyd, RNVR (Leighton Buzzard).
- Temporary Acting Lieutenant-Commander Ronald George Middleton, RNVR (Croydon).
- Temporary Acting Lieutenant-Commander Adam Nicholson Robertson, RNVR (Isle of Cambrae, Scotland).
- Temporary Acting Lieutenant-Commander Edward Eastaway Thomas, RNVR (Surbiton).
- Temporary Acting Lieutenant-Commander Frank Sydney Burnet Appleton, RANVR.
- Acting Temporary Lieutenant-Commander William Edward Harrison, RCNR (Halifax, Nova Scotia).
- Temporary Acting Lieutenant-Commander Alfred Stapledon Miller, RNZNVR (Christchurch, New Zealand).
- Temporary Lieutenant-Commander Harry Mannix Nees, RNZNVR (Dunedin, New Zealand).
- Temporary Acting Lieutenant-Commander (A) Kenneth Philip Chapman, RNVR (London).
- Temporary Acting Lieutenant-Commander (E) Paul Norman Wilson (Kendal).
- Temporary Acting Lieutenant-Commander (E) Alexander Gordon, RNR (Glasgow).
- The Reverend Martin Martin-Harvey, Temporary Chaplain, RNVR (Bickley).
- Lieutenant David Reginald Forster (Keswick).
- Lieutenant William Charles Jelley (Bournemouth).
- Lieutenant Arthur Thomas Trim (Ilminster).
- Lieutenant Vaughan Alec Desire Turner.
- Lieutenant John Stafford Hough, RNR (Dovercourt).
- Lieutenant Roy McEwen Sinclair, RNR (Edinburgh).
- Temporary Lieutenant Ernest Reginald Waller, RNR (Cardiff).
- Temporary Lieutenant Harold Edward Bailey, RNVR
- Temporary Lieutenant James Eric Bennett, RNVR (Bramhall).
- Temporary Lieutenant John Eveleigh Bolton, RNVR (Wolverhampton).
- Temporary Lieutenant Gilbert Charles Price Boulton, RNVR (Hove).
- Temporary Lieutenant Herbert William Ridley Bryan, RNVR (Kenton).
- Temporary Lieutenant Brian Charles Coleman, RNVR (Newhaven).
- Temporary Lieutenant Gordon Edric Collins, RNVR (London).
- Temporary Lieutenant Thomas Garrett Dawson, RNVR
- Temporary Lieutenant Archibald George Hawkes, RNVR (Peckham).
- Temporary Lieutenant David Thomas Hewlett, RNVR (Petswood).
- Temporary Lieutenant John Douglas Hibberd, RNVR (Aldershot).
- Temporary Lieutenant Kenneth Hodson, RNVR (Catford).
- Temporary Lieutenant Horatio Sidney Lee, RNVR (Wembley).
- Temporary Lieutenant George Pringle Millar, RNVR (Edinburgh).
- Temporary Lieutenant Colin Ernest Polden, RNVR (Dublin).
- Temporary Lieutenant Norman Arthur Ray, RNVR (Burnham-on-Crouch).
- Temporary Lieutenant Joseph Anthony Reeves, RNVR (Brighton).
- Temporary Lieutenant Michael Serraillier, RNVR
- Temporary Lieutenant Norman Smale, RNVR (Alderton, Suffolk).
- Temporary Lieutenant Neil Williain Gilchrist Taylor, RNVR (Glasgow).
- Temporary Lieutenant Francis Donald Tindley, RNVR (Beckenham).
- Temporary Lieutenant Douglas Harold Titcombe, RNVR (Weymouth).
- Temporary Lieutenant Eric Edwin James Whife, RNVR (Scunthorpe).
- Temporary Lieutenant Alec Francis Wilkinson, RNVR
- Temporary Lieutenant Charles Paul Willis, RNVR (Upper Norwood).
- Temporary Lieutenant John Oliver Wright, RNVR (Birmingham).
- Temporary Lieutenant Robert Stewart Wylie, RNVR (Hull).
- Temporary Acting Lieutenant John Chalmers Mackenzie, RNVR (Edinburgh).
- Temporary Lieutenant Ian Bryce Chenoweth, RCNVR (Montreal).
- Temporary Lieutenant Robert Alexander Logan, RNZNVR (Auckland, New Zealand).
- Temporary Lieutenant Robert Campbell Pearson, RNZNVR.
- Temporary Lieutenant (A) Robert Christian Mathe, RNVR (London, N.W.3).
- Temporary Lieutenant (A) Patrick John Mortimer Canter, RNZNVR (Auckland, New Zealand).
- Temporary Lieutenant (A) Allan Ronald Duff, RNZVR (South Dunedin, New Zealand).
- Temporary Lieutenant (E) John Christopher Thorne (Maidstone).
- Acting Lieutenant (E) Edgar Jack Johnston (Rainham).
- Temporary Lieutenant (E) Roderick John Noble Asher, RNR (Glasgow).
- Temporary Lieutenant (E) Hugh Alexander Leslie, RNR (Belfast).
- Temporary Lieutenant (E) Charles Edmund Stanger, RNR (Paisley).
- Temporary Lieutenant (E) John Richard Bottomley, RNVR (Great Yarmouth).
- Temporary Lieutenant (S) George James Cotton Hambling, RNVR (Clapham).
- Temporary Lieutenant (S) Owen George Jenkins, RNVR (Cosham).
- Temporary Lieutenant (S) Horace William Frank Johnson, RNVR (Lymington).
- Temporary Lieutenant (S) John Moore, RNVR (Brighton).
- Captain Colin Ramsay Julius Scott, Royal Marines (Liverpool).
- Acting Temporary Skipper Lieutenant Joseph William Greene, RNR. T.S.288 (Fleetwood).
- Acting Chief Skipper William Bruce, RNR. T.S.427 (Burghead, Morayshire).
- Acting Temporary Chief Skipper George Henry Davies, RNR. T.S.666 (Hull).
- Acting Temporary Chief Skipper George Henry Kersey, RNR. T.S.179.
- Temporary Skipper Graham Edward John Muirhead, RNR. T.S.1572 (Cardiff).
- Temporary Sub-Lieutenant John Carmel Vincent Bagnall, RNVR (Manchester).
- Temporary Sub-Lieutenant John Robert McCluskie, RNVR (Greenford, Middlesex).
- Temporary Sub-Lieutenant William McLeod Stevenson, RNVR (London).
- Mr. Harry Thomas Bridle, Temporary Gunner (T) (Belfast).
- Mr. Marcus Ronald Edwards, DSM, Temporary Gunner (T) RN (Newcastle, Staffs).
- Mr. Ronald James Gordon Stagey, Commissioned Engineer (Portsmouth).
- Mr. Cyril Ernest Prosser, Warrant Engineer (Plymouth).
- Mr. Frank Neville White, Warrant Engineer (Maidstone).
- Mr. Clement George Tiller, Temporary Warrant Telegraphist, RAN (Victoria, New South Wales).
- Mr. Frederick William Charles Hall, Warrant Mechanician (Porchester).

==== Bar to the Distinguished Service Cross ====
Royal Navy

- Acting Temporary Lieutenant-Commander George Clifford Fanner, DSC, RNVR.
- Acting Lieutenant-Commander (E) Frederick Charles William Lawson, DSC (Eastbourne).
- Acting Lieutenant (E) Alexander Charles Grant, DSC (South Queensferry).

=== Distinguished Service Medal (DSM) ===
- Chief Petty Officer Frederick Walter Atkins, C/JX.127091 (Brockley, S.W.4).
- Chief Petty Officer Harold Frederick Bonsall, C/J.72607 (Worthing).
- Chief Petty Officer (Gunner's Mate) Idris Bowen, D/J. 107830 (Mold).
- Chief Petty Officer Patrick Joseph Cahill, D/J.23946 (Kirkaldy).
- Chief Petty Officer James Kay Crotty, R.C.N.2242 (Ingersoll, Ontario).
- Chief Petty Officer Edward Barwell Foster, C/J.110040 (Weymouth).
- Chief Petty Officer Samuel James Alexander Hart, D/J.90132 (Glasgow).
- Chief Petty Officer George Albert Kitcher, P/JX.130802 (Gosport).
- Chief Petty Officer Ernest Mantle, D/J.99820 (Devonport).
- Chief Petty Officer Torpedo Coxswain Francis Edward Gary Peaker, C/JX.130341 (Clifton).
- Chief Petty Officer George Vanderhaegen, R.C.N.3154 (Yorkton, Sask.).
- Temporary Chief Petty Officer Hubert George Corben Brice, D/J.109230 (Yeovil).
- Acting Chief Petty Officer Andrew Black Wood, C/JX.126242 (South Shields).
- Master-at-Arms Frederick Davey, C/M.39708 (Rainham).
- Temporary Master-at-Arms Thomas Reuben Oliver, D/M.40200 (Plymouth).
- Chief Yeoman of Signals Walter William Knight, P/JX.159870 (Portsmouth).
- Chief Yeoman of Signals Stephen Frederick Nicholls, D/JX.128699 (Devonport).
- Chief Yeoman of Signals Alfred William John Wareham, D/J.70307 (Penzance).
- Chief Yeoman of Signals Arthur Weston, D/J.97337 (Plymouth).
- Temporary Chief Yeoman of Signals Robert Lionel Webb, C/JX.132708 (London).
- Chief Petty Officer Telegraphist James Edward Aldridge, C/J.64487 (Sherston).
- Chief Petty Officer Telegraphist Walter Edward Bourn, C/JX.137952 (Wingham, Canterbury).
- Chief Petty Officer Telegraphist Arthur Walter Coleman, P/J.75145 (Catherington).
- Chief Petty Officer Telegraphist Herbert Bradley Fawcett, D/J.42285 (Bradford).
- Chief Engine Room Artificer John Danby Marris Coe, C/MX.47304.
- Chief Engine Room Artificer John Hooper, D/MX.49130 (Tavistock).
- Chief Engine Room Artificer Richard Lawrence McGlade, D/MX.54536 (Middlesbrough).
- Chief Engine Room Artificer Edward Maugham, P/MX.51033.
- Chief Engine Room Artificer William Charles Prosser, D/M.28736 (Plymouth).
- Chief Engine Room Artificer John Thomas Ridley, C/MX.49887 (Lincoln).
- Chief Engine Room Artificer 1st Class George William Smith, P/X.981 E.B (Paisley).
- Chief Engine Room Artificer Warren McCandless Wright, P/MX.46965 (Marsh Seaton, Northumberland).
- Engine Room Artificer 1st Class Robert Makepeace Bains, D/X.922 E.B (Newcastle upon Tyne).
- Engine Room Artificer 2nd Class Wilson Boothman, D/MX.51951 (Stonehaven).
- Engine Room Artificer 3rd Class Douglas Elmer Balcom, RCNR, A.1613 (Dartmouth, N.S.).
- Engine Room Artificer 3rd Class John Robert William Bryant, C/MX.73457 (Weymouth).
- Engine Room Artificer 3rd Class Reginald James Croney, C/SMX.399.
- Chief Electrical Artificer John Finlay Mackenzie, P/MX.54905 (Wisbech).
- Chief Electrical Artificer Dennis Charles Naunton, C/M.38860 (Gillingham).
- Chief Electrical Artificer Norman Wilson, P/MX.54523 (Potters Bar).
- Electrical Artificer 1st Class William Roger Price, D/MX.45088 (Plymouth).
- Chief Mechanician George Arthur Waters, C/K.55306 (Maidstone).
- Chief Mechanician Albert John Wiltshire, P/KX.77670 (Haywards Heath).
- Mechanician 1st Class John Peters Norton, D/KX.82424 (Plymouth).
- Chief Stoker Robert Burridge, P/K.64747 (Gosport).
- Chief Stoker Arthur Driver, C/K.63146 (Rochester).
- Chief Stoker Samuel Haigh, R.C.N.21231.
- Chief Stoker George Jane, P/K.65397 (Boldon Colliery, Durham).
- Chief Stoker Albert Lewis Francis Mills, D/KX.77173 (Pembroke Dock).
- Chief Stoker James Spencer, C/K.62544 (King's Norton).
- Chief Stoker Harold Taylor, D/K.63395 (Plymouth).
- Chief Motor Mechanic Alexander Baxter, P/MX.78834 (Glasgow).
- Chief Motor Mechanic Frederick Blain, P/MX.78085 (Belfast).
- Chief Motor Mechanic (L) Fourth. Class Lewis Ernest Lewis, D/MX.75324 (Bargded).
- Acting Chief Motor Mechanic 4th Class Frederick James Horne, D/MX.98304.
- Acting Chief Motor Mechanic John Edward William Snoswell, P/MX.116284 (Gillingham).
- Chief Shipwright Clarence James Burgess, P/MX.52977 (Gosport).
- Chief Shipwright John Patrick Johnson, R.221129 (Dundee).
- Shipwright 3rd Class Kenneth Vivian Burns, D/MX.51880 (Devonport).
- Chief Engineman Alexander Farquhar, LT/X.417E.U.
- Chief Engineman Harry Hughes, LT/KX.98154 (Hull).
- Wartime Chief Engineman William Taws Munro, LT/X.382E.T (Aberdeen).
- Wartime Chief Engineman William Reveli, LT/KX.99052 (Hull).
- Chief Engineman Robert Albert Ridley, LT/KX.102439 (Grimsby).
- Chief Engineman John Robert Wright, LT/KX.106151 (Hull).
- Acting Chief Engineman Edward Ritchie, LT/KX.110490 (Musselburgh).
- Second Hand John Morrison Wilson Edgar, LT/JX.225530 (Dunure, Ayrshire).
- Second Hand Peter Johnston, LT/JX.215599 (Musselburgh).
- Stores Chief Petty Officer William Edward George Briggs, P/MX.45451 (Portsmouth).
- Stores Chief Petty Officer Joseph Cox, D/MX.52768 (Plymouth).
- Chief Petty Officer Cook (S.) William Victor Hearn, P/MX.45004 (Cosham).
- Chief Petty Officer Cook (S.) Allan Van Eck Smithurst, C/M.33903 (Bedford).
- Bandmaster 1st Class Francis Hugh Owen, R.M.B.2991 (Deal).
- Petty Officer Alfred Leonard Downey, D/J.109308 (Devonport).
- Petty Officer Stanley Charles Holmes, D/JX.128036.
- Petty Officer Torpedo Coxswain George William Jiggins, C/J.115283 (Abingdon).
- Petty Officer Derrick Francis Minchinton, P/JX.157520 (Newcastle upon Tyne).
- Petty Officer Francis James Rice, D/J.111895 (Plymouth).
- Petty Officer 3rd Class Cornelius Seery, C/JX.126122 (Gravesend).
- Petty. Officer Alexander Bruce Sinclair, P/SSX.23429 (Loch Fyne).
- Petty Officer Albert John Skinner, C/JX.186553 (Walthamstow).
- Petty Officer Reginald Charles Wilson, D/JX.136600 (Hatfield).
- Petty Officer Hedley Sidney George Yeoman, D/J.96634 (Newton Abbot).
- Temporary Petty Officer James Elliott Freemantie, P/JX.127256 (Southampton).
- Temporary Acting Petty Officer Albert Edgar Behenna, D/JX.204756 (Cardiff).
- Temporary Acting Petty Officer Arthur Brooklyn, C/JX.213039 (Hillingdon Heath).
- Temporary Acting Petty Officer Dudley Edward Tremaine Burns, P/JX.201370 (Plumstead).
- Temporary Acting Petty Officer Lawrence Patrick Carney, P/J.79082 (East Ham).
- Temporary Acting Petty Officer Eric Lawrence Carr, P/JX.171372 (Bexley Heath).
- Temporary Acting Petty Officer Robert Criggie, P/X.10759B (Gourdon).
- Temporary Acting Petty Officer William Malcolm Hannay, P/JX.274518 (Erith).
- Temporary Acting Petty Officer John Edward Kendrick, D/JX.194889 (Meavy, Devon).
- Acting Temporary Petty Officer Frederick George May, C/J.100006 (Strood).
- Yeoman of Signals Douglas Robert James Clare, D/JX.159311 (Staunton, Glos.).
- Temporary Convoy Yeoman of Signals Arthur Batty, C/JX.182800 (Huddersfield).
- Temporary Convoy Yeoman of Signals Frederick Clarke, C/JX.172940 (Stoke-on-Trent).
- Temporary Convoy Yeoman of Signals Victor William Ellis, C/JX.171137 (Canvey Island).
- Temporary Convoy Yeoman of Signals Alfred Ronald Marriott, G/JX.172964 (Nottingham).
- Temporary Convoy Yeoman of Signals Charles Ernest Boyd Newland, C/JX.174063 (Paddington).
- Convoy Yeoman of Signals Dennis Pitkeathley, C/JX.171159 (Blyth).
- Temporary Convoy Yeoman of Signals George Tate, C/JX.172064 (Liverpool).
- Temporary Convoy Yeoman of Signals Russell Gordon Webb, C/JX.174072 (Bramhall, Cheshire).
- Petty Officer Telegraphist Eric Bristow, C/JX.140819 (Woodford Bridge, Essex).
- Petty Officer Telegraphist John Edwin Caygill, C/JX.139671 (Redcar).
- Petty Officer Telegraphist Eric William Doughty, D/SSX.18289 (Loughborough).
- Petty Officer Telegraphist William Edward Valentine Palmer, C/JX.136870 (Rochester).
- Petty Officer Telegraphist Edward Stanley Turner, D/JX.141577 (Manchester).
- Temporary Acting Petty Officer Telegraphist Bernard Alfred Best, R.C.N.3531 (Ottawa).
- Temporary Petty Officer Telegraphist William Dargavel, D/J.52441 (Plymouth).
- Ordnance Artificer 4th Class Bertie George Parkins, C/MX.56123 (Ramsgate).
- Stoker Petty Officer Clifford Ralph Brocklehurst, C/KX.82835 (Sheffield).
- Stoker Petty Officer John Norman Cramer, P/KX.76220 (Lewes).
- Stoker Petty Officer Joseph Arthur Edgerton, P/KX.96656 (Bradford).
- Stoker Petty Officer William Henry Hocking, D/KX.90318 (Devonport).
- Stoker Petty Officer William Turner, D/KX.82623 (Berwick).
- Temporary Stoker Petty Officer Charles Rupert Francis Hesse, D/KX.86857 (Plymouth).
- Petty Officer Motor Mechanic William Richard Clements, P/MX.99295 (Findon, Sussex).
- Petty Officer Motor Mechanic Walter Crabtree, D/MX.117548 (Rochdale).
- Petty Officer Motor Mechanic Charles Jenvey, D/MX.98502 (Barnes, S.W.13).
- Petty Officer Motor Mechanic James Jordan, D/MX.74915 (Leeds).
- Petty Officer Motor Mechanic John Hurst Lacey, P/MX.101921.
- Petty Officer Motof Mechanic Cornelius Paul, C/MX.116875 (Henley-on-Thames).
- Petty Officer Motor Mechanic Thomas Telfer, C/KX.89166 (St. Albans).
- Petty Officer Radio Mechanic Jack Holder, P/MX.99824.
- Temporary Petty Officer Radio Mechanic (W) Harry Wade, P/MX.116310 (Leeds).
- Shipwright 4th Class Philip Sidney Coast, C/MX.55754 (Gillingham).
- Wartime Engineman Samuel Thomas Aston, LT/KX.116112 (Cleethorpes).
- Engineman Arne Kristiansen, LT/KX.113499.
- Temporary Sick Berth Petty Officer Herbert John Pullin, D/SBRX.6545 (Bristol).
- Petty Officer Writer Bryan Jarman Wright, C/MX.71805.
- Stores Petty Officer Sidney George Heskett, P/MX.51836 (St. Helens, I.O.W.).
- Temporary Petty Officer Cook (O) Frederick Thomas Sayer, C/MX.51418 (Birkenhead).
- Leading Seaman Charles Barrett, C/J.41421 (Market Lavington, Wilts).
- Leading Seaman Lewis Montgomery Bryden. C/TDX.1658.
- Leading Seaman Albert Collins, LT/JX.223345 (Sheerness).
- Wartime Leading Seaman Thomas Henry Edwards, LT/X.8097C (Moefre, Anglesey).
- Wartime Leading Seaman Philip Glover, LT/JX.180157 (Cleethorpes).
- Leading Seaman Ebenezer Haydn Lewis, D/JX.129180 (Cardiff).
- Wartime Leading Seaman Hugh McClelland, LT/JX.203700 (Hartlepool).
- Leading Seaman John William Maskery, LT/JX.225831 (Stoke-on-Trent).
- Leading Seaman Thomas Riddell, C/JX.355364.
- Leading Seaman James Daley Ritchie, LT/JX.167009 (Aberdeen).
- Leading Seaman James Henry Williams, LT/JX.221354 (Hull).
- Temporary Acting Leading Seaman Ro/ Middleton Ayre, D/JX.223717 (Cardiff).
- Temporary Acting Leading Seaman Harry Bray, C/JX.209765 (Leicester).
- Temporary Acting Leading Seaman Charles Henry Cobb, P/JX.261096.
- Temporary Acting Leading Seaman John Davies, D/JX.239905 (Stafford).
- Temporary Acting Leading Seaman John William Gregory, P/JX.220291 (Nottingham).
- Temporary Acting Leading Seaman Frederick Ely Hudson, C/JX.249958 (West Norwood).
- Acting Leading Seaman Llewellyn Warlow, C/JX.187373.
- Acting Leading Seaman Arthur Whalley, C/JX.347426 (Wigan).
- Leading Signalman Frank Eldred, C/JX.172462.
- Leading Signalman Charles William Skinner, D/J.42676 (Boston, Lincs).
- Convoy Leading Signalman Richard Brown Fullerton, C/JX.172464 (Liverpool).
- Temporary Convoy Leading Signalman Owen Jones, C/JX.172476 (Liverpool).
- Temporary Convoy Leading Signalman Thomas O'Meara, C/JX.171155 (Southampton).
- Temporary Convoy Leading Signalman Lewis Standring, C/JX.171089 (Manchester).
- Leading Telegraphist Robert Ackers, P/SSX.33328 (Caernarvon).
- Leading Telegraphist Joseph Clark, C/J. 115614 (Newcastle upon Tyne).
- Leading Telegraphist Wiliam Healey, D/JX.250727 (Shepherds Bush).
- Leading Telegraphist Dennis Lethby, P/LdX.5481.
- Acting Leading Telegraphist Stanley Frederick Coppin, D/JX.228689 (Cheltenham).
- Leading Stoker Joe Adams, C/KX.127512 (Old Seaton, Notts.).
- Leading Stoker Alfred Herbert Bayliss, D/KX.157986.
- Leading Sick Berth Attendant Leslie George Spencer, P/RNASBR/X.7667 (Dartmouth).
- Temporary Leading Writer James Caddick, C/ MX.86912 (Warrington).
- Leading Cook Ronald, Frederick Jillings, LT/MX.83331 (Grimsby).
- Temporary Leading Cook (S) Robert Edwin Gale, D/MX.64215 (Willesden Green).
- Leading Steward Sydney Edwin Walters, LT/LX.30319 (Palmers Green, N.13).
- Lance-Sergeant David George Ensor, 1466722, Third Regiment, Maritime Royal Artillery
- Able Seaman Cording Edward Adams, D/J.45706 (Plymouth).
- Able Seaman John Henry Sylvester Correy, D/JX.417746 (Ashton-under-Lyne).
- Able Seaman Douglas Roy Horder, P/JX.263083 (Bournemouth).
- Able Seaman George William Jordan, D/JX.253214 (Birmingham).
- Able Seaman Charles Reader Kirk, P/JX.246782 (Gray's, Essex).
- Able Seaman George Roffe, P/J.31001 (Lilley, near Luton).
- Able Seaman Frederick John Samuel Waterton, C/JX.294197 (Walthamstow).
- Able Seaman William Frederick Wright, P/JX.274820.
- Acting Able Seaman James Ernest Allingham, P/JX.234548 (Trottiscliffe).
- Acting Able Seaman Thomas Bland Caine, C/JX.267901 (St. Helens, Co. Durham).
- Acting Able Seaman Albert Edward Davies, C/JX.278098 (Neath).
- Acting Able Seaman Ernest Howard Dowbekin, C/JX.266533 (Egerton, near Bolton).
- Acting Able Seaman Herbert Henry Harrand, P/JX.267796 (Howden, Yorks).
- Acting Able Seaman William James Lynn, D/JX.289731 (Hullsands).
- Acting Able Seaman Bernard Joseph O'Hagan, D/JX.290347 (Liverpool).
- Acting Able Seaman Leonard Pragnell, C/JX.289953 (Durham City).
- Acting Able Seaman Alexander Purse, D/JX,254134 (Greencastle, Co. Antrim).
- Acting Able Seaman Edward Roberts, C/JX.266034 (Rochdale).
- Acting Able Seaman Arnold Webster, D/JX.291360 (Sheffield).
- Acting Able Seaman John Henry Winship, C/JX.289896 (Gateshead).
- Acting Able Seaman Albert Edward Woods, C/JX.234793 (Cleethorpes).
- Wireman George Henry Jane, C/MX.118563 (Liverpool).
- Wireman George Winham, C/MX.118632 (Brierly, near Barnsley).
- Signalman Henry John Browning, LT/LD/X.4211 (Oakdale, near Poole).
- Signalman Donald Charles Featherstone, D/JX.279314 (Morden).
- Signalman David Anderson Guild, DJX.309387 (Goredridge, Midlothian).
- Signalman James Robert Rowlands, C/JX.360102 (Shepherd's Bush).
- Telegraphist Alan Charles Habben, C/JX.271286 (London, S.E.12).
- Telegraphist James Dunbar McWilliam, D/JX.340041 (Aberdeen).
- Telegraphist Stephen George Rose, D/JX.250541 (Middleton, Co. Cork).
- Telegraphist George Thomas Smith, P/JX.235805 (London).
- Coder Albert Donald Chown, P/JX.229659 (Norwich).
- Stoker 1st Class Robert Brindle Finch, C/KX.156986 (Blackburn).
- Stoker 1st Class William John Mounce, LT/KX.529177 (Cambourne).
- Stoker William Henry Stone, LT/KX.112669 (Kingsbridge).
- Temporary Acting Stoker John Stanley Avis, C/KX.135986 (London).
- Stores Assistant William Grant, P/MX.671816 (Ashington).
- Seaman Thomas Anderson, LT/JX.305390 (Farnborough).
- Seaman Basil Gunn, LT/JX.210926 (North Shields).
- Seaman Edward Mark Humphrey, LT/JX.280494 (Brighton).
- Seaman John Jones, LT/JX.213977 (Newcastle).
- Seaman John Noteyoung, LT/JX.355553 (Middlesbrough).
- Seaman William Arthur Richardson, LT/JX.255355 (Grimsby).
- Seaman Thomas John Wilson, LT/JX.280607 (Anstruther).
- Seaman James Henry Winters, LT/JX.385490 (Uxbridge).

==== Bar to the Distinguished Service Medal ====
- Chief Mechanician George Merrick Richard Hide, P/K.61051 (Hurstpierpoint).

=== Royal Red Cross (RRC) ===
Royal Navy

- Grace Butterworth Martin, ARRC, Acting Principal Matron, Queen Alexandra's Royal Naval Nursing Service.
- Madeline Hadderton, ARRC, Acting Matron, Queen Alexandra's Royal Naval Nursing Service.
- Evelyn Jean Lawrie, ARRC, Acting Matron, Queen Alexandra's Royal Naval Nursing Reserve.

Army

- Evelyn Margaret Bamber, Matron (206013), Queen Alexandra's Imperial Military Nursing Service.
- Olive Clark, Sister (acting Matron) (206071), Queen Alexandra's Imperial Military Nursing Service.
- Kathleen Brett Cavies, Sister (acting Principal Matron) (206114), Queen Alexandra's Imperial Military Nursing Service.
- Elsie Muriel Ethelinda Dawe, Sister (acting Principal Matron) (206109), Queen Alexandra's Imperial Military Nursing Service.
- Doris Girdlestone, Matron (206163), Queen Alexandra's Imperial Military Nursing Service.
- Constance Hose, Matron (206109), Queen Alexandra's Imperial Military Nursing Service.
- Mary Havelock Archer Hudson, Matron (acting Principal Matron) (206185), Queen Alexandra's Imperial Military Nursing Service.
- Catherine Jane Macrae, Matron (206299), Queen Alexandra's Imperial Military Nursing Service.
- Elizabeth Ellen Ricks, Senior Sister (acting Principal Matron) (206406), Queen Alexandra's Imperial Military Nursing Service.
- Margarita Marie Bennett Skehan, Sister (acting Principal Matron) (206466), Queen Alexandra's Imperial Military Nursing Service.
- Esther Emma Watkin, Principal Matron (206514), Queen Alexandra's Imperial Military Nursing Service.
- Iris Caroline Comber Withers, ARRC. Principal Matron (206515), Queen Alexandra's Imperial Military Nursing Service.
- Ellen Jane Cullingford, Sister (acting Matron) (206900), Queen Alexandra's Imperial Military Nursing Service Reserve.
- Ida Maud Smith, Matron (N.Z.4498), Indian Military Nursing Service.
- Ethel Rex Lewis (Matron), British Red Cross Society.
- Lieutenant-Colonel Edith Lydia Shaw, Australian Army Nursing Service.
- Major Clara Jane Shumack, Australian Army Nursing Service.

Royal Air Force

- Matron Helen Wilson Cargill, ARRC (5022), Princess Mary's Royal Air Force Nursing Service.
- Acting Matron Nora Meikle, ARRC (5028), Princess Mary's Royal Air Force Nursing Service.
- Matron Ila Mary Smith, Royal Australian Air Force Nursing Service.

==== Bar to Royal Red Cross ====
- Chief Principal Matron Winifred Maud Coulthurst, OBE, RRC (5002), Princess Mary's Royal Air Force Nursing Service.
- Acting Principal Matron Jessie Dorothy Jackson, RRC (5004), Princess Mary's Royal Air Force Nursing Service.

=== Associate of the Royal Red Cross (ARRC) ===
Royal Navy

- Muriel Evelyn Cawston, OBE, Acting Matron, Queen Alexandra's Royal Naval Nursing Service.
- Barbara Nockolds, Acting Matron, Queen Alexandra's Royal Naval Nursing Service.
- Fannie Collas, Acting Senior Sister, Queen Alexandra's Royal Naval Nursing Reserve.
- Kathleen Mary Sabin, Acting Senior Sister, Queen Alexandra's Royal Naval Nursing Reserve.
- Ruth Mary Bradfield, Supervising VAD Nursing Member.
- Winifred Ada Clark, Supervising VAD Nursing Member.
- Florence Beatrice Griffin, Head VAD Nursing Member
- Ada Nightingale, VAD Nursing Member, Commandant.
- Mary Patricia Symonds, Head VAD Nursing Member.

Army

- Celia Mary Coneys, Sister (acting Matron) (206077), Queen Alexandra's Imperial Military Nursing Service.
- Molly Downing, Sister (206134), Queen Alexandra's Imperial Military Nursing Service.
- Beatrice Louise Ferrier, Sister (Assistant Matron) (206146), Queen Alexandra's Imperial Military Nursing Service.
- Irene Minnie Dorothy Higgins, Sister (Assistant Matron) (208411), Queen Alexandra's Imperial Military Nursing Service.
- Jessie Andrews, Senior Sister (206607), Queen Alexandra's Imperial Military Nursing Service Reserve.
- Elizabeth Janet Baxter, Sister (206677), Queen Alexandra's Imperial Military Nursing Service Reserve.
- Margaret Gaskell, Sister (208337), Queen Alexandra's Imperial Military Nursing Service Reserve.
- Dorothy Bernice Hemming, Sister (208483), Queen Alexandra's Imperial Military Nursing Service Reserve.
- Edith Clare Inskip, Sister (218286), Queen Alexandra's Imperial Military Nursing Service Reserve.
- Jessie Johnson, Sister (221058), Queen Alexandra's Imperial Military Nursing Service Reserve.
- Winifred May Walbridge, Sister (209407), Queen Alexandra's Imperial Military Nursing Service Reserve.
- Zadie Pauline Moore Wilkinson, Sister (209525), Queen Alexandra's Imperial Military Nursing Service Reserve.
- Ellen Bather, Sister (acting Matron) (223698), Territorial Army Nursing Service.
- Ellen Kate Botting, Sister (209836), Territorial Army Nursing Service.
- Lilian Margaret Haseldon, Sister (acting Senior Sister) (213389), Territorial Army Nursing Service.
- Irene Barbara Hickson, Sister (213520), Territorial Army Nursing Service.
- Annie Elizabeth Medley, Sister (230094), Territorial Army Nursing Service.
- Louisa Ann Parry, Sister (215154), Territorial Army Nursing Service.
- No. 611060 Corporal Beatrice Mona Dutton, Voluntary Aid Detachment.
- No. 640014 Nursing Member Winifred Hammond, Voluntary Aid Detachment.
- No. 557247 Corporal Kathleen Lillian Sturton, Voluntary Aid Detachment.
- Aleyamma Thomas, Sister (Assistant Matron) (11370), Indian Military Nursing Service.
- Evelyn Doris Coulson (Matron), British Red Cross Society.
- Winifred Elizabeth Philips (Senior Sister), British Red Cross Society.
- Captain Kathleen Patricia Bonnin, Australian Army Nursing Service.
- Captain Ellen Margaret Fenner, Australian Army Nursing Service.
- Captain Jessie Margaret Langham, Australian Army Nursing Service.
- Captain Ethel Youman, Australian Army Nursing Service.
- Miss Beth Webster (Charge Sister), New Zealand Army Nursing Service.

Royal Air Force

- Acting Senior Sister Phylis Hepburn Blackall (5122), Princess Mary's Royal Air Force Nursing Service.
- Acting Senior Sister Elsie Jane Mirian Fox (5072), Princess Mary's Royal Air Force Nursing Service.
- Acting Senior Sister Jessie Mary Higgins (5223), Princess Mary's Royal Air Force Nursing Service.
- Acting Senior Sister Annie Mercia Horn (5616), Princess Mary's Royal Air Force Nursing Service.
- Acting Senior Sister Gwenillian Jones (5094), Princess Mary's Royal Air Force Nursing Service.
- Acting Senior Sister Louisa Alice Kay (5193), Princess Mary's Royal Air Force Nursing Service.
- Acting Senior Sister Nancy Lawford (5248), Princess Mary's Royal Air Force Nursing Service.
- Acting Senior Sister Florence Eva Perry (5333), Princess Mary's Royal Air Force Nursing Service.
- Sister Catherine Mary Graham (5487), Princess Mary's Royal Air Force Nursing Service.
- Sister Pearl Edna Martin (5548), Princess Mary's Royal Air Force Nursing Service.
- Sister Betty Slader (5288), Princess Mary's Royal Air Force Nursing Service.
- Doris Louise Boyd (W.505012), VAD Grade I Nursing Member.
- Senior Sister Martha Madge Hateley, Royal Australian Air Force Nursing Service.

=== Air Force Cross (AFC) ===
==== Royal Air Force ====
Acting Group Captain

- Douglas Lloyd Amlot, DFC.

Acting Wing Commanders

- Peter John Cundy, DSO, DFC (43098).
- Denis William Edmonds, DFC (39435).

Squadron Leaders

- John Clayton (41256).
- Jack Richard Goodman, DFC (126540), RAFVR.

Acting Squadron Leaders

- Kenneth Sydney Booth (63478), RAFVR.
- David Ingram Chapman (60339), RAFVR.
- Walter Sidney Chubb (45894).
- George Walter Couzens (44823).
- Benjamin Richard Hall, DFC (43938).
- Nicholas Leonard Haworth-Booth (80552), RAFVR.
- Walter Sinclair Kennedy, DFC (84999), RAFVR.
- Wallace Ivor Lashbrook, DFC, DFM (45895).
- John Gordon Seymour Linacre, DFM (112188), RAFVR.
- Robert Alfred Marsh (70869), RAFO.
- Michael John Philip Martin, DFC (74335), RAFVR.
- Albert Claud Bradish Morgan, DFC (102966), RAFVR.
- William Richard Morris (47463), RAFVR.
- William Albert Mostyn-Brown (42517).
- Ian Cameron Murison (41799), RAFO.
- Grenville Rees (43254).
- Peter Henry Stembridge, DFC (118184), RAFVR.
- Thomas Alexander Stewart, DFC (114955), RAFVR.
- Douglas Hillyiard Stuart (42159), RAFO.
- Francis Herbert Stubbs, DFM (43480).

Flight Lieutenants

- Douglas Ames (118030), RAFVR.
- John Edward Atkins, AFM (46163).
- Eric Bates (60456), RAFVR.
- John Campbell Blair, DFC (138194), RAFVR.
- Frederick Roy Bolton-Smith (124448), RAFVR.
- Alfred Denmark Burt (49994).
- William Cummins (46775).
- Frank William Dewell (43357).
- William Alfred Doherty (52176).
- George Frederick Roedel Duffy (44629).
- Edmund Percival Eastment (45206).
- Raymond Arthur Gifford (102069), RAFVR.
- Henry Campbell Graham (126458), RAFVR.
- Donald Findlay Greig (85222), RAFVR.
- Trevor Arthur Hampton (42220), RAFO.
- Frank Charles Heavery, DFM (145840), RAFVR.
- Archibald Frederick Herbert (150173), RAFVR.
- Alexander Johnstone (120327), RAFVR.
- John Thornett Lawrence (104428), RAFVR.
- Alfred Edgar Lomas (144467), RAFVR.
- Lancelot Arthur Martin (60068), RAFVR.
- Dennis John Mason (122158), RAFVR.
- Samuel Roy Pemberton (61990), RAFVR.
- Jim Procter (85636), RAFVR.
- Alfred Louis Roberts (46776).
- Harry Rogers, DFC (144649), RAFVR.
- Thomas Muir Scott (89309), RAFVR.
- Jack Shearsmith, AFM (43346).
- Charles Falkinder Smith (49066).
- Ronald Austin Hedgeland Smith (46120).
- Lionel Edgar Tarplee (85252), RAFVR.
- Graham Neville Taylor (61013), RAFVR.
- Reginald Sidney Taylor (118439), RAFVR.
- William Paul Tudor (67702), RAFVR.
- George Williamson (115946), RAFVR.

Acting Flight Lieutenant

- Richard Robinson Lord (173779), RAFVR.

Flying Officers

- Arthur Edward Binham (161311), RAFVR.
- John Stanley Birkett-Evans (145320), RAFVR.
- Charles Leslie Boulding (161611), RAFVR.
- Ronald William Henry Bray (173375), RAFVR.
- Edward James Churchill (161317), RAFVR.
- Frank Norton, DFC (172427), RAFVR.
- Fred William Ruddle (160197), RAFVR.
- Gordon Menzies Rutherford (179999), RAFVR.
- George Adamson Stafford (158301), RAFVR.
- Jack Stonier (53631).
- John Whelan (52561).

Pilot Officer

- Robert William Court (177574), RAFVR.

Warrant Officers

- Frederick Thomas Henry Brewer (1313279), RAFVR.
- Ernest Wilfred Kennett (1260640), RAFVR.
- Hugh McMillan (748219), RAFVR.

==== Royal Australian Air Force ====
Wing Commander

- Gordon Eyres (Aus.291967).

Acting Wing Commanders

- Cuthbert Allan James Lum (Aus.281774).
- Stephen Wallace Martin (Aus.251695).

Squadron Leaders

- Allan Frank McSweyn (Aus.402005).
- John Donefllan Balfe (Aus.272371).
- Kenneth Selby Brown (Aus.260680).

Acting Squadron Leader

- Edward John Elliott, DFC (Aus.415127).

Flight Lieutenants

- Terence Gerard Denis Roberts (Aus.402807).
- James Joseph Leahey (Aus.402511).
- Wilfred John Renfisch (Aus.401150).
- Harold Edwin Teede (Aus.406739).

Flying Officers

- Colin William Dunn (Aus.408824).
- Alan Lindsay White (Aus.407205).

==== Royal Canadian Air Force ====
Acting Wing Commander

- James Gardner Stewart, DFC (Can/J.10959).

Squadron Leaders

- John Arthur Cook (Can/J.9352).
- William Frank Hales, DFC (Can/J.6498).

Acting Squadron Leader

- Samuel Chester Tugwell (Can/J.6387).

Flight Lieutenants

- Robert Austin Adams (Can/J.7340).
- Charles Gaylon Harville (Can/C.2719).
- Charles Francis Payne (Can/J.20212).

Acting Flight Lieutenant

- Hubert Dudley Davy (Can/J.17185).

Flying Officer

- Thomas Haughton Gordon (Can/J.18972).

Warrant Officer

- Warren Jackson Wright (Can/R.131874).

==== Royal New Zealand Air Force ====
Squadron Leader

- Vincent David Gain.

Acting Squadron Leaders

- Kenneth Godfrey King.
- Allan Gerald Sievers.

Flight Lieutenants

- Alfred Sydney Drew (N.Z.404560).
- David Laurence Bade.
- Lawrence Alan Lawton.
- Robert Francis Watson.

Acting Flight Lieutenant

- Sydney Harold Manning (N.Z.41921).

Flying Officers

- Alexander Agnew Appleby (N.Z.41862).
- George Willis Kidd (N.Z.417068).

==== South African Air Force ====
Lieutenant

- Alfred Norman Mitchell Marsberg (103972V).

==== Bar to Air Force Cross ====
Royal Air Force

- Acting Group Captain Douglas Henry Vincent Craig, AFC.

=== Air Force Medal (AFM) ===
Royal Air Force
Flight Sergeants

- 979248 George Bogdanchikoff (now Pilot Officer), RAFVR.
- 945185 John Henry Bullock (now Pilot Officer), RAFVR.
- 909311 Harold Arthur Coombes, RAFVR.
- 1800769 Edgar Richard Peirce, RAFVR.
- 946807 Eric Samuel Wood, RAFVR.

Sergeant

- 1309090 Isaac Andrews Owens, RAFVR.

Leading Aircraftman

- 1250089 Terence Jackman, RAFVR.

=== King's Commendation for Valuable Service in the Air ===
==== Royal Air Force ====
Group Captain

- J. F. X. McKenna, RAF (deceased).

Squadron Leader

- J. R. Tobin, AFC (39909), RAF (deceased).

Acting Squadron Leader

- J. H. V. Millington, DFC (44405).

Flight Lieutenants

- B. E. Acton-Bond (123942), RAFVR.
- R. B. Beavington (132333), RAFVR.
- J. F. L. Bowes (122349), RAFVR.
- R. T. Bromwich (107457), RAFVR.
- J. H. Cheaney (66009), RAFVR.
- H. R. Clarke (102587), RAFVR.
- K. Cotton (131615), RAFVR.
- G. W. Fairbank (85926), RAFVR.
- J. P. Jamieson (83708), RAFVR.
- A. O. Jones (126460), RAFVR.
- J. McGill, DFC (64899), RAFVR.
- H. J. Merchant (108856), RAFVR.
- H. A. McK. Pascoe (116404), RAFVR.
- T. I. Petersen, DFC (113495), RAFVR.
- E. A. Southey, AFC (110344), RAFVR.
- A. G. J. Taylor (131089), RAFVR.
- L. G. Thorne (108559), RAFVR.
- R. Towner (135743), RAFVR.
- A. Williams (131621), RAFVR.

Flying Officers

- M. E. Macdonald (173534), RAFVR.
- R. J. Nixon (182192), RAFVR.
- J. H. Raybould (158568), RAFVR.
- D. A. Roberts (162827), RAFVR.
- J. A. Robertson (162533), RAFVR.
- L. J. Rose (178361), RAFVR.
- B. G. T. Stanbridge (163507), RAFVR.

Warrant Officers

- H. J. C. Heanes (656831).
- A. H. Paver (1590949), RAFVR.
- H. Webber (755350), RAFVR.

Sergeants

- 971170 G. Hilton, RAFVR.
- 653936 A. R. Sherman.

Corporals

- 1122130 J. A. Devitt, RAFVR.
- 1292356 R. S. Smith, RAFVR.

==== Royal Australian Air Force ====
Squadron Leader

- L. C. Littler (Aus.402513).

Acting Squadron Leaders

- 1. C. Anderson (Aus.406015).
- J. F. Cotterell (Aus.400782).
- R. M. Meares (Aus.262881).

Flight Lieutenants

- R. W. Adsett (Aus.402194).
- F. J. Castles (Aus. 408062).
- J. Deacon (Aus.406713).
- E. M. Hughes (Aus.408847).
- I. W. Johnson (Aus.401797).
- L. N. Keeler (Aus.403593).
- R. C. Mason (Aus.416224).
- R. H. Smith (Aus.416075).
- W. H. Stephens (Aus.403964).

Acting Flight Lieutenant

- P. V. Duffy (Aus.405727).

Flying Officer

- O. E. K. Tink (Aus.401289).
- E. J. Varney (Aus.428536).

==== Royal Canadian Air Force ====
Flight Lieutenant

- W. G. Campbell (Can./J.7785).

Flying Officer

- K. W. Warner (Can./J.27369).

==== Royal Indian Air Force ====
Flying Officers

- J. D. Aquino (Ind.1777).
- L. R. D. Blunt (Ind.1994)
- E. D. Masillamana (Ind.1774).
- R. Singh (Ind.2133).

=== King's Commendation for Brave Conduct ===
==== Royal Air Force ====
Flight Lieutenants

- D. Crichton (61873), RAFVR.
- J. A. Crossley (79594), RAFVR.

Flying Officer

- T. A. Clarke (158975), RAFVR.

Warrant Officer

- D. J. E. Hicks (616909).

Sergeants

- 1605298 P. T. Ellis, RAFVR.
- 551685 L. R. Shott, RAFVR.

Corporals

- 1222819 W. J. Dance, RAFVR.
- D. Musgrave.

Leading Aircraftman

- 1564073 D. Clarke, RAFVR.

Section Officer

- F. W. Buchanan (5698), WAAF.

Corporal

- 2052387 E. P. Norman, WAAF.

Leading Aircraftwoman

- 2119335 C. B. Morrison, WAAF.

==== Royal Australian Air Force ====
Leading Aircraftman

- C. Larsen (Aus.123033) (deceased).

=== King's Police and Fire Services Medal (KPFSM) ===
==== For Gallantry ====
England & Wales
Police

- Herbert George Mayger, Sergeant, Metropolitan Police Force.
- Albert Edwin Enticknap, Constable, Surrey Joint Police Force.
- Harold Poynton Withers, Inspector, Lincolnshire Constabulary.
- Arthur Selby, Constable, Lincolnshire Constabulary.

Fire Services

- Thomas Bertram Goodman, Assistant and Deputy Fire Force Commander, No. 30 (East Kent) Fire Force.

==== For Distinguished Service ====
England & Wales
Police

- Commander William John Adlam Willis, MVO, OBE, CGM, Royal Navy, Chief Constable, Bedfordshire Constabulary.
- Harry Barnes, Chief Constable, Blackpool Borough Police Force.
- Raymond Hatherell Fooks, Chief Constable, Lincolnshire Constabulary.
- Samuel Goodwin Buttress, Assistant Chief Constable, Staffordshire Constabulary.
- Thomas Basil Thompson, Superintendent, Metropolitan Police Force.
- William Francis Thomas, Superintendent, Cardiff City Police Force.
- Reginald Arthur Abbiss, Superintendent, Leeds City Police Force.

Fire Services

- Percy George Garon, MC, GM, formerly Fire Force Commander, No. 11 (Southend) Fire Force.
- Edward Benjamin Eastland, Divisional Officer, No. 12 (Cambridge) Fire Force.
- John Henry Farmer, Assistant Fire Force Commander, No. 17 (Bristol) Fire Force.
- John Wilkins, Divisional Officer, No. 29 (Preston) Fire Force.
- Harry Hicks, BEM, Divisional Officer, No. 14 (Portsmouth) Fire Force.

Scotland
Police

- David Muir Robertson, Chief Constable, Clackmannanshire Constabulary.
- Duncan McPhedran, Superintendent, Glasgow City Police Force.

Fire Services

- Thomas Carson, Divisional Officer, No. 1 (Western) Area, Scotland.

Northern Ireland
Police

- James Cherry, Head Constable, Royal Ulster Constabulary.

Southern Rhodesia

- Major John Ellis Ross, Assistant Commissioner, British South Africa Police, India.

India

- George Hubert Parke Bailey, Indian Police, District Superintendent of Police, Madras.
- Babu Chandra Mohan Mukharji, InspectorGeneral of Police, Criminal Investigation Department, Bengal.
- Khan Bahadur Nusserwanji Nowrosji Sadri, Inspector-General of Police, Kolhapur State.
- Kasturi Lal, Sub-Inspector of Police, Punjab.

Colonies, Protectorates & Mandated Territories

- Thomas Victor William Finlay, Assistant Commissioner of Police, Nigeria.
- William John Howard Beard, Superintendent of Stores, Palestine Police & Prisons Service.
- John Patrick Ilbert Fforde, Deputy Superintendent of Police, Palestine.
- Richard Charles Catling, Acting Deputy Superintendent of Police, Palestine.
- Albert Edward Conquest, Assistant Superintendent of Police, Palestine.
- Frederick Augustine Herbert, Inspector of Dockyard Police, Malta.

Occupied Territories Administration

- Lieutenant-Colonel Frederick Henry Miller, Commissioner of Police & Prisons, Tripolitania.

=== Colonial Police Medal (CPM) ===
Southern Rhodesia

- Cyril James Giles, Sub-Inspector, British South Africa Police.
- Daniel Harold Greengrass, MM. Inspector, British South Africa Police.
- Henry George Seward, Chief Superintendent, British South Africa Police.

Colonies, Protectorates & Mandated Territories

- Fitzherbert Alleyne, Warrant Officer, British Guiana Police Force.
- Emmanuel Akandu Anorue, Sub-Inspector, Nigerian Police Force.
- Eustace John Ekundayo Ashwoode, Assistant Superintendent, Sierra Leone Police Force.
- Norman Brodie, Superintendent, Northern Rhodesia Police Force.
- Edward John George Brown, Senior Assistant Superintendent, Uganda Police Force.
- John Charles, Sergeant, Trinidad Police Force.
- James Charles Coleman, Inspector, Kenya Police Force.
- William John Covell, First British Sergeant, Palestine Police Force.
- Leopold Creppy, Inspector, Gold Coast Police Force.
- Louis Cromwell, Sub-Inspector, Trinidad Police Force.
- Charles Doyle, British Constable, Palestine Police Force.
- Graham Fortescue Evelyn-Wright, Superintendent, Nigerian Police Force.
- Sebi Fadamulla, Sergeant, Kenya Police Force.
- Muuir Abu Fadel, Acting Assistant Superintendent, Palestine Police Force.
- Frederick Maurice Godliman, First British Sergeant, Palestine Police Force.
- William Ashley Govan, Superintendent, Gold Coast Police Force.
- Elias Haddad, Palestinian Inspector, Palestine Police Force.
- Major Eric Harvey Halse, Deputy Commissioner, British Somaliland Police Force.
- Robert Hamilton, British Inspector, Palestine Police Force.
- Harry Norman Instone, Assistant Superintendent, Kenya Police Force.
- Joseph Kealey, First British Sergeant, Palestine Police Force.
- Audu Kiamba, Sergeant-Major, Nigerian Police Force.
- Phillip Labadie, Corporal, Leeward Islands Police Force.
- Major John Grant Leslie, Commissioner, British Somaliland Police Force.
- Oliver Randolph Lucas, Assistant Superintendent, Sierra Leone Police Force.
- Eric Edward Morgan, Superintendent, Trinidad Police Force.
- Anthony George Morman, Inspector, Nigerian Police Force.
- Kilonzo Ngila, Second Sergeant, Kenya Police Force.
- Thomas Daniel Ogier, Superintendent, Trinidad Police Force.
- James Juma Olwang, Assistant Inspector, Kenya Police Force.
- Andrew Pickup, Superintendent, Northern Rhodesia Police Force.
- Richard Benjamin Ridley, British Inspector, Palestine Police Force.
- Philip Ezekiel Rose, Sub-Inspector, Jamaica Constabulary.
- Adan Sadiq, 3rd Sergeant, Kenya Police Force.
- Leslie Wilfrid Slater, County Superintendent, British Guiana Police Force.
- Thomas Arthur Slatter, Inspector, Kenya Police Force.
- Suliman Said Suliman, Palestinian Inspector, Palestine Police Force.
- John Millar Watt, British Constable, Palestine Police Force.
- Henry Maxwell Wellington, Detective Sergeant-Major, Jamaica Constabulary.
- Abdi Yusuf, Squadron Sergeant-Major, Armoured Cars, Somaliland Police Squadron.
