= China Burma India theater =

U.S. military designation for U.S. forces in Asia

China Burma India Theater
- Founded: 1942—1945
- Countries: United States; China; United Kingdom; India
- Role: Theater Command
- Part of: South East Asia Command
- Area of operations: New Delhi, India; Chungking, China FWD
- Engagements: Pacific War

Commanders
- Notable commanders: Joseph Stilwell; Raymond Albert Wheeler; Albert Coady Wedemeyer; Daniel Isom Sultan

Insignia
- Abbreviation: CBI

China Burma India Theater (CBI) was the United States military designation during World War II for the China and Southeast Asian or India–Burma (IBT) theaters. Operational command of Allied forces (including U.S. forces) in the CBI was officially the responsibility of the Supreme Commanders for South East Asia or China. In practice, U.S. forces were usually overseen by General Joseph Stilwell, the Deputy Allied Commander in China; the term "CBI" was significant in logistical, material, and personnel matters; it was and is commonly used within the US for these theaters.

U.S. and Chinese fighting forces in the CBI included the Chinese Expeditionary Force, the Flying Tigers, transport and bomber units flying the Hump, including the Tenth Air Force, the 1st Air Commando Group, the engineers who built the Ledo Road, the 5307th Composite Unit (Provisional), popularly known as "Merrill's Marauders", and the 5332d Brigade, Provisional or 'Mars Task Force', which assumed the Marauders' mission.

== U.S. strategy for China ==
Japanese policy towards China had long been a source of international controversy. Western powers had exploited China through the open door policy, advocated by United States diplomat William Woodville Rockhill, while Japan intervened more directly, creating the puppet-state of Manchukuo. By 1937, Japan was engaged in a full-scale war of conquest in China. The infamous Rape of Nanking galvanized Western opinion and led to direct financial aid for the Kuomintang (Nationalists) and increasing economic sanctions against Japan.

In 1941, the U.S. made a series of decisions to support China in its war with Japan: Lend Lease supplies were provided after President Franklin D. Roosevelt announced the defense of China to be vital to the defense of the United States. Over the summer, as Japan moved south into French Indo-China, the U.S., Britain and the Netherlands instituted an oil embargo on Japan, cutting off 90% of its supplies. The embargo threatened the operations of the Kwantung Army, which had over a million soldiers deployed in China. Japan responded with a tightly co-ordinated offensive on 7/8 December, simultaneously attacking Pearl Harbor, the Philippines, Malaya, Singapore, Hong Kong, Guam, Wake Island, and Thailand.

Japan cut off Allied supplies to China that had been coming through Burma. China could be supplied only by flying over the Himalaya mountains ("The Hump") from India, or capturing territory in Burma and building a new road—the Ledo Road.

== Burma ==
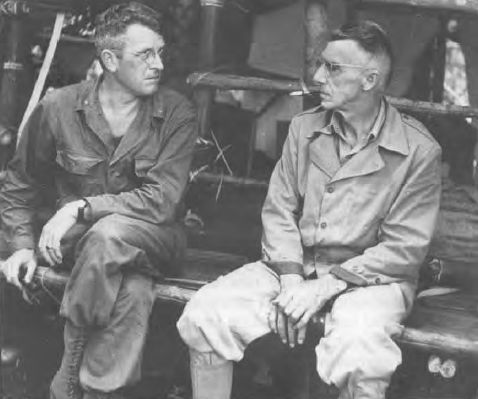
Merrill and Stilwell meet near Naubum, Burma.

In 1941 and 1942, Japan was overextended. Its naval base could not defend its conquests, and its industrial base could not strengthen its navy. To cut off China from Allied aid, it went into Burma and captured Rangoon on 8 March 1942, cutting off the Burma Road. Moving north, the Japanese took Tounggoo and captured Lashio in northern Burma on 29 April. The British, primarily concerned with India, looked to Burma as the main theater of action against Japan and wanted Chinese troops to fight there. The United States conjured up visions of millions of Chinese soldiers who would hold the Japanese then throw them back, while providing close-in airbases for a systematic firebombing of Japanese cities. Chinese Nationalist leader Chiang Kai-shek realized it was all fantasy. On the other hand, there were vast sums of American dollars available if he collaborated. He did so and managed to feed his starving soldiers, but they were so poorly equipped and led that offensive operations against the Japanese in China were impossible. However, Chiang did release the Chinese Expeditionary Force of two Chinese armies for action in Burma under Stilwell. Due to conflicts between Chiang, the British, Stilwell, and American General Claire Chennault, as well as general ill-preparedness against the more proficient Japanese army, the Burma defense collapsed. Stilwell escaped to India, but the recovery of Burma and construction of the Ledo Road to supply China became a new obsession for him.

"On April 14, 1942, William Donovan, as Coordinator of Information (forerunner of the Office of Strategic Services), activated Detachment 101 for action behind enemy lines in Burma. The first unit of its kind, the Detachment was charged with gathering intelligence, harassing the Japanese through guerrilla actions, identifying targets for the Army Air Force to bomb, and rescuing downed Allied airmen. Because Detachment 101 was never larger than a few hundred Americans, it relied on support from various tribal groups in Burma. In particular, the vigorously anti-Japanese Kachin people were vital to the unit's success."

Detachment 101's efforts opened the way for Stilwell's Chinese forces, Wingate's Raiders, Merrill's Marauders, and the counter-attack against the Japanese Imperial life-line.

== Allied command structure ==
=== U.S. and Allied land forces ===
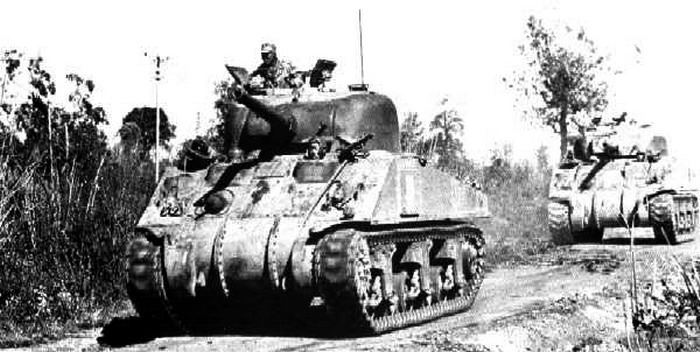
Chinese M4A4 Sherman in the CBI Battlefield

US forces in the CBI were administered by General Joseph "Vinegar Joe" Stilwell. However, unlike other combat theaters, for example the European Theater of Operations, the CBI was never a "theater of operations" and did not have an overall operational command structure. Initially U.S. land units were split. Those in China were technically commanded by Generalissimo Chiang Kai-shek, as Stillwell was Chief of Staff to the Supreme Allied Commander in China. When the GALAHAD force (later to become the 5307th Composite Unit (Provisional)) arrived in Bombay in October 1943, it came under the British-led South East Asia Command (SEAC) and Admiral Lord Mountbatten. However, Stilwell often broke the chain of command and communicated directly with the US Joint Chiefs of Staff on operational matters.

When joint allied command was agreed upon, it was decided that the senior position should be held by a British officer because the British had the greatest number of forces in India and Burma (in much the same way as the US did in the Pacific War). Admiral Lord Mountbatten was appointed as the Supreme Allied Commander of South-East Asia forces in October 1943. Chiang however later objected to deferring to Mountbatten on matters related to operations in China.

General Stilwell, who also had operational command of the Northern Combat Area Command (NCAC), a US-Chinese formation, was to report in theory to Gen. George Giffard – commander of Eleventh Army Group – so that NCAC and the British Fourteenth Army, under the command of General William Slim, could be co-ordinated. However, in practice, Gen. Stilwell never agreed to this arrangement. Stilwell was able to do this because of his multiple positions within complex command structures, including especially his simultaneous positions of Deputy Supreme Allied Commander South East Asia, and Chief of Staff to Chinese leader Generalissimo Chiang Kai-shek. As SEAC's deputy leader, Stilwell was Giffard's superior, but as operational commander of NCAC, Giffard was Stilwell's superior. As the two men did not get on, this inevitably lead to conflict and confusion.

Stilwell, however, bitterly resisted [taking orders from Giffard] ... To watch Stilwell, when hard pressed, shift his opposition from one of the several strong-points he held by virtue of his numerous Allied, American and Chinese offices, to another was a lesson in mobile offensive-defence.

— William Slim

Eventually at a SEAC meeting to sort out the chain of command for NCAC, Stilwell astonished everyone by saying "I am prepared to come under General Slim's operational control until I get to Kamaing". Although far from ideal, this compromise was accepted.

Although Stilwell was the control and co-ordinating point for all command activity in the theater, his assumption of personal direction of the advance of the Chinese Ledo forces into north Burma in late 1943 meant that he was often out of touch with both his own headquarters and with the overall situation.

Not until late 1944, after Stilwell was recalled to Washington, was the chain of command clarified. His overall role, and the CBI command, was then split among three people: Lt Gen. Raymond Wheeler became Deputy Supreme Allied Commander South East Asia; Major-General Albert Wedemeyer became Chief of Staff to Chiang Kai-shek, and commander of US Forces, China Theater (USFCT). Lt Gen. Daniel Sultan was promoted, from deputy commander of CBI to commander of US Forces, India–Burma Theater (USFIBT) and commander of the NCAC. The 11th Army Group was redesignated Allied Land Forces South East Asia (ALFSEA), and NCAC was decisively placed under this formation. However, by the time the last phase of the Burma Campaign began in earnest, NCAC had become irrelevant, and it was dissolved in early 1945.

=== Training the Chinese Army ===
US Army China Combat Training Command

Ramgarh Training Center, in Bihar Province, India, an American-staffed, American-operated organisation, was established on 30 June 1942 by General Stilwell, the Commanding General, USAF, CBI, for the training of Chinese troops in India. The Supreme Commander, China Theater, General Chiang Kai-Shek, had approved Ramgarh Cantonment, as the site for a training center to train, equip, and reinforce the Chinese troops that had retreated into India from Burma.

The first Chinese troops arrived on 17 July 1942. There is a WWII cemetery for Chinese people, namely Ramgarh Chinese Cemetery.

Headquarters RTC and Hq Camp Ramgarh combined and CG RTC assumed command on 1 February 1943. (These two organizations and Hq Chinese Army in India were the three original command organizations at Ramgarh.) Headquarters Ramgarh Training Center was responsible for the training of Chinese Army in India, and Headquarters Chinese Army in India was responsible for the activation, organization, administration, and command of Chinese units.

=== U.S. Army and Allied Air Forces ===
After consultation among the Allied governments, Air Command South-East Asia was formed in November 1943 to control all Allied air forces in the theater, with Air Chief Marshal Sir Richard Peirse as Commander-in-Chief. Under Peirse's deputy, USAAF Major General George E. Stratemeyer, Eastern Air Command (EAC) was organized in 1943 to control Allied air operations in Burma, with headquarters in Calcutta. Unlike the strained relations and confusion with Allied ground force commands, air force operations in the CBI were relatively smooth. Relations improved even further after new U.S. military aid began arriving, together with capable USAAF officers such as Brigadier General William D. Old of CBI Troop Carrier Command, and Colonels Philip Cochran and John R. Alison of the 1st Air Commando Group. Within Eastern Air Command, Air Marshal Sir John Baldwin commanded the Third Tactical Air Force, originally formed to provide close air support to the Fourteenth Army. Baldwin was later succeeded by Air Marshal Sir Alec Coryton. U.S. Brigadier-General Howard C. Davidson and later Air Commodore F. J. W. Mellersh commanded the Strategic Air Force. In the new command, various units of the Royal Air Force and the U.S. Tenth Air Force worked side-by-side. In the autumn of 1943 SEAAC had 48 RAF and 17 USAAF squadrons; by the following May, the figures had risen to 64 and 28, respectively.

At Eastern Air Command, Gen. Stratemeyer had a status comparable to that of Stilwell. Coordinating the efforts of the various allied air components while maintaining relations with diverse command structures proved a daunting task. Part of Stratemeyer's command, the Tenth Air Force, had been integrated with the RAF Third Tactical Air Force in India in December 1943 and was tasked with a number of roles in support of a variety of allied forces. Another component, the US Fourteenth Air Force in China, was under the jurisdiction of Generalissimo Chiang Kai-shek as China theater commander. Although the India-China Division of the AAF's Air Transport Command received its tonnage allocations from Stratemeyer as Stilwell's deputy, ICD reported directly to Headquarters ATC in Washington, D.C.

In the spring of 1944, the arrival of Boeing B-29 Superfortresses in the theater, presaged a major offensive against Japan. XX Bomber Command of the Twentieth Air Force was tasked with the strategic bombing of Japan under Operation Matterhorn. It engaged in very-long-range Boeing B-29 Superfortress bombardment operations against Japan, Formosa, China, Indochina and Burma. It reported directly to the Joint Chiefs of Staff in Washington, D.C., and had no command relationship with any authority in India. However, XX Bomber Command remained totally dependent on Eastern Air Command for supplies, bases, ground staff, and infrastructure support.

The B-29 force included the 1st Photo Squadron, and the 58th Bombardment Wing at Chakulia, Kharagpur, with the 40th (Chakulia Airport), 444th, 462nd, and 468th Bombardment Groups.

While in India, XX BC was supported logistically by Tenth Air Force and the India-China Division, Air Transport Command. The B-29 groups moved to West Field, Tinian, in early 1945.

After a period of reshuffling, Eastern Air Command's air operations began to show results. In August 1944, Admiral Mountbatten said to a press conference that EAC fighter missions had practically swept the Japanese air force from Burmese skies. Between the formation of ACSEA in November 1943, and the middle of August 1944, American and British forces operating in Burma destroyed or damaged more than 700 Japanese aircraft with a further 100 aircraft probably destroyed. This achievement considerably reduced dangers to Air Transport Command cargo planes flying in support of the Hump airlift operation. By May 1944, EAC resupply missions in support of the Allied ground offensive had carried 70,000 tons of supplies and transported a total of 93,000 men, including 25,500 casualties evacuated from the battle areas. These figures did not include tonnage flown in the Hump airlift missions to China.

==== USAAF Order of Battle ====
Tenth Air Force

- 1st Air Commando Group (1944–1945)
  Burma, India (B-25, P-51, P-47, C-47)
- 1st Combat Cargo Group (1944–1945)
  Burma, India, China (C-47, C-46).
- 2nd Air Commando Group (1944–1945)
  Burma, India (P-51, C-47)
- 3d Combat Cargo Group (1944–1945)
  Burma, India (C-47).
- 4th Combat Cargo Group (1944–1945)
  Burma, India (C-47, C-46).
- 7th Bombardment Group (1942–1945)
  India (B-17, B-24).
- 12th Bombardment Group (1944–1945)
  India (B-25).
- 33d Fighter Group (1944–1945)
  India (P-38, P-47)
- 80th Fighter Group (1943–1945)
  India, Burma (P-38, P-40, P-47)

Transferred in 1944 to Fourteenth Air Force:

- 311th Fighter Group (1943–1944)
  India, Burma (A-36, P-51)
- 341st Bombardment Group (1943–1944)
  India, Burma (B-25)
- 443d Troop Carrier Group (1944–1945)
  India (C-47/C-53)
- 426th Night Fighter Squadron (1944)
  India (P-61)
- 427th Night Fighter Squadron (1944)
  India (P-61)

Fourteenth Air Force

- 68th Composite Wing
  - 23d Fighter Group (1942–1945) (P-40, P-51)
    Formerly American Volunteer Group (AVG) "Flying Tigers".
- 69th Composite Wing
  - 51st Fighter Group: 1942–1945 (P-40, P-38, P-51).
  - 341st Bombardment Group 1944–1945 (B-25).
- 312th Fighter Wing
  - 33rd Fighter Group: 1944 (P-38, P-47).
  - 81st Fighter Group: 1944–1945 (P-40, P-47).
  - 311th Fighter Group: 1944–1945 (A-36, P-51).
- Chinese-American Composite Wing (Provisional) (1943–1945)
  - 3rd Fighter Group (Provisional) (P-40, P-51)
  - 5th Fighter Group (Provisional) (P-40, P-51)
  - 1st Bombardment Group (Medium, Provisional) (B-25)
- Other assigned units:
  - 402d Fighter Group:
    May – July 1943. Assigned but never equipped.
  - 476th Fighter Group:
    May – July 1943. Assigned but never equipped.
  - 308th Bombardment Group:(B-24)
    March 1943 – February 1945
- From Tenth Air Force in 1944–1945:
  - 341st Bombardment Group: (B-25)
    January 1944 – November 1945
  - 443d Troop Carrier Group: (C-47/C-54)
    Aug – November 1945
  - 426th Night Fighter Squadron: P-61)
    1944 – 1945
  - 427th Night Fighter Squadron: (P-61)
    1944 – 1945

== Timeline ==
- Early 1942 Stilwell was promoted to lieutenant general and tasked with establishing the CBI.
- 25 February 1942 Stilwell arrived in India by which time Singapore and Burma had both been invaded by the Japanese Army.
- 10 March 1942 Stilwell is named Chief of Staff of Allied armies in the Chinese theatre of operations.
- 19 March 1942 Stilwell's command in China is extended to include the Chinese 5th and 6th Armies operating in Burma after Chiang Kai-shek gave his permission.
- 20 March 1942 Chinese troops under Stilwell engage Japanese forces along the Sittang River in Burma.
- 9 April 1942 Claire Chennault inducted into U.S. Army as a colonel, bringing the AVG Flying Tigers squadrons under Stilwell's nominal authority.
- 16 April 1942 7,000 British soldiers, and 500 prisoners and civilians were encircled by the Japanese 33rd Division at Yenangyaung.
- 19 April 1942 The 113th Regiment of the Chinese Expeditionary Force's New 38th Division led by General Sun Li-jen attacked and defeated the encircling Japanese troops rescuing the encircled British troops and civilians. This is historically called Battle of Yenangyaung.
- 2 May 1942 The commander of Allied forces in Burma, General Harold Alexander, ordered a general retreat to India. Stilwell left his Chinese troops and began the long evacuation with his personal staff (he called it a "walk out") to India.
- Most of the Chinese troops, who were supposed to be under Stilwell's command, were deserted in Burma without knowledge of the retreat. Under Chiang Kai-shek they made a hasty and disorganised retreat to India. Some of them tried to return to Yunnan through remote mountainous forests and out of these, at least half died.
- 24 May 1942 Stilwell arrived in Delhi.
- New Delhi and Ramgarh became the main training centre for Chinese troops in India. Chiang Kai-shek gave Stilwell command of what was left of the 22nd and 38th Divisions of the Chinese Army.
- 1 December 1942 British General Sir Archibald Wavell, as Commander-in-Chief, India, agreed with Stilwell to make the Ledo Road an American operation.
- August 1943 US creates a jungle commando unit, similar to the Chindits, to be commanded by Major General Frank Merrill; it is informally called "Merrill's Marauders".
- Exhaustion and disease led to the early evacuation of many Chinese and American troops before the coming assault on Myitkyina.
- 21 December Stilwell assumed direct control of operations to capture Myitkyina, having built up forces for an offensive in Northern Burma.
- 24 February 1944 Merrill's Marauders, attacked the Japanese 18th Division in Burma. This action enabled Stilwell to gain control of the Hakawing Valley.
- 17 May 1944 British general Slim in command of the Burma Campaign handed control of the Chindits to Stilwell.
- 17 May 1944 Chinese troops, with the help of Merrill's Marauders, captured Myitkina airfield.
- 3 August 1944 Myitkina fell to the Allies. The Marauders had advanced 750 miles and fought in five major engagements and 32 skirmishes with the Japanese Army. They lost 700 men, only 1,300 Marauders reached their objective and of these, 679 had to be hospitalized. This included General Merrill who had suffered a second-heart attack before going down with malaria.
- Some time before 27 August 1944, Mountbatten supreme allied commander (SEAC) ordered General Stilwell to evacuate all the wounded Chindits.
- During 1944 the Japanese in Operation Ichi-Go overran US air bases in eastern China. Chiang Kai-shek blamed Stilwell for the Japanese success, and pressed the US high command to recall him.
- October 1944 Roosevelt recalled Stilwell, whose role was split (as was the CBI):
  - Lieutenant General Raymond Wheeler became Deputy Supreme Allied Commander South East Asia.
  - Major General Albert Wedemeyer became Chief of Staff to Chiang Kai-shek and commander of the U.S. Forces, China Theater (USFCT).
  - Lieutenant General Daniel Sultan was promoted from deputy commander to become commander of US Forces India-Burma Theater (USFIBT) and commander of the Northern Combat Area Command
- 12 January 1945, the first convoy over the Ledo Road of 113 vehicles led by General Pick from Ledo reached Kunming, China on 4 February 1945. Over the next seven months 35,000 tons of supplies in 5,000 vehicles were carried along it.

== See also ==
- India-China Division
- Burma campaign
- Philip Cochran
- The Dixie Mission
- U.S. campaigns in World War II – China Burma India Theater
- OSS Detachment 101
- Charles N. Hunter
- Chinese Expeditionary Force (Burma)
