= Thomas Elsdon =

British flying ace of the Second World War

- Born: 22 January 1917; Dundee, Scotland
- Died: 9 September 2003 (aged 86)
- Military career
- Allegiance: United Kingdom
- Branch: Royal Air Force
- Service years: 1937–1959
- Rank: Group Captain
- Unit: No. 72 Squadron
- Commands: No. 136 Squadron (1941–1942); No. 165 Wing (1942, 1943–1944); No. 293 Wing (1942–1943); No. 169 Wing (1943); No. 185 Wing (1943); RAF Boreham (1945)
- Conflicts: Second World War: Battle of France; Battle of Britain; Burma campaign
- Awards: Officer of the Order of the British Empire; Distinguished Flying Cross; Mention in Despatches (2)

Thomas Elsdon OBE, DFC (22 January 1917 – 9 September 2003) was a British flying ace of the Royal Air Force (RAF) during the Second World War. He was credited with at least nine aerial victories.

From Dundee, Elsdon was a graduate of the RAF's Cranwell College and was serving with No. 72 Squadron at the time of the outbreak of the Second World War. He claimed early aerial victories flying operations over England in 1939 and more followed in the Battle of Britain. Wounded on 7 September he did not return to operations until July 1941. After briefly participating in the Circus offensive, he was given command of No. 136 Squadron and led it to Burma and the campaign against Japanese there. From September 1942 to July 1944, he commanded a series of fighter wings and after a brief period as a staff officer in Calcutta was repatriated to England. When the war ended he was commander of RAF Boreham. He remained in the RAF until his retirement from the service in October 1959 as a group captain. He died in 2003, aged 86.

== Early life ==
Thomas Arthur Francis Elsdon was born on 22 January 1917 in Dundee, Scotland. He was educated in Norwich, at Unthank College, and then in January 1936 entered the Royal Air Force's Cranwell College as a flight cadet. He was commissioned as a pilot officer in December 1937 and posted to No. 72 Squadron. This was equipped with Gloster Gladiator fighters and based at Church Fenton. In April 1939, the squadron began converting to the Supermarine Spitfire fighter.

== Second World War ==
On the outbreak of the Second World War in September 1939 Elsdon was still serving with No. 72 Squadron but in the rank of flying officer, having been promoted the previous June. At this time, the squadron was based at Leconfield, in Yorkshire, from where it was engaged on patrols covering shipping in the area. He was involved in one of the RAF's earliest fighter engagements over the United Kingdom, when his section was scrambled on 21 October to intercept a group of Luftwaffe aircraft. He and another pilot, Desmond Sheen, engaged what they identified as Heinkel He 115 floatplanes off the coast of Yorkshire, and shot down one each.

On 7 December, Elsdon's section was again involved in an interception of Luftwaffe aircraft, this time several Heinkel He 111 medium bombers, along with pilots from No. 603 Squadron. He exhausted his ammunition in the ensuing engagement, to the north of Arbroath, and his Spitfire was damaged. On analysis of the claims made after the engagement, RAF intelligence officers eventually attributed Elsdon with a share in two destroyed He 111s. He was subsequently mentioned in despatches on 20 February 1940 for "gallant and distinguished services".

No. 72 Squadron moved to Acklington in March, where it continued with shipping patrols. In early June it briefly operated from Gravesend, flying patrols over the beaches at Dunkirk from where the British Expeditionary Force was being evacuated. During this time, Elsdon shot down a Junkers Ju 87 dive bomber to the southeast of Dunkirk on 2 June, although this was unable to be unconfirmed. With the squadron back at Acklington, Elsdon's next aerial victory was on 15 August, when he destroyed a Messerschmitt Bf 110 heavy fighter 30 miles (48 km) to the east of the Farne Islands.

=== Battle of Britain ===
In late August, No. 72 Squadron moved to Biggin Hill, just as the Luftwaffe escalated its operations against southern England. Elsdon destroyed a pair of Bf 110s to the southeast of Croydon on 1 September, and three days later, repeated this success, with two more Bf 110s shot down near Tunbridge Wells. Elsdon, who had been promoted to flight lieutenant the previous day, was subsequently shot down, parachuting out of his aircraft after that engagement. On 7 September, the Luftwaffe mounted large raids on London and No. 72 Squadron was one of the units scrambled in the late afternoon to intercept a raid involving over 300 bombers and in excess of 600 fighters. Elsdon succeeded in the shooting down of a Messerschmitt Bf 109 fighter in the vicinity of Maidstone but his Spitfire was then attacked and he received serious shoulder and leg wounds. He made a forced landing at Biggin Hill. He was treated at Farnborough Hospital, but his wounds ended his involvement in the Battle of Britain. It is possible that his attacker was the German ace Herbert Ihlefeld. During his recuperation, he was awarded the Distinguished Flying Cross in recognition of his successes of the previous weeks. The citation for his DFC, published in The London Gazette, read:

Since 31st August, 1940, this officer has destroyed six enemy aircraft, bringing his total to eight. On 4th September, 1940, when leading his squadron, his method of attack was successful in destroying nine enemy aircraft and probably three more. A few days later, he brought down the leading aircraft of a bomber formation. His record is outstanding and he has led his section and flight with distinction, showing complete disregard of danger and personal injury.

— The London Gazette, No. 34964, 8 October 1940.

=== Circus offensive ===
Elsdon's recovery from his wounds took several months and it was not until July 1941 that he received his next operational posting. This was to No. 257 Squadron. His new unit, based at Coltishall, was equipped with Hawker Hurricane fighters and engaged both in offensive operations over the North Sea towards the Dutch coast and night fighter duties. On 24 July Elsdon damaged a Bf 109 near Mardyck, although he received minor wounds to his arm during the sortie, escorting Bristol Blenheim light bombers attacking railway facilities at Hazebrouck as part of the RAF's Circus offensive. On returning to England, he made a crash landing at Hawkinge.

=== Burma campaign ===
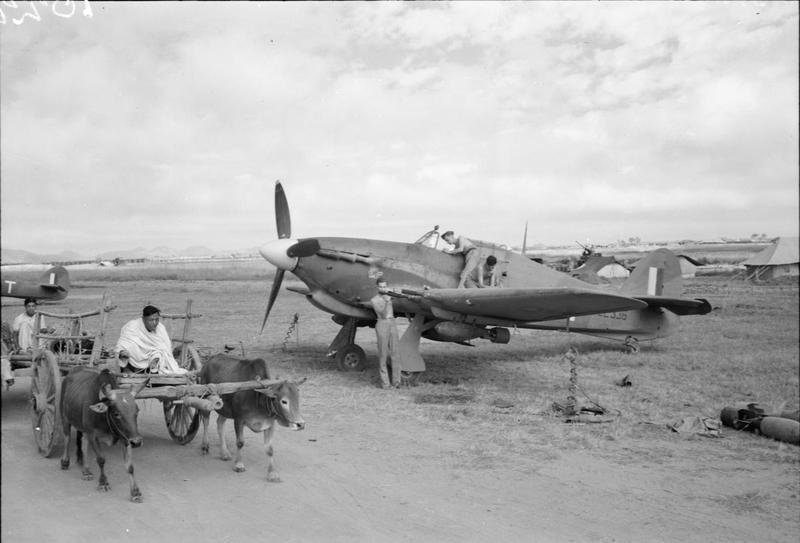
A Hawker Hurricane at an airfield in Burma

In August Elsdon was appointed commander of No. 136 Squadron. This was in the process of being formed at Kirton-in-Lindsey and, equipped with Hurricanes, became operational in September when it commenced shipping patrols along the East Coast. In November, the squadron was embarked for the Middle East but while in transit, the Japanese declared war and advanced into Burma. No. 136 Squadron was diverted to India but one flight, with Elsdon in charge, was detached to collect Hurricanes from Cairo and fly them onto Rangoon. From 23 January 1942, the flight, which had been reduced to four aircraft through attrition during the delivery flight from Cairo, was attached to No. 67 Squadron at Mingaladon and flew its first sortie the same day. It was heavily engaged during the early stages of the Burma campaign but eventually rejoined the rest of the squadron at Alipore near Calcutta in April.

Elsdon, who had been promoted to temporary squadron leader the previous December, damaged a Kawanishi H8K flying boat over the Bay of Bengal on 21 August. The following month he was appointed wing leader of No. 165 Wing, based at Dum Dum, and over the next twelve months commanded a series of wings in Southeast Asia: No. 293 Wing from October to February 1943, No. 169 Wing until October and then No. 185 Wing until November. At that time, he returned to No. 165 Wing, which he commanded during its service in the Arakan, including the campaigns in the region in early 1944.

=== Later war service ===
In July 1944 Elsdon was rested from operations with a posting to the staff at the headquarters of Eastern Air Command in Calcutta. Two months later he was repatriated to the United Kingdom. He was mentioned in despatches for a second time on 1 January 1945. The final months of his war service was spent serving with Transport Command and, in April, he was appointed the commanding officer of the RAF station at Boreham.

By the end of the war, Elsdon was credited with having destroyed nine aircraft, two of which were shared with other pilots, plus a tenth that was unconfirmed. He also claimed two aircraft as damaged.

== Postwar service ==
Elsdon, who remained in RAF service after the war in Europe as an acting wing commander, was appointed an Officer in the Order of the British Empire in the 1945 King's Birthday Honours. His substantive rank was made up to wing commander on 1 January 1949. He eventually ended his service the RAF on 22 October 1959 as a group captain, while retaining the substantive rank of wing commander.

== Later life ==
Having retired to Cambridgeshire, Elsdon died on 9 September 2003 at the age of 86. He was predeceased by at least one son, Nigel Elsdon, who was a pilot flying a Panavia Tornado jet fighter when he was killed in action in 1991 during the First Gulf War. His daughter served with the RAF as a nurse during the Falklands War.
