= Third Tactical Air Force =

- SEAC Aircraft Roundel
- Country: United Kingdom
- Branch: Royal Air Force

The Third Tactical Air Force (Third TAF), which was formed in South Asia in December 1943, was one of three tactical air forces formed by the Royal Air Force (RAF) during the Second World War. It was made up of squadrons and personnel from the RAF, Indian Air Force (IAF) and the air forces of other Commonwealth countries. Third TAF was formed shortly after the establishment of South East Asia Command to provide close air support to the Fourteenth Army.

It was first formed on 19 December 1943 designated the Tactical Air Force (Burma) and renamed as the Third TAF on 28 December 1943. Along with parts of the USAAF Tenth Air Force, it was subordinate to Joint Allied Eastern Air Command which was also formed in December 1943.

As the Air Force was formed, it was felt that at last British forces could go over to the offensive against the Japanese in the Burma Campaign. A start was made towards establishing a general offensive in Arakan in early 1943, but this was forestalled by a Japanese offensive. The Japanese were decisively beaten, but they shifted the focus of their attack to central Burma. Third TAF gave sterling service to Fourteenth Army during the Battle of Kohima and the Battle of Imphal, strafing and bombing the besieging Japanese troops, often at very low level.

After the defeat of the Japanese by IV Corps and XXXIII Corps in Assam, the monsoon intervened before many counterattacks could take place. After the enforced period of reduced operations, the Third TAF supported the advance of Fourteenth Army against the Japanese forces. However, command arrangement changes at the end of 1944 cutting short the life of the Third TAF. It was redesignated HQ RAF Bengal and Burma on 4 December 1944.

The Third TAF had two commanders, Air Marshal John Baldwin up until 15 August 1944, and then Air Marshal Sir Alec Coryton.

== Composition ==
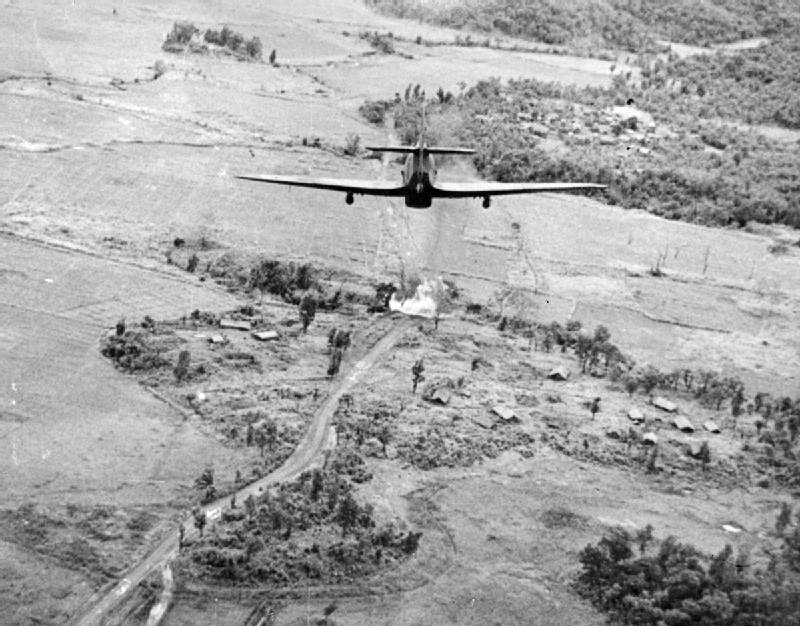
A Hawker Hurricane Mark Mk.IIC of No. 42 Squadron RAF based at Kangla, Burma, diving to attack a bridge near a small Burmese settlement on the Tiddim Road

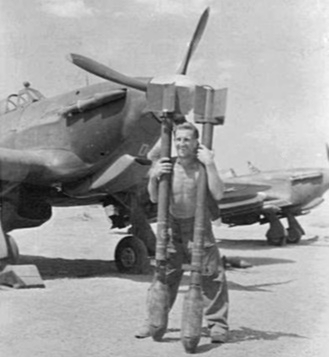
Sergeant Albert (Tinny) Martin, Royal New Zealand Air Force (RNZAF) of Wellington, New Zealand, of No. 20 Squadron, RAF, at Monywa, Central Burma, 17/18 March 1945

The Third TAF was made up of several groups:

No. 221 Group RAF supporting IV Corps.

During the battle of Imphal there were seldom more than seven squadrons engaged at one time but over the three months' of the siege altogether 21 squadrons took part: including three from the Indian Air Force (Nos. 1, 2, 7 and 9). The RAF squadrons were Nos. 5, 11, 20, 28, 34, 42, 60, 81, 82, 84, 110, 113, 123, 136, 152, 176, No. 607 and No. 615.

No. 222 Group RAF

No 222 (General Reconnaissance) Group was based in Ceylon. The group role was, amongst others, reconnaissance over the Bay of Bengal. The RAF squadrons were at one time Nos. 8, 17, 22, 81, 89, 132, 135, 160, 191, 203, 205, 212, 217, 230, 240, 273, 292, 321 and 413.

No. 223 Group RAF with 151 Squadron (formerly 151 Operational Training Unit)

No. 224 Group RAF (commanding officer Air Commodore Alexander Gray) supporting the Indian XV Corps. In the 1943–44 campaigning season, this group comprised:

Three RAF fighter squadrons equipped with Supermarine Spitfires (this campaign marked the first time Spitfires were being used in South-East Asia)

Six fighter-bomber squadrons with Hawker Hurricanes (mainly Mk.IIc variants) including, No. 3 Squadron IAF and No. 4 Squadron IAF

One tactical reconnaissance squadron No. 6 Squadron IAF equipped with the Hurricane Mk.IIb

Two light bomber squadrons (one of which was No. 8 Squadron IAF commanded by Squadron-Leader Niranjan Prasa), equipped with Vultee Vengeances.

No. 226 Group RAF

226 group was one of the fighter groups based in Singapore. After the fall of Singapore the number of the group was transferred to the maintenance unit (No. 1301 MU RAF) of the tactical air force.

No. 227 Group RAF

227 group, based in Bombay, was the RAF training group based in India for the training of Indian pilots.

No. 229 Group RAF

229 Group was the transport part of the Tactical air force. The RAF squadrons were at one time Nos. 31, 52, 62, 96, 117, 194, 216, 232, 238, 267, 353, 435, 436, 668, 669, 670, 671 and 673.

No. 231 Group RAF

The role of the group was to provide heavy bombers for the campaign in Burma. The RAF bomber squadrons were at one time Nos. 99, 159, 200, No. 215, 355, 356, 357 and 358.

== Squadrons ==
Squadrons of the 3rd Tactical Air Force
Squadron	Group	Date joined	Date left	Notes
No. 1 Squadron IAF	221			Fought in the battle of Imphal. Hawker Hurricane IIc.
No. 2 Squadron IAF	221			Fought in the battle of Imphal. Hawker Hurricane IIc.
No. 3 Squadron IAF	224			Fought in the battle of Imphal. Hawker Hurricane IIc.
No. 4 Squadron IAF	224			Fought in the battle of Imphal. Hawker Hurricane IIc.
No. 6 Squadron IAF	224			Hawker Hurricane FR.IIb specialist reconnaissance to support the Fourteenth Army on this front, earning the name "The Eyes of the Fourteenth Army"
No. 7 Squadron IAF	221			Fought in the battle of Imphal. Vultee Vengeance and later Hawker Hurricane IIc.
No. 8 Squadron IAF	224			Vultee Vengeance and later Spitfire.
No. 9 Squadron IAF	221			Fought in the battle of Imphal. Hawker Hurricane IIc
No. 5 Squadron RAF	221			in 1942 they received American-built Curtiss Mohawks and became escorts to Bristol Blenheim light bombers over north west Burma. These were replaced in turn by Hawker Hurricanes and later American-supplied Republic P-47 Thunderbolts. Fought in the battle of Imphal.
No. 11 Squadron RAF	221			Fought in the battle of Imphal. Hawker Hurricane IIc.
No. 20 Squadron RAF	221			Fought in the battle of Imphal. Hawker Hurricane Mk.IIC
No. 22 Squadron RAF	222			Equipped with Bristol Beaufighters, undertook anti-shipping rocket attacks. Squadron disbanded a month after the Japanese surrender.
No. 28 Squadron RAF	221			Flew the Westland Lysander army cooperation aircraft and from December 1942 the Hawker Hurricane fighter-bomber. By 1943 the squadron was operating in Burma until 1945 when it started to re-equip with the Supermarine Spitfire. Fought in the battle of Imphal.
No. 34 Squadron RAF	221			Flew Blenheim IVs. These carried out bombing raids on Japanese bases in Burma until April 1943. The Squadron converted to Hawker Hurricanes and then began fighter-bomber operations from November. It switched to Thunderbolts in March 1945. Fought in the battle of Imphal
No. 42 Squadron RAF	221			Fought in the battle of Imphal. Hawker Hurricane Mk.IIC
No. 60 Squadron RAF	221			Blenheim Mk IV then re-equipped with Hawker Hurricane MK II and in May 1945 with Republic Thunderbolts. Fought in the battle of Imphal.
No. 81 Squadron RAF	221			Arrived at Alipore, India in December 1943, equipped with more modern Spitfire Mk VIII, starting operations in January. It flew fighter and ground attack missions in support of the Second Battle of Arakan and fought in the battle of Imphal.
No. 82 Squadron RAF	221			Flew the Vultee Vengeance then the squadron was re-equipped with de Havilland Mosquitoes bombers in July 1944. Fought in the battle of Imphal
No. 84 Squadron RAF	221			Flew the Vultee Vengeance then the squadron re-equipped with the Mosquito in February 1945. Fought in the battle of Imphal.
No. 110 Squadron RAF	221			Flew the Vultee Vengeance then the squadron re-equipped with the DH Mosquito. Fought in the battle of Imphal.
No. 113 Squadron RAF	221			Bristol Blenheim Mk IV and then converted to Hurricanes in March 1943. These were used for ground-attack duties being replaced by Thunderbolts in April 1945. Fought in the battle of Imphal
No. 123 Squadron RAF	221			Flew Hurricanes into 1944 when it was moved again to India in the Chittagong area until June 1944 it re-equipped with the Thunderbolt. Fought in the battle of Imphal.
No. 136 Squadron RAF	221			Flew Hurricanes till October 1943 and then Spitfires. Fought in the battle of Imphal
No. 152 Squadron RAF	221	19 December 1943	Duration	Fought in the battle of Imphal, operated Spitfires from front-line strips and supported the Fourteenth Army during its final conquest of Burma.
No. 176 Squadron RAF	221			Equipped with Beaufighters and Hurricanes to provide night defence for Calcutta. Detachments of the squadron were then based at Chittagong Burma, Ratmalana Ceylon, Baigachi and Mingaladon where the Beaufighters were replaced with Mosquitoes in June 1945. Fought in the battle of Imphal.
No. 177 Squadron RAF	224			Equipped with Beaufighters, twin-engined, long range, ground attack fighters. Canadians formed a significant percentage of the pilots. During its two year of operations in Burma, it destroyed or damaged 266 locomotives and trains, 673 vehicles, river and ocean-going vessels and nine aircraft on the ground.
No. 211 Squadron RAF		8 January 1944	Duration	Bristol Beaufighter X (October 1943 to May 1945), de Havilland Mosquito FB VI (June 1945 to March 1946)
No. 607 Squadron RAF	221			Flew Hurricanes and then Spitfires. Fought in the battle of Imphal.
No. 615 Squadron RAF	221			flew Spitfires and was re-equipped with Republic Thunderbolts when the squadron was renumbered to No. 615 squadron on that same day and began training for the invasion of Malaya. Fought in the battle of Imphal.
No. 684 Squadron RAF	231			Photo-reconnaissance unit, it was disbanded on 1 September 1946 at RAF Seletar, Singapore by being renumbered to No. 81 Squadron RAF.

A Third TAF Communications Squadron was established on 28 December 1943, but disestablished on 4 December 1944 at RAF Comilla.

== Postwar in Burma ==
- HQ RAF Bengal and Burma was formed on 4 December 1944 by renaming the 3rd Tactical Air Force, still under Air Marshal Sir Alec Coryton.
- HQ RAF Bengal and Burma was renamed HQ RAF Burma on 27 February 1945.
- Renamed Air Headquarters Burma on 1 June 1945. Air Marshal Sir Hugh Saunders became Air Marshal Commanding from 1 August 1945.

Burma was relatively straightforward to deal with, although more complicated than Siam. Much of the colony had been conquered several months before the war ended, in the big British offensive of summer 1945. That gave Air Command, South East Asia, crucial breathing space to start getting the colony back on its feet before the massive increase in occupation duties postwar occurred. At the end of the war, it had 28 squadrons under its control. This quickly reduced as the demobilisation really kicked in. Again, the transport squadrons saw the largest amount of work, evacuating prisoners of war and internees and supplying garrisons and the civilian population. Second to the transport squadrons in workload were the photo reconnaissance aircraft. The opportunity was taken to complete the process of surveying SE Asia from the air, and using the survey to bring maps up to date. The survey was not completed until August 1947.

A light transport and liaison squadron, Air Headquarters Burma Communication Squadron, was established on 20 September 1945 at Baigachi, but disbanded within two months, on 14 November 1945 at RAF Mingaladon (now Yangon International Airport), by being downgraded to Air Headquarters Burma Communication Flight RAF.

After the clean-up immediately postwar, came the task of preparing Burma for independence. AHQ Burma moved out of Rangoon to Mingaladon on 1 January 1947. The Burmese Air Force was established on 16 January 1947 with former British aircraft. AHQ Burma was disbanded on 31 December 1947, and three months later Burma became independent.

== See also ==
- RAF First Tactical Air Force
- RAF Second Tactical Air Force
- List of Royal Air Force commands
