= RAF Dum Dum =

Former Royal Air Force station

RAF Dum Dum
- Dum Dum, Kolkata in India

Site information
- Owner: Air Ministry
- Operator: Royal Air Force
- Controlled by: Air Command, South East Asia

Location
- Shown within India
- Coordinates: 22°38′59″N 088°26′40″E

Site history
- Built: 1941
- In use: 1941 - 1946
- Battles/wars: South West Pacific theatre of World War II

Royal Air Force Dum Dum or more simply RAF Dum Dum is a former Royal Air Force station located in Dum Dum, Kolkata, India.

== History ==
RAF Dum Dum was established as an airfield before the Second World War begun, and acted as a strategic base from 1941 onwards.

In December 1941, RAF Dum Dum participated in the defense of Calcutta when the Japanese air-raids threatened the city. The station also became a key base for several RAF squadrons, which involved in airlift operations to China, famously known as “the Hump”. It also supported supply-dropping missions to support British and Allied troops, including the Chindits in Burma.

=== Burma Campaign ===
In 1942, as the Japanese occupation of Burma intensified, RAF Dum Dum was an important location for supply and transport missions. Squadrons based here would ferry supplies to Allied forces across the region, often taking risky routes through mountainous terrain.

During the 1943 Burma Campaign, RAF Dum Dum supplied troops and mules to support the Chindits’ guerrilla warfare tactics deep in the jungle. On 14 January 1943, a Night fighter squadron was formed and attempted a raid on the next day, however, the raid was foiled. On February, the Night fighter squadron moved out. After the fall of Burma, the airfield engaged in re-establishing supply lines over routes in the Himalayan towards China.

=== Squadrons ===
Units that were based here at some point:

- No. 5 Squadron RAF between 15 December 1941 and 5 May 1942 with the Hawker Audax and the Curtiss Mohawk IV.
- Detachments from No. 28 Squadron RAF between 3 March 1939 and 31 January 1942 with Audax and between 7 April and 18 July 1942 with the Westland Lysander II
- No. 31 Squadron RAF between March and April 1942 with the Douglas DC-2
- No. 45 Squadron RAF between 30 April and 16 August 1942 with the Bristol Blenheim IV
- No. 52 Squadron RAF between 1 July 1944 and 30 October 1946 with the Douglas Dakota and the Consolidated Liberator I
- Detachments from No. 60 Squadron RAF between March 1930 and September 1940 with the Westland Wapiti and Blenheim I
- No. 62 Squadron RAF between 30 April and 14 June 1942 with the Lockheed Hudson III and as a detachment between September 1946 and March 1947 with the Dakota
- Detachment from No. 113 Squadron RAF between April and October 1942 with the Blenheim IV
- No. 135 Squadron RAF between 27 March 1942 and 23 January 1943 with Hawker Hurricane IIB
- No. 136 Squadron RAF between 26/27 February 1942 and between 6 September and 26 December 1942
- No. 139 Squadron RAF between March and April 1942 with the Hudson III
- No. 146 Squadron RAF between 26 November and 2 December 1941 with the Audax and between 5 May and 6 September 1942 with the Mohawk IV, Brewster Buffalo I and Hurricane IIB
- No. 176 Squadron RAF between 15 January and 6 February 1943 with Bristol Beaufighter IF
- Detachment from No. 194 Squadron RAF between October 1942 and February 1943 with the Hudson VI
- Detachment from No. 215 Squadron RAF between April and August 1942 with the Vickers Wellington IC
- Detachment from No. 258 Squadron RAF between March 1942 and February 1943 with the Hurricane IIB
- No. 353 Squadron RAF between 1 June and 1 August 1942, then between August 1942 and February 1943 as a detachment with the Hudson III
- Detachments from No. 357 Squadron RAF during February 1944 with the Liberator III then again between October 1944 and January 1945 with the Dakota
- No. 681 Squadron RAF initially between 15 January and 9 December 1943 with the Hurricane IIC, North American Mitchell II, Spitfire IV/XI and de Havilland Mosquito II then again between 30 January and 5 May 1944 with the Spitfire IV & XI
- No. 684 Squadron RAF initially between 29 September and 9 December 1943 with the Mitchell II and Mosquito VI then again between 31 January and 5 May 1944

=== Re-development ===
After the Second World War, the airfield was redeveloped into Netaji Subhas Chandra Bose International Airport.
