= No. 353 Squadron RAF =

Defunct flying squadron of the Royal Air Force

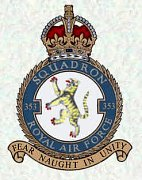
- Official Squadron crest for no. 353 Squadron RAF
- Active: 1 June 1942 – 1 October 1946
- Country: United Kingdom
- Branch: Royal Air Force
- Part of: No. 221 Group RAF, Air Command, South East Asia; No. 229 Group RAF, ACSEA
- Motto: Fear naught in unity

Insignia
- Squadron Badge heraldry: A Bengal Tiger rampant
- Squadron Codes: No identity markings are known to have been carried

No. 353 Squadron RAF was a Royal Air Force squadron, active during World War II carrying out maritime patrol and transport tasks in and around British India.

== History ==
No. 353 Squadron was formed on 1 June 1942 at RAF Dum Dum, British India from No. 62 Squadron and 103 (Coast Defence) Flight, Indian Air Force. Equipped with the Lockheed Hudson, an American light bomber and coastal reconnaissance aircraft. The squadron was tasked with coastal patrols over the Bay of Bengal. In August 1943 it moved to Palam and was assigned to transport duties. From 1944 onwards the squadron re-equipped with Douglas Dakota, an American military transport aircraft and also operated a number of Avro Ansons, a British twin-engine multi-role aircraft, which were replaced with Beech Expeditor twin-engine light aircraft in January 1945. The squadron became fully Dakota equipped by April 1945, but disbanded at RAF Mauripur on 1 October 1946.

== Aircraft operated ==
Aircraft operated by No. 353 Squadron
From	To	Aircraft	Version
June 1942	October 1944	Lockheed Hudson	Mk.III
October 1944	October 1944	Lockheed Hudson	Mk.VI
April 1944	September 1945	Douglas Dakota	Mk.I
April 1944	October 1946	Douglas Dakota	Mks.III, IV
August 1944	January 1945	Avro Anson	Mks.I, X, XII
November 1944	March 1945	Vickers Warwick	Mk.III
January 1945	July 1945	Beechcraft Expeditor	Mk.II

== Squadron bases ==
Bases and airfields used by No. 353 Squadron
From	To	Base	Remark
1 June 1942	24 February 1943	RAF Dum Dum, Bengal	Det. at RAF Cuttack, Orissa
24 February 1943	2 April 1943	RAF Dhubalia, Bengal	Det. at RAF Jessore, Bengal
2 April 1943	24 August 1943	RAF Tanjore, Thanjavur, Tamil Nadu	Det. at St Thomas Mount, Madras, Tamil Nadu
24 August 1943	1 May 1946	RAF Palam, Delhi	Dets. at Dum Dum (renumbered to 52 Squadron on 1 July 1944) and Jiwani, Balochistan
1 May 1946	1 October 1946	RAF Mauripur, Sindh	Disbanded here

== Commanding officers ==
Officers commanding No. 353 Squadron
From	To	Name
1 June 1942	1 July 1944	W/Cdr. L.G.W. Lilly
1 July 1944	February 1945	W/Cdr. C.E. Slee, MVO, AFC
February 1945	March 1945	S/Ldr. F.M. Biddulph
March 1945	October 1945	W/cdr. A.M. Harding, DFC
October 1945	1 October 1946	W/Cdr. P.B. Wood
