= Ranchi Hazaribagh Expressway =

Road in Jharkhand, India

Ranchi - Hazaribagh Expressway
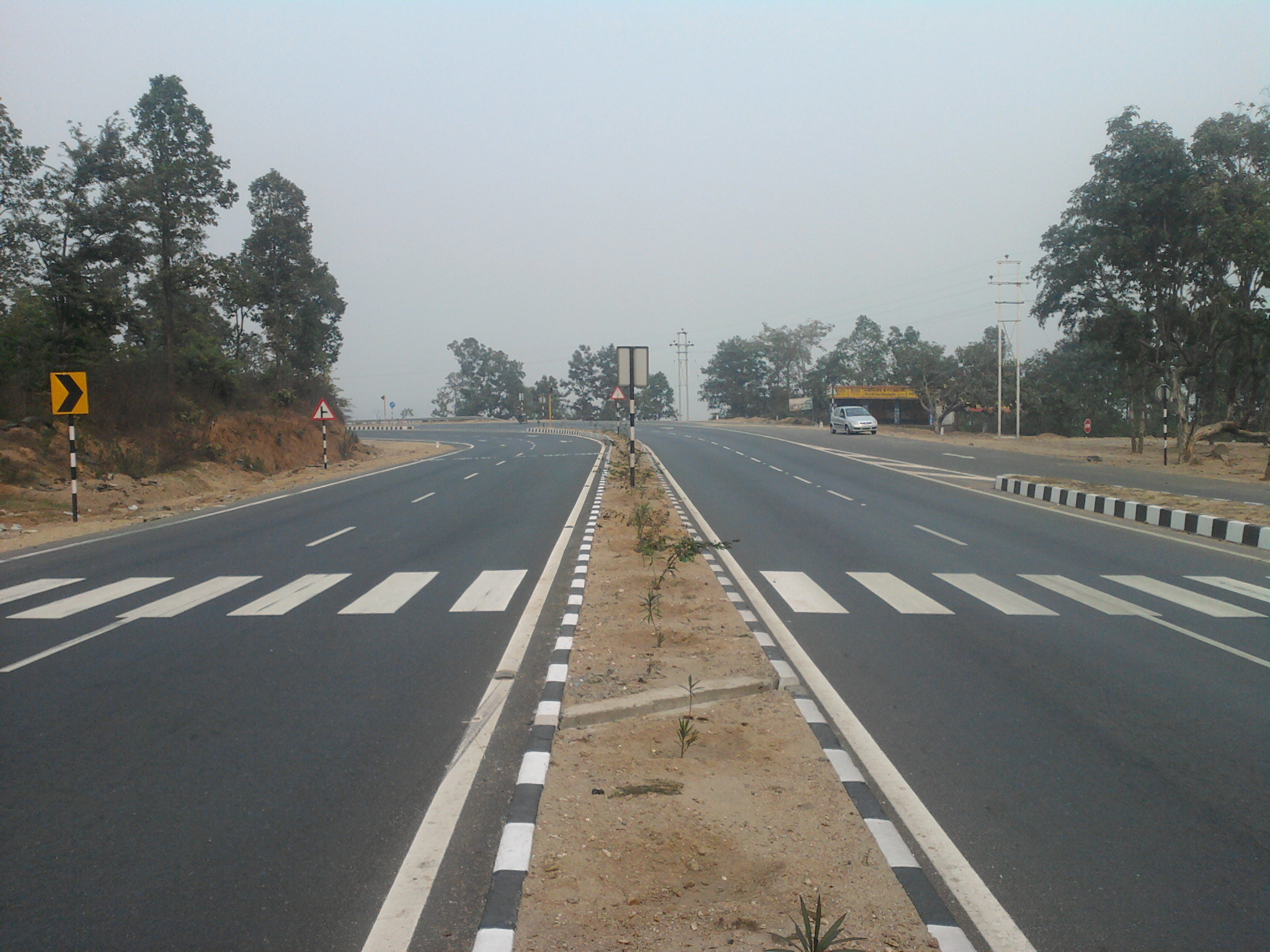

Route information
- Length: 100 km (62 mi)

Major junctions
- South end: Ranchi Outer Ring Road Expressway, Irba, Ranchi
- North end: Hazaribagh Bypass, NH-33, Hazaribagh

Location
- Country: India
- State: Jharkhand
- Major cities: Ranchi, Ramgarh Cantonment, Hazaribagh

Highway system
- Roads in India; Expressways; National; State; Asian; State Highways in Jharkhand

Jamshedpur-Ranchi-Hazaribagh-Barhi Highway is a four-lane state highway in Jharkhand constructed on NH 20, NH 43 and Ranchi Ring Road. It was started constructing in 2009 and completed in 2012. It connects Ranchi, capital of Jharkhand, to Hazaribagh in Jharkhand. It is extended up to Ranchi - Jamshedpur Expressway in Jharkhand and Barhi in Jharkhand in 2020 and giving it a length of 231 km. A ten km four-lane bypass has been constructed near Hazaribagh and a 40 km six-lane bypass near Ranchi to decrease the pressure of Traffic in both the cities. It is proposed to be extended to Koderma till 2022.

== See also ==
- Expressways of India
- National highways of India
- List of national highways in India
- Indian Railways
- List of airports in India
- Transport in India
