= Desmond Sheen =

Australian flying ace of the Second World War

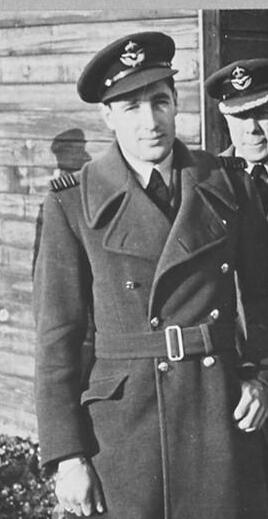
- Born: 2 October 1917; Sydney, Australia
- Died: June 2001 (aged 83)
- Military career
- Allegiance: Australia
- Branch: Royal Australian Air Force; Royal Air Force
- Service years: 1936 (RAAF); 1937–1946, 1950–1971 (RAF)
- Rank: Group Captain
- Commands: No. 72 Squadron; RAF Manston; RAF Skeabrae; RAF Drem; No. 148 Wing; No. 502 Squadron
- Conflicts: Second World War: Battle of France; Battle of Britain; Circus offensive
- Awards: Distinguished Flying Cross and Bar

Desmond Sheen DFC & Bar (2 October 1917 – June 2001) was an Australian flying ace of the Royal Air Force (RAF) during the Second World War. He was credited with at least five aerial victories.

From Sydney, Sheen joined the Royal Australian Air Force in 1936 and transferred to the RAF the following year. He was serving with No. 72 Squadron at the time of the outbreak of the Second World War. He claimed early aerial victories flying operations over England in 1939 and more followed in the Battle of Britain. Wounded on 5 September he did not return to operations until mid-October. He commanded No. 72 Squadron from April to October 1941 during its service in the Circus offensive. Much of the remainder of his war service was spent as commander of various RAF stations around the United Kingdom. He was a staff officer at RAF headquarters in the Middle East when the war ended. He returned to civilian life for a few years but rejoined the RAF in 1950, serving until his retirement in January 1971 as a group captain. Subsequently employed in the aviation industry, he died in 2001, aged 83.

== Early life ==
Desmond Frederick Burt Sheen was born on 2 October 1917 in Sydney, New South Wales, Australia, but was raised in Canberra. He went to Mortdale Public School and then Telopea Park School and then worked as a clerk in the public service. In January 1936, he enlisted in the Royal Australian Air Force as an air cadet. His flying training was conducted at Point Cook. The following year, he transferred to the Royal Air Force (RAF) on a short service commission. Arriving in the United Kingdom in February, he received further training at No. 9 Flying Training School at Thornaby. He was commissioned as a pilot officer in June 1937 and posted to No. 72 Sqadron. This was equipped with Gloster Gladiator fighters and based at Church Fenton. In April 1939, the squadron began converting to the Supermarine Spitfire fighter. By this time Sheen was a flying officer, having been promoted to this rank the previous September.

== Second World War ==
On the outbreak of the Second World War in September 1939 Sheen was still serving with No. 72 Squadron. At this time, the squadron was based at Leconfield, in Yorkshire, from where it was engaged on patrols covering shipping in the area. He was involved in one of the RAF's earliest fighter engagements over the United Kingdom, when his section was scrambled on 21 October to intercept a group of Luftwaffe aircraft. He and another pilot, Thomas Elsdon, engaged what they identified as Heinkel He 115 floatplanes off the coast of Yorkshire, and shot down one each.

On 7 December, Sheen's section was again involved in an interception of Luftwaffe aircraft, this time several Heinkel He 111 medium bombers, along with pilots from No. 603 Squadron. He shared in the destruction of a He 111 but he was wounded in the leg, and his Spitfire damaged, in the ensuing engagement, to the north of Arbroath. Landing his Spitfire at Leuchars, Sheen's wounds were treated at Edinburgh Hospital. He returned to operations in January 1940. No. 72 Squadron moved to Acklington in March, where it continued with shipping patrols and interception duties although with little success.

The next month Sheen was posted to No. 212 Squadron, a Photographic Development Unit based at Heston. He was part of a detachment of the squadron that was sent to France to carry out sorties from Le Luc, in the south of the country. He regularly flew high altitude reconnaissance sorties over Germany and Italy in unarmed Spitfires. During this time he was awarded the Distinguished Flying Cross, which was gazetted on 7 May. In June, the detachment's airfield was bombed and its personnel evacuated, initially to North Africa and then Gibraltar. They eventually arrived back at Heston in the United Kingdom on 12 July. Sheen remained with the squadron for a further two weeks before being posted back to No. 72 Squadron.

=== Battle of Britain ===
On 15 August, the Luftwaffe mounted a large bombing raid targeting No. 13 Group's sector, which included Acklington. No. 72 Squadron was called upon to intercept about what was believed to be about 30 aircraft approaching Tynemouth but turned out to be near 100, including an escort of around 30 Messerschmitt Bf 110 heavy fighters. Near the Farne Islands, Sheen destroyed a Junkers Ju 88 medium bomber and a Bf 110, two of the eleven Luftwaffe aircraft shot down that were credited to the pilots of the squadron. In late August, No. 72 Squadron moved to Biggin Hill, just as the Luftwaffe escalated its operations against southern England.

Sheen was shot down in an engagement near Croydon on 1 September, baling out uninjured. Returning to duty, his flight lieutenant rank was made substantive on 3 September, and the next day he probably destroyed a Bf 110 near Tonbridge. On 5 September the squadron was patrolling over Hawkinge when it engaged several Messerschmitt Bf 109 fighters; Sheen was again shot down, necessitating his baling out of his Spitfire but this time he was wounded in the leg and hand in addition to facial wounds. He was hospitalised for six weeks.

On his return to No. 72 Squadron in mid-October, Sheen took command of one of its flights. In November the squadron moved to Leuchars and the pace of operations slowed over the winter months with little action seen. Returning to Acklington in early 1941, the squadron began to carry out night patrols. On the night of 13 March, Sheen shot down a Ju 88 to the north of Acklington, the first aerial victory of the year for a pilot of the squadron. In April he was promoted to squadron leader and appointed commander of No. 72 Squadron.

=== Circus offensive ===
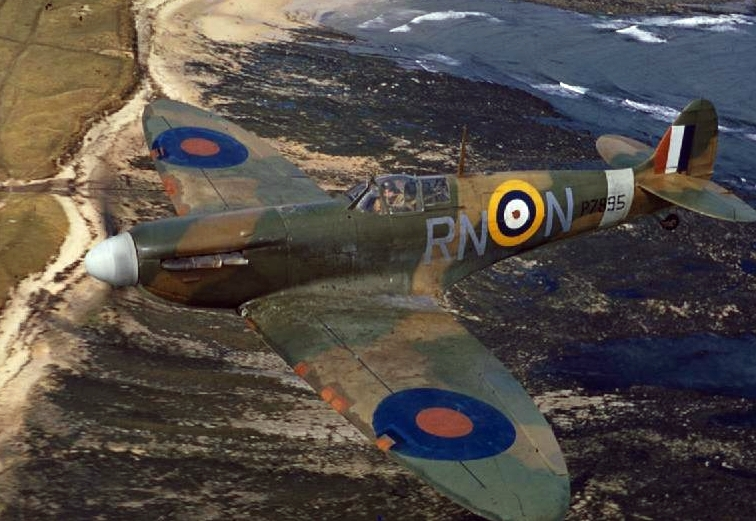
A Spitfire of No. 72 Squadron, April 1941

In July the squadron relocated to Biggin Hill from where it operated on fighter sweeps to German-occupied Europe as part of the RAF's Circus offensive. On 17 August Sheen damaged a Bf 109 to the southwest of Cap Gris-Nez, and achieved the same feat later in the month, on 29 August near Hazebrouck. On 2 October he probably destroyed a Bf 109 over Abbeville. In recognition of his success while leading No. 72 Squadron, Sheen was awarded a Bar to his DFC in mid-October. The citation for the Bar, published in The London Gazette, read:

Since July, 1941, Squadron Leader Sheen has led the squadron, and on occasions the wing, in 43 offensive operations over Northern France. He has carried out these missions with consistent skill and courage and, under his leadership, the squadron has attained a high standard of efficiency. On one occasion the squadron was menaced by a superior number of enemy fighters but, by his coolness and clever tactics. Squadron Leader Sheen saved his unit from suffering heavy casualties and succeeded in destroying at least 3 of the fighters. Squadron Leader Sheen has personally destroyed a number of enemy aircraft including 1 at night.

— The London Gazette, No. 35318, 21 October 1941.

=== Later war service ===
Having been involved in 47 sorties during the Circus offensive, and occasionally leading the Biggin Hill fighter wing during this time, Sheen was rested from operations in November. He was assigned to a staff role at No. 9 Group, with responsibility for training. Twelve months later, having been promoted to wing commander, he became the commanding officer of the RAF station at Manston. He subsequently was commander at the airfields at Skeabrae, in the Orkney Islands, and then Drem until March 1944, when he took command of the Second Tactical Air Force's No. 148 Wing. In January 1945, he went to Cairo in Egypt where he served on the staff of the headquarters of RAF Middle East Command.

== Postwar service ==
Sheen's service in the RAF ended in late-1946 and he returned to Australia. However, after a time he rejoined the RAF, being granted a permanent commission as a squadron leader in January 1950. At that time he took command of No. 502 Squadron, of the Royal Auxiliary Air Force. This was equipped with the Spitfire but under Sheen's leadership, converted to the de Havilland Vampire jet fighter. In 1954 Sheen served with the Central Fighter Establishment, in its Air Fighting Unit. A year later, having been promoted to wing commander, he was appointed wing leader at Leuchars. He was promoted to group captain in January 1964.

In January 1965, Sheen was part of the RAF cortège at the funeral procession for former prime minister Winston Churchill. Much of the remainder of his RAF career was spent with Transport Command. He retired from military service in January 1971, still in the rank of group captain.

== Later life ==
Returning to civilian life, Sheen worked for the aerospace manufacturer British Aircraft Corporation, which later became British Aerospace. He was involved the marketing and sales for the BAC One-Eleven and the Concorde supersonic airliner. He died in June 2001.

Sheen is credited with having destroyed five aircraft, one of which was shared with other pilots, and damaged two others. He also probably destroyed two other aircraft.
