= No. 136 Squadron RAF =

Defunct flying squadron of the Royal Air Force

- Active: 1 Apr 1918 - 4 Jul 1918; 20 Aug 1941 – 8 May 1946
- Country: United Kingdom
- Branch: Royal Air Force
- Part of: RAF Third Tactical Air Force, South East Asia Command
- Nickname: The Woodpeckers
- Mottos: Latin: Nihil Fortius ("Nothing is stronger") "Nothing too tough" (squadron use)
- Engagements: Arakan Campaign 1942–1943, Burma Campaign, Battle of Imphal

Insignia
- Squadron Badge heraldry: Upon the side of a stem of tree erect, a green woodpecker. The woodpecker was chosen as the squadrons original call-sign was "Woodpecker"
- Squadron Codes: HM (Dec 1943 - May 1946)

No. 136 Squadron RAF was a short-lived RAF unit that saw no action in World War I, but upon reformation became the highest scoring unit in South East Asia Command during World War II. Shortly after the war the squadron was disbanded.

== History ==
=== Formation in World War I ===
No. 136 squadron was formed on 1 April 1918 at Lake Down, Wiltshire, as a service unit (not a training unit), working up for the Airco DH.9, using a variety of aircraft. Following Air Ministry letter C4519 of 4 July of that year, however, it was disbanded, together with 12 other such units. Plans to reinstate the squadron in September as laid out in Air Organisation Memorandum 939 of 13 July 1918 came to nought as Air Organisation Memorandum 999 of 17 August 1918 cancelled these.

=== World War II ===
==== Reformation ====
The squadron was reformed at RAF Kirton-in-Lindsey, Lincolnshire on 20 August 1941 as a fighter squadron, flying Hawker Hurricanes and became operational on 28 September, doing shipping patrols and scrambles. This lasted only one month as the squadron was scheduled to move to the Middle East on 9 November to support Russian forces in the Caucasus and so protecting the vital Middle East oil fields.

==== On the road to... ====
En route however the destination was changed to the Far East, following the news of Pearl Harbor and the sinking of HMS Prince of Wales and HMS Repulse. On arrival in India the squadron was redirected to Burma, arriving there at Rangoon in early February 1942. However, because of the fast advance of the Japanese forces it was necessary to withdraw the squadron back to India again, 26 February to RAF Dum Dum and a day later Asansol, and before the squadron had chances to become really operational. Attacks by the Japanese forces and accidents had the squadron with only six flyable Hurricanes left by this time.

==== India and Burma ====
Regrouped as an operational squadron on 31 March 1942 around Alipore, still on Hurricanes, the squadron provided convoy patrols and air defence of the Calcutta area, but in December it began operating detachments over the Burmese front and by the end of the month it moved to Chittagong to continue these operations from there. Returning to India at RAF Amarda Road in November 1943 for a training course, the squadron meanwhile had converted to Spitfire Mk.Vs in October and returned to the Burmese front with them in December 1943.

==== Ceylon and the Cocos Islands ====
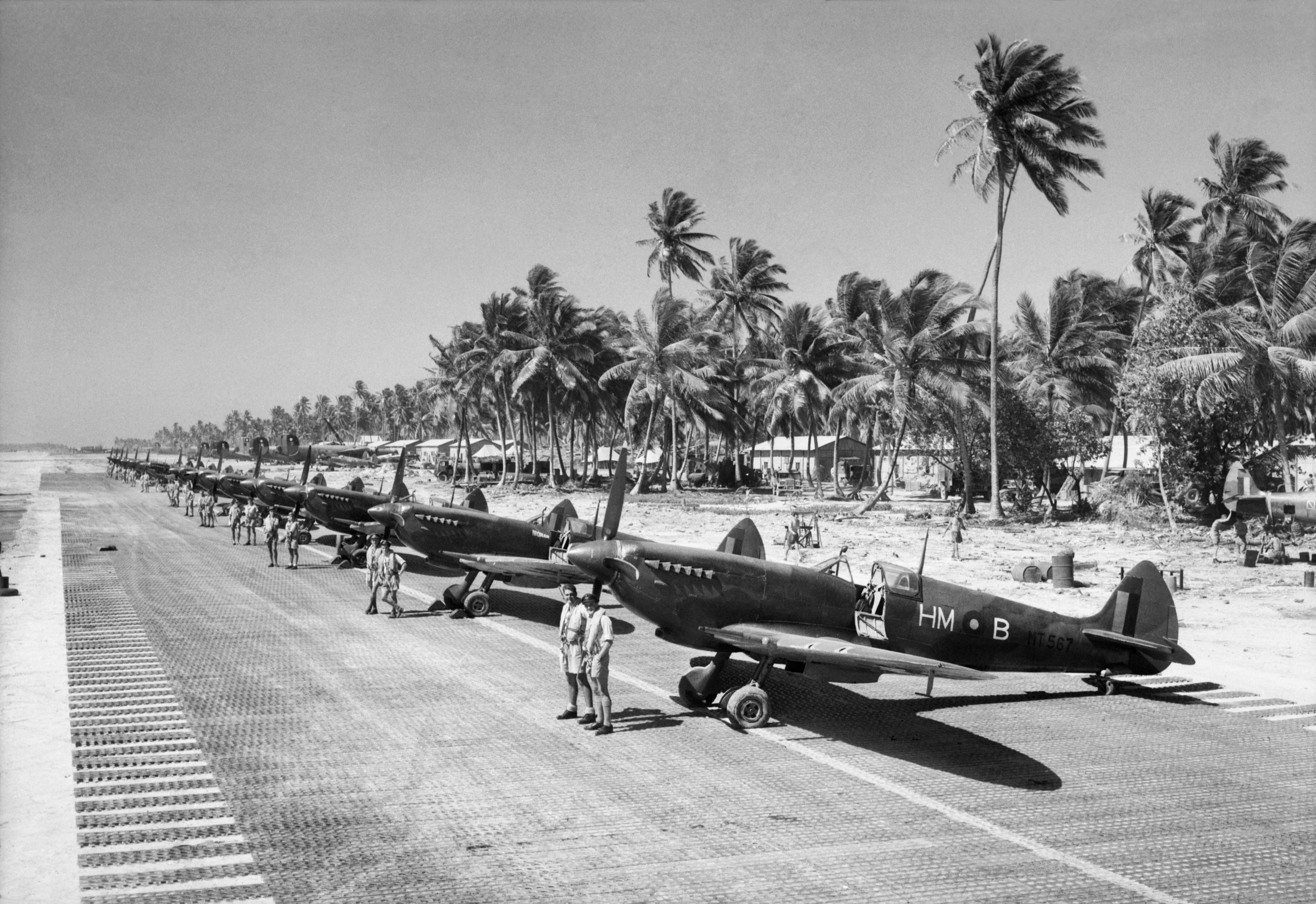
A line up of No. 136 Squadron Supermarine Spitfire Mk VIII fighters at the airstrip on the Cocos Islands

In January 1944 the Spitfire Mk.Vs went to another unit (Note: Rawlings claims the Spitfire Mk.Vs went to No. 132 Squadron RAF, but given the fact that it was stationed in the UK at that time this seems unlikely.) and were replaced with Spitfire Mk.VIIIs. In July the squadron moved to Ceylon, flying from Ratmalana and later from Minneriya. At the end of March 1945, the Squadron ground echelon had left for the Cocos Islands and the squadron's aircraft began flying upon completion of the airstrip there a month later.

==== Malaya ====
After the Japanese surrender the squadron re-located to RAF Tengah, Singapore in October and from there went on to Kuala Lumpur, Malaysia in November 1945, where they received Spitfire Mk.XIVs and where it remained until 8 May 1946, when the squadron embarked for India. Arriving in Bombay, the squadron was disbanded on 8 May 1946 by being renumbered to No. 152 Squadron RAF.

== Aircraft operated ==
From	To	Aircraft	Variant
Apr 1918	Jul 1918	Various	
Aug 1941	Nov 1941	Hawker Hurricane	Mk.IIb
Oct 1941	Nov 1941	Hawker Hurricane	Mk.IIa
Apr 1942	Mar 1943	Hawker Hurricane	Mk.IIb
Mar 1943	Oct 1943	Hawker Hurricane	Mk.IIc
Oct 1943	Feb 1944	Supermarine Spitfire	Mk.Vc
Jan 1944	May 1946	Supermarine Spitfire	Mk.VIII
Feb 1946	May 1946	Supermarine Spitfire	Mk.XIV

== Squadron bases ==
From	To	Name
Apr 1918	Jul 1918	Lake Down
Aug 1941	Nov 1941	RAF Kirton-in-Lindsey
Nov 1941	Feb 1942	en route
Feb 1942	Feb 1942	Rangoon
Feb 1942	Feb 1942	Dum Dum (Dets. at Mingaladon, Akyab and Ratmalana, Ceylon
Feb 1942	Mar 1942	Asansol (Dets. at Mingaladon, Akyab and Ratmalana
Mar 1942	Jun 1942	Alipore, India (Det. at Maidan)
Jun 1942	Aug 1942	Red Road Maidan / 'Angel' (Det. at Vizagapatam)
Aug 1942	Sep 1942	Alipore (Det. at Vizagapatam)
Sep 1942	Dec 1942	Dum Dum
Dec 1942	Jun 1943	Chittagong
Jun 1943	Nov 1943	Baigachi
Nov 1943	Nov 1943	Amarda Road
Nov 1943	Dec 1943	Baigachi
Dec 1943	Dec 1943	Ramu 2 /'Lyons'
Dec 1943	Dec 1943	Alipore
Dec 1943	Dec 1943	Ramu 2 /'Lyons'
Dec 1943	Jan 1944	Ramu 3 / 'Hay'
Jan 1944	Mar 1944	Rumkhapalong / 'Rumkha'
Mar 1944	Mar 1944	Sapam
Mar 1944	Apr 1944	Wangjing
Apr 1944	Jul 1944	Chittagong
Jul 1944	Dec 1944	Ratmalana, Ceylon
Dec 1944	Mar 1945	Minneriya, Ceylon
Mar 1945	Apr 1945	en route to Cocos Islands
Apr 1945	Oct 1945	Cocos Islands
Oct 1945	Oct 1945	HMS Smiter
Oct 1945	Nov 1945	Tengah
Nov 1945	May 1946	Kuala Lumpur, Malaysia
May 1946	May 1946	Bombay, India

== Commanding officers ==
From	To	Name
Aug 1941	Jul 1942	S/Ldr. T.A.F. Elsdon, DFC
Jul 1942	Dec 1942	S/Ldr. A.W. Ridler
Feb 1943	May 1943	S/Ldr. A.W.A. Bayne, DFC
Jun 1943	Mar 1944	S/Ldr. A.N. Constantine
Mar 1944	Oct 1944	S/Ldr. E.O. Watson
Oct 1944	Jun 1945	S/Ldr. D.G. Soga
Jun 1945	Oct 1945	S/Ldr. A.J.H. Kitley
Oct 1945	Dec 1945	F/Lt. J.D.R. Cameron
Dec 1945	Dec 1945	S/Ldr. M. Paddle
Dec 1945	Jan 1946	S/Ldr. D.M. Finn, DFC
Jan 1946	May 1946	S/Ldr. G.B. Smither, DFC
