= Alec Coryton =

Royal Air Force Air Chief Marshal (1895-1981)

Sir Alec Coryton
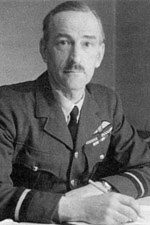
- Air Commodore Coryton c. 1940
- Born: 16 February 1895; Pentillie, Pillaton
- Died: 20 October 1981 (aged 86); Langton Matravers
- Military career
- Allegiance: United Kingdom
- Branch: British Army (1914–1918); Royal Air Force (1918–1951)
- Service years: 1914–1951
- Rank: Air Chief Marshal
- Commands: AHQ Burma (1945); Third Tactical Air Force (1944); No. 5 Group (1942–1943); No. 16 Squadron (1925–1928)
- Conflicts: World War I World War II
- Awards: Knight Commander of the Order of the Bath; Knight Commander of the Order of the British Empire; Member of the Royal Victorian Order; Distinguished Flying Cross; Chevalier of the Legion of Honour (France); Commander of the Legion of Merit (United States)

Air Chief Marshal Sir William Alec Coryton, KCB, KBE, MVO, DFC (16 February 1895 – 20 October 1981) was a senior Royal Air Force (RAF) commander in World War II. He was considered by his peers as one of the RAF's most capable group commanders.

== Early life and First World War ==
Coryton was born at Pentillie Castle in Cornwall on 16 February 1895. He was commissioned as an officer in the British Army's Rifle Brigade (Special Reserve) during World War I. In 1918 he was transferred to the Royal Flying Corps (RAF) as a lieutenant. When the RFC became the Royal Air Force, he resigned his army commission and became an officer of the Royal Air Force.

== RAF career ==
From 1925 to 1928, Coryton was Officer Commanding 16 Squadron, based at Old Sarum, Wiltshire, operating the Bristol F.2 Fighter in the tactical reconnaissance role.

In 1938 Coryton was made Director of Operations (Overseas) at the Air Ministry. He held this post until April 1942, when he was assigned Air Officer Commanding No. 5 Group RAF. While there he presided over the introduction of the Avro Lancaster into service. In February 1943 Coryton was relieved and replaced by Ralph Cochrane. Air Vice Marshal Don Bennett asserted that Coryton was sacked by Air Chief Marshal Sir Arthur Harris for refusing to send a force of 24 of his Lancasters in poor weather conditions on a sneak raid to Berlin. Coryton was moved to the Air Staff at the Air Ministry, where he served as Assistant Chief of Air Staff (Operations). On 25 August 1944 Coryton was made Commander, RAF Third Tactical Air Force, which was renamed RAF in Bengal & Burma on 4 December 1944 with Coryton remaining in command.

Ten days later he was made Assistant Air Commander, Eastern Air Command, a position he held until May 1945.

About 15 October 1945, he handed over his duties in Burma and became Controller of Research and Development at the Ministry of Aircraft Production. The next year he transferred to the Ministry of Supply as Controller of Supplies (Air).

Coryton retired from the RAF in 1951, but remained at the Ministry of Supply in a civilian capacity. He died on 20 October 1981 at Langton Matravers, Dorset.

Military offices
Preceded by John Slessor	Air Officer Commanding No. 5 Group; 1942–1943	Succeeded by Ralph Cochrane
Preceded by Jack Baldwin	Air Officer Commanding Third Tactical Air Force; Post downgraded to AOC HQ RAF Bengal and Burma on 4 December 1944; Post renamed AOC HQ RAF Burma on 1 June 1945; 1944–1947	Post disestablished
