= Jack Baldwin (RAF officer) =

Royal Air Force Air Marshal (1982–1975)

Sir John Eustice Arthur Baldwin
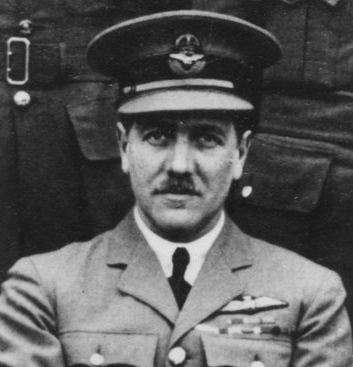
- Wing Commander Baldwin as Commandant of the Central Flying School c. 1929
- Born: 13 April 1892
- Died: 28 July 1975 (aged 83); Rutland, England
- Military career
- Allegiance: United Kingdom
- Branch: British Army (1910–18); Royal Air Force (1918–44)
- Service years: c. 1910–1944
- Rank: Air Marshal
- Commands: Third Tactical Air Force (1943–44); Bomber Command (1942); No. 3 Group (1939–42); No. 21 Group (1938–39); RAF College Cranwell (1936–38); No. 1 Group (1934–35); Central Flying School (1928–31); 41st Wing RFC (1917–18); No. 55 Squadron (1916–17)
- Conflicts: First World War; Second World War
- Awards: Knight Commander of the Order of the British Empire; Companion of the Order of the Bath; Distinguished Service Order; Mentioned in Despatches (4); Officer of the Order of the Crown (Belgium); Croix de guerre (Belgium); Order of the White Lion (Czechoslovakia); War Cross (Czechoslovakia); Air Medal (United States)

Air Marshal Sir John Eustice Arthur Baldwin, KBE, CB, DSO, DL (13 April 1892 – 28 July 1975) was a senior officer in the Royal Air Force during the Second World War.

== Early life ==
Educated at Rugby School and the Royal Military College, Sandhurst, Baldwin was commissioned into the 8th (King's Royal Irish) Hussars in 1911 and served as a cavalry Officer in the First World War.

== Military service ==
Baldwin was awarded the Royal Aero Club's Aviator's Certificate no. 971 on 17 November 1914 and became a pilot in the Royal Flying Corps. He was appointed Officer Commanding No. 55 Squadron in October 1916 and Officer Commanding No. 41 Wing in December 1917 before transferring to the Royal Air Force on its formation in 1918. He was appointed Commandant of the Central Flying School in 1928 and served as Aide-de-Camp to King George V from 1931 to 1932. He went on to be Air Officer Commanding No. 1 Group in 1934, Director of Personal Services in 1935 and Commandant of the RAF College Cranwell in 1936 before taking up the post of Air Officer Commanding No. 21 Group in 1938. He retired in August 1939.

Just two weeks later, Baldwin was recalled to serve in the Second World War as Air Office Commanding No. 3 Group at RAF Bomber Command. Between 9 January and 21 February 1942, he was acting Commander in Chief of Bomber Command, after the removal of Richard Peirse. During this brief tenure the "Channel Dash" occurred, when the Scharnhorst and Gneisenau escaped from the French port of Brest and fled up the English Channel to the sanctuary of Kiel harbour in northern Germany. In October 1942 he became Deputy Air Officer Commanding-in-Chief, India. This appointment was followed from November 1943 by his posting as Air Officer Commanding Third Tactical Air Force which supported the ground battle in South East Asia. On 5 February 1943, Baldwin attended the departure of Major General Orde Wingate, the Chindits and the 1st Air Commando Group departed for Operation THURSDAY in Burma. He reverted to the Retired List again on 15 December 1944. Baldwin was Colonel of the 8th King's Royal Irish Hussars from 1948 until 1958, when the unit amalgamated to form the Queen's Royal Irish Hussars.

== Personal life ==
In 1916 Baldwin married Kathleen Betsy Terry of the York confectionery family (Terry's), they lived in the village of Ketton, Rutland from the 1930s to the 1950s and had two children, John and Pamela. John Noel Anthony Baldwin became a captain in the 8th King's Royal Irish Hussars and was killed in action in 1942 in Libya. Baldwin was the High Sheriff of Rutland for 1955–56.

Military offices
Preceded by Charles Burnett	Commandant of the Central Flying School; 1928–1931	Succeeded by Paul Maltby
Preceded by Henry Cave-Browne-Cave	Commandant RAF College; 1936–1938	Unknown
Preceded by Sir Richard Peirse	Commander-in-Chief Bomber Command (Acting); 1942	Succeeded by Sir Arthur Harris
New title Post established	Air Officer Commanding Tactical Air Force (Burma); Post retitled AOC Third Tactical Air Force on 28 December 1943; 1943–1944	Succeeded by Alec Coryton
