= No. 176 Squadron RAF =

Defunct flying squadron of the Royal Air Force

- Active: 15 Jan 1943 – 1 Jun 1946
- Country: United Kingdom
- Branch: Royal Air Force
- Motto(s): Latin: Nocte custodimus (We keep the night watch)

Insignia
- Squadron Badge: A dagger in front of a crescent moon

No. 176 Squadron RAF was a Royal Air Force Squadron that was a night defence unit based in India in World War II.

== History ==
=== Formation in World War II ===
The squadron was formed at RAF Dum Dum, India on 15 January 1943 from a detachment of No. 89 Squadron RAF, flying radar-equipped Bristol Beaufighter night fighters in defence of Calcutta. That night, it flew its first operational sorties, with Flight Sergeant Arthur Pring shooting down three Japanese Mitsubishi Ki-21 bombers in four minutes, becoming an air ace. (Note: Pring and his radar operator had previously claimed three aircraft shot down over Egypt and Malta.) On the night of 19/20 January, another of 176's aircraft intercepted three more Ki-21s, claiming two destroyed and one damaged, but itself being shot down by return fire from the bombers. In fact, only one of the Ki-21s was shot down. The losses of four bombers in a few days caused Japanese night attacks on Calcutta to be suspended. Detachments of the squadron were then based at Chittagong Burma, Ratmalana Ceylon, Baigachi and Mingaladon where the Beaufighters were replaced with Mosquitos in June 1945. The squadron disbanded on 1 June 1946.

== Aircraft operated ==
Aircraft operated by no. 176 Squadron RAF
From	To	Aircraft	Variant
Jan 1943	Aug 1943	Bristol Beaufighter	IF
Jan 1943	Aug 1945	Bristol Beaufighter	VIF
May 1943	Jan 1944	Hawker Hurricane	IIC
Jun 1945	Jul 1945	de Havilland Mosquito	XVI
Jul 1945	Jun 1946	de Havilland Mosquito	XIX
