= Ramgarh Chinese Cemetery =

Cemetery in Jharkhand

Coordinates: 23.610°N 85.488°E

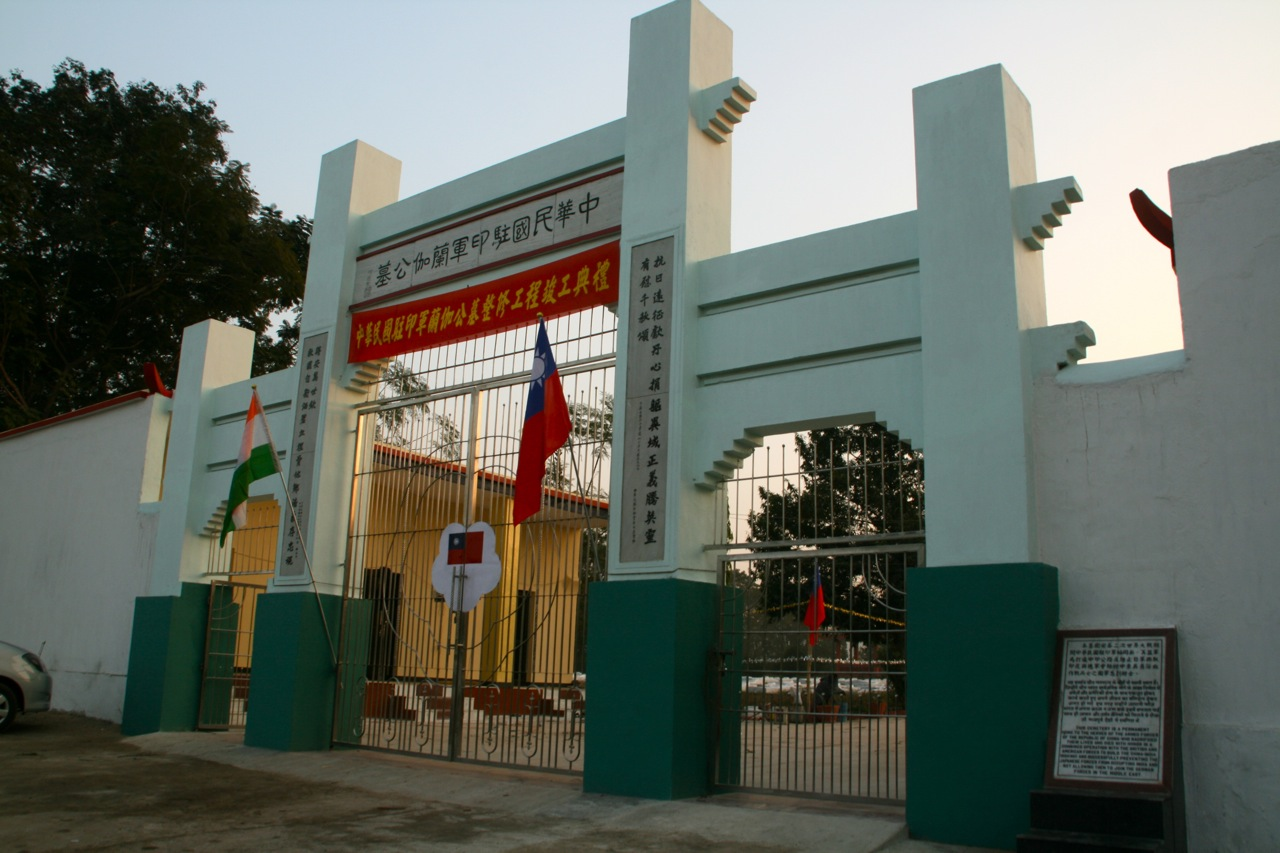
Entrance of Ramgarh Chinese Cemetery

Ramgarh Chinese Cemetery is a military cemetery and World War II memorial located at Ramgarh cantonment, Ramgarh district in the Indian state of Jharkhand. it contains the graves of 667 military personnel of the Republic of China.

== Historical Context ==
After the Japanese invasion of Burma in early 1942, Allied supply routes into China via the Burma Road were severed. Allied and Chinese forces under the command of American Lt. General Joseph Stilwell retreated across the border into British India. Between 1942 and 1945, over 60,000 Chinese soldiers retreated troops and recruits flown in across the Eastern Himalayas. These troops successfully re-entered Burma to defeat Japanese forces and secure the Ledo Road. Many soldiers died during the mission. In the memory of the war heroes, lost their lives in the World War II, General Zheng Dongguo founded the cemetery in December 1944. It is spread over 7.25 acre of land and is covered with forests.
