= No. 52 Squadron RAF =

Flying squadron of the Royal Air Force, 1916-1969

- Active: 15 May 1916 (RFC), 1 April 1918 (RAF) – 23 Oct 1919; 18 January 1937 – 8 April 1940; 1 July 1941 – 31 March 1944; 1 July 1944 –25 April 1966; 1 Dec 1966 – 31 December 1969
- Country: United Kingdom
- Branch: Royal Air Force
- Mottos: Latin: Sudore quam sanguine ("By sweat and blood")
- Battle honours: World War I • Western Front 1916–1918 • Ypres, 1917 • Messines, 1917; World War II • Mediterranean, 1943 • Sicily, 1943 • Pacific 1944–45 • Burma, 1945

Insignia
- Squadron badge heraldry: A lion rampant guardant holding in the forepaws a flash of lightning. The personnel of this squadron were originally recruited from the district of Hounslow, Heston and Isleworth, so the lion has been introduced which appears in the arms of Heston and Isleworth and in those which were used by Hounslow Abbey. The flash of lightning refers to the marking used by this squadron during the First World War.
- Squadron codes: MB Apr 1939 – Sep 1939; ZE Sep 1939 – Apr 1940

No. 52 Squadron was a Royal Air Force squadron that saw service in both World War I and World War II.

== History ==
=== First World War ===
No. 52 Squadron of the Royal Flying Corps was formed as a Corps Reconnaissance squadron at Hounslow Heath Aerodrome on 15 May 1916. It moved to France in November that year, being the first squadron equipped with the Royal Aircraft Factory R.E.8. At first the squadron had little success with its R.E.8s, suffering many spinning accidents, and these losses affected morale so much that in January 1917 the squadron swapped its R.E.8s for the Royal Aircraft Factory B.E.2s of 34 Squadron. It re-equipped again with R.E.8s in May, flying in support of the allied offensives at Ypres that summer. In March 1918 it suffered heavy losses flying ground attack sorties against the German Spring Offensive. The squadron became part of the Royal Air Force when the Royal Flying Corps merged with the Royal Naval Air Service on 1 April 1918, continuing in the Corps Reconnaissance role, for the rest of the war. It returned to the United Kingdom in February 1919, disbanding at Lopcombe Corner on 23 October 1919.

=== Reformation ===
No 52 Squadron reformed at RAF Abingdon on 18 January 1937 from a nucleus provided by 15 Squadron. It was initially equipped with Hawker Hind biplane light bombers, these being replaced by Fairey Battle monoplanes from November 1937. In February 1939, the squadron was assigned the task of training crews for the other squadrons in its group, with its Battles being supplemented by Avro Anson to aid the training task. Following the outbreak of the Second World War it continued in the training role, supporting the Battle equipped Advanced Air Striking Force before being absorbed into No 12 Operational Training Unit on 8 April 1940.

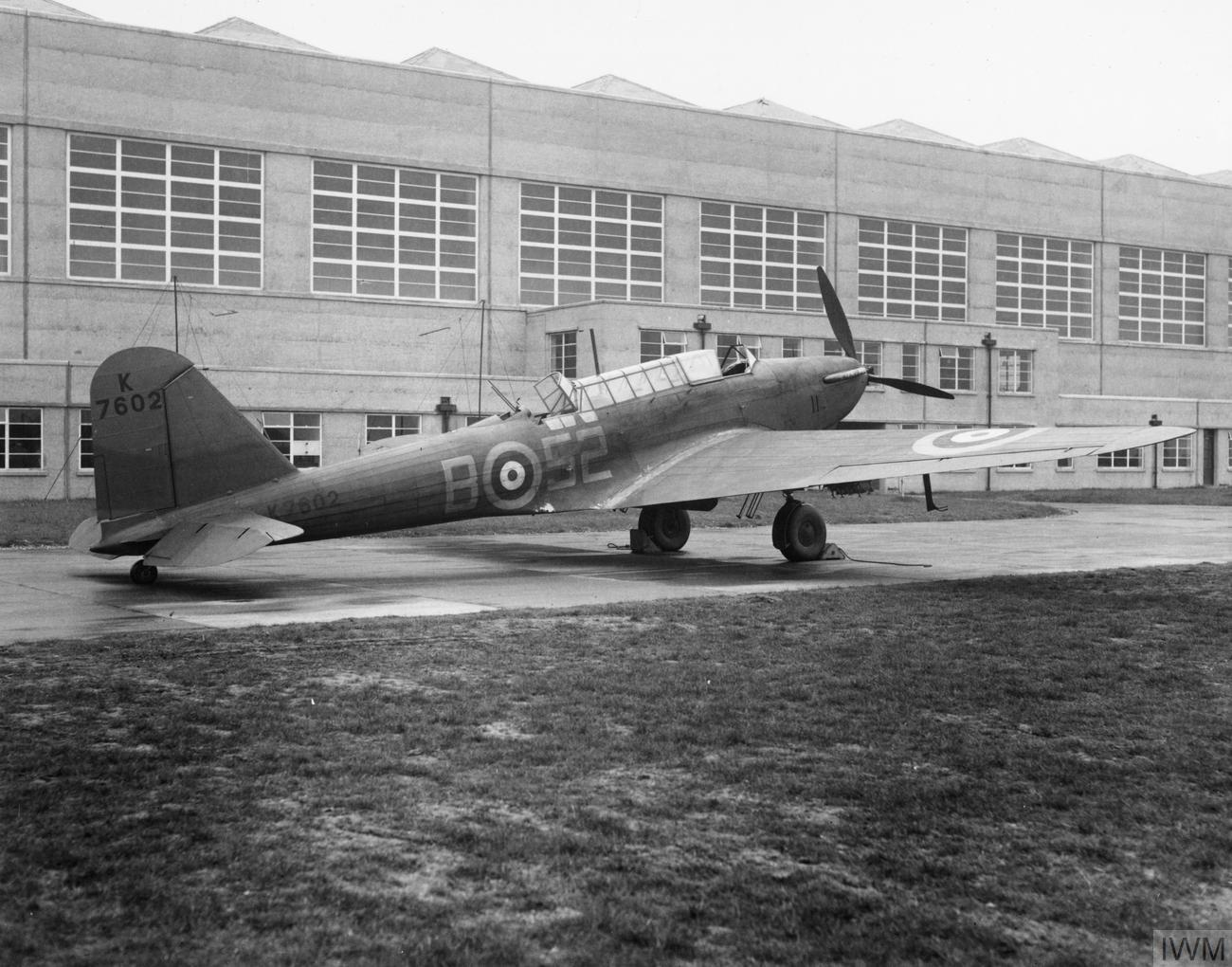
Fairey Battle K7602 '52-B' of No. 52 Squadron at RAF Upwood 1937–38

The squadron reformed on 1 July 1941 at RAF Habbaniya in Iraq as a maintenance unit. Although it had no aircrew, it did have 21 Hawker Audaxes on charge, which were occasionally flown by members of other units based at Habbaniya on reconnaissance missions. In December that year the Audaxes were disposed of, while the Squadron moved to Mosul in August 1942.

No. 52 became a flying squadron again in October 1942, when it received Bristol Blenheims, which were used for survey work over Iraq. Its Blenheims were supplemented with Martin Baltimores in January 1943. It moved to Egypt in February 1943, when it discarded its Blenheims to become a solely Baltimore equipped squadron. 24 Squadron moved to Tunisia in June 1943, where it became operational, flying maritime reconnaissance and Air-Sea-Rescue searches. The squadron moved to Italy in November that year, with detachments at Malta, and then moved again to Gibraltar in February 1944, disbanding on 31 March 1944, having operated within RAF Coastal Command from 20 February 1944.

=== Transport squadron ===
On 1 July 1944, 353 Squadron, a transport squadron equipped with a mix of Lockheed Hudsons and Douglas Dakotas based at Dum Dum near Calcutta, India, was split into two, with the Dakota equipped 'C' and 'D' Flights becoming 52 Squadron. A major role of the new squadron was flying air mail over the Himalaya Mountains to China, the so-called "Hump route". It was also used to operate a mail and general transport service throughout India and Ceylon.

The Squadron received a number of Liberators in December 1944 for Hump operations, with a few Beechcraft Expeditor light transports and de Havilland Tiger Moths modified as air ambulances in 1945. It continued its transport routes to China and throughout India following the end of the War, extending them to Malaya. By the time flights over the Hump route to China finished in December 1945, the Squadron had flown 830 crossings of the Himalayas, carrying 3,277 passengers, 1,916,443 lb (871,100 kg) of cargo and 454,834 lb (20,380 kg) of mail for the loss of one aircraft.

The squadron moved to Mingladon in Burma in October 1946, but transferred to Singapore in July 1947 following a coup. From here it was soon involved in 'Operation Firedog'. Dakotas were replaced by Valettas in 1951 and based at RAAF Butterworth these continued to be used on a regular passenger run between Singapore and Butterworth until unreliability forced cessation of passenger carrying. The squadron continued to operate, notably from Kuching dropping supplies to the jungle troops, mainly Gurkhas, fighting the Indonesian troops in the confrontation war until disbanded on 25 April 1966. The squadron reformed, for the final time so far, on 1 December 1966 at Seletar. It was still employed on general transport duties but was now equipped with Andover aircraft, which it used until disbanding on 31 December 1969.

Tasks were found for the squadron with regular flights to RAAF Butterworth, a twice weekly flight to RAF Kuching, Seria (Anduki) and RAF Labuan, with the aircraft returning after a night stop. The latter flight was also utilised to ferry Gurkha troops to Singapore for onward flights to Nepal. Training and liaison flight were undertaken around the region including Hong Kong, Saigon and Bangkok.

In 1968, the squadron was relocated to RAF Changi and was disbanded in January 1970.
