= Ramgarh Cantonment =

- City; District Headquarters
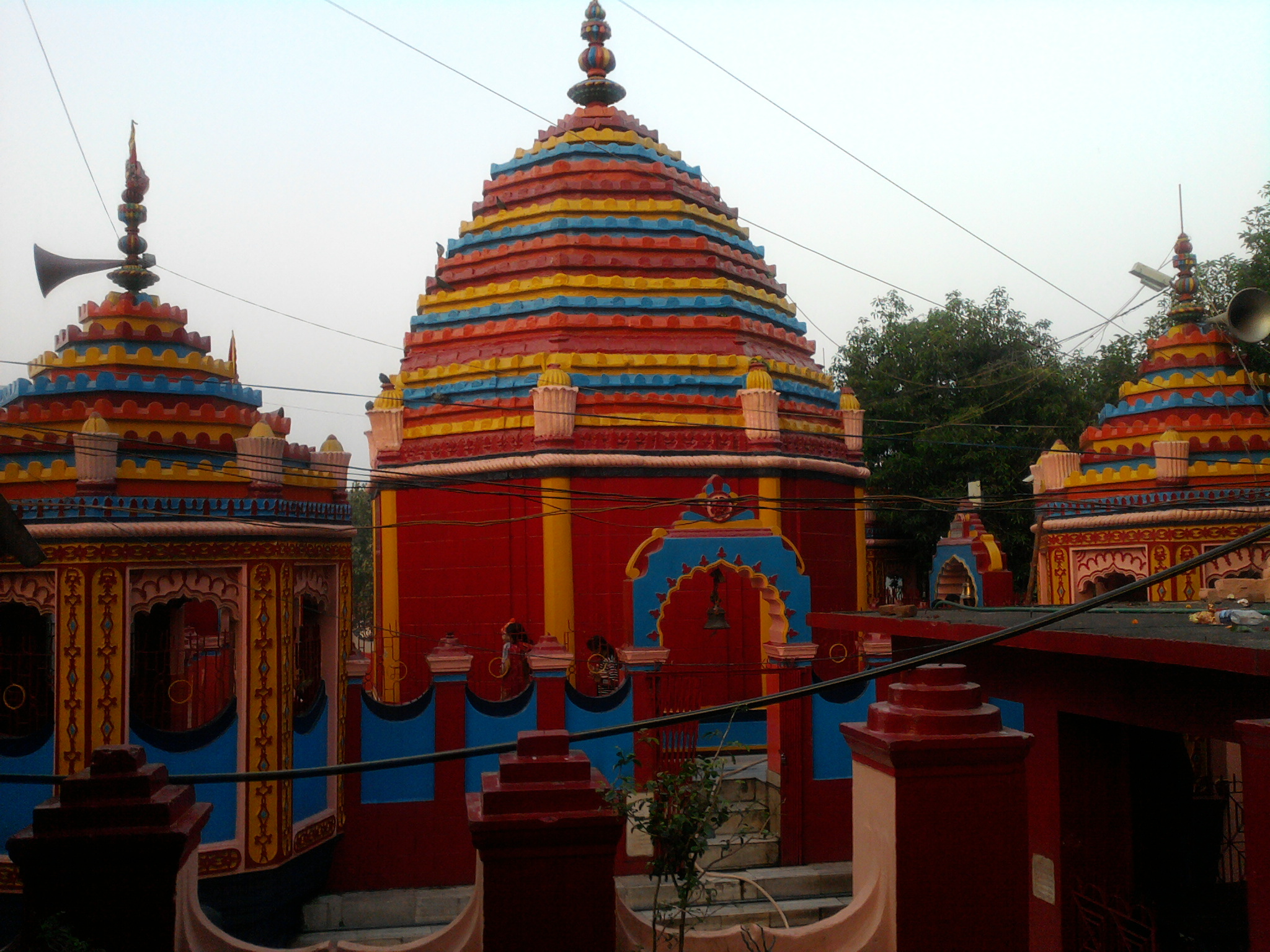
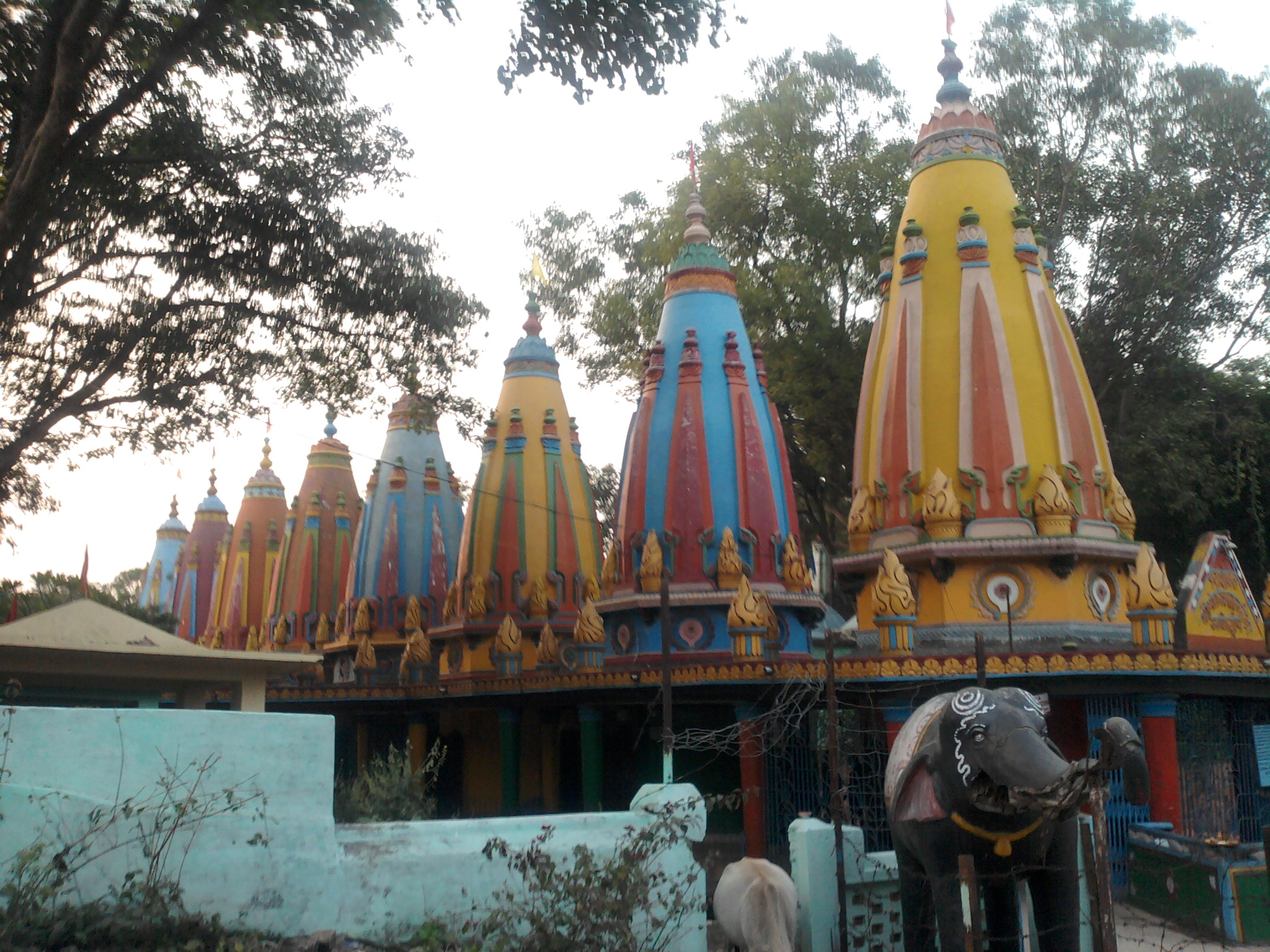
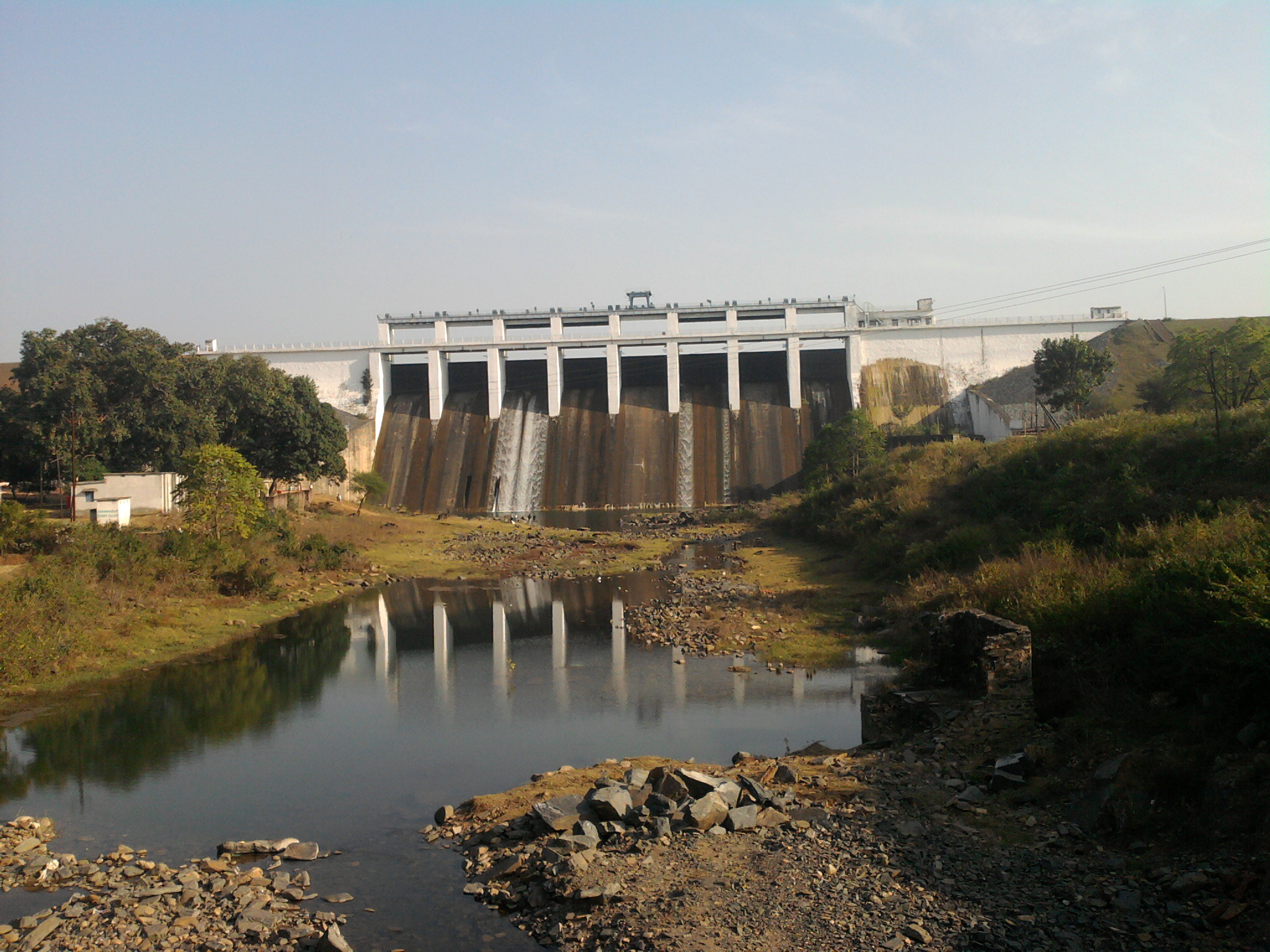
- Clockwise from top left: Temples of Mahavidyas, Maa Chhinnamasta Temple, Naikari Dam

- Location in Jharkhand, India Ramgarh Cantonment (India)
- Coordinates: 23.62°N 85.48°E
- Country: India
- State: Jharkhand
- District: Ramgarh

Population (2011)
  - Total: 132,441

Languages
  - Official: Hindi
- Time zone: UTC+5:30 (IST)
- PIN: 829122
- Vehicle registration: JH-24
- Website: www.ramgarh.nic.in

Ramgarh Cantonment, usually referred to as Ramgarh Cantt or just Ramgarh, is a cantonment town belonging to the Ramgarh district of the Indian state of Jharkhand. Historically a subdivision of the larger Hazaribag district, Ramgarh was elevated to district status on 12 September 2007. As of the 2011 census, the Ramgarh Urban Agglomeration had a population of 132,441.

Ramgarh houses the regimental centres for two of the oldest infantry regiments of India, namely the Punjab Regiment estd. 1761 and the Sikh Regiment estd. 1846. The town has a notable military history, including its role during World War II when Chinese troops were trained at Ramgarh by American instructors, and it was the site of a British prisoner of war camp housing German and Italian prisoners.

Ramgarh Cantonment is a Category-I cantonment. The cantonment board serves as the civic administration body, responsible for public health, water supply, sanitation, primary education, and street lighting. The board consists of eight elected members, three nominated military members, three ex-officio members, and one representative of the District Magistrate, with board members serving five-year terms.

Ramgarh is connected to the state capital Ranchi by the Ranchi Hazaribagh Expressway, approximately 45 kilometres (28 mi) away. The town is surrounded by mineral fields and is home to several pilgrimage sites, historic monuments, and natural attractions, including the Rajrappa Temple at the confluence of the Bhairavi and Damodar rivers.

== Geography ==
Cities, towns and locations in Ramgarh district in North Chotanagpur Division
M: municipality, CT: census town, R: rural/ urban centre, T: tourist centre, P: power plant
Abbreviation used- TPP: thermal power project
Owing to space constraints in the small map, the actual locations in a larger map may vary slightly

=== Location ===
Ramgarh Cantonment is located at 23.62°N 85.48°E.

Note: The map alongside presents some of the notable locations in the district. All places marked in the map are linked in the larger full screen map.

== History ==
In Mahajanpada period, Probably the Chotanagpur was under sub-ordination of Mahapadma Nanda. In Maurya period, it is also said that the entire Chhotanagpur was under the subordination of Ashoka. There are symbolic relies of Buddha period in the temple of Gola. Probably in 8th Century B.C. (3) Jain Trithankar was constructed in Parasnath. In Chapter IV of Gazetteer IV, it is described that Samudragupta (C.385-C-380 A.D.) had invaded Eastern Deccan by passing through this area.

Ramgarh Raj was established in 1368 with Urda at Sisia as capital. The founder King of Ramgarh Raj was King Baghdeo Singh. The headquarters of capital was transferred to Badam and then to Ramgarh. In 1670 the king Dalel Singh shifted his capital to Ramgarh and named it after his father Ram Singh and Ramgarh Raj name was used by royal family henceforth.

It is mentioned in District Gazetteer, Hazaribagh, Chapter IV, Page no.- 69 in around 1740, Ramgarh was "Jungle District of Ramgarh". The Power of obtaining a reference from Ramgarh regime was given to East India Company by King Shah Alam II.

According to District Gazetteer, Page no.- 70, in 1771 Captain Comac was made Military Collector of Ramgarh District, whose headquarters was in Chatra. The military district of Ramgarh contains Nagpur, Palamu, Hazaribagh, Chatra, Giridih and Kodarma. At that time the headquarters of Ramgarh Battalion was Hazaribagh, whose commander was a European. It is mentioned in District Gazetteer, Hazaribagh Chapter IV, Page no.- 72.

The great social reformer and the founder of the Brahm Samaj Raja Ram Mohan Roy were in Ramgarh in 1805–06. He went there with Mr. William Digby who was then acting Magistrate and Registrar of Ramgarh. Raja Ram Mohan Roy was the Sheristeder of the Collectorate and lived both at Cahtra and Ramgarh in this capacity when Mr. William Digby was transferred else here he took Ram Mohan Roy with him to his new place of work".

In 1811, Ramgarh Battalion was used for suppressing the Munda, Uraon and Tamad Revolt and Kol revolt. In 1837, Ramgarh was a police station of the British government. In 1938 a new G.T. road was started and Banaras road was closed. In Sitagarh, the cropping of coffee was taking place. The name of Rupu Manjhi is famous in the first national revolt of 1857.

On 8 January 1856, Sheik Bhikari and Thakur Umraon Singh were hanged on a Bunyan tree of Chhuttupalu valley. This valley is also known as lalki Ghaati and that Bunyan tree is called "Phansiyahi bore". In 1923, Shri K.B. Sahay of Swaraj party was elected for the Provincial Legislative Council of Hazaribagh district (including Ramgarh) (Gazetteer, Page No. 78). During World War II, the Chinese X force was trained at Ramgarh by American instructors at British expense. Ramgarh Chinese Cemetery is there as a Military cemetery during WWII.

Indian National Congress 53rd Session: In 1940 the 53rd Annual Session of the INC was held at Ramgarh under the presidency of Maulana Abul Kalam Azad. At the same time, under the leadership of Netaji Subhash Chandra Bose, a conference against Samjhauta was also held at Ramgarh. Storm and hurricane were on the peak. In Ramgarh, Subhash Chandra Bose was seen as the president of All India Forward Block and M.N. Roy was seen as the leader of the Radical Democratic Party.

Entry to the original place of the INC session is presently not allowed to the public and the place is under the control of the army. The exact location of Bose's session remains controversial.

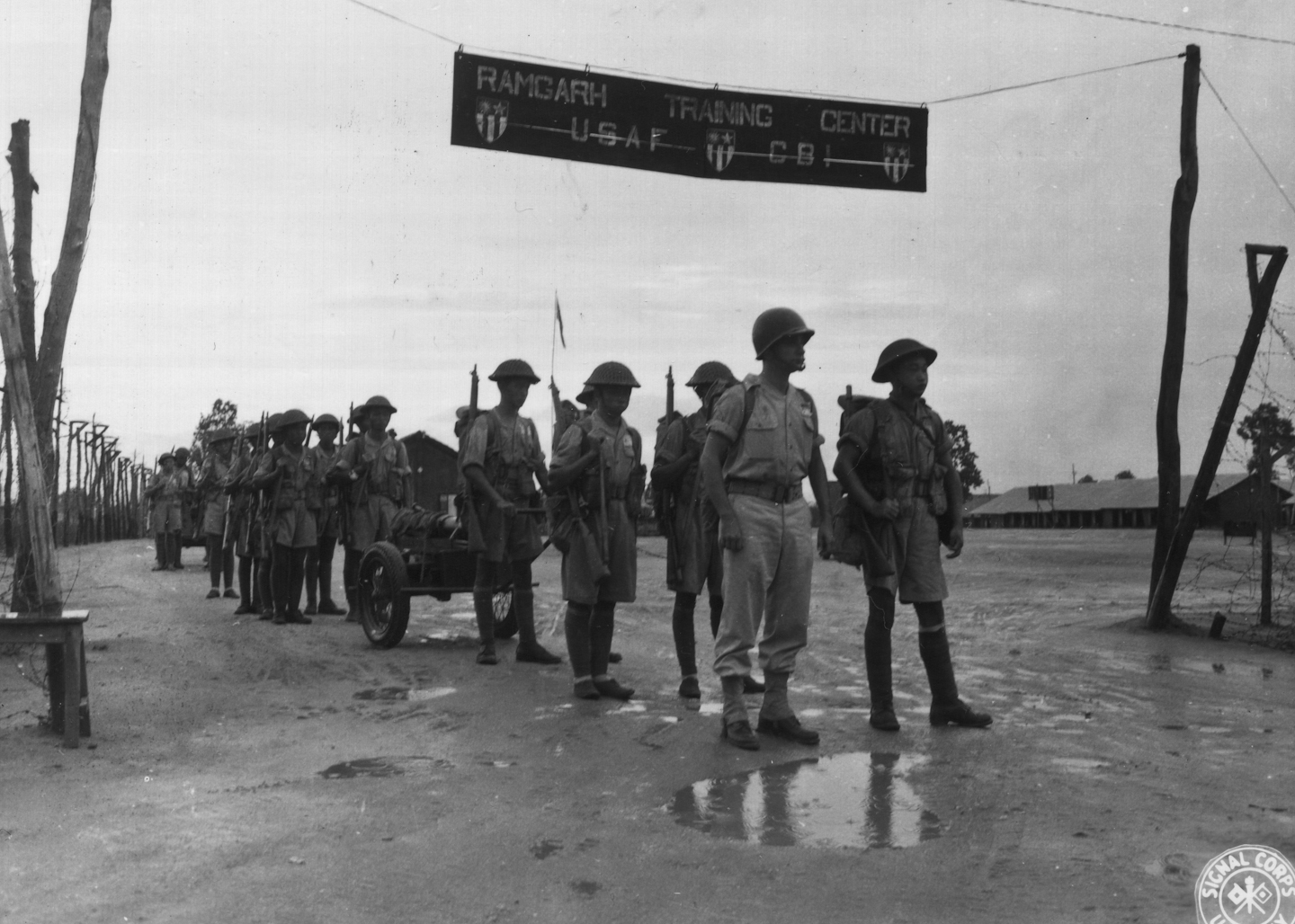
Chinese troops at Ramgarh Training Center June 1944.

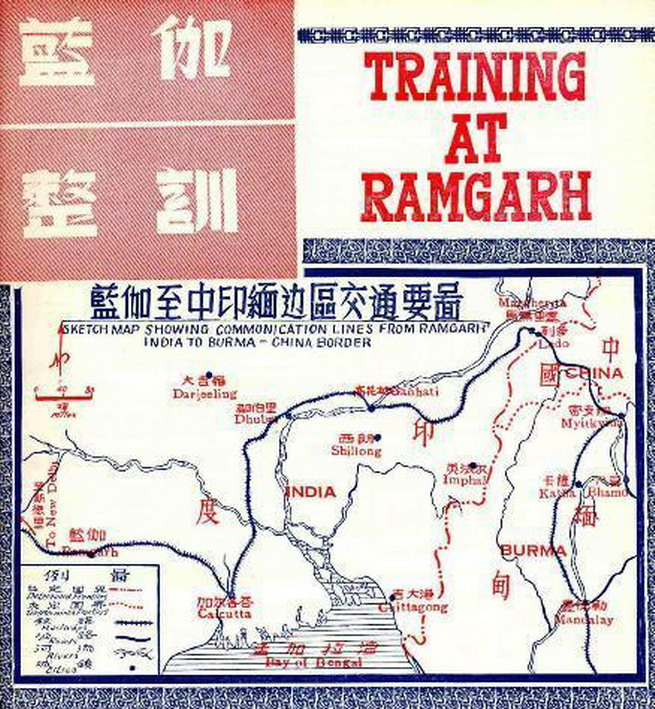
During WWII Chinese troops underwent training at Ramgarh.

Ramgarh Cantt council was the early military cantonment structured in 1941. The history of Cantonment started with the land administration for quartering of troops. Housing was the core objective which attracted the civilian population also to reside in the Cantonment. The Bazaar area was recognized and the Cantonment clearly defined in military, bungalow and civil area.

During the 1940s Chinese troops were trained at Ramgarh by an American contingent. A British Prisoner of War camp existed at Ramgarh at that time where several thousand German and Italian prisoners were housed. With the arrival of the Chinese troops, the prisoners were relocated and the infrastructure handed over for training. The first two American officers arrived at Ramgarh on 27 June 1942. The first Chinese troops arrived on 17 July 1942. Initially, the center was meant for the housing, rehabilitation, clothing, medical treatment, re-equipping and training of the Chinese units which withdrew from Burma in May 1942, unable to stop Japanese advances in the Burma campaign, forfeiting the famous Burma Road and most of Northern Burma. However, other Chinese units were brought in soon. The first course of instruction at Ramgarh commenced on 3 August 1942.

On 10 June 1984, Sikh soldiers of the Sikh regimental center at Ramgarh camp in the erstwhile Bihar state rebelled and murdered their commander, Brig. Gen. R.S. Puri. The mutiny was sparked by an army assault the previous week on the holiest shrine of the Sikh religion, the Golden Temple in the Punjab city of Amritsar. More than 450 people were killed in the attack ordered by Prime Minister Indira Gandhi. Two other senior officers and a number of soldiers were seriously wounded in heavy shooting at the camp that began before noon and continued until 4 p.m. The soldiers joined other angry Sikhs in hijacking private buses and trucks at gunpoint. They set out in at least 35 seized vehicles toward New Delhi before reinforcements from the 24th mountain regiment arrived to stop them. Sikh soldiers remaining behind at the camp raised a white flag of surrender when the reinforcements arrived.

On 12 September 2007, Ramgarh became a new district taking the total count of district in the state to 24.

== Demographics ==
As per 2011 Census of India, Ramgarh Urban Agglomeration had a total population of 132,441, of which males were 70,871 and females 61,562. Ramgarh Urban Agglomeration is composed of Ramgarh Cantonment (Cantonment Board), Sirka (Census Town), Marar (CT) and Barkakana (CT).

As per 2011 Census of India Ramgarh Cantonment had a total population of 88,781, of which 48,110 were males and 40,671 females. Scheduled Castes numbered 4,382 and Scheduled Tribes numbered 4,283.

As of 2001 India census, Ramgarh Cantonment had a population of 73,455. Males constitute 57% of the population and females 43%. Ramgarh Cantonment has an average literacy rate of 68%, higher than the national average of 59.5%: male literacy is 76%, and female literacy is 59%. In Ramgarh Cantonment, 14% of the population is under 6 years of age.

== Literacy ==
As per 2011 census the total number of literates in Ramgarh UA was 95,734 (82.97 per cent of total population) out of which 55,352 (89.57 percent of males) were males and 40,362 (75.35 percent of females) were females.

As per 2011 census the total number of literates in Ramgarh Cantonment was 64,795, out of which 37,578 were males and 27,267 were females.

== Civic administration ==
=== Police stations ===
Ramgarh and Women police stations are located at Ramgarh Cantonment.

=== Headquarters ===
The headquarters of Ramgarh district, Ramgarh subdivision and Ramgrh CD block are located at Ramgarh Cantonment.

== Transport ==
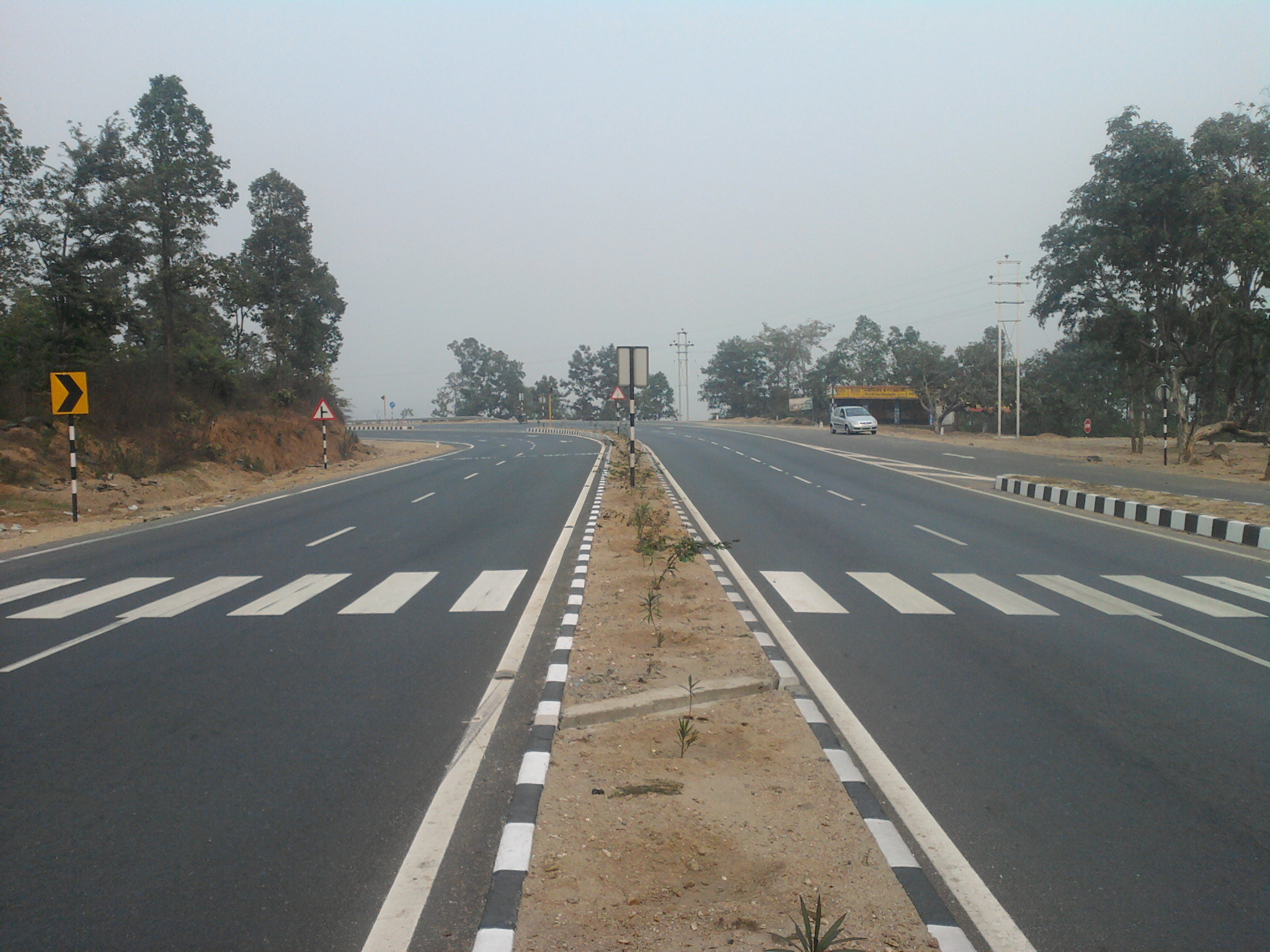
National Highway 20 or Ranchi Hazaribagh Expressway near Ramgarh Cant

=== Railways ===
Ramgarh Cantonment has four Railway Stations Ramgarh Cantt railway station (RMT)SER, Ranchi Road (RRME)ECR, Argada(ARGD)ECR and Barkakana Junction(BRKA)ECR.

=== Roadways ===
Ramgarh Cantonment is connected to state capital Ranchi by Ranchi Hazaribagh Expressway.

== Places of interest ==
=== Pilgrimage sites ===
Rani Sati Dadi Temple: Located near to the Bijulia Lake. This temple is decorated and has antique glass work with Shiv and Bajrang Bali temples too. Various events and programs are organised round the year, and thousands of pilgrims attend them and take blessings. The temple is a replica of the Rani Sati Dadi temple;Jhunjhunu. It is maintained with Mangla path, Bhajans being organized round the year. The temple also has facilities like hall and rooms for organizing some marriage/rituals.

Rajrappa Temple: Located at Rajrappa at a distance of 28 km from Ramgarh Cantonment, the site has views of the merging of river Bhairavi and Damodar, near Mata Chhinmastika Temple visited by lakhs of visitors and pilgrims every year.

Mata Vaishno Devi Temple: Situated in the heart of Ramgarh Cantt, the temple, established in 1991 by Punjabi Hindu Biradari, Ramgarh, is visited by various pilgrims from all over India. The Gumbad of the temple is plated with gold.

Tooti Jharna Temple Situated about 7 km from Ramgarh cantonment on NH-33 (Patna-Ranchi highway), it is a temple devoted to Lord Shiva where the source of water that falls on the Shiv Linga is unknown. The priest of this temple belongs to the nearby village of Digwar, and hence most of the Digwar villagers are connected with this temple.

Maa Vighneshwari Temple Situated at Madhai Mela Tand (Subash Chowk).

Rudhni Math Situated in Camp Area (Temple Lane) and also Nag Baba Mandir.

Kila Mandir Situated in Shivaji Road, in the heart of the town. The soldiers of Ramgarh Battalion had a barricade here, the temple was surrounded and secured by deep canyons filled with water, which was connected to the temple underground now named as Bijulia Talab (lake) which also served as water source for British camp. The Gadh (Kila) of Ramgarh regime was situated nearly 3 km. was on the bank of River Damodar. Famous 'Garh' was signaled from here by the means of Mashal (a source of light). The 'Garh' is still visible from the top of Kila Mandir.

Now Kila Mandir has the Radha Krishna Mandir which is a holy pilgrimage.

Gurudwara Sri Guru Singh Sabha (Gurudwara) Situated in Shivaji Road, near Subhash Chowk. The Gurudwara is a pilgrimage worshipped by people of all religions, and it is famous for their Seva Bhav.

Jama Masjid Situated in Chitarpur, 16 km away from Ramgarh, this mosque is an example of Mughal art and architecture. It can accommodate up to 5000 people at a time to offer their holy namaz. It is the biggest mosque of its kind in Jharkhand. It is believed that this mosque was built around 1670 on a piece of land donated by the then king of Ramgarh. In its present form this mosque resembles the Jama Masjid of Delhi. The mosque has several engravings on its wall as well as calligraphy.

Kothar Shiv Temple Situated 3 km. from Ramgarh on NH 23 (Ramgarh – Bokaro Road). It is said that this temple was built during the Gautam Buddhah Period. It has been marked by the Jharkhand Tourism Department and preserved by the Archaeological Survey of India.

Banjari Mandir (बंजारी मंदिर) Situated nearly 2 km. from Ramgarh on the Ramgarh – Patratu State Highway. An ancient Shakti Pooja place, established by Banjara Samaj.

Purni Madhai Situated at Golpar in Ramgarh Town near Bhudwa Mahadev Temple and Rameshwar Math.

=== Historic monuments ===
Mahatama Gandhi Samadhi Sathal: This place, popularly known as "Gandhi Ghat", is situated on the bank of river Damodar in Ramgarh. Mahatma Gandhi had visited Ramgarh during the year 1940 at the time of congress session at Ramgarh. After the assassination of Mahatma Gandhi in 1948, pitchers containing the remains of the departed soul were dispatched to different places in the country, including Ramgarh. A Samadhi of Gandhiji was erected to house the same. A fair used to be organized here on the occasion of the birthday and anniversary of Bapu, but this practice has been discontinued. The Samadhi is made of black granite stones.

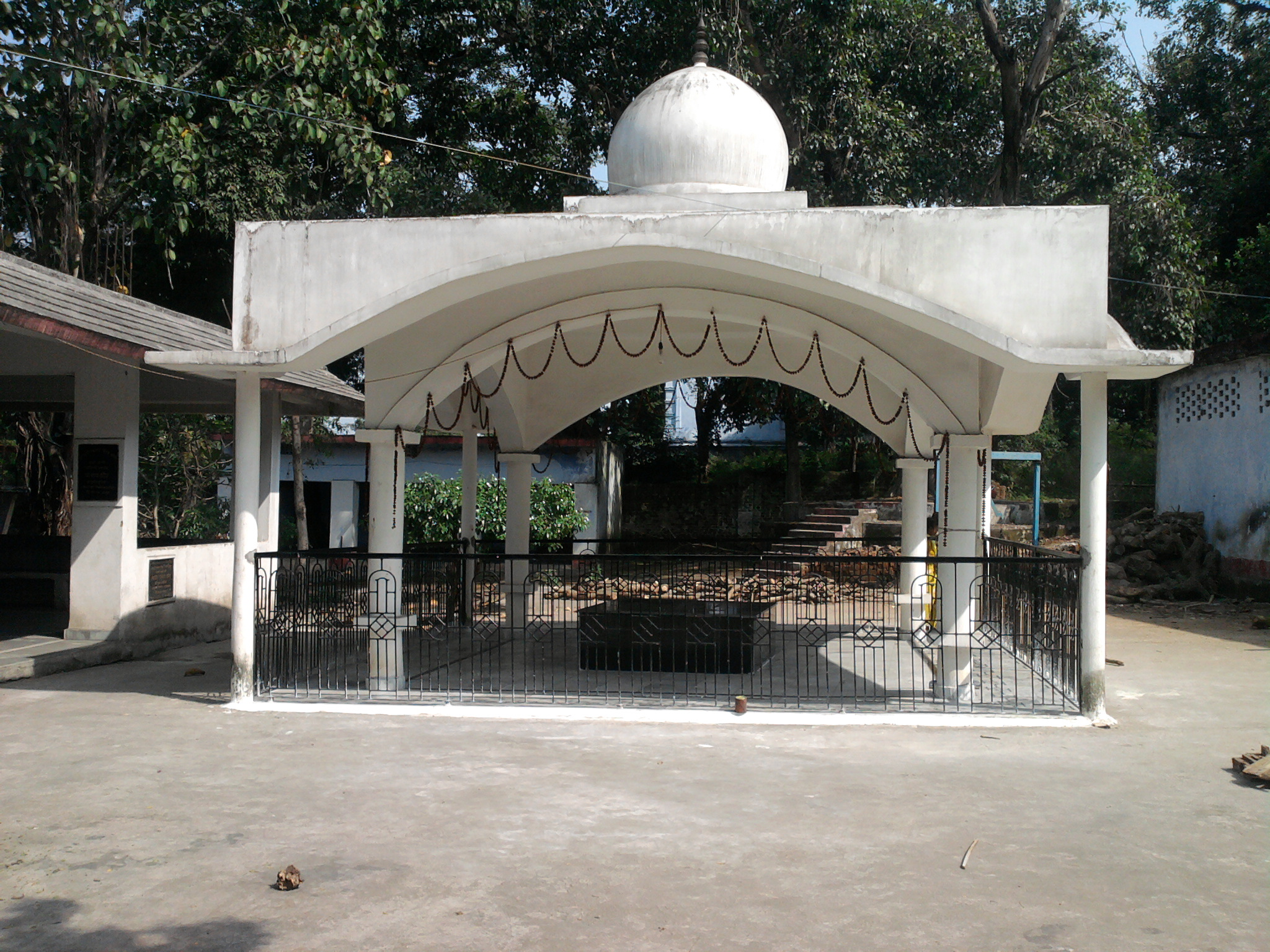
Mahatma Gandhi Samadhi Sathal, Ramgarh.

Fasiyahi Barh [फँसियाही बर (बर मतलब बरगद)] Situated nearly 7 km from Ramgarh (Ramgarh Chuttupalu Ghati) on NH 33. Shaheed Umraon Singh and Shekh Bhikhari, well known Freedom Fighters of Jharkhand, were hanged at this place by the British in the year 1857.

Phansi Ghar Situated in Maran Garah, Giddi. It is the place where the British Empire used to execute people by hanging. It is situated in the bank of River Damodar.

Rajendra Park Situated at Jhanda Chowk in the heart of Ramgarh Town where All India Congress Adhiveshan was organized by Congress Party on 19 March 1941. Leaders of Congress including Mahatma Gandhi, Abdul Kalam Azad and Rajendra Pasad took part in this session. The erstwhile King of Ramgarh is said to have played an instrumental role in organising this session.

=== Nature tourism ===
'Cheerful Chutupallu (प्राकृतिक सुंदरता चुटूपालु का..) Situated at about 10 km from Ramgarh on the Ramgarh Ranchi NH-33 is a hill top with scenery. The height is 2,930 ft. over sea level. There are many dhabas and motels in the way after crossing Chutupallu. Environmental activist from Chutupalu Mr.Vinay Mehta has taken initiative for reducing carbon footprint to promote low emission development in chutupallu ghati and going to open Nature School (J-D Prakriti School) in the Chutupallu shortly.

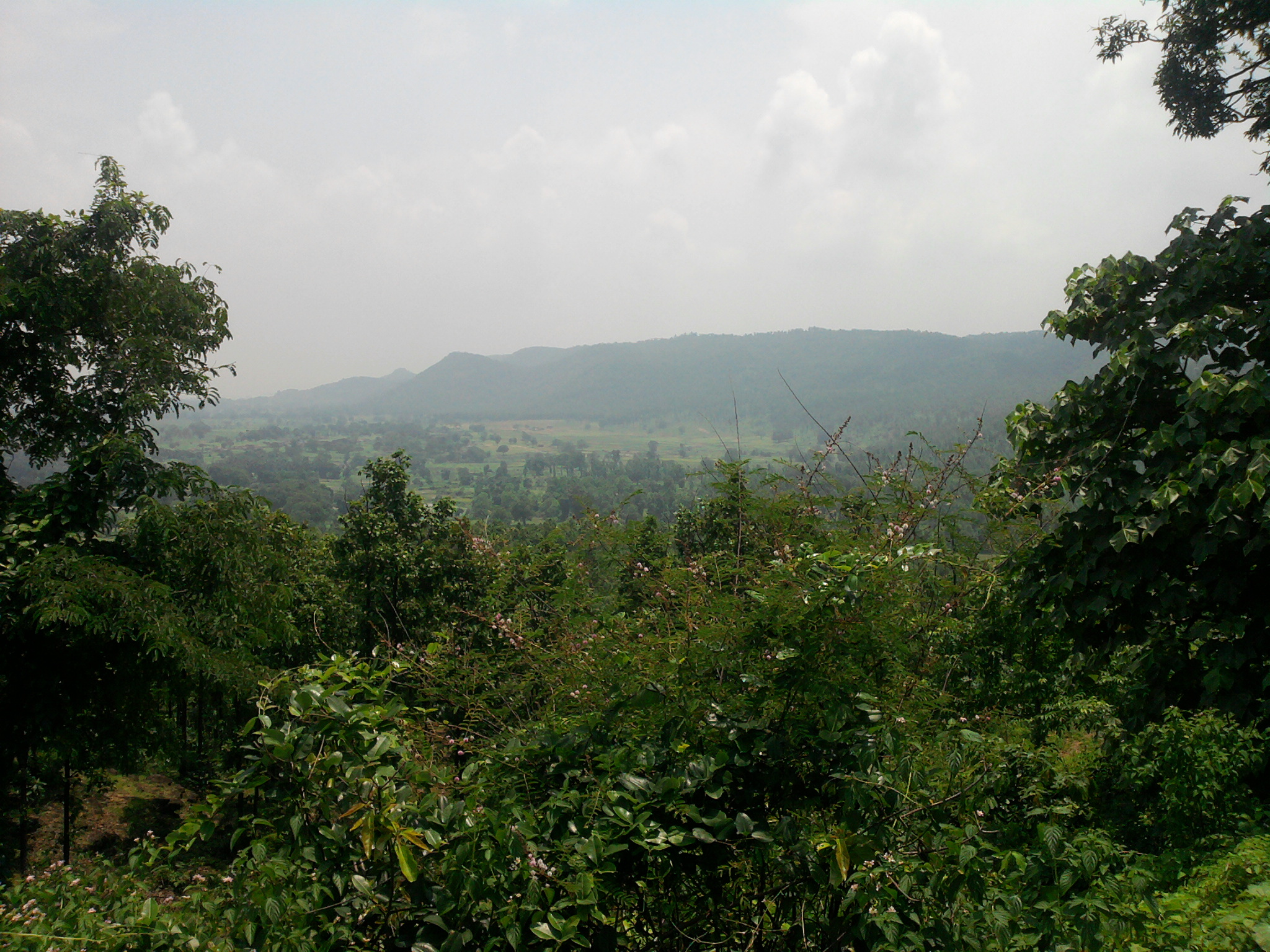
A View of Valley between Ramgarh and Chutupallu

Gandhaunia, (Hindi: गंधौनिया (गरम पानी कुंड)) Situated at about 20 km. near Mandu. It is a hot water spring.

Barso Paani Situated at about 30 km. from Ramgarh near Charhi towards Hazaribagh. Water falls from the ceiling giving the feeling of rainfall in a cave when someone claps.

Liril Fall Situated 6 km. from Ramgarh on the NH 33 NH-33 looks like the fall from the old Liril Soap advertisement. It is popularly known as Liril Fall. Picnics are common here.

Birsa Munda Zoological Garden Situated between Ranchi and Ramgarh at about 35 to 40 km. A large zoological garden.

Lugu Pahar(Hills) Situated nearly 20 km. from Ramgarh. Nearest railway station is Daniya, besides Gomia, a famous Indian explosive factory.

Brigadier Puri Park Brigadier Puri Park is situated on NH 33 at Bijulia in the heart of Ramgarh Town. A statue of Late Brigadier Puri is situated in park. On 10 June 1984, Sikh soldiers stationed at Ramgarh mutinied. The Commandant of the Sikh Regimental Centre in Ramgarh, Brig S.C. Puri, and his two deputies, Col Jagdev Singh and Col H.S. Cheema, were attacked. While Brigadier Puri died, his two deputies were injured.

== See also ==
- Ramgarh (community development block)
