= RAF Intelligence =

British air force intelligence services (1939–1964)

RAF Intelligence Branch

Agency overview
- Formed: 1939
- Dissolved: 1964 (as an independent agency)
- Superseding agency: Defence Intelligence
- Jurisdiction: Government of the United Kingdom

Intelligence services in the Royal Air Force are delivered by officers of the Royal Air Force Intelligence Branch and airmen from the Intelligence Analyst Trade and Intelligence Analyst (Voice) Trade. The specialisation has around 1,200 personnel of all ranks posted to operational air stations, HQs and other establishments of the British Armed Forces, both in the United Kingdom and overseas.

== History ==
Former RAF Intelligence School badge 1942 to 1969

=== RAF Intelligence Branch established in the Second World War ===
Personnel have been employed in intelligence duties since the formation of the RAF in 1918. But the first dedicated RAF Intelligence Branch was established in late 1939 following the outbreak of the Second World War on 3 September. This model was also adopted by other Commonwealth nations. The new Intelligence Branch was initially called the General Duties (Admin) Branch but later renamed the Administrative and Special Duties Branch (for Intelligence duties). At the time, officers of the Intelligence Branch performed the duty of Squadron Intelligence/Protection Officer or aircrew on ground tours in the Air Ministry Intelligence Department. These officers were mainly trained pilots on a ground tour or who for medical reasons could no longer fly. In 1939 the Secret Intelligence Service also established a dedicated Air Intelligence Section under the command of Group Captain F. W. Winterbotham (Chief of Air Intelligence, MI-6). During the Second World War, the Intelligence Branch became larger to encompass the Signals Intelligence staff at Bletchley Park and the Imagery Intelligence staff at RAF Medmenham.

==== Training during the Second World War ====
At the outbreak of war, the Air Ministry recognised the need for formalised Intelligence training and established a number of courses to teach Volunteer Reserve Officers the art of intelligence analysis. Much of this early training was very simplistic and did little more than introduce those to be employed in intelligence duties to the structure of the secretive organisation and where sources came from. The first series of courses started on 20 November 1939 at Hibbert Road in Harrow. These were short courses of seven days' duration giving a broad picture of intelligence in Commands, Groups and Stations. After five of these courses had been run, the training was moved to 14 Ryder Street, St James, London. In September 1940 they moved back to Harrow to Fisher Road School, Wealdstone. Incorporated into the syllabus was the Advanced Intelligence Course, designed for Senior RAF Intelligence Officers from operational commands, and certain Royal Naval and British Army intelligence officers. The first of these courses started on 28 October 1940 and was three weeks in duration. This series continued without interruption and in 1942 developed into the RAF Intelligence School.

In September 1942, the training school moved to Caen Wood Towers (Caenwood Towers), Highgate (this building was later renamed Athlone House). By this time it was clear to the Air Staff that intelligence was a positive and vital element affecting Air Ministry policy, strategy and planning, so the RAF Intelligence School was officially constituted and given a proper home at Caen Wood Towers. The site was set up as Royal Air Force Station Highgate around grounds and outbuildings of the Caen Wood estate. This included accommodation, messing, equipment stores and a medical centre. Because of the sensitivity of intelligence and covert operations during the war, the site was not made fully public and it operated under the guise of an RAF convalescence hospital. A number of different courses were run lasting between five days and three weeks, teaching Air Intelligence, Escape and Evasion, and Basic Intelligence Analysis for direct entrants to intelligence work. The majority of the instruction was given by visiting specialists (from Air Ministry, MI-6, MI-9, Central Interpretation Unit Medmenham and Station "X" at Bletchley Park.)

The unit was soon awarded a badge (crest) as a proof of the high official regard for the value of the school. The badge consisted of a Sphinx, denoting wisdom, backed by a sun in splendour, depicting elucidation, with the motto Praemonitus Praemunitus which translates as "Forewarned is Forearmed".

In 1943, the Unit was transferred for administrative purposes to No. 28 Group RAF under RAF Technical Training Command. Additional courses were added for Security, Air Intelligence for RAF Bomber Command, a Far East Course and Air Intelligence for Senior Officers. During the period from November 1939 to September 1945, 7,086 Officers of the British Services (including dominion and Allied Forces attached to the RAF) attended over 372 courses. In late 1944, the school was hit twice by German V-1 flying bombs causing damage to the buildings and injuring a number of staff.

=== Operations in the Far East ===
During the Second World War, the focus of the RAF Intelligence Branch expanded significantly beyond the European theatre to counter the Japanese threat in the Pacific and South-East Asian theatres. Following the reorganization of regional defences and the establishment of the South East Asia Command (SEAC) in 1943, tactical air reconnaissance, photographic interpretation, and strategic tracking became centralised under Air Headquarters (AHQ) India in New Delhi.

These regional networks oversaw critical data gathering for frontline operations during the Burma campaign and the defence of British India. The Intelligence Directorate at AHQ Delhi was developed across the war by successive British staff; Squadron Leader E. H. C. Seacombe and Wing Commander G. D. Hamilton managed operations into late 1944. Hamilton was subsequently succeeded by Wing Commander Derek Lewis Taylor, who was officially appointed as the Command Intelligence Officer on 25 January 1945. In this capacity, Taylor's role included handling theatre security liaison with British diplomatic officials, such as coordinating security matters with the Consul in Nova Goa.

=== After the Second World War ===
Following the end of the war, training continued at RAF Highgate until 1948 when the Air Ministry decided that the School should move to the Air Ministry building as they were de-requisitioning the property. The Branch was split up into Administrative and Special Duties Branch (Photography) and Administrative and Special Duties Branch (Signals), with no dedicated Air Intelligence specialisation.

In 1965, the three service intelligence departments were amalgamated in the new Defence Intelligence Staff at the Ministry of Defence. Training at the RAF Intelligence School continued until 1969, teaching non-specialist Officers (GD and Administrators) the basics of Intelligence. The role of Squadron or Station Intelligence Officer was filled by members of the Administrative Branch as a sub-specialisation.

On 2 August 1969, the RAF Intelligence School was officially closed and intelligence training was transferred to the School of Service Intelligence (SSI) at Ashford, Kent. In the 1950s the Photographic Interpretation (PI) Branch was formed for commissioned officers to be employed at the reconnaissance intelligence centres attached to aircraft units, and also to work at the Joint Air Reconnaissance Intelligence Centre (JARIC) at RAF Brampton.

By the start of the 1990s, the RAF could see the benefit of an independent Intelligence Branch, creating the GD (Intelligence) Branch. They required more information and warning on the potential enemies around the world in order to maintain the diminishing RAF's ability to react. In 1997, GD (INT) became the Operations Support (Intelligence) specialisation that is in existence today.

However, training for officers focused on imagery analysis with general intelligence being taught at Ashford on a three week course at the Defence Intelligence and Security School (DISS), the renamed SSI. The first professional Air Intelligence course, named the Joint Air Intelligence Course (JAIC), and subsequently, with the formation of Space Command, the Joint Air and Space Intelligence Course. In 2022, it was renamed the RAF Intelligence Course (RAFIC). It was first run in the Air Intelligence Wing of DISS in 2000, following the school's move to Chicksands in Bedfordshire. After the first two courses, the Royal Navy was invited to send officers to attend and the course was renamed the Joint Air Intelligence Course (JAIC). In 2005, DISS became part of the Defence College of Intelligence and the Air Intelligence Wing was renamed Horus Training Delivery Wing. Following a re-organisation in 2007, the structure was changed again and the Defence School of Intelligence (DSI) was set up with Air Intelligence Wing as a sub-organisation as the Phase 2 training unit (professional specialist training) for all RAF Intelligence Analyst Airmen, RAF Intelligence Officers, plus as a Phase 3 training unit (Continuation Specialist Training) for RAF Intelligence Analyst NCOs and Royal Navy and British Army Officers employed in air intelligence duties.

On 16 August 2024, the UK's first Intelligence, Surveillance and Reconnaissance (ISR) satellite, named Tyche, was launched. A technology demonstrator satellite had been launched in 2018.

== Training ==
Entrants to the specialisation undertake common training at RAF College Cranwell for officers and RAF Halton for airmen. Following initial training, entrants are posted to the Joint Intelligence Training Group (JITG) Chicksands, in Shefford, Bedfordshire for specialist training.

The Air Intelligence Wing of the Defence School of Intelligence (DSI) delivers the Joint Air Intelligence Course (JAIC) to officers and the Operational Air Intelligence Course (OpAIC) to airmen. These courses prepare the individual for posting to intelligence roles. After completion of the first tour of duty, airmen can choose to further specialise in Imagery or Signals Analysis. These Phase 2 specialist courses are delivered in the joint environment alongside intelligence specialists of the Royal Navy, British Army or Ministry of Defence civil servants.

Further training courses are provided throughout a career, in; Intelligence Mission Support, Collections Management, Cyber Warfare, Human Intelligence, PsyOps, ISR Management; including the QWI ISR Course and Targeting.

== Staff roles and trades ==
Entrants to the branch are initially trained as general intelligence analysts and can later sub-specialise in one of a number of trades. Personnel in each sub-specialisation can be employed in a number of locations.

=== Officer sub-specialisation ===
- Generalist Air Intelligence officer: Squadron Intelligence Officer, Station Intelligence Officer, Air Intelligence Centre (AIC) Analyst
- Staff Officer (Intelligence): JFC, JFIG, PJHQ, Air Command, AWC, 1 Group, JFACHQ
- Command Officer (Intelligence)
- Intelligence, Surveillance & Reconnaissance (ISR) Manager
- Collections Manager
- Human Intelligence (HUMINT) Operator
- Targeteer: Kinetic Targets and Information Operations

=== Airmen/Non-commissioned officer sub-specialisation ===
- Generalist air intelligence analyst
- Generalist Joint intelligence analyst
- Imagery analyst
- Mission Intelligence Coordinator
- Signal intelligence analyst
- Human intelligence operator
- Linguist (Int An (V))

As with all RAF trades and sub-specialisations personnel can be employed in a range of locations within the trade or in the wider organisation. These can include:

- Defence Intelligence
- Operational HQ Intelligence – PJHQ, JFACHQ, NATO, other service exchange
- Air Warfare Centre
- Joint Force Intelligence Group – Defence Intelligence Fusion Centre
- Station Intelligence – Air Command flying stations
- Squadron Intelligence – Flying squadrons
- Defence HUMINT Unit (DHU)
- Instructional duties

== Heads of RAF Intelligence ==
Heads of RAF Intelligence have been:

- Air Vice-Marshal Charles E.H. Medhurst (March 1941 – October 1942)
- Air Vice-Marshal Francis F. Inglis (October 1942 – August 1945)
- Air Vice-Marshal Sir Thomas W. Elmhirst (August 1945 – January 1947)
- Air Vice-Marshal Lawrence F. Pendred (January 1947 – January 1950)
- Air Vice-Marshal Neill C. Ogilvie-Forbes (January 1950 – May 1952)
- Air Vice-Marshal Francis J. Fressanges (May 1952 – September 1954)
- Air Vice-Marshal William M.L. MacDonald (September 1954 – August 1958)
- Air Vice-Marshal Sidney O. Bufton (August 1958 – September 1961)
- Air Vice-Marshal Alick Foord-Kelcey (September 1961 – December 1964)
- Air Vice-Marshal Harold J. Maguire (December 1964 – April 1965)

== Former members of RAF Intelligence ==
- F.F.E. Yeo-Thomas GC, MC & Bar Legion of Honour Croix de Guerre, RAF Intelligence Officer and SOE Agent during WWII, captured and tortured by the Gestapo before being sent to Buchenwald concentration camp, awarded the George Cross.
- Constance Babington Smith MBE Legion of Merit FRSL, author and journalist (WAAF Photographic Interpreter – credited with the discovery of the V1 Programme)
- Noor Inayat Khan GC, WAAF Section Officer and SOE Agent during WWII, captured and executed, posthumously awarded the George Cross
- Sarah Churchill (Baroness Audley), actress and Winston Churchill’s daughter (WAAF Photographic Interpreter during WWII)
- Peter Calvocoressi, British lawyer, historian and publisher (RAF intelligence officer at Bletchley Park during WW2)
- Michael Bentine CBE, comedian and actor (RAF Intelligence Officer during WWII)
- Sir Christopher Lee CBE CStJ, actor (RAF Intelligence Officer during WW2)
- Pam Ayres MBE, poet, comedian, songwriter and presenter (WRAF Plotter Aerial Photography)
- Alex Coomber, former British Olympic Women's Skeleton bobsledder - Bronze Medal at 2002 Winter Olympics (RAF Intelligence Officer)
- Vera Elkan, South African photographer and filmmaker.
- Stuart Gilbert former Director of National Savings in the 1980s. (Served in Burma as a linguist in WW2).
- Cecil Gould, art historian and former Deputy Director of the National Gallery (RAF Intelligence Officer during WW2)
- Sir Max Mallowan CBE, archaeologist and the second husband of Agatha Christie. (RAF Intelligence Officer during WW2)
- Dennis Wheatley, author (RAF Intelligence Officer during WW2)
- Tony Scannell, actor (RAF Intelligence Analyst)
- Jackie Gunn, British bobsledder, Silver Medalist in 2005 World Championships (RAF Intelligence Analyst)
- F.R. Chappell, author (RAF Intelligence Officer on a Wellington Bomber Squadron during WW2)
- F. W. Winterbotham, author (RAF Intelligence Officer during WW2, responsible for devising the system for secure dissemination of Ultra)

Former military members

- Air Chief Marshal Sir Claude Pelly
- Air Chief Marshal Sir John Steel
- Air Marshal Sir Victor Goddard
- Air Vice-Marshal Alan Ritchie
- Air Cdre Archibald Boyle MC OBE CMG, WW2 Director RAF Intelligence and SOE Director of Intelligence & Security
- Teddy Pilley, RAF Intelligence Officer and linguist at Bletchley Park (founder of the International Association of Conference Interpreters, the Institute of Linguists and principal of the Linguists' Club)
- Sqn Ldr M.J. Stanley, last Officer Commanding of the RAF Intelligence School (1969)

== Members of RAF Intelligence in Fiction ==
- "Skull" Selton, character in Derek Robinson's Piece of Cake
- Flt Lt Sandy MacDonald "RAF Intelligence", character in The Great Escape (film) played by Gordon Jackson (actor)
- Terence Alexander, played an RAF Intelligence Officer in the 1957 film The One That Got Away.
- Wing commander David Dobson, an RAF Investigator, is the main character featured in the 1978 novel "The Dancing Dodo" by spy and thriller author John Gardner (British writer). Set in London in 1976, Dobson is paired with a USAF Colonel from the U.S. Embassy and tasked with investigating the air crash of a Martin B-26 Marauder that went missing 30 years earlier during World War II. Its wreck and the bodies of six crew members are discovered in Romney Marsh in south-east England. A routine task becomes complicated when it's discovered that the crew members are still alive.

== See also ==
- British intelligence agencies
- Signals Intelligence
- Imagery Intelligence
- Intelligence, surveillance, target acquisition, and reconnaissance
- QWI ISR

== Sources ==
- Dylan, Huw (2014). Defence Intelligence and the Cold War: Britain's Joint Intelligence Bureau 1945-1964. Oxford University Press. ISBN 978-0199657025.
- Pitchfork, Graham (2003). Shot Down and on the Run: The RAF and Commonwealth Aircrews Who Got Home from Behind Enemy Lines, 1940-1945. PRO Publications. ISBN 978-1903365533.
