= FEAF =

FEAF may refer to:

- Federal Enterprise Architecture Framework
- Far East Air Force, which may refer to:
  - Far East Air Force (Royal Air Force)
  - Far East Air Force (United States)
