= Christopher Foxley-Norris =

Royal Air Force Air Chief Marshal (1917–2003)

Sir Christopher Foxley-Norris
- Foxley-Norris in RAF uniform in the 1970s
- Born: Christopher Neil Foxley-Norris; 16 March 1917; Birkenhead, Cheshire
- Died: 28 September 2003 (aged 86); Northend Common, Stonor
- Military career
- Allegiance: United Kingdom
- Branch: Royal Air Force
- Service years: 1936–1974
- Rank: Air Chief Marshal
- Commands: Second Tactical Air Force (1968–70); No. 224 Group RAF (1964–67); RAF West Malling (1959–60); RAF Stradishall (1958–59); Oxford University Air Squadron (1948–51); No. 14 Squadron RAF (1945–46); No. 143 Squadron RAF (1945); No. 603 Squadron RAF (1944)
- Conflicts: Second World War
- Awards: Knight Grand Cross of the Order of the Bath; Distinguished Service Order; Officer of the Order of the British Empire; Mentioned in Despatches
- Other work: Chairman (1974–82) & President (2001–03), Leonard Cheshire Foundation; Chairman, Battle of Britain Fighter Association (1978-03)

Air Chief Marshal Sir Christopher Neil Foxley-Norris, GCB, DSO, OBE, FRSA (16 March 1917 – 28 September 2003) was a senior commander in the Royal Air Force (RAF). A squadron commander during the Second World War, he later served as Commander-in-Chief RAF Germany in the late 1960s.

== Early life ==
Christopher Neil Foxley-Norris was born on 16 March 1917, a younger son of Major John Percivall Foxley-Norris (1886–1924) and his wife, Dorothy Brabant Smith. His paternal grandfather was the clergyman William Foxley Norris, who served as Dean of Westminster. He was educated at Winchester College and then Trinity College, Oxford, where he read law. He joined the Oxford University Air Squadron in 1936. Foxley-Norris was awarded a Harmsworth scholarship (worth £200) to read for the Bar. The outbreak of war prevented him from taking his final exams. The Bar Council requested the money back, but Foxley-Norris made an arrangement with them that he would leave it to them in his will.

== Second World War ==
Foxley-Norris was commissioned in the Royal Air Force Volunteer Reserve after graduating and was called up for active service in 1939. He undertook initial flying training at No. 9 Flying Training School at RAF Hullavington and completed the training at No 1 School of Army Co-operation. His first posting on completion of training was to No. 13 Squadron RAF flying Lysanders in the Battle of France.

Following the fall of France and the start of the Battle of Britain, the need for Army Co-operation pilots was greatly reduced while that for fighter pilots was increased. As such, Foxley-Norris was posted to No. 3 Squadron flying Hurricanes from RAF Turnhouse.

He was awarded the Distinguished Service Order for his actions, published in the London Gazette on 29 May 1945:

Air Ministry, 29th May, 1945.

The KING has been graciously pleased to approve the following awards in recognition of gallantry and devotion to duty in the execution of air operations: —

Distinguished Service Order.

Acting Wing Commander Christopher Neil FOXLEY-NORRIS (70225), RAFVR, 143 Sqn.

This officer has a long and distinguished record of operational flying. He has completed numerous sorties on his third tour of duty during which period he has operated against a wide range of enemy targets. For several months this officer has commanded the squadron. During the period numerous attacks have been made against enemy targets. By his brilliant leadership, exceptional skill and determination, Wing Commander Foxley-Norris has contributed in good measure to the successes obtained.

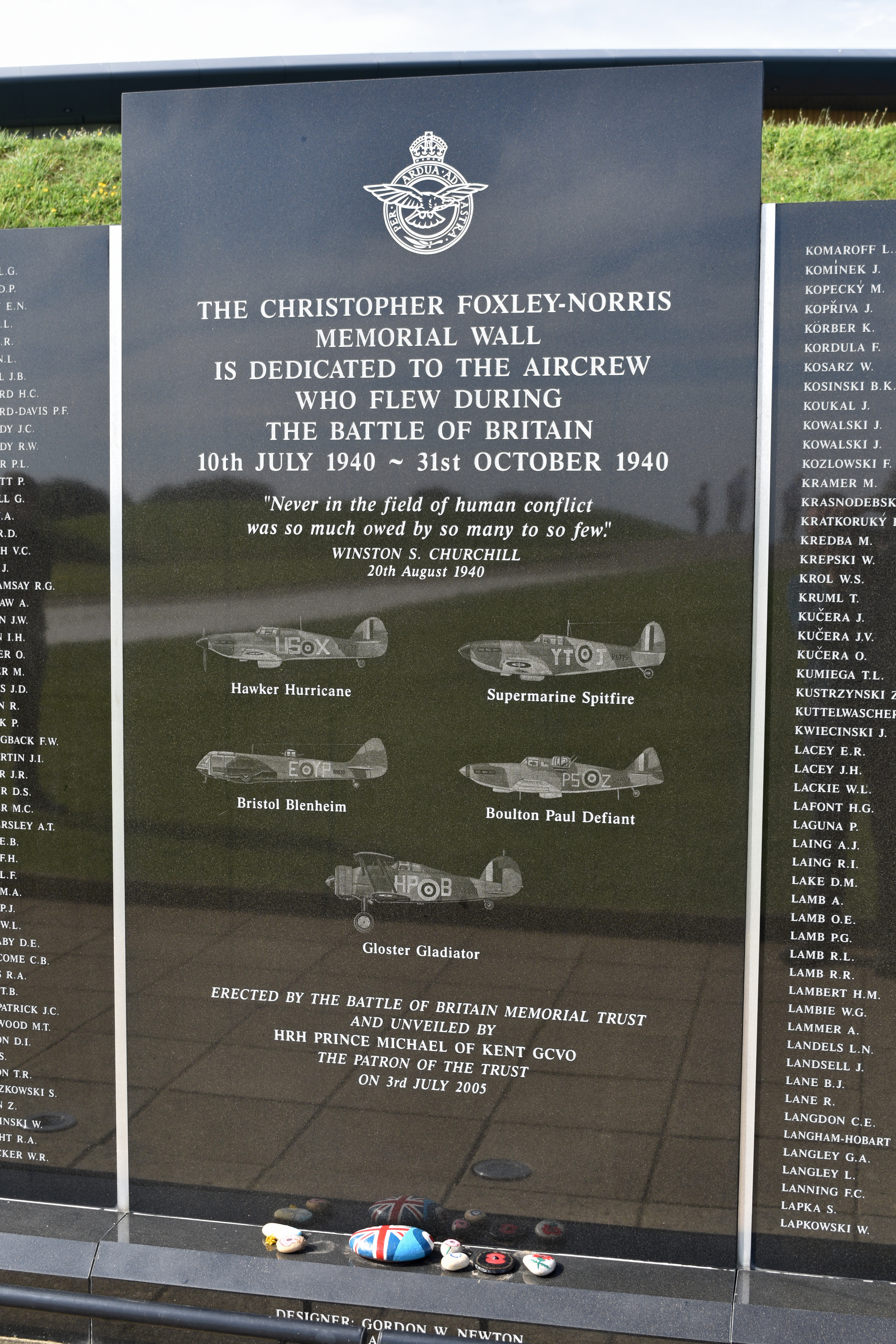
Middle panel of the Christopher Foxley-Norris Memorial Wall at the Battle of Britain Memorial, Capel-le-Ferne, Kent. Unveiled in July 2005, it lists all Royal Air Force aircrew known to have flown at least one sortie during the Battle of Britain.

== Post-war RAF career ==
After the war, Foxley-Norris became station commander at RAF Stradishall and then at RAF West Malling. He undertook the Senior Officers' War Course at the Royal Naval College, Greenwich, and a course at the Imperial Defence College (now the Royal College of Defence Studies) in Belgrave Square in 1961. He went on to be Director of Organisation at the Air Ministry in 1962, Assistant Chief of the Defence Staff in 1963 and Air Officer Commanding No. 224 Group in 1964.

In 1967, Foxley-Norris was appointed Director-General of RAF Organisation at the newly unified Ministry of Defence. He was promoted to air marshal and took command of RAF Germany and of the 2nd Tactical Air Force in 1968. Foxley-Norris was knighted in the 1969 New Year Honours. His final post, with the rank of air chief marshal, was Chief of Personnel and Logistics in 1971. He retired from active service in 1974.

Foxley-Norris was one of the umpires for the 1974 Sandhurst wargame on Operation Sea Lion.

UK pro-smoking lobby organisation FOREST was launched on 19 June 1979, with Foxley-Norris as its chairman. Foxley-Norris retired as the organisation's public figurehead in 1989, and was replaced by Lord Harris of High Cross.

== Family ==
Foxley-Norris married Joan (née Lovell Hughes, now Lady Foxley-Norris) in 1948. They had no children. Joan served as a nurse during the war, and worked with injured pilots. Following his death, she took his place at many Battle of Britain events which were held and was also a regular visitor to RAF Benson.

His funeral took place at St Mary Devoted at Turville, near Stokenchurch, on 7 October 2003. Memorial services were held at Westminster Abbey on 29 January 2004 and at St. Clement Danes, the Central Church of the Royal Air Force, London in April 2004.

== Bibliography ==
- Foxley-Norris, Christopher (1978). A Lighter Shade of Blue: The Lighthearted Memoirs of an Air Marshal. London: I. Allan. ISBN 978-0-71100-858-8.

Military offices
Preceded by Frank Headlam	Air Officer Commanding No. 224 Group; 1964–1967	Succeeded by Brian Eaton
Preceded by Sir Denis Spotswood	Commander-in-Chief RAF Germany; Also Commander of the Second Tactical Air Force; 1968–1970	Succeeded by Harold Martin
Preceded by Sir Charles Harington	Chief of Personnel and Logistics at the Ministry of Defence; 1971–1974	Succeeded by Sir Richard Ward
