= Francis Fressanges =

Sir Francis Fressanges
- Born: 27 February 1902
- Died: 17 October 1975 (aged 73)
- Military career
- Allegiance: United Kingdom
- Branch: Royal Air Force
- Service years: 1921–1957
- Rank: Air Marshal
- Commands: Far East Air Force (1954–57); British Forces Aden (1950–52); No. 47 Group (1944–46); No. 95 Squadron (1941); No. 210 Squadron (1940); No. 84 Squadron (1935–37)
- Conflicts: Second World War
- Awards: Knight Commander of the Order of the British Empire; Companion of the Order of the Bath; Mentioned in Despatches; Legionnaire of the Legion of Merit (United States)

Air Marshal Sir Francis Joseph Fressanges, KBE, CB (27 February 1902 – 17 October 1975) was a senior Royal Air Force officer who served as Air Officer Commanding-in-Chief at Far East Air Force from 1954 to 1957.

== RAF career ==
Fressanges joined the Royal Air Force (RAF) as a cadet in 1921. He served with No. 28 Squadron during North West Frontier operations. He was appointed Officer Commanding No. 84 Squadron in 1935 and then became a Staff Officer in the Directorate of Training at the Air Ministry. He served in the Second World War as Officer Commanding No. 210 Squadron and then as Officer Commanding No. 95 Squadron before becoming deputy director and then Director of Overseas Operations at the Air Ministry. He completed his war service as Air Officer Commanding No. 47 Group.

After the war Fressanges was appointed director of operations at the Air Ministry and then Air Officer Commanding British Forces Aden before taking over as Assistant Chief of the Air Staff (Intelligence) at the Air Ministry in 1952. He became Air Officer Commanding-in-Chief at Far East Air Force in 1954 and retired in 1957.

== Death ==
He died in October 1975.

Military offices
Preceded by Alick Stevens	Air Officer Commanding British Forces Aden; 1950–1952	Succeeded by Douglas Macfadyen
Preceded by Neill Ogilvie-Forbes	Assistant Chief of the Air Staff (Intelligence); 1952–1954	Succeeded by William MacDonald
Preceded by Sir Clifford Sanderson	Commander-in-Chief Far East Air Force; 1954–1957	Succeeded by The Earl of Bandon
