= Brian Eaton =

Royal Australian Air Force senior commander (1916–1992)

Brian Alexander Eaton
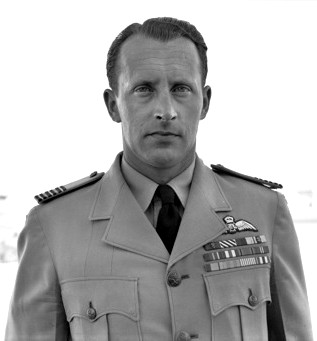
- Brian Eaton in Malta, early 1950s
- Born: 15 December 1916; Launceston, Tasmania
- Died: 17 October 1992 (aged 75); Canberra
- Military career
- Allegiance: Australia
- Service/branch: Royal Australian Air Force
- Service years: 1936–1973
- Rank: Air Vice-Marshal
- Nickname: "The Boss"
- Units: No. 21 Squadron (1937–38); Central Flying School (1940–41)
- Commands: No. 3 Squadron (1943–44); No. 239 Wing RAF (1944–45); No. 81 Wing (1947–48); No. 78 Wing (1951–54); RAAF Base Williamtown (1957–59); No. 224 Group RAF (1967–68); Operational Command (1973)
- Conflicts: World War II; North African campaign; Battle of Tunisia; Italian campaign; Allied invasion of Sicily; Allied invasion of Italy; Battle of Monte Cassino
- Awards: Companion of the Order of the Bath; Commander of the Order of the British Empire; Distinguished Service Order & Bar; Distinguished Flying Cross; Silver Star (US)
- Other work: Regional Executive, Rolls-Royce

Air Vice-Marshal Brian Alexander Eaton, CB, CBE, DSO & Bar, DFC (15 December 1916 – 17 October 1992) was a senior commander in the Royal Australian Air Force (RAAF). Born in Tasmania and raised in Victoria, he joined the RAAF in 1936 and was promoted to flight lieutenant on the outbreak of World War II. He held training positions before being posted to No. 3 Squadron at the beginning of 1943, flying P-40 Kittyhawk fighter-bombers in North Africa. Despite being shot down three times within ten days soon after arriving, Eaton quickly rose to become the unit's commanding officer, and by year's end had been awarded the Distinguished Flying Cross. His leadership earned him the Distinguished Service Order and Bar in 1944–45, and command of No. 239 Wing RAF in Italy, with the temporary rank of group captain. He was also awarded the US Silver Star in 1946 in recognition of his war service.

In the decade following World War II, Eaton led No. 81 Wing in Japan, and No. 78 Wing in Malta. He commanded RAAF Base Williamtown from 1957 to 1959, after which he was appointed a Commander of the Order of the British Empire. As Director-General of Operational Requirements in 1965, Eaton argued for increased RAAF co-operation with the Australian Army in light of growing involvement in the Vietnam War. He was promoted to air vice-marshal the next year, and became Deputy Chief of the Air Staff. Posted to Singapore as Air Officer Commanding (AOC) No. 224 Group RAF in 1967, he was appointed a Companion of the Order of the Bath for his work as chief of staff at Headquarters RAF Far East Air Force in 1969. He then served as Air Member for Personnel, before being selected as AOC Operational Command in 1973. Eaton retired from the RAAF in December that year, and became an executive for Rolls-Royce in Canberra. He died in 1992 at the age of 75.

== Early career ==
Brian Eaton was born in Launceston, Tasmania, on 15 December 1916, to Sydney and Hilda Eaton. The family later moved to Canterbury, Victoria, and Brian was educated at Carey Baptist Grammar School. His early ambition to be a doctor was curtailed when his father died and he had to leave school early. He enlisted as an air cadet in the Royal Australian Air Force (RAAF) on 20 January 1936, undergoing flying training at RAAF Station Point Cook. Eaton was commissioned as a pilot officer upon graduation from flying school in January 1937, and posted to No. 1 Squadron. Within six months he was promoted to flying officer and joined No. 21 Squadron at RAAF Station Laverton. In 1938, he became an instructor at Point Cook's No. 1 Flying Training School, where he also took part in the RAAF's early long navigation exercises. He was promoted to flight lieutenant on 1 September 1939.

== World War II ==
=== Early war service ===
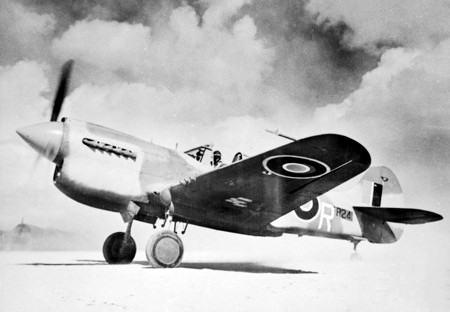
P-40 Kittyhawk of No. 3 Squadron RAAF during the North African campaign

In April 1940, Eaton was assigned to the newly re-formed Central Flying School at Camden, New South Wales, as an instructor. Promoted to temporary squadron leader in September 1940, he was transferred to the Directorate of Training in June 1941. He became a fighter controller at No. 5 Fighter Sector Headquarters, Darwin, Northern Territory, in March 1942. In October that year, he departed Australia for North Africa via India and the United Kingdom, fearful that the fighting would be over before he arrived. He posted in to No. 1 Middle East Training School in January 1943 before taking up duties with No. 3 Squadron RAAF, which was then engaged in the Battle of Tunisia.

Eaton's combat career began inauspiciously, when he was shot down three times in the space of ten days. On the first occasion, his P-40 Kittyhawk was hit by 20 mm cannon shells from an enemy fighter that he never saw. He later recalled, "I was too busy getting the kite down to be frightened. But my God was I surprised." Eaton brought his crippled aircraft in for a forced landing at El Hamma—in the midst of a tank battle between German and New Zealand forces. After the fighting had died down he made his way over to the New Zealanders, who gave him a lift back to his air base. The second time he was shot down, his plane was struck by 88 mm anti-aircraft fire, necessitating another crash landing, this time behind enemy lines. Sympathetic Arab tribesmen smuggled him past the Germans and back to his airfield. Two days later, his P-40 was hit by fire from an Messerschmitt Bf 109 that dived at him from out of the sun. He was able to glide back to base, 80 miles (130 km) away, but on arriving found that it was under attack by German bombers. He decided he had no other option than to land the damaged plane among the exploding bombs, and managed to do so without mishap. His series of narrow escapes engendered a spirit of fatalism, and a habit of keeping his emotions severely in check while on duty: "I just couldn't see myself living when so many were dying. It was something which, at the time, didn't bear much dwelling on."

=== Squadron and wing command ===
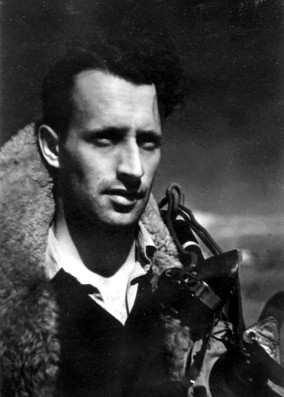
Squadron Leader Eaton as commanding officer of No. 3 Squadron, Tunisia, May 1943

Despite his early setbacks in combat, Eaton soon rose to command No. 3 Squadron, taking over from Squadron Leader Bobby Gibbes on 21 April 1943. He led the unit as it relocated to Malta the following month, in preparation for the Allied invasion of Sicily. Illness forced him to hand over command in June–July, but he returned to take charge of the squadron in August as it continued to fly escort and interdiction missions in Sicily with other units of No. 239 Wing RAF. His brother Roger, a flight sergeant serving with the RAF, was killed in a Wellington bomber raid during the campaign. On 3 September, No. 3 Squadron took part in the opening day of the Allied invasion of Italy, supporting the British XIII Corps as it moved inland after landing at Calabria. Enemy air resistance remained light and worthwhile ground targets few as the campaign progressed but, on 24 October, Eaton led an attack against German shipping off the Yugoslav coast that left a merchant ship and two barges on fire. He repeated the exercise on 7 November, when the squadron scored hits on vessels in two separate raids in the harbour at Split. On 19 November, when the rest of No. 239 Wing was unable to complete any missions due to adverse weather, Eaton found a hole in the clouds and led eight Kittyhawks in a successful attack on Opi in central Italy. He was promoted to temporary wing commander on 1 December. On 14 December, he was awarded the Distinguished Flying Cross for pressing home a night attack on Axis armour at Termoli. The citation was promulgated in the London Gazette:

One evening in October, 1943, this officer led his squadron in an attack on a strong enemy force, equipped with tanks, which were attacking our troops near Termoli. In spite of intense antiaircraft fire, Squadron Leader Eaton led his formation in at a low level and pressed home an attack which completely disrupted the enemy's forces. In this spirited action, Squadron Leader Eaton displayed inspiring leadership, great courage and tenacity.

On 16 February 1944, the day after the contentious destruction of Monte Cassino, Eaton took No. 3 Squadron through a break in the bad weather to attack the ruined monastery, the only one of No. 239 Wing's units to successfully bomb its target that day. He handed over command of No. 3 Squadron later that month, and was transferred to No. 1 Mobile Operations Room Unit as forward air controller for the final assault on Monte Cassino. The run of luck that Eaton experienced in his first weeks of air combat in Tunisia continued on the ground in Italy. He survived three months of constant artillery fire, including an occasion when a shell exploded directly above his observation post, striking down a British officer standing next to him. He also came under machine-gun fire when he took a wrong turn one day and drove into the German lines, but again escaped unhurt. He was awarded the Distinguished Service Order on 7 April, in recognition of his leadership of No. 3 Squadron in North Africa, Malta, Sicily and Italy.

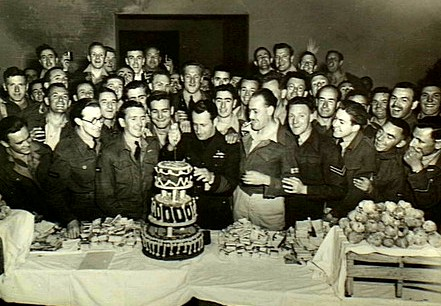
Acting Group Captain Eaton (centre, cutting cake) and personnel of No. 239 Wing, at the formation's third anniversary celebration in Fano, Italy, 28 April 1945

Raised to acting group captain, Eaton was given command of No. 239 Wing on 3 August 1944, taking responsibility for No. 3 Squadron and No. 450 Squadron RAAF, No. 112 Squadron and No. 260 Squadron RAF, No. 5 Squadron of the South African Air Force, and No. 250 Squadron of the Royal Rhodesian Air Force. Credited with leading "many outstanding raids", he was known to his staff as "The Boss", and often flew twice a day with a different squadron on each mission; when his superiors found out how many sorties he was personally undertaking and ordered him to cut back, he simply ceased recording his flying hours. The wing's two RAF squadrons had already re-equipped with P-51 Mustangs when Eaton took over; No. 5 converted in September and No. 3 in November. As well as supporting the Eighth Army in Italy, the Mustang units carried out missions in Yugoslavia in concert with the Balkan Air Force, prior to Axis forces surrendering on 2 May.

Eaton was unofficially credited with shooting down as many as seven enemy aircraft during the Mediterranean campaigns, but was never listed among Australian flying aces. Many of the missions that he undertook with No. 3 Squadron and in command of No. 239 Wing were ground attack or anti-shipping sorties, rather than air-to-air combat. He was also known as a leader who, when opportunities did arise to engage other aircraft, would attempt to manoeuvre his rookie pilots into position to make a "kill", rather than take the shot himself. On 12 June, he was awarded a Bar to his Distinguished Service Order for "Outstanding skill and leadership against heavy odds". His war service also earned him the US Silver Star, permission to wear it being gazetted on 14 June 1946.

== Post-war career ==
=== Rise to senior command ===
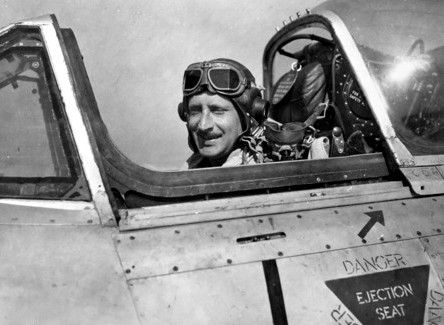
Wing Commander Eaton in a No. 77 Squadron Meteor during a visit to Korea, October 1951

Eaton was posted to Britain following the end of World War II, and attended RAF Staff College the next year. In September 1947, he was appointed Officer Commanding No. 81 (Fighter) Wing in Japan, as part of the British Commonwealth Occupation Force (BCOF). The Australian contingent initially comprised three combat units, Nos. 76, 77 and 82 Squadrons, as well as No. 381 (Base) Squadron, No. 481 (Maintenance) Squadron, No. 111 Mobile Fighter Control Unit, and No. 5 Airfield Construction Squadron. By mid-1949, it had been reduced to No. 77 Squadron alone, and Headquarters BCOF had been disbanded; Eaton served as "RAAF Component" commander for the remainder of his tenure in Japan. As well as surveillance patrols, training and inter-service exercises, the Australian airmen took part in ceremonial flypasts. On one such occasion, over Tokyo, Eaton led his formation of thirty Mustangs into cloud with a faulty artificial horizon in his plane, with the result that he and his comrades, who were following his lead, became badly disorientated and were fortunate to avoid collision; RAAF historian Alan Stephens considered this a not-atypical example of the casual attitude to flying safety exhibited at the time by the veteran pilots of World War II.

Returning to Australia in November 1949, Eaton became Deputy Director of Training at the Department of Air, Canberra, where he remained until 1951. Later that year, he was appointed Officer Commanding No. 78 (Fighter) Wing at RAAF Base Williamtown, New South Wales. He had reverted to a substantive rank of wing commander since leaving Japan, as the RAAF shrank dramatically with demobilisation and many senior officers lost the temporary or acting ranks they had gained in wartime. On 15 September, he landed a Vampire jet fighter at Point Cook with one flat tyre and one wheel retracted, after its undercarriage had become jammed. The plane skidded off the runway but Eaton was able to walk away, reportedly remarking "Well, I didn't wreck it". He married Josephine Rumbles at Toorak Presbyterian Church in Melbourne on 10 May 1952; the couple later had a son and two daughters. Following Britain's request to the Australian government for a Commonwealth garrison in the Mediterranean, in July 1952 Eaton led No. 78 Wing on deployment to RAF Hal Far near Valletta, Malta, where its combat squadrons, Nos. 75 and 76, were equipped with leased Vampire FB9s. As the overseas posting was for a minimum of two years, his new bride and the families of other staff were permitted to make the journey as well. The Australian airmen participated in many NATO exercises while stationed at Malta, and one year took first and second place in the Middle Eastern Gunnery Contest for the "Imshi" Mason Cup. Promoted to the substantive rank of group captain on 1 January 1953, Eaton was granted command of RAF Ta'Kali when the wing transferred there from Hal Far in June.

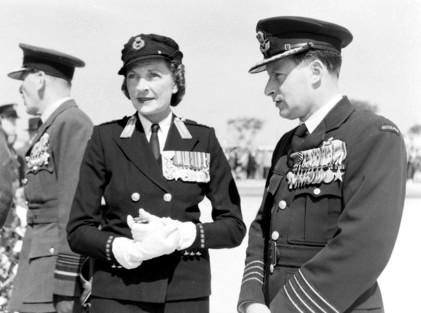
Group Captain Eaton as Officer Commanding No. 78 Wing in Malta, with Countess Edwina Mountbatten, following the Anzac Day service on 25 April 1954

Completing his tour with No. 78 Wing in mid-1954, Eaton joined Air Vice-Marshal Alister Murdoch on an international mission to examine potential new fighter, bomber, transport and training aircraft for the RAAF. The team's report advocated the F-104 Starfighter as a replacement for the CAC Sabre, as well as nuclear-capable British V-bomber strike aircraft to augment Australia's Canberra bombers, and C-130 Hercules transports to replace the C-47 Dakota. The proposals for V-bombers and the F-104 were not taken up, but the Australian Government acquired the C-130 in 1958. Described as second only to the General Dynamics F-111C as the "most significant" purchase by the RAAF, the Hercules gave the Air Force its first strategic airlift capability, which in years to come would provide a "lifeline" to Australian forces deployed to Malaya, Vietnam, and other parts of the South-West Pacific. The mission also recommended the locally built Vampire T35 as a jet trainer for No. 1 Applied Flying Training School; sixty-nine were later delivered by the de Havilland factory in Bankstown, New South Wales. Eaton served as RAAF Director of Operations during 1955–56, and as Officer Commanding RAAF Base Williamtown and commandant of the co-located School of Land/Air Warfare from March 1957 until February 1959. He was appointed a Commander of the Order of the British Empire (CBE) in the 1959 Queen's Birthday Honours.

Following his tour at Williamtown, Eaton spent two years as Director of Joint Services Plans before attending the Imperial Defence College, London in 1961. Raised to air commodore, he was appointed Director-General Operational Requirements in 1962. Concurrently he became an honorary aide-de-Camp to Queen Elizabeth II, in which capacity he served until 1965. As the Army reorganised to deal with Australia's increasing commitments to the Vietnam War in the mid-1960s, it sought to procure a dozen twin-engined aircraft of a size hitherto operated only by the RAAF, and also proposed a joint review of close air support. RAAF senior command chose to deal with the Army's proposals by ignoring them. As Director-General of Operational Requirements, Eaton argued that if the RAAF did not more fully satisfy the ground support requirements of the Army, then the Army itself would seek to take control of this sphere of operations, undermining the RAAF's position as the main provider of Australia's air power. Pointing out to the Chief of the Air Staff, Air Marshal Murdoch, that it was "clearly the Army's intention to have complete command and control" of air-to-ground assets, he warned of a parallel situation in America, where the US Army was looking to take over all battlefield air support in response to the USAF failing to keep up to date in the provision of basic attack aircraft. The RAAF's refusal to adequately deal with its ground support responsibilities led to long-running inter-service enmity, and contributed to the Australian government's decision twenty years later to transfer control of battlefield helicopters to the Army. At this time, Eaton also led the acquisition team that selected the Macchi MB-326 as the RAAF's new jet trainer, as it met all requirements, could be licence-built in Australia, and was relatively inexpensive. The first of ninety-seven was delivered by the Commonwealth Aircraft Corporation in 1967.

=== Senior command and retirement ===
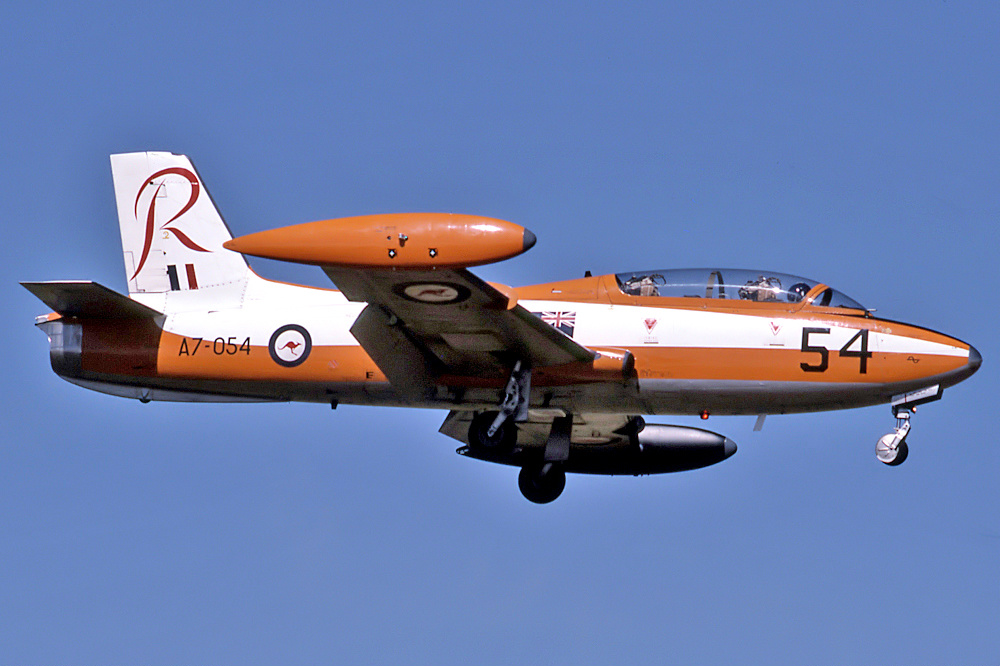
Macchi MB-326, selected as the RAAF's jet trainer in the mid-1960s by an acquisition team led by Air Commodore Eaton

Promoted to air vice-marshal, Eaton became Deputy Chief of the Air Staff in 1966. In December that year, with Australian Caribou transports and Iroquois helicopters already serving in Vietnam, Eaton advocated building up the RAAF's "sharp end" there, increasing air support for ground troops. He preferred deploying Sabre or Mirage fighters rather than the mooted Canberra bombers, which he saw as more suitable for a strategic role. Above all, he accepted the "domino theory" and believed that if Australia did not aid South Vietnam, "we'd lose the lot". In the event, Canberras were despatched rather than fighters. In 1967, Eaton became the last AOC of No. 224 Group RAF under the British Far East Air Force (FEAF) in Singapore, as permanent squadrons were dropped from its strength. This reorganisation led to him taking over as chief of staff at Headquarters FEAF the following year. In this capacity, he was appointed a Companion of the Order of the Bath (CB) in the 1969 Queen's Birthday Honours.

Returning to Australia, Eaton became Air Member for Personnel (AMP) in October 1969. As AMP, he sat on the Air Board, the RAAF's controlling body, consisting of its most senior officers and chaired by the Chief of the Air Staff. In January 1973, he was appointed AOC Operational Command (now Air Command). He served in this position until retirement, his tenure witnessing the introduction of the F-111C swing-wing bomber to service in Australia, when the first machines touched down at RAAF Base Amberley, Queensland, in July. Leaving the military on 15 December 1973, Eaton became Regional Executive for Rolls-Royce Australia in Canberra. He remained with the company for the next decade, continuing to live in Canberra until his death on 17 October 1992, at the age of 75. In 1996, his widow Josephine donated funding for the Air Vice-Marshal B.A. Eaton 'Airman of the Year' Award to the RAAF, to annually recognise "significant contribution to both the Service and the community" by airmen and airwoman ranked corporal or below.

== Notes ==
Military offices
Preceded by Air Vice-Marshal Bill Townsend	Air Officer Commanding Operational Command; 1973	Succeeded by Air Vice-Marshal Frederick Robey
Preceded by Air Vice-Marshal Christopher Foxley-Norris	Air Officer Commanding No. 224 Group RAF; 1967–1968	Formation disbanded
Preceded by Air Vice-Marshal Frank Headlam	Deputy Chief of the Air Staff; 1966–1967	Succeeded by Air Vice-Marshal Bill Townsend
