= Sierra Leone in World War II =

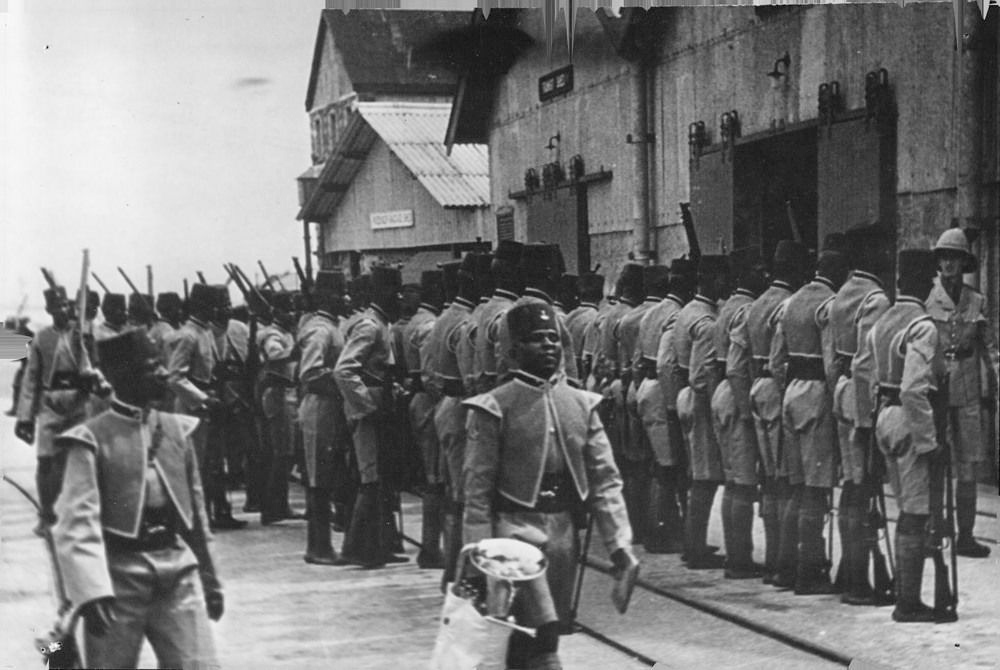
A Sierra Leonean regiment on parade in Freetown, 1939

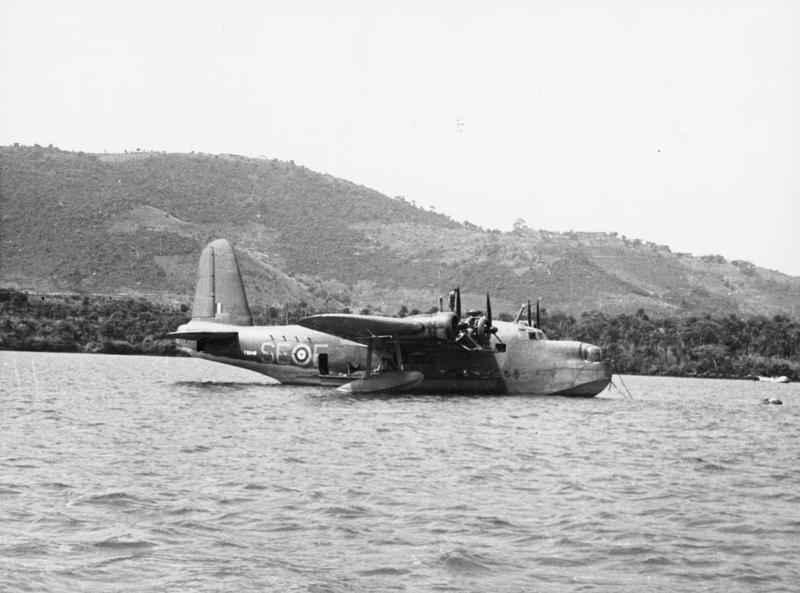
A Short Sunderland of No. 95 Squadron RAF moored in Freetown.

Sierra Leone remained a British colony throughout World War II. As such, it fought alongside the Allies against the Axis. No largescale battles or military action took place in or around Sierra Leone during the war. However, the colony played a critical role in supporting the Allies throughout the conflict, with Freetown acting as an important convoy station.

== History ==
The British prepared Freetown for war as early as 1938, with comprehensive militarization taking place the next year. The United States built military installations and stationed troops in Freetown in 1942 and 1943. At the height of the war, over 200 ships might have been moored in Freetown's harbor, most of them Europe-bound cargo or military vessels. The need for labor at the harbor caused many people in search of employment to flock to the city. In under two years, Freetown's population doubled because of the war. The work was arduous and wages were low, causing Freetown residents working in the harbor to go on strike when food prices began to rise. In addition, the influx of white soldiers caused racial tension to run high in the city during the war. Racially motivated street fighting was common. While most of these war era laborers were male, a significant number of Sierra Leonean women also participated.

Most Sierra Leoneans who enlisted fought in the Burma campaign as part of the Royal West African Frontier Force.

The famous Sierra Leone Creole journalist and founder of the West African Youth League, I.T.A. Wallace-Johnson, notable for his anti-imperialist and Marxist-Leninist views, was arrested when the war began. He was just one of many residents of British West Africa imprisoned by the British for expressing "seditious" views during World War II.

Many British and American troops stationed in Sierra Leone contracted and died from malaria. While death from malaria was common among soldiers around the world during World War II, Sierra Leone saw the highest number of soldiers lose their life to the disease, leading Allied soldiers to refer to Sierra Leone as the "white man's grave".

The political and economic situation of the post-war world eventually allowed Sierra Leone to gain independence from the British Empire in 1961, as part of a much larger trend of decolonization around the world.
