= Clifford Sanderson =

Royal Air Force air marshals (1898–1976)

Sir Clifford Sanderson
- Born: 19 February 1898; Wandsworth, London, England
- Died: 28 January 1976 (aged 77); Hove, Sussex, England
- Military career
- Allegiance: United Kingdom
- Branch: British Army (1916–18); Royal Air Force (1918–55)
- Service years: 1916–1955
- Rank: Air Marshal
- Commands: Far East Air Force (1952–54); AHQ Malaya (1948–49); AHQ Burma (1946–47); RAF Ramlah (1938–40); No. 19 Squadron (1931–34)
- Conflicts: First World War; Second World War; Malayan Emergency
- Awards: Knight Commander of the Order of the British Empire; Companion of the Order of the Bath; Distinguished Flying Cross; Mentioned in Despatches (2)

Air Marshal Sir (Alfred) Clifford Sanderson, KBE, CB, DFC (19 February 1898 – 28 January 1976) was a British Royal Air Force officer who served as Air Officer Commanding Far East Air Force from 1952 to 1954.

== RAF career ==
Educated at Dulwich College, Sanderson joined the Royal Flying Corps in 1916 during the First World War. He transferred to the newly formed Royal Air Force in 1918 and was made Officer Commanding No. 19 Squadron in 1931. He was appointed Station Commander at RAF Ramlah in 1938 and served in the Second World War as Senior Air Staff Officer at Headquarters RAF Palestine and Transjordan and then at RAF Mediterranean before becoming Air Officer Administration at Air Headquarters Egypt. He continued his war service as Director of War Organisation and then as Director of Administrative Plans at the Air Ministry. He was seriously injured in an air crash in February 1945.

In 1946 Sanderson was appointed Air Officer Commanding Air Headquarters Burma and then Air Officer Administration at Headquarters Air Command Far East. He went on to be Air Officer Commanding Air Headquarters Malaya in 1948 and Director-General of Personnel at the Air Ministry in 1949. He became Air Officer Commanding Far East Air Force in 1952 before retiring in 1955.

Military offices
Preceded by Sir Francis Fogarty	Air Officer Commanding-in-Chief Far East Air Force; 1952–1954	Succeeded by Sir Francis Fressanges
