= Far East Air Force =

Far East Air Force may refer to:

- Far East Air Force (Royal Air Force), the British command that controlled all Royal Air Force units in East Asia from 1943 to 1971
- Far East Air Force (United States), the military aviation organization of the United States Army in the Philippine Islands from November 1941 to February 1942
- Pacific Air Forces, a United States Air Force major command known historically as Far East Air Forces from its activation in 1944 until 1945 and again from 1947 to 1957
