= Neill Ogilvie-Forbes =

Royal Air Force officer who served as Assistant Chief of the Air Staff 1950–1952

- Born: 12 December 1900; Aberdeen, Scotland
- Died: 6 February 1990 (aged 89); Buckinghamshire
- Burial place: Amersham, Buckinghamshire
- Military career
- Allegiance: United Kingdom
- Branch: Royal Air Force
- Service years: 1921–1952
- Rank: Air Vice Marshal
- Commands: RAF Ludford Magna (1945); RAF Faldingworth (1944–45); Central Navigation School RAF (1942–44); RAF North Coates (1942)
- Conflicts: Second World War
- Awards: Officer of the Order of the British Empire; Mentioned in Despatches

Air Vice Marshal Neill Charles Ogilvie-Forbes, OBE (12 December 1900 – 6 February 1990) was a senior Royal Air Force officer who served as Assistant Chief of the Air Staff (Intelligence) from 1950 to 1952.

== RAF career ==
Educated at the Oratory School and Trinity College, Cambridge, Neill Ogilvie-Forbes joined the Royal Air Force in 1922. He became a flight commander with No. 13 Squadron in April 1933. He served in the Second World War on secondment to the Royal Iraqi Air Force from January 1939, on the Air Staff at Headquarters No. 15 Group from April 1941 and as deputy director of Operations (Naval Co-operation) from February 1942.

After the Second World War, Ogilvie-Forbes served as Air Attaché in Brussels from September 1945, as Air Attaché in Moscow from April 1948 and as Assistant Chief of the Air Staff (Intelligence) at the Air Ministry from January 1950 prior to retiring of his own volition in July 1952.

Military offices
Preceded by Lawrence Pendred	Assistant Chief of the Air Staff (Intelligence); 1950–1952	Succeeded by Francis Fressanges
