= Francis Fogarty =

Royal Air Force Air Chief Marshal (1899-1973)

Sir Francis Joseph Fogarty
- Born: 16 January 1899; Cork, Ireland
- Died: 12 January 1973 (aged 73); Surrey, England
- Military career
- Allegiance: United Kingdom
- Branch: British Army (1917–18); Royal Air Force (1918–57)
- Service years: 1917–1957
- Rank: Air chief marshal
- Service number: 07091
- Commands: Air Member for Personnel (1952–56); Far East Air Force (1949–52); RAF Italy (1945–46); No. 8 Group (1941–43); RAF Mildenhall (1940–41); No. 37 Squadron (1938–40); No. 84 Squadron (1935–37)
- Conflicts: World War I World War II
- Awards: Knight Grand Cross of the Order of the British Empire; Knight Commander of the Order of the Bath; Distinguished Flying Cross; Air Force Cross; Mentioned in dispatches (4)
- Other work: Director of Racal Electronics; President of the British Airport Construction and Equipment Association; Deputy President of the Air League; Director-General of the English Speaking Union

Air Chief Marshal Sir Francis Joseph Fogarty, GBE, KCB, DFC, AFC (16 January 1899 – 12 January 1973) was a senior commander in the Royal Air Force (RAF) during the Second World War and also in the post-war years. During the First World War he served as a pilot in the Royal Flying Corps. He was transferred to the RAF on its creation in 1918 and remained in the service during the inter-war years.

== Early life and career ==
Francis Fogarty was born in Cork, Ireland, on 16 January 1899 and educated at Farranferris College. In 1917, he joined the Royal Flying Corps as an air mechanic. However, he was soon selected for training as a pilot and was commissioned as a second lieutenant. In 1918, Fogarty served as a pilot on No. 98 Squadron, participating in the Battle of Amiens but having to land with engine trouble before he could bomb German airfields or rail lines.

Remaining in the RAF after the war, Fogarty was soon to see active service again, this time in Iraq. He was posted to No. 84 Squadron, where he continued operational flying gaining a mention in despatches and receiving the Distinguished Flying Cross in 1922 for distinguished service. After spending the mid-1920s as a qualified flying instructor at No. 2 Flying Training School, Fogarty returned to Iraq and No. 84 Squadron in 1928 as a flight commander.

The first half of the 1930s saw Fogarty return to Great Britain, initially as the adjutant and qualified flying instructor on No. 601 (County of London) Squadron and then a short time later carrying out the same roles on No. 604 (County of Middlesex) Squadron, which he was instrumental in establishing with the assistance of a warrant officer and 19 airmen. In 1935, he took up his first command appointment as the Officer Commanding No. 84 Squadron back in Iraq before returning to Great Britain in 1937 to serve on the air staff of the recently formed Bomber Command. The following year he was appointed Officer Commanding No. 37 (Bomber) Squadron at Feltwell in Norfolk.

== Second World War ==
Promoted to wing commander in 1938, Fogarty was advanced to group captain in 1940 and, around the same time, appointed Station Commander of RAF Mildenhall, a bomber station. While at Mildenhall, he appeared in the film "Target for To-night", which won a special Academy Award. On 8 September 1941, he was appointed to lead No. 8 (Bomber) Group within Bomber Command.

In 1943, Fogarty was a member of the RAF mission to Ottawa, and in August 1944, he became the Senior Air Staff Officer at the headquarters of No. 4 Group. Towards the end of the war, he was promoted to acting air vice marshal and made the Air Officer Administration for the Mediterranean Allied Air Forces.

== Post-war ==
After the war, Fogarty was appointed Air Officer Commanding RAF Italy before becoming Air Officer Administration of the RAF Mediterranean and Middle East command in 1946. The following summer, he returned to Great Britain to become the Senior Air Staff Officer at Headquarters Flying Training Command and received a substantive promotion to air vice marshal. From 1949 to 1952, he was Air Officer Commanding-in-Chief the Far East Air Force, dealing with the challenges of the Malayan Emergency and receiving promotion to air marshal in 1950. From 1952 to the end of 1956, he was the RAF's Air Member for Personnel, gaining his final promotion to air chief marshal towards the end of 1953. He retired in January 1957.

In retirement Fogarty became involved in business, as the director of Racal Electronics and also as president of the British Airport Construction and Equipment Association. In addition, he was a deputy president of the Air League and director-general of the English Speaking Union. Fogarty died at his home in Surrey on 12 January 1973.

== Notes ==
Military offices
Preceded by Sir Hugh Lloyd	Air Officer Commanding-in-Chief Far East Air Force; 1949–1952	Succeeded by Sir Clifford Sanderson
Preceded by Sir Leslie Hollinghurst	Air Member for Personnel; 1952–1956	Succeeded by Sir John Whitley
