= Lawrence Pendred =

Royal Air Force Air Marshal (1899-1986)

Sir Lawrence Pendred
- Born: 5 May 1899
- Died: 19 September 1986 (aged 87)
- Military career
- Allegiance: United Kingdom
- Branch: Royal Navy (1917–18); Royal Air Force (1918–55)
- Service years: 1917–1955
- Rank: Air Marshal
- Commands: Flying Training Command (1952–55); School of Land/Air Warfare (1950–52); No. 227 Group (1945); RAF Swinderby (1940–41)
- Conflicts: First World War; Second World War
- Awards: Knight Commander of the Order of the British Empire; Companion of the Order of the Bath; Distinguished Flying Cross; Mentioned in Despatches (3); Grand Cross of the Order of Polonia Restituta (Poland); Commander of the Legion of Merit (United States)

Air Marshal Sir Lawrence Fleming Pendred, KBE, CB, DFC, DL (5 May 1899 – 19 September 1986) was a Royal Air Force officer who became Air Officer Commanding-in-Chief of Flying Training Command from 1952 until his retirement in 1955.

== RAF career ==
Educated at Epsom College, Pendred joined the Royal Naval Air Service in 1917 towards the end of the First World War and served as a pilot with No. 2 Squadron. He specialised in intelligence and in 1930 he joined the Intelligence Staff at Headquarters RAF Transjordan and Palestine. He served in the Second World War on the air staff in the Deputy Directorate of Operations (Home) and then in the Directorate of Plans. He continued his war service as Chief Intelligence Officer at Headquarters RAF Bomber Command from 1941, as Director of Intelligence at the Air Ministry from 1942 and as Chief Intelligence Officer at Headquarters Allied Expeditionary Air Force from 1944. He spent the closing years of the war as Assistant Commandant at the RAF Staff College, Bulstrode Park and then as Air Officer Commanding No. 227 Group.

After the war Pendred was appointed Director of Intelligence to Supreme Commander, South East Asia and then, from 1947, Assistant Chief of the Air Staff (Intelligence). He went on to be commandant at the School of Land/Air Warfare in 1950 and Air Officer Commanding-in-Chief of Flying Training Command in 1952, before retiring in 1955. Under Pendred the standard training sequence for new pilots was the Provost and then the Vampire aircraft types.

In retirement Pendred was President of the Old Epsomian Club.

Military offices
Preceded by Thomas Elmhirst	Assistant Chief of the Air Staff (Intelligence); 1947–1950	Succeeded by Neill Ogilvie-Forbes
Preceded by Sir Hugh Walmsley	Air Officer Commanding-in-Chief Flying Training Command; 1952–1955	Succeeded by Sir Richard Atcherley
