= RAF Chia Keng =

Royal Air Force station in Singapore

- Part of RAF Changi
- Serangoon in Singapore
- Site of RAF Chia Keng in 1957–1958

Site information
- Type: Listening station
- Owner: Royal Air Force
- Controlled by: Royal Air Force; GCHQ

Location
- Location within Singapore
- Coordinates: 1°22′04″N 103°52′23″E

Site history
- In use: 1948–1971
- Fate: Demolished
- Events: Indonesia-Malaysia confrontation Cold War

RAF Chia Keng was a non-flying Royal Air Force station located in Serangoon, Singapore from 1948 to 1971 serving as a satellite station for RAF Changi. It was one of the two British GCHQ radio receiving stations in Singapore, the other one being RAF Jurong which served as a satellite station for RAF Tengah. The station was closed in 1971, later being demolished to make way for housing developments.

== History ==
Chia Keng operated between 1948 and 1971 as a satellite station to RAF Changi and a GCHQ radio receiving station. It was made up of two sections – Chia Keng 1 (CK1) and Chia Keng 2 (CK2). CK1 consisted of the main camp while CK2 was a smaller section containing the GCHQ radio receiving station. CK1 contained bungalows manned by people with top-level security clearances, including around fifty civilians but with no more than four or five per shift. Its purpose was to receive radio signals from RAF stations around the world. CK2 served as one of the British listening stations in the Far East, picking up signals received from the United Kingdom, Kenya, Ceylon (now Sri Lanka) and Hong Kong. It was the first signals-intelligence centre administered by the GCHQ in the Far East, with other previous ones coming under the responsibility of the British Armed Forces, most of which came under the responsibility of the RAF.

Chia Keng had elaborate aerial masts that were able to pick up sensitive signals. According to Derek Lehrle, a former worker at the station, they were strung up in groups of four, allowing for the best reception. Incoming signals were then fed to the camp's receiving hall via cable. The receiving hall contained the radio equipment used for collecting the signals, which were then transmitted to Changi via landlines. Single sideband, double sideband and frequency-shift keying radio waves were used by the RAF and they were processed at the receiving hall.

Chia Keng originally consisted of a large house serving as a receiving station for signals received from various other RAF stations around the world, up until the Chia Keng camp opened in 1951, creating a listening station administered by the GCHQ. After British forces pulled out from Singapore in 1971, it was closed and has since been demolished to make way for Housing and Development Board (HDB) flats in Serangoon New Town.

=== Cold War ===
Described as "the nerve centre of British defence forces east of the Suez" by Richard J. Aldrich, a professor at the University of Warwick, Singapore was used as a hub for British intelligence in the Far East during the Cold War to base its activities across Southeast Asia. Singapore had the regional headquarters of the Joint Intelligence Committee, the intelligence directorates of the British army, navy and air force, a signals intelligence site and an image intelligence centre, among others. Britain's allies, including the United States, France, Australia and the Netherlands, also maintained a presence in Singapore. There was concern among British intelligence services of the potential activities of Soviet and Chinese spies but there was little evidence for their presence.

During the Indonesia-Malaysia confrontation, also known as the Konfrontasi, Chia Keng was used to break and read Indonesian codes. Due to its location, it could get direct reports about developments in Indonesia. According to Duncan Campbell, Indonesia had used sabotaged cypher machines supplied by the Swiss company Crypto AG which had built-in back doors for GCHQ and the CIA, allowing them to decode and read secret Indonesian messages "without difficulty". With its spies based in Singapore, Britain took advantage of a failed coup by the 30 September Movement that resulted in the murder of six senior Indonesian generals. The British encouraged the Indonesian Army campaign of mass killings after the attempted coup, through spreading anti-Communist propaganda and material. Such content was used to inflame and encourage the destruction of the Communist Party of Indonesia (PKI). Hundreds of thousands of members of the PKI were murdered. According to Norman Reddaway the GCHQ material at Chia Keng could have helped Indonesian generals to persecute the PKI. This was done to undermine Sukarno and his government and to try to end the Indonesia-Malaysia confrontation, a conflict over the creation of the Federation of Malaysia. The conflict ended after Sukarno relinquished his power to Suharto.

== Current site ==
After British forces withdrew from Singapore, the site was demolished and was then built on during the mid-1980s for a housing development project. The site is filled with HDB flats along Serangoon North Avenue 1 near Serangoon Gardens and Japanese Cemetery Park. The station was also located near Yio Chu Kang Road, a major road in Singapore.

== See also ==
- List of former Royal Air Force stations
