= Linguists' Club =

Former language club in London, England

The Linguists' Club was a language club located in London, which operated between 1932 and 1971.

== History ==
The Club acted as a meeting place and school for linguists, including interpreters, translators, language students, and other members who merely wanted to practise their language skills. The club's motto was Se comprendre, c'est la paix (Mutual understanding is peace).

The club's owner and principal was Teddy Pilley. The club was initially located on Kingsway near to Holborn tube station, and then later in premises at 20 Grosvenor Place (this was the postal address, but the club's entrance was actually in the mews at the rear at 8/9 Chester Close).

The Club provided language classes and less-formal discussion groups in a number of languages, including French, German, Italian, Spanish, Russian, and Esperanto. The discussion groups could cover any number of topics, except politics and sex. The Linguists' Club was open 6 days a week, from 11 am to 11 pm. There was a snack bar, no alcohol was served. There was a TV room, a ping-pong room, a small cinema for showing foreign-language films, and Friday evening dances to records. Just after World War II, some Club dances were held on the roof-garden of the Chester Close location, illuminated by coloured light bulbs. For a time, in the 1940s, 1950s and 1960s, the Club organised trips abroad for members, and there were also visits to a social venue near Leatherhead, Surrey, known as Surrey Crest.

In the early days of the club's life, Teddy Pilley facilitated so called Working Parties, to help train aspiring interpreters. An active Translation Bureau was also established, to provide commercial services to the general public.

Membership in the Linguists' Club could be purchased for periods from one month to a year. Members could opt to suspend membership for periods of absence from the country. There was a Life Membership fee of 100 guineas, and many took this option. There was also a guest membership of one day. The last register of members listed membership numbers in the 70,000s.

Under the co-editorship of Teddy Pilley and Hilda Westron, the Linguists' Club published a monthly magazine, The Linguist, which had world-wide circulation.

The Club expanded in the 1950s to include a second location at Niddry Lodge, near to Kensington High Street. Programming included a School of English to help international members learn English. Niddry Lodge had been built in the early 1800s. There was far more room for activities that could not be held at Chester Close. The Lodge had a 1 acre garden (the largest private garden in Kensington at the time), where classes/discussion groups were held in warm weather. There was also a ballroom where Scottish dancing and fencing lessons were held. Niddry Lodge was on a lease from Kensington Council, and when that expired the Lodge was demolished to make way for the new Kensington and Chelsea Town Hall. Some of the trees in the town hall courtyard are from the Lodge's garden.
