= Changi Air Base =

Military airbase of the Republic of Singapore Air Force

Changi Air Base Pangkalan Udara Changi (Malay) 樟宜空軍基地 (Chinese) சாங்கி வான்படைத் தளம் (Tamil)
- Badge of the Changi Air Base
- IATA: SIN; ICAO: WSSS

Summary
- Airport type: Military airbase
- Owner: Government of Singapore
- Operator: Republic of Singapore Air Force; United States Air Force
- Location: Changi, Singapore
- Elevation AMSL: 7 m (23 ft)
- Coordinates: 01°22′34.53″N 103°58′59.46″E
- Interactive map of Changi Air Base

Runways
Direction	Length		Surface
Direction	m	ft	Surface
02L/20R	4,000	13,123	Concrete
02C/20C	4,000	13,123	Concrete

The Changi Air Base (IATA: SIN, ICAO: WSAC) is a military airbase of the Republic of Singapore Air Force (RSAF) located at Changi, in the eastern part of Singapore. It comprises two separate installations, situated to the east and west of Singapore Changi Airport. Since the expansion of the airbase runway, it now co-shares facilities with the civilian airport, an arrangement that will remain in place until a fourth runway is completed on the eastern side of the base, running parallel to Tanah Merah Coast Road. In the meantime, the extended runway is used for both military and civilian aviation operations.

The air base plays a vital operational role within the RSAF, hosting multiple key units such as 121 Squadron, 112 Squadron, 145 Squadron, the Field Defence Squadron, the Air Logistics Squadron and the Airfield Maintenance Squadron. These squadrons are tasked with a range of missions including transport, aerial refuelling, strike capability and base support operations. Its official badge features the motto Together in Excellence.

== History ==
=== RAF Changi ===
RAF Changi badge

External image
- 1966 aerial view of RAF Station Changi

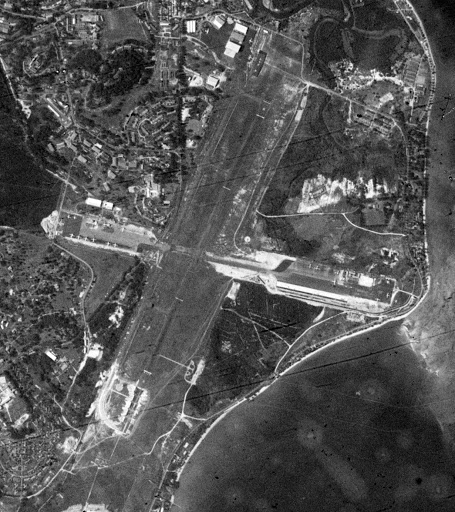
A satellite image of RAF Changi taken during the United States Department of Defense's Corona KH-4 reconnaissance satellite programme on 2 April 1963 (Singapore time)

The area where Changi Air Base now sits was once a large encampment of British Army artillery and combat engineer units based in Singapore between the mid-1930s up until mid-February 1942, when the island fell under Japanese occupation after the British surrender that year. This large encampment, comprising several barracks and military administrative buildings such as Roberts Barrack and Selarang Camp, were used together with the nearby Changi Prison (previously a maximum-security incarceration complex for civilians) for housing many of the Allied prisoners-of-war (POWs) after Japan took over control of Singapore. The construction of the current airfield in Changi Air Base was initiated by the occupying Imperial Japanese Armed Forces using those same Allied POWs imprisoned in the Changi area as forced labourers, building two roughly-paved landing strips between 1943 and 1944, intersecting in a cross-shaped layout and in approximately north–south and east–west directions (similar to what was done at Kallang Airport by Japanese occupation forces) to allow planes to land and takeoff in any possible direction all around. This Japanese-built airfield facility became a Royal Air Force station after the Japanese occupation in Singapore abruptly ended following the Japanese surrender in 1945 and was then renamed as RAF Changi in 1946 by the returning British military authorities. Now, it was the newly imprisoned Japanese troops under British captivity which were then made to improve both runways, reinforcing the north–south runway for military aircraft and adding perforated steel plates on the east–west runway.

Units

- Air Command Far East and Air Headquarters Malaya Communication Squadron RAF
- Air Headquarters Malaya Communication Squadron RAF
- Far East Communication Squadron RAF
- Headquarters Air Command Southeast Asia (Communication) Squadron RAF
- No. 33 Squadron RAF
- No. 48 Squadron RAF
- No. 52 Squadron RAF
- No. 81 Squadron RAF
- No. 84 Squadron RAF
- No. 103 Squadron RAF
- No. 110 Squadron RAF
- No. 205 Squadron RAF
- No. 215 Squadron RAF
- No. 656 Squadron RAF

Completed post-war, non-flying RAF Chia Keng — a GCHQ radio-receiving station, was a satellite station of RAF Changi (being the Headquarters Air component part of British Far East Command) until the withdrawal of British troops from Singapore at the start of the 1970s. Also, the nearby RAF Hospital Changi (now defunct as Changi Hospital and more prominently known as Old Changi Hospital, OCH) functioned as the primary British military hospital which provided medical care for all British, Australian and New Zealand servicemen (collectively, these three Commonwealth states which based troops in Singapore became known by the term "ANZUK", for Australia, New Zealand and the UK) stationed in the eastern and northern parts of Singapore while Alexandra Hospital was directed for those stationed in the southern and western areas of Singapore.

=== Changi Air Base ===
Upon the withdrawal of British forces from Singapore, RAF Changi was renamed as Changi Air Base (CAB) and was handed over to the SADC (predecessor of Republic of Singapore Air Force) on 9 December 1971. Thereafter, the airfield received its first flying squadron of SADC – the Alouette Squadron and their Alouette III helicopters shortly after New Year's Day 1972. With the arrival of the first Shorts Skyvans in 1973, SADC began to form the 121 Squadron at Changi Air Base and it is currently the oldest resident squadron of the airfield.

The novel 'The Sound of Pirates' by former RAF airman Terence Brand is based in the 1960s both on the airfield and in the surrounding areas.

==== Singapore Changi Airport ====
In June 1975, the Singapore government acquired about two-thirds of the airbase (saved for the main flight-line, hangar/aircraft maintenance facilities and control tower which were located in the western section of the airbase) for the construction of the new Singapore Changi Airport, with the new runways in close alignment with the original north–south runway. The east–west runway was almost erased from the map, currently surviving as a taxiway to the apron area which has remained operational as part of Changi Air Base.

== Current base ==
=== Changi Air Base (West) ===
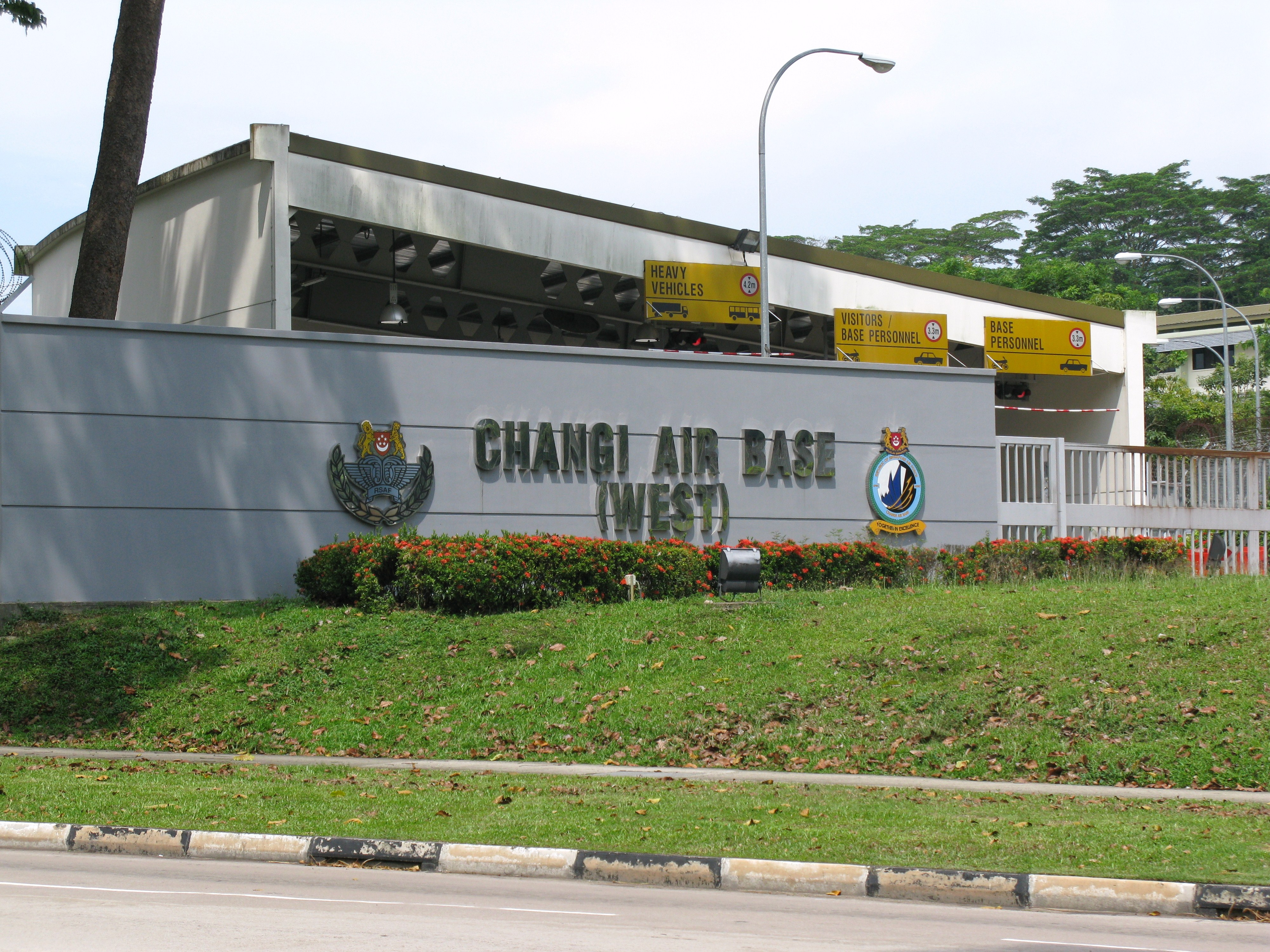
Entrance of Changi Air Base (West)/HQ Changi Air Base.

Following the opening of the new Changi Air Base (East) (Changi East Complex) on 29 November 2004, the existing facilities at Changi Air Base has been renamed as Changi Air Base (West) (Changi West Complex) and Headquarters Changi Air Base (HQ CAB).

==== Flying Squadrons ====
- 121 Squadron "Seek and Destroy"
  - 4 Fokker F50 Utility Transport Aircraft (UTA)
  - 5 Fokker F50 Mark 0502 Maritime Patrol Aircraft (MPA)

==== Support Squadrons ====
- Field Defence Squadron (FDS)
- Airfield Maintenance Squadron (AMS)
- Airfield Operations Maintenance Squadron Fixed Wing 2 (AOMS-FW2)
- Ground Logistics Liaison Office / Ground Logistics Squadron (GLLO/GLS)
- Air Movement Centre (AMC)

=== Changi Air Base (East) ===
Changi Air Base (East) was opened on 29 November 2004.

==== Flying Squadrons ====
- 145 Squadron "Hornet" "Swift & Valiant"
  - 20 F-16D Block 52
- 112 Squadron “Determined To Deliver”
  - 6 Airbus A330 MRTT

Support Squadrons

- 208 Squadron “Reliable And Vigilant Always”
- 508 Squadron "Unrivalled Support"
- 608 Squadron "Vigour And Vigilance"
- 708 Squadron “Agile And Dependable”
- 808 Squadron “Ready And Vigilant”

== Gallery ==
Badge of HQ RAF Far East Air Force (air component of British Far East Command), which was headquartered at RAF Changi.

Men of No 5353 Airfield Construction Wing, Royal Air Force (RAF), assist and supervise Japanese prisoners of war during the construction of the main runway at Changi.

Japanese prisoners of war laying some of the 11,900 rolls of bituminised hessian sheeting that provided a waterproof bedding for the main runway at Changi.

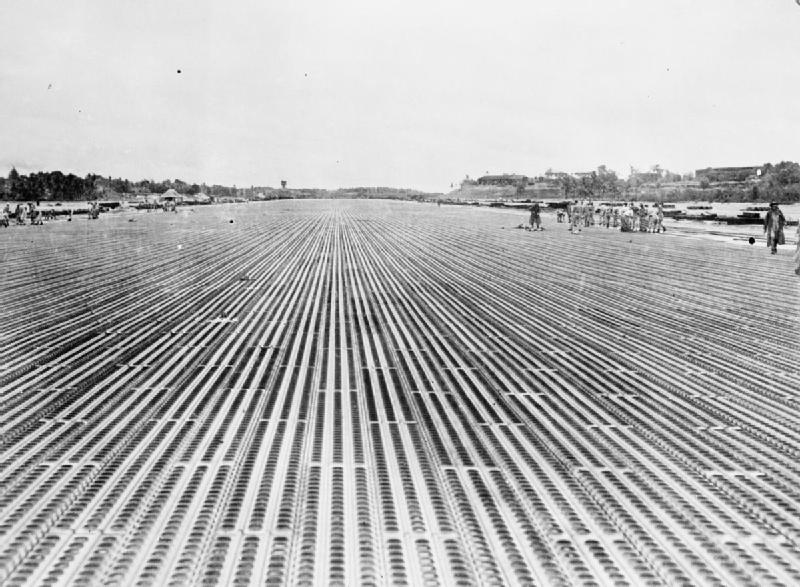
View of the main runway at RAF Changi, Singapore, soon after its completion. The runway constructed from 276,680 pierced steel sheets was 2,000 yards in length and 50 yards wide was able to take the largest aircraft then in service with the RAF.

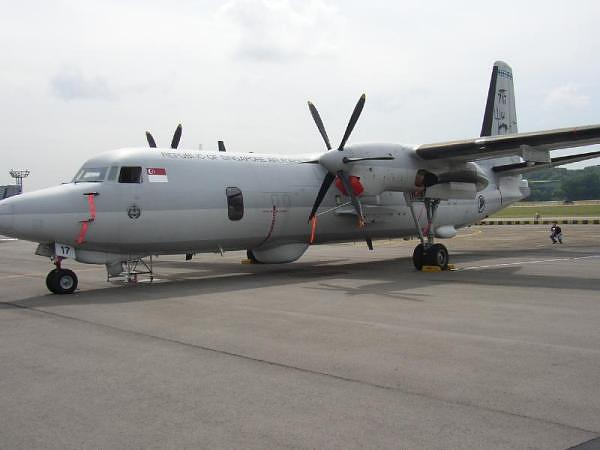
RSAF 121Sqn's Fokker 50 MPA.

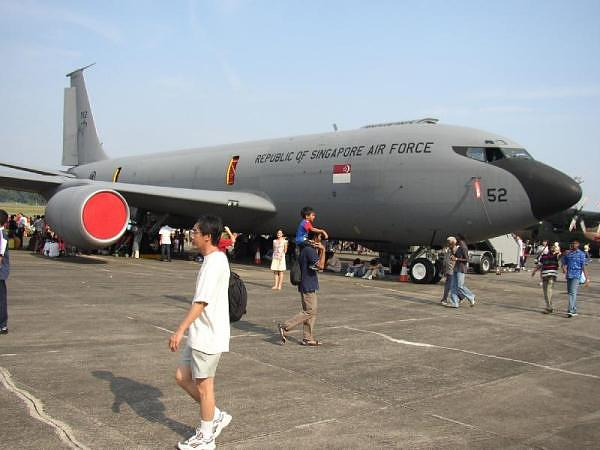
RSAF 112Sqn's KC-135R.

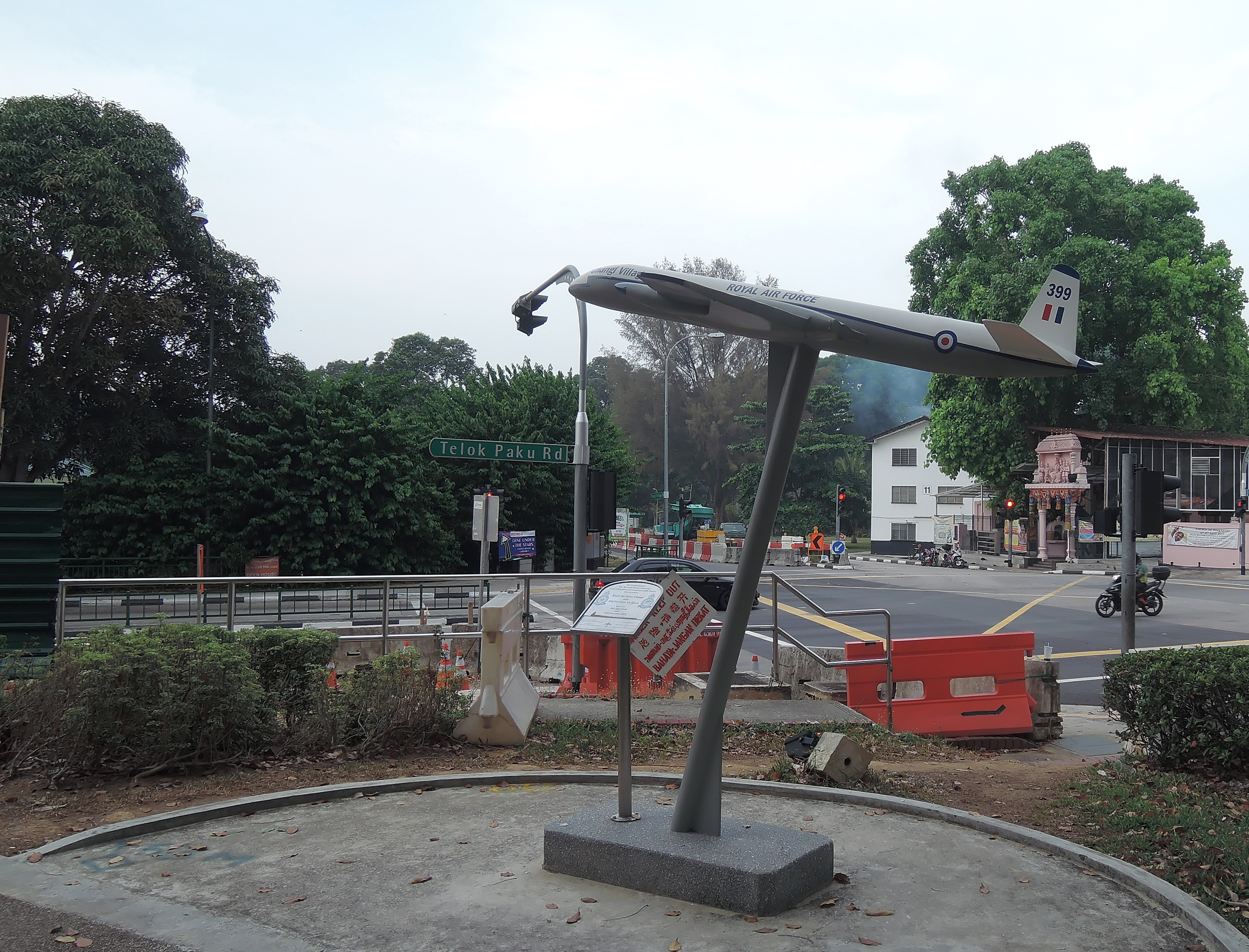
Royal Air Force Changi memorial in Changi Village, built in 2010 to commemorate service of RAF air base and Far East Air Force Headquarters (1946-1971)

== See also ==
- Battle of Singapore
- British Far East Command
- Far East Air Force (Royal Air Force)
- Far East Strategic Reserve
- Former overseas RAF bases
- Indonesia–Malaysia confrontation
- Malayan Emergency
- Republic of Singapore Air Force
