= Teddy Pilley =

- Born: 7 March 1909; Paris, France
- Died: 15 June 1982 (aged 73); London, England

Teddy (Thadée) Pilley was a linguist and conference interpreter.

== Family ==
He was born as Ari Thaddeus Pilichowski in Paris. His parents, Leopold Pilichowski (1860–1934) and Lena Pillico (Pilichowski) (1884–1947), were Jewish émigrés from Poland and were both accomplished artists. Pilley had two sisters, Maia Gainsborough (Pilichowski) (1904–1936) and Thea Doniach (Pilichowski) (1907–1986), and a brother Vivien Pilley (Pilichowski) (1907–1982). When Teddy Pilley was 4‑years old, his parents moved the family from Paris to London, where he remained until his death.

He was married to Nora (Sachs), and they had one son, Peter.

== Education ==
Pilley's early education was at Merchant Taylors' School in London. He then studied at St John's College, Oxford, graduating with a PPE degree.

== Second World War ==
During the Second World War, Pilley served in the RAF, reaching the rank of squadron leader. Pilley was first stationed at RAF Aldergrove in Northern Ireland, where he flew with No.245 Squadron.

He was later transferred to Bletchley Park, where he remained for the duration of the war. At Bletchley, he worked in the Air Intelligence section in Hut 3, translating, classifying and prioritising Luftwaffe signals, which had previously been intercepted and then decoded using Bombe and Enigma machines.

== Conference interpreting ==
During the post-war years, Pilley became a renowned linguist and conference interpreter. He interpreted principally between French (his mother tongue) and English, and vice versa; in addition, he was competent in both German and Dutch, and could also converse in several other European languages.

Pilley was well known as an organiser and recruiter of simultaneous-interpreting teams for major international conferences worldwide, operating as the International Conference Secretariat. In the 1950s, before conference venues had proper facilities for interpreters, Pilley developed portable equipment, consisting of microphones, headphones, wiring and associated electronics; this equipment could be moved from place to place, to provide temporary facilities for simultaneous interpreting during international conferences; Pilley named this equipment Archie, after the famous ventriloquist's dummy.

Pilley was a co-founder of the International Association of Conference Interpreters, and of the Institute of Linguists. He was also the owner and principal of The Linguists’ Club, a language and social club in London. At The Linguists’ Club, Pilley established working parties, an educational tool used to teach aspiring interpreters. Participants were first screened to establish both their language proficiency as well as their aptitude to the work; successful applicants were then trained in the art of professional interpreting.

In his later years, Pilley was recognised as an Officier d’Académie by the French Government, for his services to France.
