= No. 224 Group RAF =

Former Royal Air Force operations group

No. 224 (Mobile) Group RAF ~~No 224 (Tactical) Group RAF~~ ~~No. 224 (Fighter) Group RAF~~
- Royal Air Force Ensign
- Active: 3 January 1942 – 28 March 1942; 1 April 1942 - 1 October 1945; 31 August 1957 – 1 October 1968
- Country: United Kingdom
- Branch: Royal Air Force
- Type: Royal Air Force group
- Part of: RAF Far East Air Force; RAF Third Tactical Air Force

No. 224 Group (224 Gp) of the Royal Air Force was established during the Second World War and was operational during the Cold War.

The group was formed on 3 February 1942 as No 224 (Fighter) Group in Singapore. It was disbanded within two months, as the Japanese seized Singapore, on 28 March 1942. It was reformed three days later on 1 April 1942, and renamed No 224 (Tactical) Group on 1 Dec 1942.

On 1 July 1944 the Group was part of the RAF Third Tactical Air Force alongside No. 221 Group RAF; No. 177 Wing RAF; the 3d Combat Cargo Group USAAF, and the 12th Bombardment Group USAAF. 3 TAF was itself part of Eastern Air Command, Air Command South-East Asia. On 1 December 1944 No. 903 Wing RAF was established at Chittagong Airfield and joined the Group.

224 Group was disbanded by renaming it as Air Headquarters Malaya on 30 September 1945. The Malayan Emergency began in 1948, prompting a significant military buildup.

No. 90 (Composite) Wing RAAF arrived from Australia to supervise two RAAF squadrons in 1950, operating under AHQ Malaya. No. 1 (Bomber) Squadron, flew Avro Lincolns, and No. 38 (Transport) Squadron flew Douglas C-47 Dakotas. It was established in July 1950 and headquartered at Changi, on the east coast of Singapore. No. 1 Squadron operated from RAF Tengah, in Singapore's west. No. 38 Squadron was based at Changi and, from April 1951 to February 1952, at Kuala Lumpur in central Malaya. The Lincolns generally conducted area bombing missions, as well as precision strikes, to harass communist insurgents. The Dakotas were tasked with airlifting cargo, VIPs, troops and casualties, as well as courier flights and supply drops. Following No. 38 Squadron's departure in December 1952, No. 90 Wing was disbanded, leaving No. 1 Squadron to carry on as the sole RAAF unit in the Malayan air campaign until its withdrawal to Australia in July 1958.

Delve 1994 lists the following units as part of AHQ Malaya:

- No. 33 Squadron RAF
- No. 45 Squadron RAF
- No. 47 Squadron RAF
- No. 60 Squadron RAF
- No. 88 Squadron RAF
- No. 110 Squadron RAF
- No. 194 Squadron RAF
- No. 205 Squadron RAF
- No. 209 Squadron RAF
- No. 656 Squadron RAF
- Far East Communication Squadron RAF
- No. 1902 Air Observation Post Flight RAF
- No. 1907 Light Liaison Flight RAF
- No. 1911 Light Liaison Flight RAF
- No. 1914 Air Observation Post Flight RAF
- No. 27 Aircraft Disposal Company

No. 224 Group was then reformed twelve years later on 31 August 1957 from AHQ Malaya. From 1959 it was a combined RAF-Royal Australian Air Force formation.

224 Group units during January 1962 included:

- No. 20 Squadron RAF, RAF Tengah, Hawker Hunter FGA.9
- No. 34 Squadron RAF, RAF Seletar, Blackburn Beverley C.1
- No. 45 Squadron RAF, RAF Tengah, English Electric Canberra B.2
- No. 52 Squadron RAF, RAF Butterworth, Vickers Valetta C.1
- No. 60 Squadron RAF, RAF Tengah, Gloster Javelin FAW.9
- No. 81 Squadron RAF, RAF Tengah, Canberra PR.7
- No. 110 Squadron RAF, RAF Butterworth, Bristol Sycamore HR.14 (plus Whirlwinds later, as attested by Smith)
- No. 209 Squadron RAF, RAF Seletar, Scottish Aviation Pioneer CC.1 & Scottish Aviation Twin Pioneer CC.1 & CC.2

Other squadrons listed by Eric Smith as having been engaged during the Confrontation with Indonesia included 64 (Javelin F9s from Tengah, with a forward location at Labuan/Kuching); 205 (Shackleton MR2s from Changi); 215 (Argosy C1s from Changi); 66 (Belvedere HC1s from Seletar); 103 and 230 deployed from the UK with Whirlwind 10s; No. 28 Squadron RAF at Kai Tak, Hong Kong flying Hawker Hunter GA. 9s on air defence patrols; 48 flying Hastings C1/C2s from Changi; and No. 65 Squadron RAF, operating Bristol Bloodhound Mk. II surface to air missiles from Seletar, with a forward detachment at Kuching.

In 1963 224 Group headquarters was at Seletar. The group's its last commander was an Australian, Air Vice Marshal Brian Eaton RAAF. When Eaton took over, at the end of November 1964, permanent squadrons were "dropping from the [group's] strength" and as the group disbanded, on 1 October 1968, Eaton took over as Chief of Staff at Headquarters Far East Air Force the following year.

After the group disbanded in 1968, with the withdrawal of British military forces based in Singapore (under the UK's East of Suez policy), Singapore bought all the Bloodhound missiles of No. 65 Squadron and established the Singapore Air Defence Command's 170 Squadron.
