= No. 95 Squadron RAF =

Defunct flying squadron of the Royal Air Force

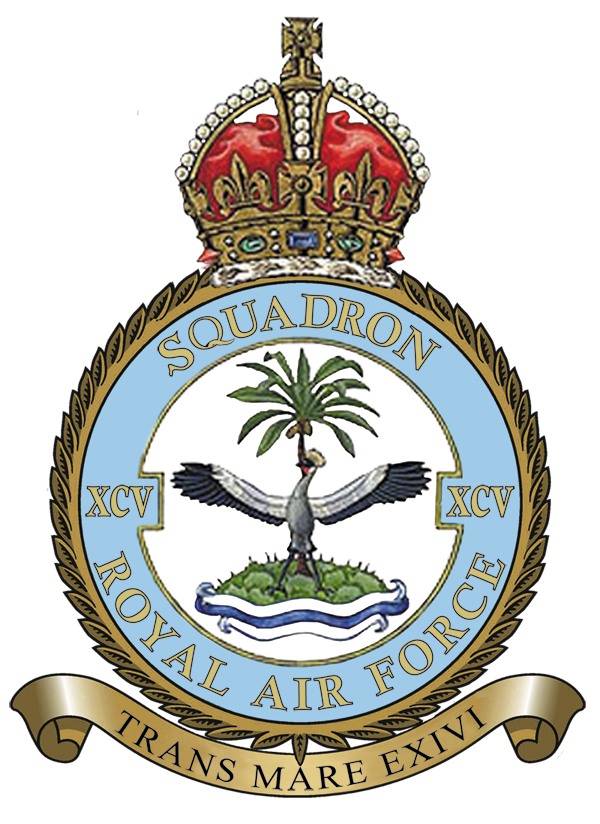
- Official badge of No. 95 Squadron
- Active: 8 Oct 1917 – 4 July 1918; 16 Jan 1941 – 30 June 1945
- Country: United Kingdom
- Branch: Royal Air Force
- Role: Coastal Command
- Motto(s): Latin: Trans mare exivi ("I went out over the sea.")
- Aircraft: Short Sunderland
- Battle honours: •World War II • Africa • Atlantic • Mediterranean

Insignia
- Squadron Badge heraldry: On a mount in waves of the sea in front of a palm tree, a crowned crane displayed.
- Squadron Codes: SE January 1941 – August 1942

No. 95 Squadron was a squadron of the RFC during the First World War, and later re-formed as part of RAF Coastal Command, operating Short Sunderland flying boats during the Second World War.

== History ==
=== First World War ===
The squadron was formed as part of the Royal Flying Corps on 8 October 1917 at Ternhill, Shropshire out of No. 43 Training Squadron using a variety of aircraft. On 30 October 1917 the squadron moved to Shotwick near Chester. The squadron was intended to move to France in April 1918 using the Sopwith Camel, the intended aircraft were later changed to Sopwith Dolphins but with delays it remained at Shotwick in the training role. Other attempts were made to get aircraft and prepare for a move to France but the squadron was disbanded on 4 July 1918 without ever getting its own aircraft.

=== Second World War ===
The squadron was re-formed at RAF Pembroke Dock on 16 January 1941 from part of 210 Squadron, initially with three Short Sunderland flying boats.

- Moved to Freetown, Sierra Leone, on 17 March 1941
- Moved to Gambia in March 1943, with detachments to Sierra Leone, Dakar and Liberia
- Disbanded on 30 June 1945

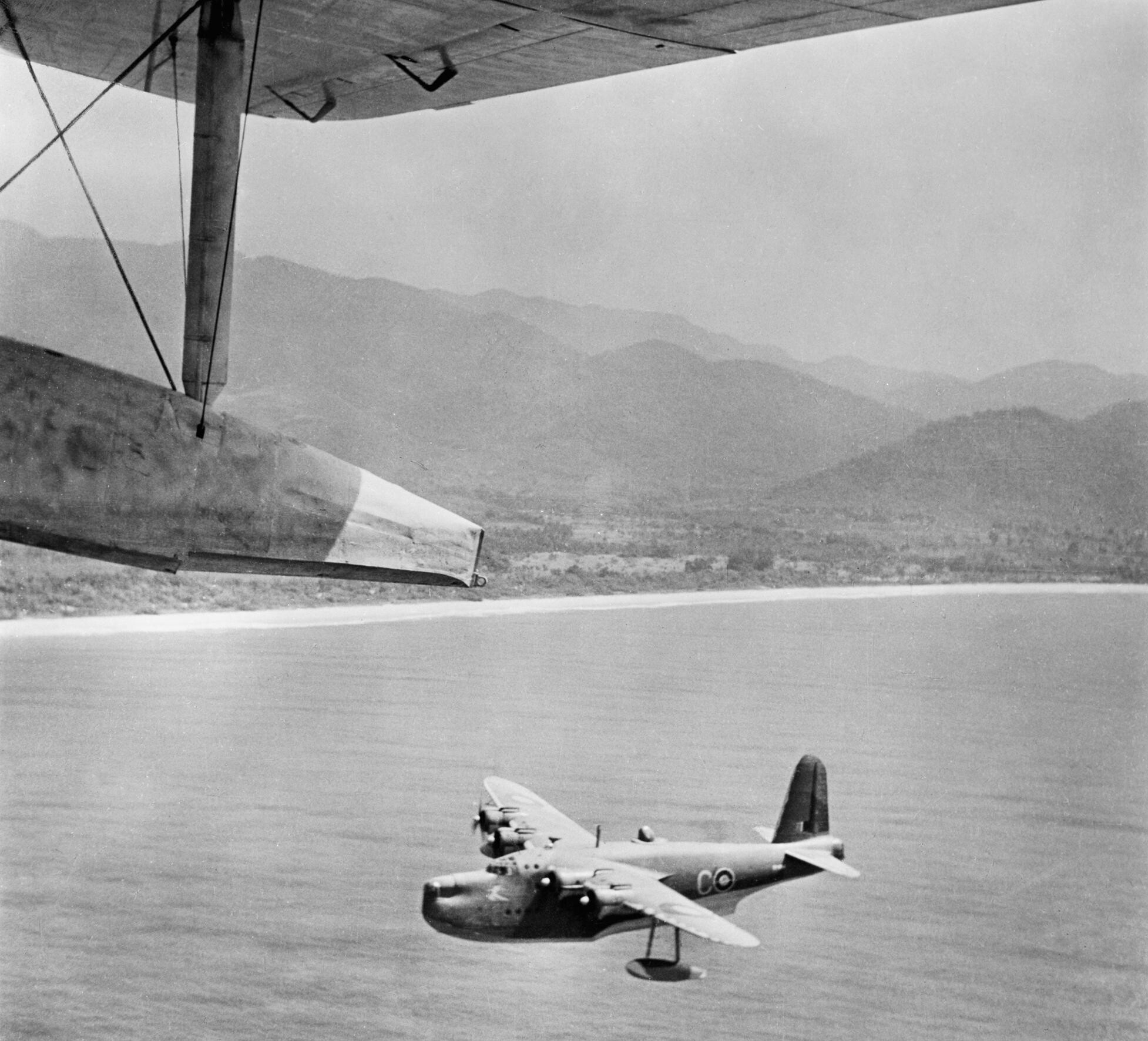
A Short Sunderland flying boat of No. 95 Squadron, patrolling along the coast of West Africa
