= Far East Air Force (Royal Air Force) =

Far East Air Force

- Badge of HQ Far East Air Force.
- Active: 1943–1949; 1949-1971
- Country: United Kingdom
- Branch: Royal Air Force
- Role: Command
- Headquarters: RAF Changi, Singapore

Commanders
- Notable commanders: Arthur Tedder, 1st Baron Tedder

The former Royal Air Force Far East Air Force, more simply known as RAF Far East Air Force, was the Command that controlled all Royal Air Force assets in the east of Asia (Far East). It was originally formed as Air Command, South East Asia in 1943 during the Second World War. In 1946, this was renamed RAF Air Command Far East, and finally Far East Air Force in June 1949.

The command was disbanded on 31 October 1971.

== Early history ==
The RAF's Far East Command was formed in January 1930 and its first officer commanding, Group Captain Henry Cave-Browne-Cave, was double-hatted as Officer Commanding RAF Singapore. This was upgraded to Headquarters Air Force Far East Command in 1933. During the Second World War, when Malaya, Singapore, Burma and Hong Kong were overrun by the Japanese, the command retreated to India, there receiving the name Air Headquarters Bengal.

The true ancestor of the postwar Far East Air Force was formed on 16 November 1943, under Lord (Louis) Mountbatten, Supreme Allied Commander, South East Asia Command (SEAC). It was initially called South East Asia Air Command, but became Air Command, South East Asia (ACSEA) on 30 December 1943. On 1 July 1944 ACSEA comprised No. 222 Group RAF, No. 225 Group, No. 229 Group RAF, and Eastern Air Command, under U.S. Lieutenant General George E. Stratemeyer, itself being made up of the Strategic Air Force (7th Bombardment Group USAAF and No. 231 Group RAF, under Brigadier General Howard C. Davidson of the United States Army Air Force); the U.S. Tenth Air Force (80th Fighter Group, 311th Fighter Group, and 443rd Troop Carrier Group); the RAF Third Tactical Air Force (Nos 221 and 224 Groups, No. 177 Wing RAF, 3d Combat Cargo Group USAAF, and 12th Bombardment Group USAAF); the Photographic Reconnaissance Force (No. 171 Wing RAF and U.S. 8th Photographic Reconnaissance Group); and No. 293 Wing RAF. By January 1945 ACSEA's subsidiary Base Air Forces South East Asia, under Air Marshal Sir Roderick Carr, comprised No. 223 Group RAF on the North West Frontier at RAF Peshawar, No. 225 Group RAF (responsible for the "air defence of southern India and the whole coastline from Bengal to Karachi," by January 1943 controlling Nos 172 and 173 Wings), No. 226 Group RAF, No. 227 Group RAF, and No. 230 Group RAF, carrying out maintenance, training, and administration.

The four major RAF formations under HQ ACSEA in India and Ceylon at the end of the war were HQ BAFSEA; AHQ Burma; HQ 222 Group at Columbo, controlling all operational squadrons in Ceylon, largely carrying out maritime duties; and 229 Group, a Transport Command group located in New Delhi. 222 Group disbanded by being renamed AHQ Ceylon on 15 October 1945; it inherited six Liberator squadrons (Nos 99, 356, 203, 8, 160, and 321 RNLAF); four Sunderland squadrons (205, 209, 230, and 240); and No. 136 Squadron with Spitfires. After HQ BAFSEA was merged with AHQ India, twelve RAF squadrons (225 Group: Nos 5, 30 at Bhopal, 45 at St Thomas Mount; 227 Group: 298 Squadron at Samungli with a detachment at Chaklala; No. 228 Group RAF: 176, 658 AOP, 355 at Digri, 159 at Salbani; 229 Group: 353 and 232 at Palam; and 10 and 76 with Dakotas at Poona) remained in India after 1 April 1946, and AHQ India was placed under joint command of the Indian Government and the Air Ministry (Lee Eastward 65-69, Appendix B, 261).

No. 223 Group was disbanded at Peshawar by being redesignated No 1 (Indian) Group on 15 August 1945; No. 225 Group disbanded at Hindustan near Bangalore by being redesignated No 2 (Indian) Group on 1 May 1946; No. 226 Group disbanded at Palam on 31 July 1946, with its units being transferred to No.2 (Indian) Group; No. 227 Group disbanded at Agra on 1 May 1946 by becoming No. 4 (Indian) Group. In May 1945 No. 228 Group had moved to Barrackpore and absorbed No. 230 Group, and then on 1 May 1946 becoming No. 3 (Indian) Group. No. 229 Group disbanded on 31 March 1947 and its responsibilities were taken over by No. 1 (Indian) Group; and No. 231 Group ceased operations on 1 August 1945, with by that time no units assigned, and disbanded on 30 September.

== Postwar occupation duties ==
Unlike in Europe, war ended very unexpectedly in the Far East. The dropping of the atomic bombs on Hiroshima and Nagasaki, combined with the American blockade of Japan, and the Soviet entry into the war on 9 August 1945 finally shocked the Japanese into suing for peace. Once peace came, there was a period of euphoria within the RAF units, but the forces in the region came back down to earth with a bump a few days later.

Instead of the end to operations that a great many of the conscripts had naively thought would occur, if anything, operations in some parts of the forces increased in tempo. South-East Asia Command had been increased in size from the day after the surrender, taking in south French Indo-China, and much of the Dutch East Indies. The command was now half as big again in area as it had been during the war.

In 1946, ACSEA was renamed RAF Air Command Far East, and finally Far East Air Force in June 1949. The tri-service headquarters remained in place after the war over to coordinate re-occupation of territory within the bounds of the command that had not yet been liberated from the Japanese. That included parts of Burma; the other British colonies of Singapore, Malaya, British North Borneo and Brunei; the independent nation of Siam, the French colony of French Indo-China up to the 16th parallel, and most of the Dutch colony of the Dutch East Indies. After the completion of the re-occupation duties, SEAC was disestablished in November 1946.

However, the benefits of a supreme commander were not forgotten, and a tri-service headquarters was revived in 1962, when the Far East Command was formed. The Far East Command was also disestablished in 1971.

The strain imposed by the high operations tempo that occupation duties, when combined with the downsizing of the command due to demobilisation and return of American aircraft provided under the lend-lease policy, was very great; it manifested itself in a series of strikes around the command in early 1946.

The first of these was at Mauripur in Karachi, India. Enlisted airmen downed tools and refused to work until their grievances about demobilisation had been resolved. Given the nature of the times, this was impossible, although their complaints were passed up the chain of command. The stoppages were non-violent almost to a fault, and since the personnel involved were hostilities-only conscripts, rather than regular professional members of the RAF, the stoppages were not formally treated as mutinies. Had they been so, punishments up to and including execution by firing squad could have been imposed on those responsible. Other strikes occurred in Ceylon, elsewhere in India and Singapore. They also spread to units of the Royal Indian Air Force for a short while.

=== Siam ===
The easiest of the occupation tasks was in Siam. Unlike elsewhere in the region, Siam had retained a functioning civil government throughout the war, and thus British troops did not have to deploy to restore order over most of the country. RAF forces set a headquarters in Bangkok, at Don Muang airfield, under Group Captain D O Finlay on 9 September 1945. The headquarters was from No. 909 Wing RAF. The Wing left its previously controlled aircraft, Republic P-47 Thunderbolts, in Burma. Three squadrons were represented in Siam during the occupation, No. 20 Squadron RAF with Spitfire VIII aircraft, No. 211 Squadron RAF with de Havilland Mosquito VI aircraft, and a detachment of No. 684 Squadron RAF with Mosquito photo-reconnaissance aircraft. The airfield was defended by No. 2945 Squadron of the RAF Regiment. In addition to the resident forces, Douglas Dakota transport aircraft were frequent users of Don Muang. They made supply runs to the airport, stopped over on trips to and from French Indo-China, and evacuated prisoners of war (POWs) and internees who had been imprisoned in Siam at the end of the war. The job in Siam was completed very quickly, with almost all of the RAF personnel at Don Muang being gone by January 1946.

=== Burma ===
Burma was also relatively straightforward to deal with, although more complicated than Siam. Much of the colony had been conquered several months before the war ended, in the major British offensive of summer 1945. That gave ACSEA crucial breathing space to start getting the colony back on its feet before the massive increase in postwar occupation duties occurred. Air Headquarters Burma was established under Air Marshal Sir Hugh Saunders. At the end of the war, it had 28 squadrons under its control. This quickly reduced as the demobilisation took effect. Again, the transport squadrons saw the largest amount of work, evacuating POWs and internees and supplying garrisons and the civilian population. Second to the transport squadrons in workload were the photo reconnaissance aircraft. The opportunity was taken to complete the process of surveying SE Asia from the air, and using the survey to bring maps up to date. The survey was not completed until August 1947. After the immediate postwar clean-up came the task of preparing Burma for independence. AHQ Burma moved out of Rangoon to Mingaladon on 1 January 1947. The headquarters was disbanded on 31 December 1947 and three months later Burma became independent.

=== French Indo-China and Dutch East Indies ===
The most challenging tasks in the entire command were the temporary occupations of the colonies of other European powers. One was the occupation of part of French Indo-China, and the other was the occupation of part of the Dutch East Indies.

The easier of the two was French Indo-China. Resentment against the French was strong, with Ho Chi Minh's Viet Minh movement becoming a significant problem. British forces were responsible for the part of the country south of the 16th parallel, while Chinese forces dealt with the north. An RAF headquarters was set up near Saigon on 8 September at Tan Son Nhut airfield. However, the main occupation forces were slow to arrive. Thus Mountbatten had to use Japanese forces still in the area for internal security duties for a short while. One aspect of the occupation that was smaller in magnitude than in other areas of the command was the number of prisoners of war. Only about 5,000 POWs were in French Indo-China, and thus that part of the repatriation problem was relatively small.

At Tan Son Nhut, a large amount of space was available for transport aircraft; it had hard standings (all-weather concrete supports for landed aircraft) for about 70 Dakotas. This was fortunate since a great number of transport aircraft was required in the country, despite the low population of POWs. The other aircraft at the airfield were Spitfires of No. 273 Squadron RAF and a detachment of photo-reconnaissance Mosquitoes. The situation in French Indo-China and the Dutch East Indies was particularly difficult due to local hostility to the returning colonial powers. French Indo-China was handed back to French control a great deal faster than the Dutch East Indies reverted to Dutch control. This meant that in French Indo-China RAF aircraft were not required to suppress any revolts, apart from on one occasion when Spitfires attacked enemy forces with cannon fire to support French ground troops. The RAF provided some spare Spitfires to French Air Force pilots who were being sent to the colony, and more Spitfires were sent from Europe. The main RAF presence was withdrawn in mid-February 1946, when the Air Headquarters was disbanded. However, a small RAF presence was retained for a few more months to help direct military transport aircraft using the airfield.

== Indonesia-Malaysia confrontation ==
The Indonesian–Malaysian Confrontation during 1962–1966 was Indonesia's political and armed opposition to the creation of Malaysia. It is also known by its Indonesian/Malay name Konfrontasi. Malaysia was created by the amalgamation of the Federation of Malaya (now West Malaysia), Singapore and the crown colony/British protectorates of Sabah and Sarawak (collectively known as British Borneo, now East Malaysia) in September 1963.

The confrontation was an undeclared war with most of the action in the border area between Indonesia and East Malaysia on the island of Borneo (known as Kalimantan in Indonesia). Sabah and Sarawak were ethnically, religiously and politically diverse and there was some local opposition to joining Malaysia that Indonesia attempted to exploit, although with little success.

The terrain in Borneo was challenging and there were very few roads. Both sides relied on light infantry operations and air transport, although rivers were also used. There was almost no use of offensive airpower. The British and Malaysian Armed Forces provided a significant element of the effort with assistance from the other member nations (Australia and New Zealand) from the combined Far East Strategic Reserve stationed then in West Malaysia and Singapore.

Initial Indonesian attacks into East Malaysia relied heavily on local volunteers trained by the Indonesian Army. The main military forces backing Malaysia were British and initially their activities were low key. The British responded to increased Indonesian activity by expanding their own. This included, starting in 1965, covert operations into Indonesian Kalimantan under the code name Operation Claret. In 1965 there were several Indonesian operations into West Malaysia, but without military success. By August 1966, following Indonesian President Suharto's rise to power, a peace agreement finally took effect as Indonesia accepted the existence of Malaysia.

== Drawdown and departure ==
RAF units and forces in Burma, the Dutch East Indies, French Indochina, and Siam/Thailand left in 1945–1947. Forces in India departed in 1947, though many RAF officers and other personnel stayed on for a time with the Royal Pakistan Air Force and the Indian Air Force.

Air Headquarters Malaya (AHQ Malaya) was disbanded on 31 August 1957. No. 222 Group RAF was raised to command status as AHQ Ceylon on 16 Oct 1945. This was in turn disbanded on 1 November 1957. Its stations, including RAF Negombo, 22 miles north Colombo, had been handed over to the Royal Ceylon Air Force in the course of 1955–56.

== Subordinate formations ==
=== Air Command, South East Asia ===
- No. 222 Group RAF - partial listing of squadrons only
  - 17, No. 273 Squadron RAF (Spitfire)
  - No. 8 Squadron RAF (Vickers Wellington under AHQ Aden 1 July 1944 for administration and local operational control)
  - No. 321 Squadron RAF, No. 413 Squadron RCAF (Catalina)
  - No. 230 Squadron RAF (Sunderland)
  - No. 89 Squadron RAF
  - No. 160 Squadron RAF (Liberator)
- No. 231 Group RAF
- No. 175 Wing RAF
  - No. 99 Squadron RAF (Wellington)
  - No. 292 (A.S.R.) Squadron (Warwick)
- No. 184 Wing RAF
  - Nos 353, No. 356 Squadron RAF (Liberator)
- No. 185 Wing RAF
  - No. 159 Squadron RAF (Liberator)
- No. 225 Group RAF
  - No. 5 Squadron RAF (Hurricane)
  - No. 27 Squadron RAF, 47 Squadron, Beaufighter
  - Nos. 200, 354 Squadrons (Liberator)
  - No. 203 Squadron RAF (Wellington)
  - No. 191 Squadron RAF, Nos 212, 240 Squadrons (Catalinas)
- No. 229 Group RAF
- Eastern Air Command
  - Photographic Reconnaissance Force
    - No. 171 Wing RAF
      - No. 681 Squadron RAF (disbanded by being renumbered as 34 Squadron, 1 August 1946)
      - No. 684 Squadron RAF
  - Third Tactical Air Force - partial listing only
    - No. 177 Wing RAF
      - Nos 31, 62, 117, 194 Squadrons (Dakota)
      - 3d Combat Cargo Group (to be activated, Sylhet Airfield, 5 June 1944) (to include four combat cargo squadrons)
    - No. 221 Group RAF
      - No. 168 Wing RAF
        - No. 60 Squadron RAF (Hurricane);
        - No. 81 Squadron RAF (Spitfire);
        - No. 84 Squadron RAF (Vengeance)
      - No. 170 Wing RAF
        - Nos. 1 (I.A.F.), No. 11 Squadron RAF, Nos 42, 113 Squadrons (Hurricane);
        - Nos. 607, 615 Squadrons (Spitfire)
      - No. 243 Wing RAF
        - Nos 28 and 34 Squadrons RAF (Hurricane)
    - No. 224 Group RAF, with Nos 165, 166, and 167 Wings RAF and their squadrons

=== Other AHQs and groups ===
- Air Headquarters Burma between 20 September 1945 and 15 December 1947
- AHQ Ceylon – the AHQ continued after Ceylon became independent, moving from Katurkuruda to RAF Negombo on 23 February 1948 (see Lee, Eastward, 86-87). The AHQ was disbanded 1 November 1957
- AHQ Hong Kong (1946-67) Disbanded into British Forces Hong Kong
- AHQ India formed 16 August 1939 at Simla – disbanded 15 August 1947
  - Detachments from No. 22 Anti-Aircraft Co-operation Unit RAF from July 1944
- AHQ Bengal was initially formed at Calcutta, operational between 20 April 1942 and 23 March 1943. It was reformed on 1 August 1944 at Barrackpore and disbanded on 4 December 1944
  - No. 221 Group RAF
  - No. 223 Group RAF
  - No. 224 Group RAF
  - No. 225 Group RAF
  - No. 226 Group RAF
  - No. 227 Group RAF
- AHQ Malaya – previously No. 224 Group, formed 30 September 1945, disbanded 31 August 1957 to become No. 224 Group
- AHQ Netherlands East Indies formed 1 October 1945 and disbanded 30 November 1946
- AHQ Siam formed at Bangkok and was operational between 1 October 1945 and April 1946, it was previously No. 909 Wing RAF
- AHQ Singapore was operational between 16 February 1953 and 1 January 1958, it was previously No. 230 Group RAF
  - No. 81 Squadron RAF
  - No. 390 Maintenance Unit RAF
- No. 224 Group RAF – disbanded 30 September 1945, reformed 31 August 1957, disbanded 1 October 1968

  - No. 20 Squadron RAF
  - No. 34 Squadron RAF
- No. 45 Squadron RAF
- No. 52 Squadron RAF
- No. 60 Squadron RAF
- No. 81 Squadron RAF
- No. 110 Squadron RAF
- No. 209 Squadron RAF

=== Flying squadrons ===
- No. 8 Squadron RAF (1944-45)
- No. 10 Squadron RAF (1945-47)
- No. 11 Squadron RAF (1928-46)
- No. 17 Squadron RAF (1942-46)
- No. 20 Squadron RAF (1919-47)
- No. 28 Squadron RAF (1920-78)
- No. 30 Squadron RAF (1942-46)
- No. 33 Squadron RAF (1949-55)
- No. 34 Squadron RAF (1939-49 & 1960-67)
- No. 36 Squadron RAF (1930-42)
- No. 39 Squadron RAF (1939)
- No. 45 Squadron RAF (1942-70)
- No. 48 Squadron RAF (1945-71)
- No. 52 Squadron RAF (1944-66)
- No. 60 Squadron RAF (1942-68)
- No. 62 Squadron RAF (1939-47)
- No. 64 Squadron RAF (1965-67)
- No. 65 Squadron RAF (1964-70)
- No. 66 Squadron RAF (1962-69)
- No. 74 Squadron RAF (1967-71)
- No. 80 Squadron RAF (1949-55)
- No. 81 Squadron RAF (1943-70)
- No. 84 Squadron RAF (1942-53)
- No. 88 Squadron RAF (1946-54)
- No. 96 Squadron RAF (1945-46)
- No. 100 Squadron RAF (1943-42)
- No. 103 Squadron RAF (1963-75)
- No. 110 Squadron RAF (1943-71)
- No. 131 Squadron RAF (1945)
- No. 132 Squadron RAF (1945-46)
- No. 136 Squadron RAF (1941-46)
- No. 152 Squadron RAF (1943-47)
- No. 155 Squadron RAF (1942-59)
- No. 205 Squadron RAF (1942-71)
- No. 209 Squadron RAF (1942-68)
- No. 211 Squadron RAF (1943-46)
- No. 215 Squadron RAF (1942-46)
- No. 225 Squadron RAF (1963-65)
- No. 258 Squadron RAF (1942-45)
- No. 267 Squadron RAF (1954-48)
- No. 656 Squadron RAF/AAC (1943 – 15 January 1947; 29 June 1948 – 1 September 1957)

=== Other units ===
- No. 389 Maintenance Unit RAF
- No. 390 Maintenance Unit RAF
- No. 5001 (Airfield Construction) Squadron, RAF Seletar, 1963–66
- Far East Air Force Examining Squadron at Seletar, 1950-51
- Far East Air Force Survival and Parachute Training School at Changi, 1959-71
- Far East Air Force Training Squadron at Seleter, 1951-55
- Far East Casualty Evacuation Flight at Changi, 1950-53
- RAF Far East Communication Flight at Changi, 1947
- RAF Far East Communication Squadron at Changi, 1947-59
- Far East Flying Boat Wing at Seletar, 1950-54
- Far East School of Joint Warfare at Seletar, 1966-68
- Far East Transport Wing at Changi, 1952-56
- Tactical Development Unit, Far East at Ratmalana, 1943-45
- Armament Practice Camp, Butterworth, 1955-56

== Stations ==
Malaysia

- RAF Butterworth, Penang, Malaysia
- RAF Kuala Lumpur, Kuala Lumpur, Malaysia
- RAF Kuantan, Pahang, Malaysia
- RAF Labuan, Labuan, Malaysia

Singapore

- RAF Changi, Tanah Merah, Singapore
- RAF Kallang, Kallang, Singapore
- RAF Seletar, North-East Region, Singapore
- RAF Tengah, West Region, Singapore

Hong Kong

- RAF Kai Tak, Kowloon, Hong Kong
- RAF Sek Kong, New Territories, Hong Kong

Myanmar/Burma

- RAF Hmawbi, Yangon, Myanmar
- RAF Meiktila, Myanmar
- RAF Pegu, Myanmar (159-279-355)
- RAF Mingaladon, Yangon, Myanmar

Other

- RAF Gan (Addu Atoll), Seenu Atoll, Maldives

== Commanders ==
Commanders included:

=== Far East Command ===
? (1933–1938)
Air Vice Marshal John Tremayne Babington (1938–1941) later known as Sir John Tremayne.
Air Vice Marshal C. W. H. Pulford (1941– 1942) died of malaria on active service
Air Vice Marshal Paul Maltby (1942) captured; POW

=== Air Command South East Asia ===
- Air Chief Marshal Sir Richard Peirse (16 November 1943 – 26 November 1944)
- Air Marshal Sir Guy Garrod (26 November 1944 – 25 February 1945) – Temporary appointment
- Air Chief Marshal Sir Keith Park (25 February 1945 – 30 April 1946)
- Air Marshal Sir George Pirie (30 April – 30 September 1946)

=== Air Command Far East ===
- Air Marshal Sir George Pirie (30 September 1946 – 18 November 1947)
- Air Marshal Sir Hugh Lloyd (18 November 1947 – 1 June 1949)

=== Far East Air Force ===
- Air Marshal Sir Hugh Lloyd (1 June – 26 November 1949)
- Air Marshal Sir Francis Fogarty (26 November 1949 – 11 June 1952)
- Air Marshal Sir Clifford Sanderson (11 June 1952 – 12 November 1954)
- Air Marshal Sir Francis Fressanges (12 November 1954 – 13 July 1957)
- Air Marshal The Earl of Bandon (13 July 1957 – 30 June 1960)
- Air Marshal Sir Anthony Selway (30 June 1960 – 31 May 1962)
- Air Marshal Sir Hector McGregor (31 May 1962 – 10 June 1964)
- Air Marshal Sir Peter Wykeham (10 June 1964 – 8 August 1966)
- Air Marshal Sir Rochford Hughes (8 August 1966 – 11 February 1969)
- Air Marshal Sir Neil Wheeler (11 February 1969 – 1 October 1970)
- Air Vice Marshal N M Maynard (1 October 1970 – 31 October 1971)

== See also ==
- List of Royal Air Force commands
