= RAF Kuala Lumpur =

RAF Kuala Lumpur Simpang Airport
- IATA: KUL^{a}; ICAO: WMKK^{a}

Summary
- Airport type: Military
- Operator: Royal Air Force
- Location: Kuala Lumpur, Malaysia
- Time zone: MST (UTC+08:00)
- Elevation AMSL: 111 ft / 34 m
- Coordinates: 03°06′41″N 101°42′10″E

Map
- Location in West Malaysia
- a. Now assigned to KLIA; Sources: AIP Malaysia

Royal Air Force Kuala Lumpur or more simply RAF Kuala Lumpur is a former Royal Air Force (RAF) station in the Federation of Malaya and saw extensive use during the Malayan Emergency.

It was built and opened by the RAF in 1931.

== Military ==
The airfield was home to: No. 52 Squadron operating Vickers Valettas, used for supply dropping to Army troops in the jungle. In 1959-1961 it was the only operational squadron in the RAF.

- No. 155 Squadron operating Westland Whirlwind HC.4 helicopters.
- No. 194 Squadron operating Westland Dragonfly helicopters/re-equipped with Bristol Sycamore HC.14 helicopters.
- No. 110 Squadron above two squadrons merged on 3 June 1959.
- No. 267 Squadron operating Douglas Dakota, Vickers Valetta, Scottish Aviation Single and Twin Pioneers (Dakota and Auster using broadcasting loudspeakers.)
- 848 Naval Air Squadron (Royal Navy Fleet Air Arm) using Whirlwind helicopters.
- No 656 Squadron Army Mobile Servicing Squadron servicing Auster AOP.6, Auster T.7 and Auster AOP.9.
- The Royal New Zealand Air Force 41 Squadron (RNZAF) used Bristol Freighters.

The station was handed over to Royal Malaysian Air Force in 1961. During the height of the Emergency, the single runway had the highest number of aircraft movements in the world.

The station was situated about 3 miles from the town with its own swimming pool and cinema. It is commonly known to the locals as Sungai Besi Air Force Base. The RAF also handled one of the highest volumes of aircraft movements in the world on a single runway in 2018.

== Civilian ==
The airfield was also the site of the first civil airport, Sungai Besi Airport, which had a route to London with British Overseas Airways Corporation (BOAC) using Britannia aircraft. The airport opened in about 1957. Malayan Airways operated Dakota aircraft on domestic flights. The Duke of Gloucester was greeted at the airport by the British High Commissioner in Malaya, Sir Donald Charles MacGillivray, when Malaya was granted independence ("Merdeka").

Sungai Besi Airport was in use as a civilian airport long before 1957, with Malayan Airways Airspeed Consuls and DC3's flying in and out of the airport from the late 1940s. BOAC Argonauts used the airport in the early 1950s, after the Marsden Matting runway and taxiways were replaced by asphalt. A new terminal building was built in 1957 and this may be the source of confusion as to the date the airport was opened. This building was demolished around 2004.

Qantas started Super Constellation services into the airport in 1958 and BOAC Comets replaced the Britannias in 1959.

The civilian airport was later replaced by Sultan Abdul Aziz Shah Airport in 1965.

== See also ==
- Former overseas RAF bases
