= List of Sikorsky H-19 operators =

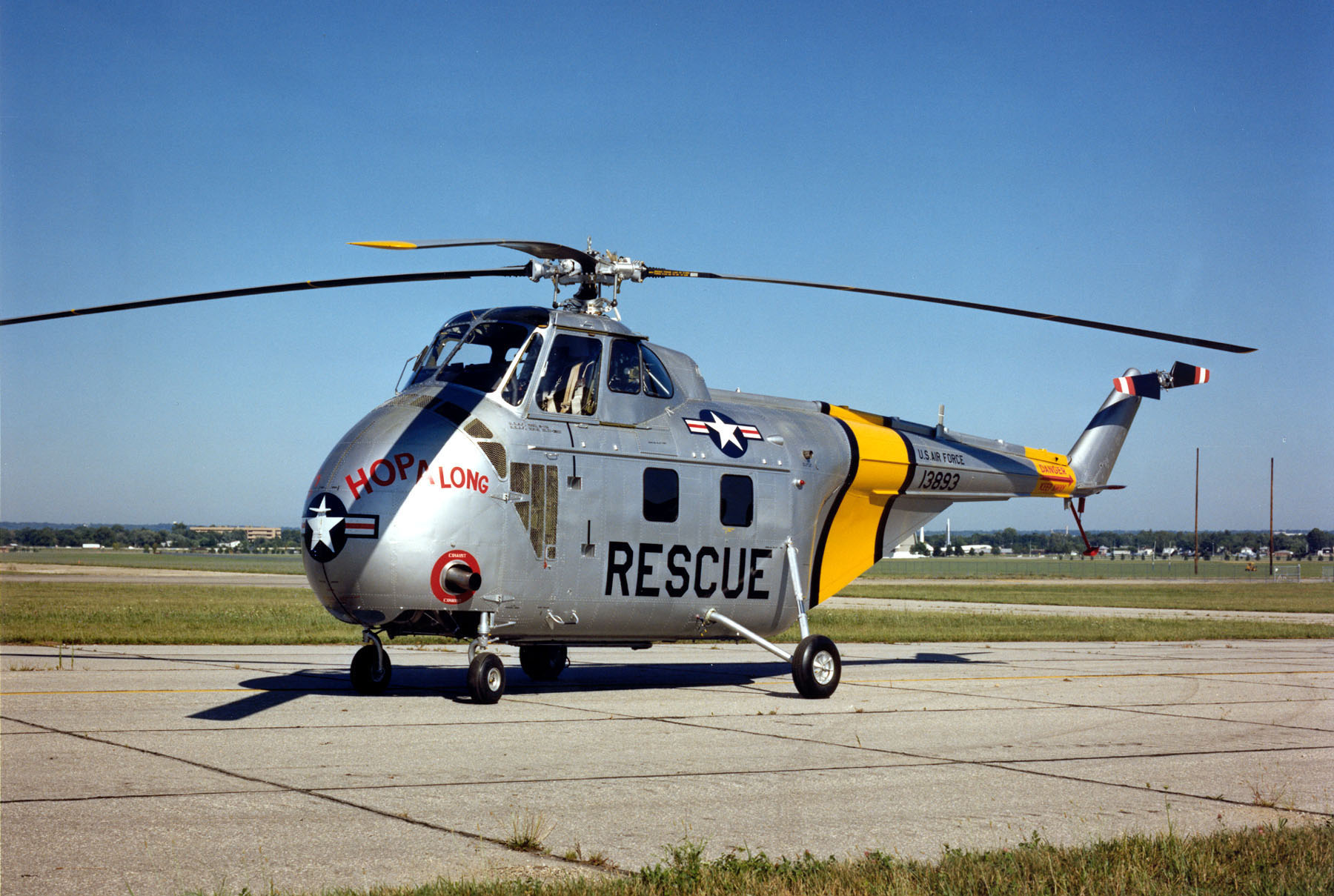
UH-19B, USAF Museum

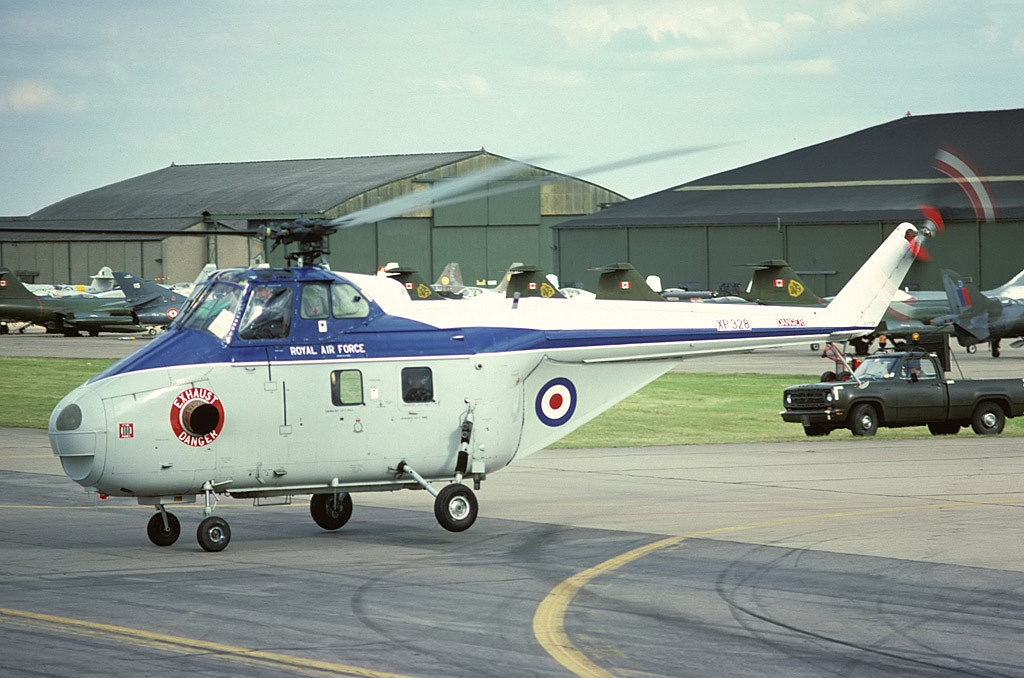
RAF Whirlwind, 1977

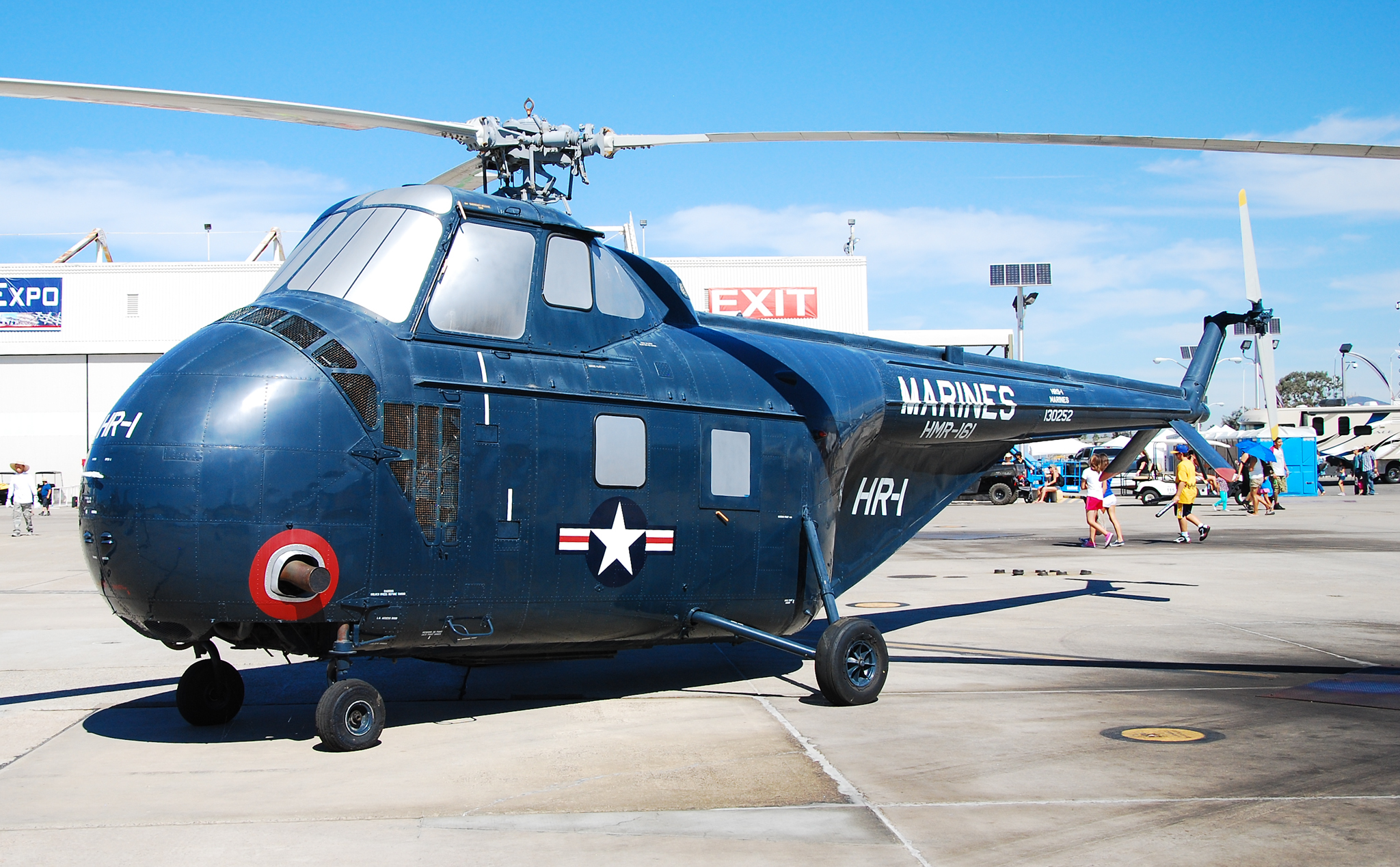
HRS-1 of the USMC on display at a museum in 2014.

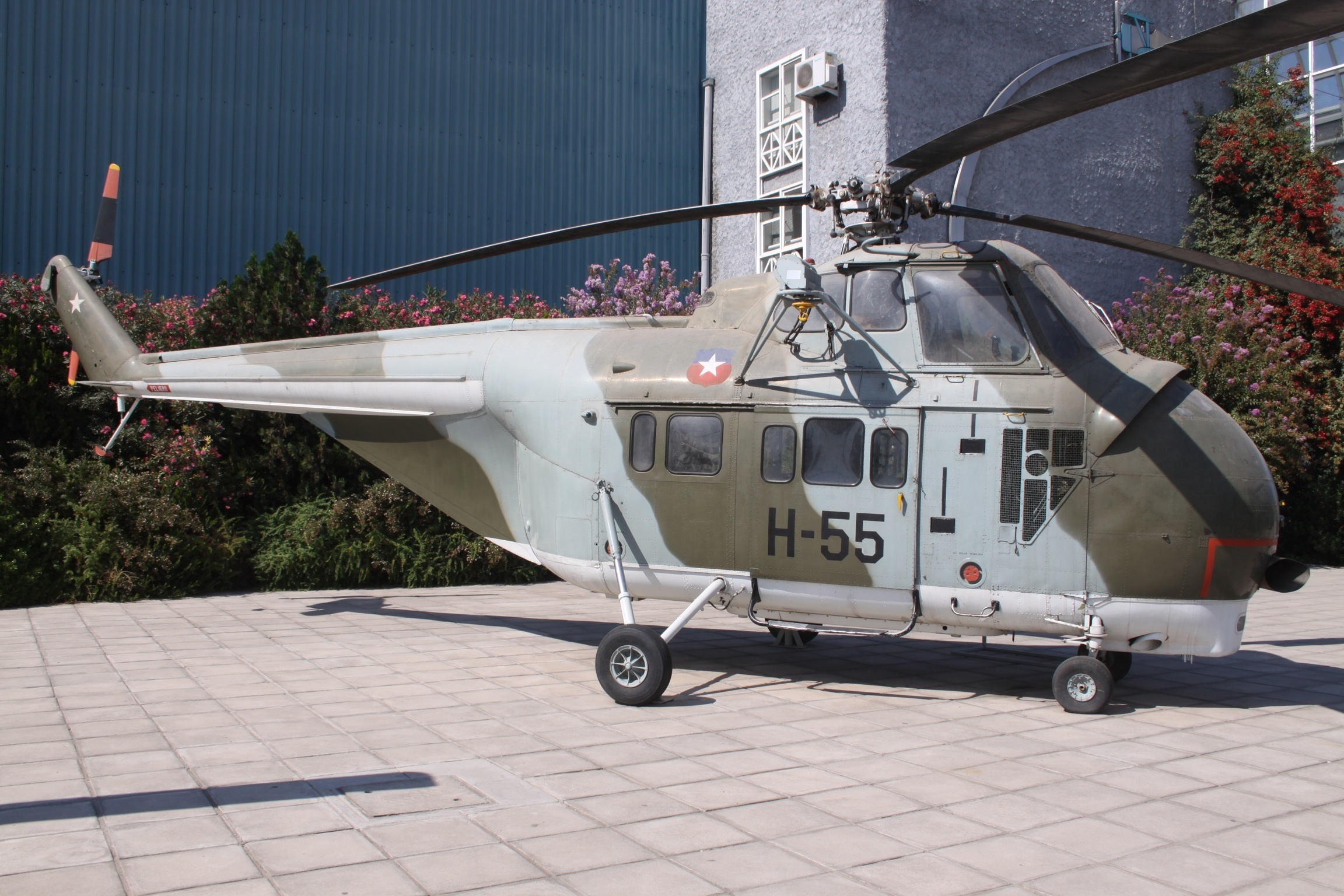
S-55 of the Air Force of Chile on display at a museum.

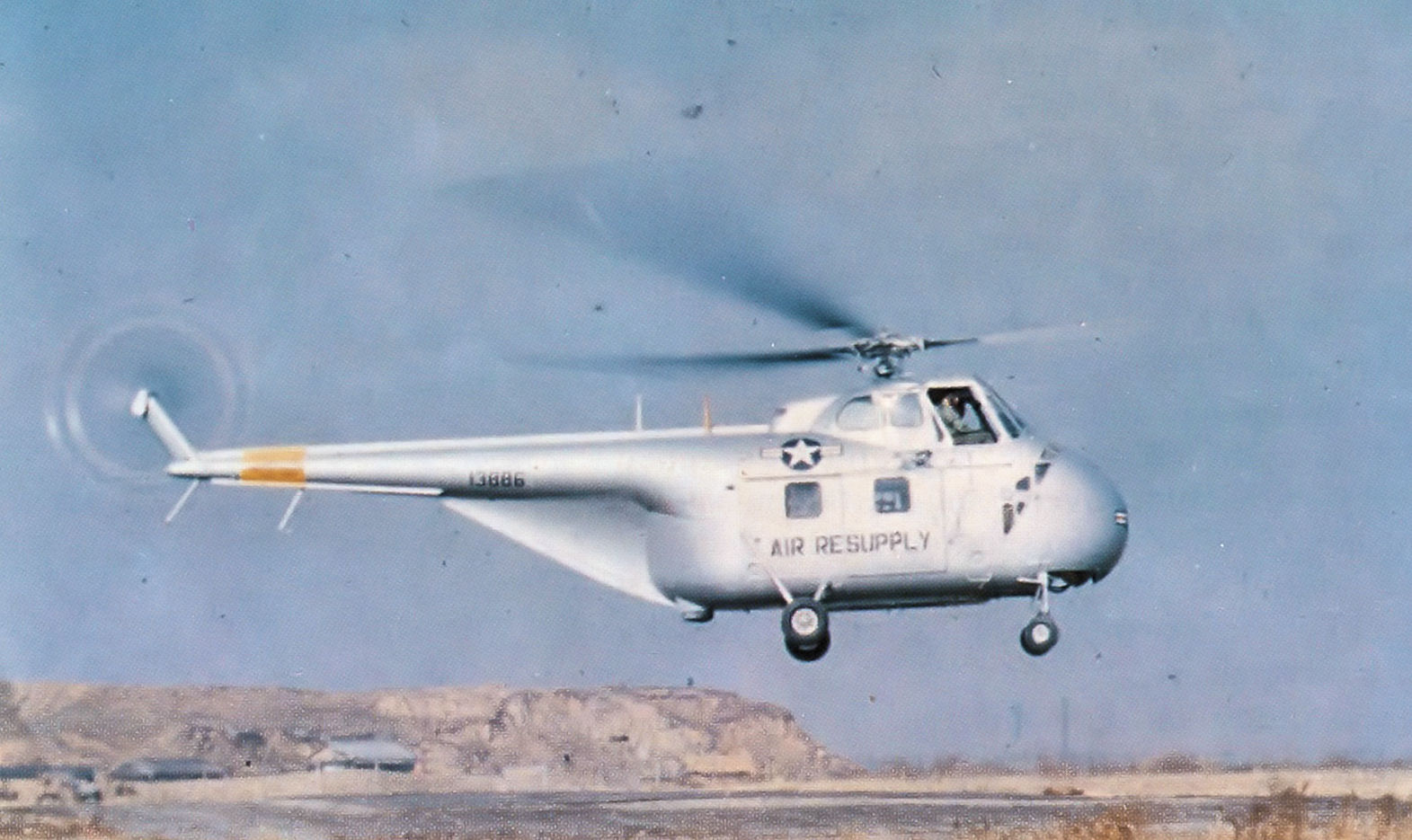
USAF S-55, 1951

The following are operators of the Sikorsky H-19 Chickasaw and Westland Whirlwind helicopters. This helicopter was operated globally with many operators military in the late 20th century.

== Sikorsky H-19 operators ==
=== Military ===
==== Argentina ====
- Argentine Air Force
- Argentine Navy

==== Belgium ====
- Belgian Air Force

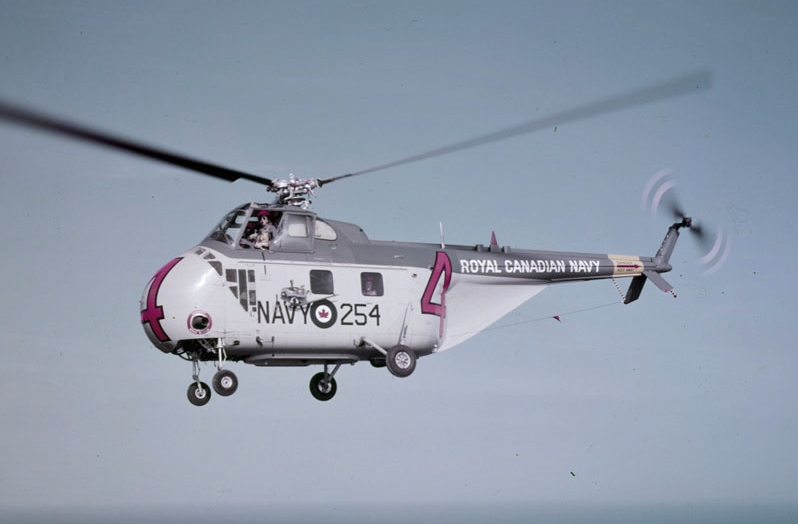
An HO4S of the Royal Canadian Navy

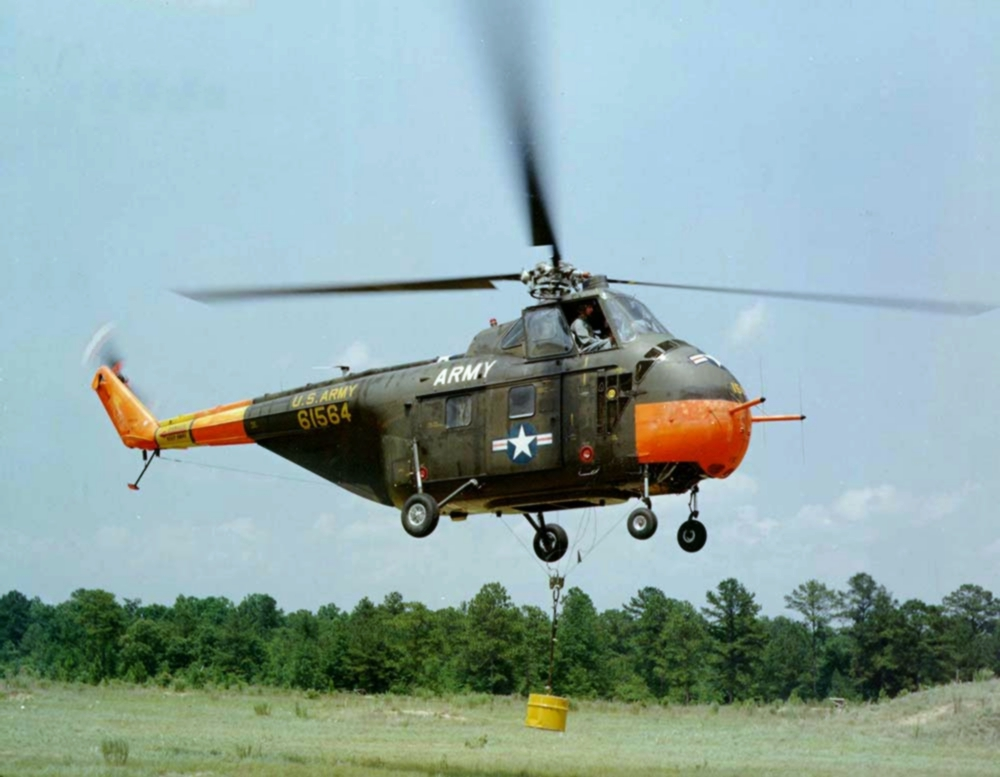
H-19D (S-55) of the U.S. Army

==== Cambodia ====
- Khmer Royal Aviation (AVRK)

==== Canada ====
- Royal Canadian Air Force
- Royal Canadian Navy

==== Democratic Republic of the Congo ====
- Congolaise Government

==== Chile ====
- Chilean Air Force

==== Cuba ====
- Revolutionary Armed Forces

==== Dominican Republic ====
- Dominican Air Force

==== Denmark ====
- Danish Air Force

==== France ====
- French Air Force

==== Greece ====
- Hellenic Air Force

==== Guatemala ====
- Guatemalan Air Force

==== Haiti ====
- Haitian Air Force

==== Honduras ====
- Honduran Air Force

==== Israel ====
- Israeli Air Force

==== Italy ====
- Italian Air Force

==== Japan ====
- Japan Air Self-Defense Force
- Japan Ground Self-Defense Force
- Japan Maritime Self-Defense Force

==== Katanga ====
- Katangese Air Force

==== Kingdom of Laos ====
- Royal Lao Air Force

==== Netherlands ====
- Royal Netherlands Navy

==== Norway ====
- Norwegian Navy

==== Pakistan ====
- Pakistan Air Force
- Pakistan Army

==== Philippines ====
- Philippines Air Force

==== Portugal ====
- Portuguese Air Force

==== South Vietnam ====
- Republic of Vietnam Air Force

==== Spain ====
- Spanish Air Force

==== Republic of China ====
- Republic of China Air Force
  - Air Rescue Group

==== Thailand ====
- Royal Thai Air Force

==== Turkey ====
- Turkish Air Force

==== United States ====
- United States Army
- United States Air Force
- United States Marine Corps
- United States Navy
- United States Coast Guard

==== Venezuela ====
- Venezuelan Air Force

=== Historical ===
==== India ====
- Indian Air Force

=== Civil ===
==== Belgium ====
- Sabena

==== United States ====
- New York Airways
- Los Angeles Airways

== Westland Whirlwind operators ==
=== Military ===
==== Austria ====
- Austrian Air Force

==== Brazil ====
- Brazilian Air Force
- Brazilian Navy

==== Brunei ====
- Brunei Air Force

==== France ====
- French Navy

==== Ghana ====
- Ghana Air Force

==== Iran ====
- Imperial Iranian Air Force

==== Italy ====
- Italian Air Force

==== Kuwait ====
- Kuwait Air Force

==== Nigeria ====
- Nigerian Air Force

==== Qatar ====
- Qatar Air Force

==== United Kingdom ====
- Royal Air Force
  - No. 22 Squadron RAF
  - No. 28 Squadron RAF
  - No. 32 Squadron RAF
  - No. 84 Squadron RAF
  - No. 103 Squadron RAF
  - No. 110 Squadron RAF
  - No. 137 Squadron RAF
  - No. 202 Squadron RAF
  - No. 225 Squadron RAF
  - No. 228 Squadron RAF
  - No. 230 Squadron RAF
  - No. 263 Squadron RAF
  - No. 275 Squadron RAF
- Royal Navy
  - 700 Naval Air Squadron
  - 700H Naval Air Squadron
  - 701 Naval Air Squadron
  - 705 Naval Air Squadron
  - 706 Naval Air Squadron
  - 719 Naval Air Squadron
  - 728 Naval Air Squadron
  - 737 Naval Air Squadron
  - 771 Naval Air Squadron
  - 781 Naval Air Squadron
  - 814 Naval Air Squadron
  - 815 Naval Air Squadron
  - 819 Naval Air Squadron
  - 820 Naval Air Squadron
  - 824 Naval Air Squadron
  - 825 Naval Air Squadron
  - 829 Naval Air Squadron
  - 845 Naval Air Squadron
  - 846 Naval Air Squadron
  - 847 Naval Air Squadron
  - 848 Naval Air Squadron

==== Yugoslavia ====
- SFR Yugoslav Air Force
  - 783rd Helicopter Squadron

=== Civil ===
==== United Kingdom ====
- Bristow Helicopters
- British European Airways

== See also ==
- Sikorsky H-19 Chickasaw
- Westland Whirlwind
