= No. 194 Squadron RAF =

Defunct flying squadron of the Royal Air Force

- Active: 9 Aug 1917 – 21 Jul 1918; 14 Oct 1942 – 15 Feb 1946; 1 Feb 1953 – 3 Jun 1959
- Country: United Kingdom
- Branch: Royal Air Force
- Role: Transport
- Part of: No. 20th (Training) Wing, RAF Middle East Area (1917–1918); No. 221 Group RAF (India) (1942–1943); No. 229 Group RAF, Eastern Air Command, South East Asia Command (1943–1946); RAF AHQ Malaya, Far East Air Force (1953–1957)
- Nickname: "The Friendly Firm"
- Mottos: Latin: Surrigere colligere Translation: "To arise and pick up"

Insignia
- Squadron Badge heraldry: A Malayan kris with a dragonfly superimposed
- Unofficial Squadron Badge: A Flying Elephant

194 Squadron RAF, though formed as a training unit in Egypt and ended as a casualty evacuation unit in Malaya, was for most of its active service life an RAF transport squadron that flew in South East Asia.

== History ==
=== Formation and World War I ===
Formed as a training squadron in No. 20 Group (or No. 32 Group) at RAF El Amiriya in Egypt on 9 August 1917, it disbanded on 21 July 1918 into No. 16 Training Depot Station.

=== World War II ===
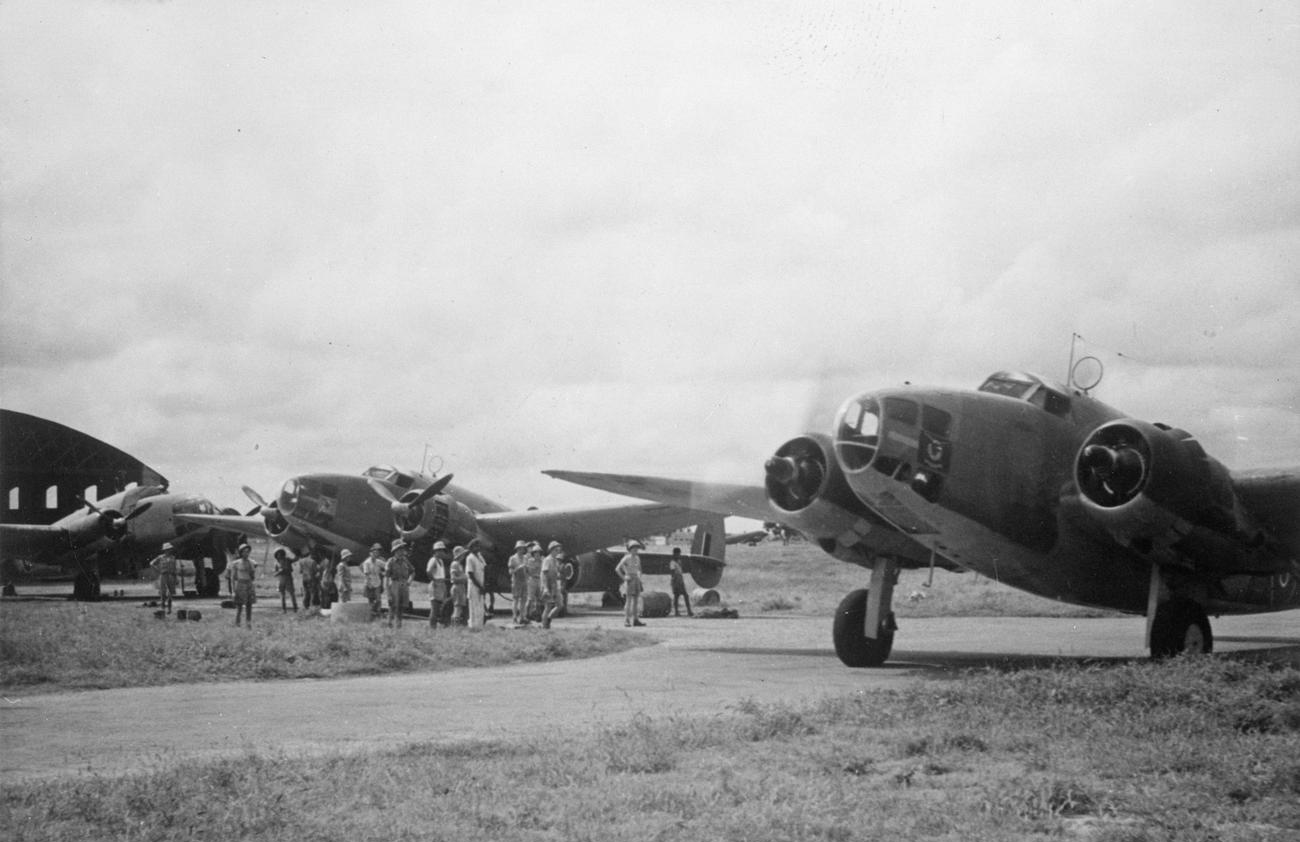
Squadron Lockheed Hudson

No. 194 Squadron was reformed at RAF Lahore, Punjab on 13 October 1942 as a transport unit equipped with Hudsons. It maintained mail and passenger routes in India until it became an airborne forces squadron in September 1943. Douglas Dakotas had started to arrive in May and, with the departure of the last Hudsons in September, No. 194 began paratroop training. In February 1944, supply-dropping flights to Chindit army units in Burma began and continued for the rest of the war. In January 1945 a casualty evacuation flight was attached to the squadron and Stinson Sentinels were used to pick up casualties form small jungle strips. After the end of the war, the squadron was engaged in general transport duties until disbanding at Mingladon on 15 February 1946. The squadron badge commonly used by the squadron depicted a flying elephant and the Squadron had adopted the motto ‘The Friendly Firm’ although their entire fleet of aircraft carried this crest throughout the Burma campaign, the Royal Charter never officially recognized it (That same crest can be seen on all three books about the squadron).

=== Post-war ===
On 1 February 1953, No. 194 reformed for a second time at Sembawang in Malaya from the Casualty Evacuation Flight with Westland Dragonfly HC.2 helicopters for co-operation with security forces in Malaya. Bristol Sycamore HC.14s were received in October 1954, but it was June 1956 before the last Dragonfly left. On 3 June 1959, the squadron merged with No. 155 Squadron RAF to become No. 110 Squadron RAF.

== Aircraft operated ==
Aircraft operated by no. 194 Squadron RAF from
From	To	Aircraft	Version
August 1917	July 1918	Airco DH.6, Avro 504 and Royal Aircraft Factory B.E.2	
October 1942	September 1943	Lockheed Hudson	Mk.VI
May 1943	February 1946	Douglas Dakota	Mks.I, III
Dec 1944	February 1946	Douglas Dakota	Mk.IV
January 1945	September 1945	Stinson Sentinel	Mk.I
February 1953	June 1956	Westland Dragonfly	HC.2
October 1954	June 1959	Bristol Sycamore	HC.14

== Squadron bases ==
Bases and airfields used by no. 194 Squadron RAF, data from
From	To	Base	Remark
9 August 1917	21 July 1918	RAF El Amiriya, Egypt	
13 October 1942	18 February 1943	RAF Lahore, Punjab	Dets. at RAF Tezpur, Assam and RAF Dum Dum, West Bengal
18 February 1943	18 September 1943	RAF Palam, Delhi	
18 September 1943	8 February 1944	RAF Basal, Punjab	Det. at RAF Chaklala, Rawalpindi, Punjab
8 February 1944	9 February 1944	RAF Comilla, Bengal	
9 February 1944	1 September 1944	RAF Agartala, Tripura	Det. at RAF Imphal, Manipur
1 September 1944	2 November 1944	RAF Imphal, Manipur	
2 November 1944	10 December 1944	RAF Basal, Punjab	
10 December 1944	19 March 1945	RAF Agartala, Tripura	Det. at RAF Imphal, Manipur and from January 1945 to September 1945 at RAF Kangla, Manipur and Monywa, Sagaing Division, Burma
19 March 1945	21 August 1945	Akyab, Arakan, Burma	Dets. at Monywa, Sagaing Division, Burma; Wangjing, Manipur and RAF Meiktila, Mandalay, Burma
21 August 1945	15 February 1946	RAF Mingaladon, Burma	
2 February 1953	1 May 1953	RAF Sembawang, Singapore	Det. at RAF Kuala Lumpur, Malaya
1 May 1953	3 June 1959	RAF Kuala Lumpur, Malaya	Merged here with 155 Sqn to form 110 Sqn

== Commanding officers ==
Officers commanding no. 194 Squadron RAF, data from
From	To	Name
October 1942	June 1944	W/Cdr. A.C. Pearson
June 1944	December 1944	W/Cdr. R.T. Chisholm
December 1944	June 1945	W/Cdr. R.C. Crawford
June 1945	August 1945	S/Ldr. P.M. Bristow
August 1945	February 1946	W/Cdr. D. Penman, DSO, DFC
February 1953	1955	S/Ldr. G.R.G. Henderson, AFC
1955	1957	S/Ldr. C.R. Turner, AFC
1957	June 1959	S/Ldr. F. Barnes
