= Muridke Aerodrome =

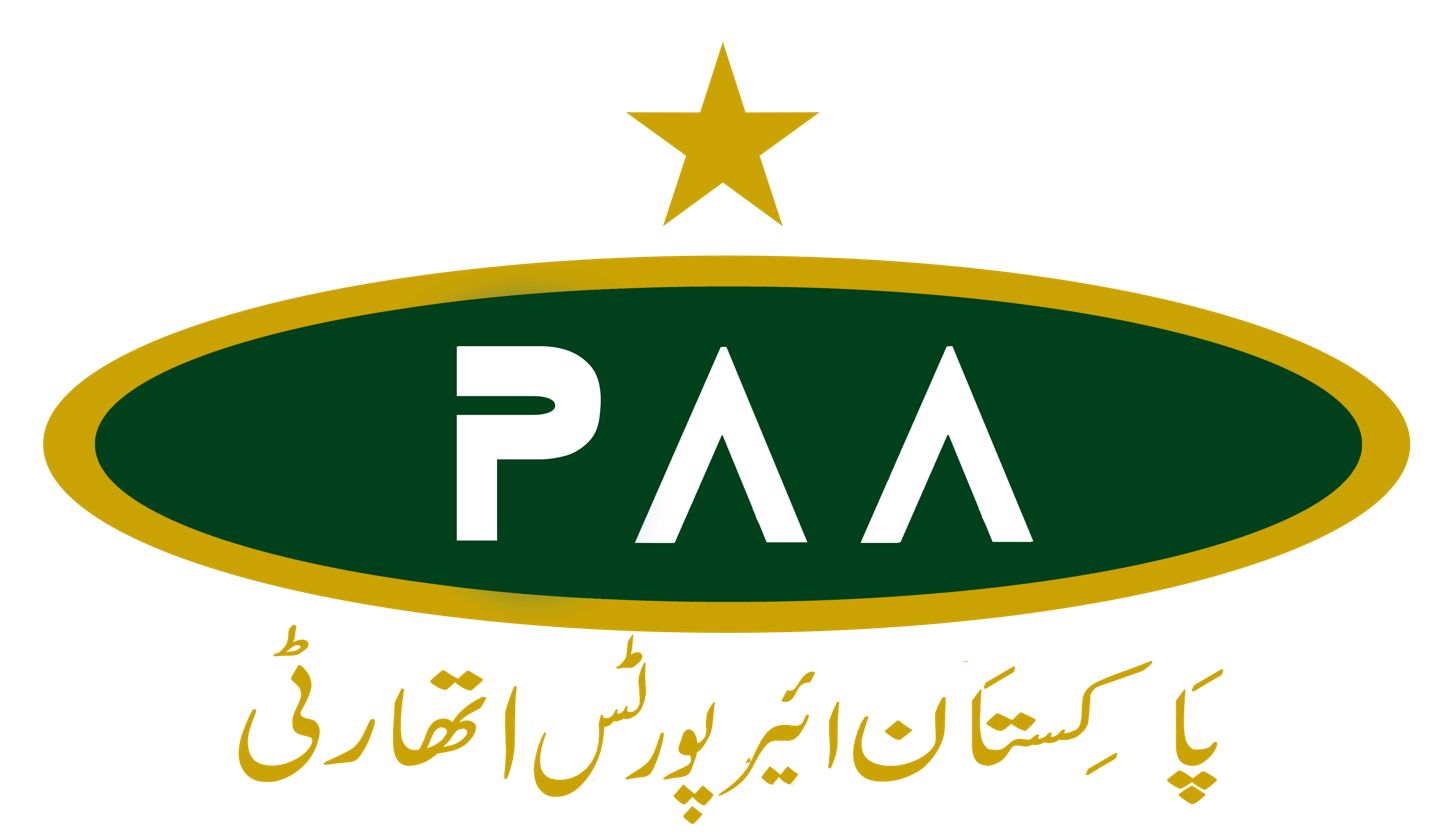
Muridke Aerodrome
- IATA: none; ICAO: OPMU

Summary
- Airport type: Public
- Owner/Operator: Pakistan Airports Authority
- Serves: Lahore, Pakistan
- Location: Muridke, Pakistan
- Opened: 2025
- Time zone: PKT (+5)
- Coordinates: 31°52′40.3″N 74°23′39.4″E
- Interactive map of Muridke Aerodrome

Muridke Aerodrome (ICAO: OPMU) is a general aviation airport in Muridke, Pakistan. The airport replaced the now-decommissioned Walton Airport which was in Lahore.

== History ==
In December 2025, a Cessna 172 registered as AP-BBP landed at the airport during a test flight that officially marked the first time an aircraft landed at Muridke Aerodrome.

== See also ==
- Pakistan Airports Authority
- List of airports in Pakistan
- Walton Airport
