= No. 110 Squadron RAF =

Defunct flying squadron of the Royal Air Force

No. 110 (Hyderabad) Squadron RAF
- Squadron badge of No. 110 Squadron
- Active: 1 Nov 1917 – 27 Aug 1919; 18 May 1937 – 7 Apr 1946; 1 Jun 1946 – 31 Dec 1957; 3 June 1959 – 15 Feb 1971
- Country: United Kingdom
- Branch: Royal Air Force
- Nickname: Hyderabad; Ipswich's Own Squadron
- Mottos: Latin: Nec timeo nec sperno ("I neither fear nor despise")
- Battle honours: Independent Force & Germany, 1918*; Channel & North Sea, 1939–42*; Norway, 1940*; France & Low Countries, 1940*; Dunkirk; Invasion Ports, 1940; Ruhr, 1940–41; German Ports, 1940–41; Fortress Europe, 1940–42*; Malta, 1941*; Mediterranean, 1941; Arakan, 1943–44*; Burma, 1945*; Manipur, 1944; The honours marked with an asterisk* are those emblazoned on the squadron standard

Insignia
- Squadron Badge heraldry: Issuant from an astral crown a demi-tiger The demi-tiger was the crest of the Nizam of Hyderabad who presented the squadron with its original DH.9A aircraft in 1918
- Squadron Codes: AY (Oct 1938 – Sep 1939); VE (Sep 1939 – Mar 1942)

No. 110 Squadron RAF was a unit of the British Royal Air Force, initially formed as a bomber squadron during the First World War. Re-formed during the Second World War, again as a bomber squadron, it was re-formed twice more post-war, firstly as a transport, and then a helicopter squadron, before being disbanded in 1971.

== History ==
=== Formation and the First World War ===
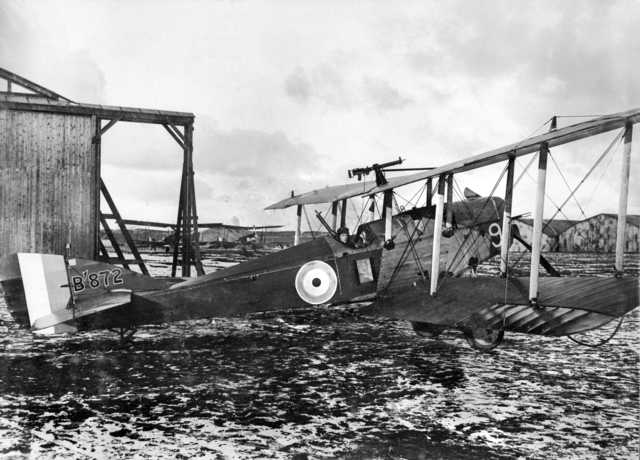
A Martinsyde Elephant G.100, one of the initial types of aircraft the squadron flew with

No. 110 Squadron RFC was formed on 1 November 1917, at Rendcomb, Gloucestershire, and was equipped with B.E.2c aircraft. The squadron moved to Kenley the following year and re-equipped with the DH.9A – the first squadron to operate this aircraft. Its original complement of DH.9As were the gift of His Exalted Highness, the Nizam of Hyderabad. Each aircraft bore an inscription to that effect, and the unit became known as the 'Hyderabad' Squadron in the newly formed Royal Air Force. The squadron arrived in France in September 1918 and formed part of the Independent Air Force, engaged in the bombing offensive against Germany, and later disbanded on 27 August 1919.

=== Reformation and the Second World War ===
The squadron reformed on 18 May 1937 at Waddington, equipped first with Hawker Hinds and then Bristol Blenheims. In 1937 No. 88 Squadron was reformed with personnel drawn from 110 Squadron. In 1939, 110 Squadron was posted to Wattisham along with No. 107 Squadron. On 4 September 1939 Nos. 110 and 107 Squadron led the first RAF raid of the war against Wilhelmshaven. The squadron was mainly involved in anti-shipping strikes during the early part of the war, before being posted to India in March 1942. Later that year the squadron converted to the Vultee Vengeance which it operated until November 1944 when it re-equipped with the de Havilland Mosquito. The squadron disbanded at Labuan on 15 April 1946.

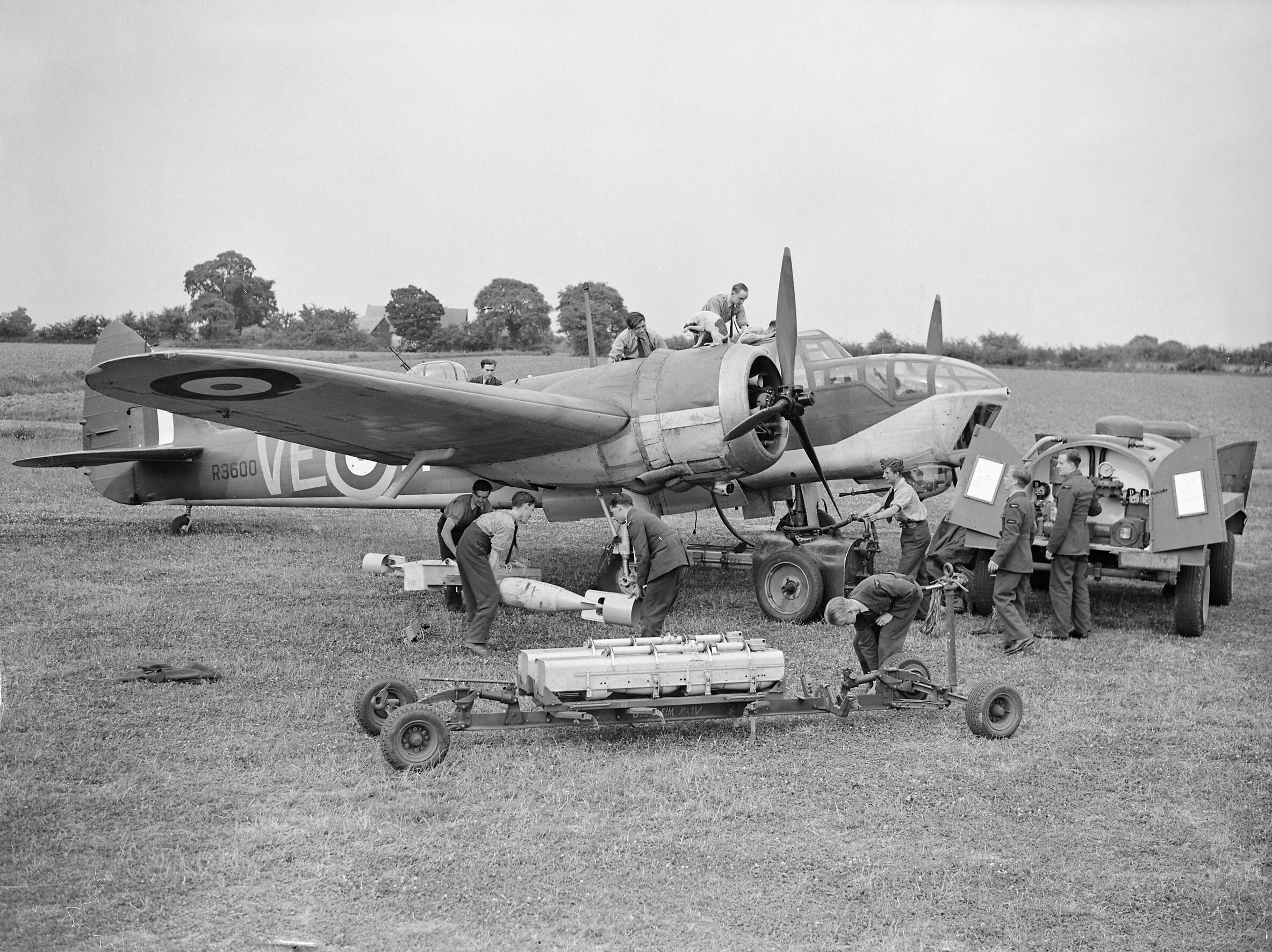
A Bristol Blenheim light bomber of No. 110 Squadron at RAF Wattisham, prior to 1942

=== Post War on Dakotas and Valettas ===
The squadron reformed again on 1 June 1946 at RAF Kai Tak via the renumbering of No. 96 Squadron, and was equipped with Douglas Dakotas. In 1948, the squadron took part in Operation Firedog during the Malayan emergency. In October 1951, the squadron converted to the Vickers Valetta which it operated until disbanding on 31 December 1957.

=== On helicopters ===
On 3 June 1959, 110 Squadron was reformed at Kuala Lumpur from the merger of No. 155 Squadron and No. 194 Squadron, initially equipped with the Westland Whirlwind HC.4. These were in April 1960 supplemented by the Bristol Sycamore HR.14 with the Whirlwinds being replaced by the much more capable Gnome-engined Whirlwind HAR.10s in July 1963, the Sycamores being finally retired in October 1964. From 1963 the squadron also operated in Brunei and Borneo until November 1967 during the Indonesian Crisis. It then continued its normal duties in Malaya, until the Far East Air Force was run-down. The squadron disbanded on 15 February 1971.

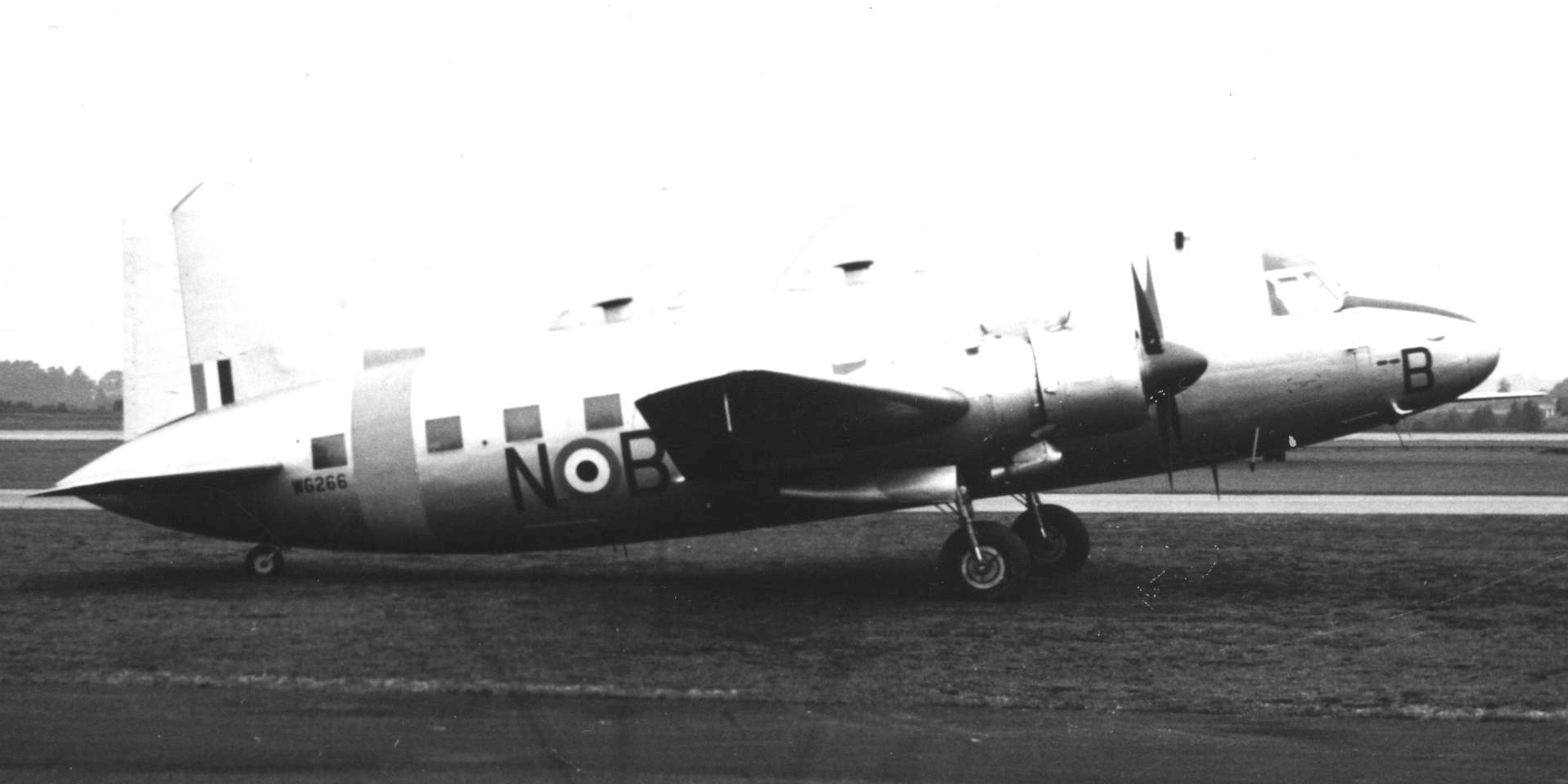
A Vickers 664 Valetta, T.3 'N-B' of RAF College Cranwell at Blackbushe Airport

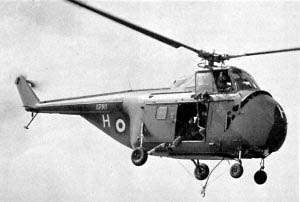
A Westland Whirlwind helicopter

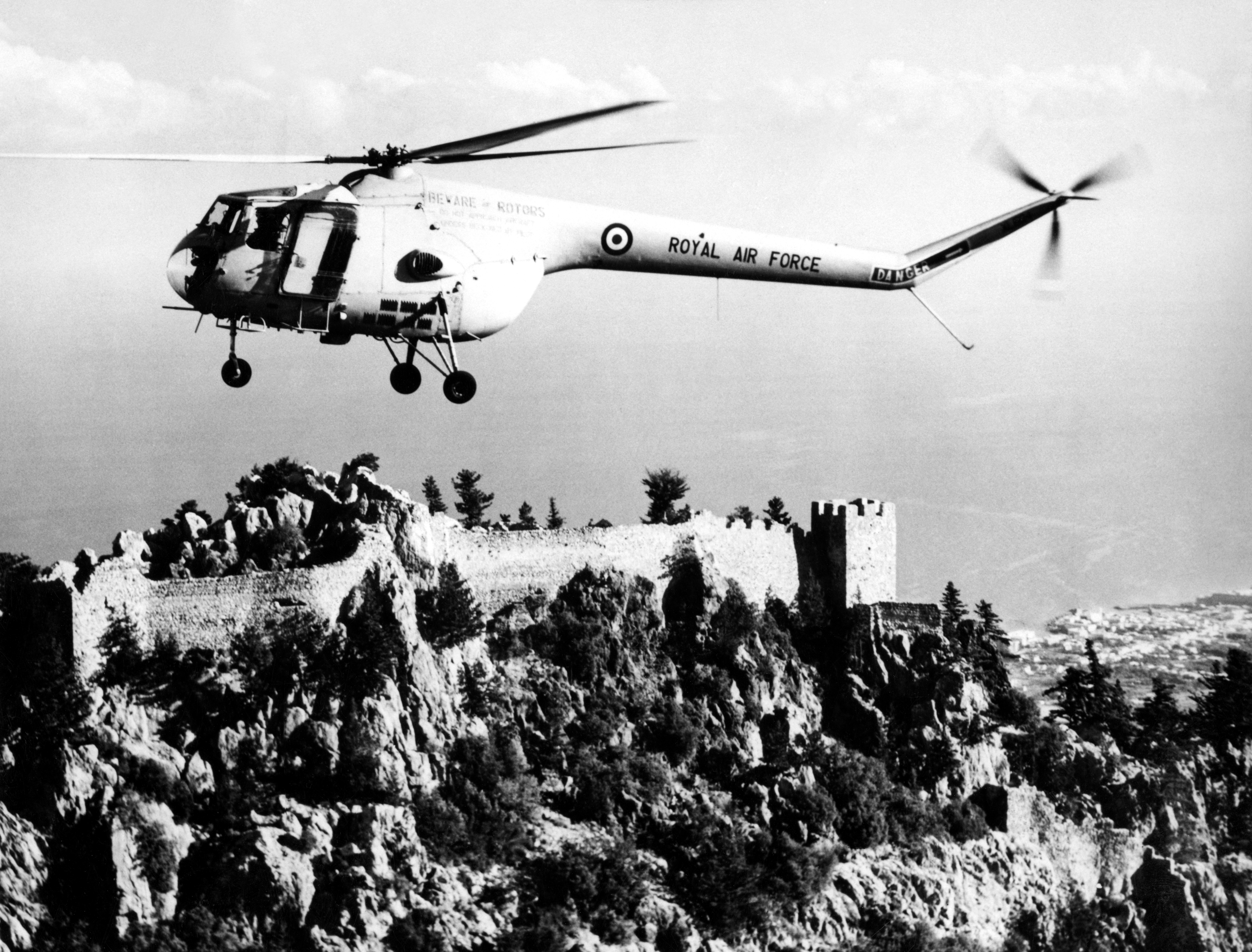
A Bristol Sycamore helicopter

== Aircraft operated ==
Aircraft operated by No. 110 Squadron
From	To	Aircraft	Variant	Notes
Nov 1917	Jul 1918	Royal Aircraft Factory B.E.2	2d, 2e	
Nov 1917	Jul 1918	Royal Aircraft Factory R.E.8		
Nov 1917	Jul 1918	Armstrong Whitworth F.K.3		
Nov 1917	Jul 1918	Airco DH.6		
Nov 1917	Jul 1918	Martinsyde G.100		A6293
Jan 1918	Jul 1918	Airco DH.4		
Feb 1918	Aug 1918	Airco DH.9		
Jul 1918	Aug 1919	Airco DH.9A		
Jul 1919	Aug 1919	Airco DH.9		
May 1937	Jun 1938	Hawker Hind		
Jan 1938	Aug 1939	Bristol Blenheim	Mk.I	
Jun 1939	Mar 1942	Bristol Blenheim	Mk.IV	
Oct 1942	Dec 1944	Vultee Vengeance	Mks.I, Ia, II	
Nov 1944	Jan 1945	Vultee Vengeance	Mks.III, IV	
Nov 1944	Apr 1946	de Havilland Mosquito	Mk.VI	
Jun 1946	Jul 1947	Douglas Dakota	C.3, C.4	
Sep 1947	Apr 1952	Douglas Dakota	C.4	
Oct 1951	Dec 1957	Vickers Valetta	C.1	
Jun 1959	Jul 1963	Westland Whirlwind	HC.4	
Apr 1960	Oct 1964	Bristol Sycamore	HR.14	
Jul 1963	Feb 1971	Westland Whirlwind	HAR.10	
