= Walton Airport =

Former airport of Lahore, Pakistan (1918–1962)

Coordinates: 31°29′41″N 074°20′46″E

Walton Airport, Lahore
- IATA: none; ICAO: OPLH

Summary
- Airport type: Private
- Operator: Pakistan Civil Aviation Authority (formerly)
- Serves: Lahore, Punjab, Pakistan
- Opened: 1918
- Closed: 1962
- Elevation AMSL: 679 ft (207 m)
- Interactive map of Walton Airport, Lahore

Runways
Direction	Length		Surface
Direction	m	ft	Surface
14/32	1,338	4,390	Concrete
- Source: DAFIF

Walton Airport (ICAO: OPLH), also known as Walton Airfield, was situated near Model Town, 10 km (6.2 mi) from the city centre of Lahore, in Punjab province of Pakistan. Now the area has been converted to CBD (Central Business District) Punjab. The airport was founded in 1918 and named after Sir Colonel Cusack Walton. The airport was active until 1962, when Allama Iqbal International Airport opened. It is now defunct for private usage as well.

It used to cater to general aviation and facilitates several flying clubs. The airport was one of the oldest in the country, and was spread over 300 acres.

== History ==
The airport was established in 1918. It was used by the British Army in World War II.

In 1930, the Lahore Flying Club was established (then known as Northern India Flying Club) at the site for training of pilots and is the oldest such facility. The 44 acres of land were donated by four Hindu doctors, while the remaining 256 acres were leased from the Government of Punjab, British India.

The airport is named after a former head of flying school, Sir Colonel Cusack Walton.

On 21st August 2021, the Government of Punjab leased the land to LCBDDA (Lahore Central Business District Development Authority) on a 99-year lease to develop and build a commercial business district with numerous high rises.

In 2025, the airport was replaced by Muridke Aerodrome.

== Clubs and Owners ==
*Lahore Flying Club

CFI Capt Anthony Chaudhry

*Department of Plant Protection

Chief Pilot Capt Muhammad Zaman Cheema

*Hybrid Aviation

CFI Capt Syed Yasir Razvi

*Airbone Aviation

CFI Capt Basit Ali

== See also ==
- List of airports in Pakistan
