= Westland Whirlwind (helicopter) =

1953 helicopter series by Westland

Whirlwind
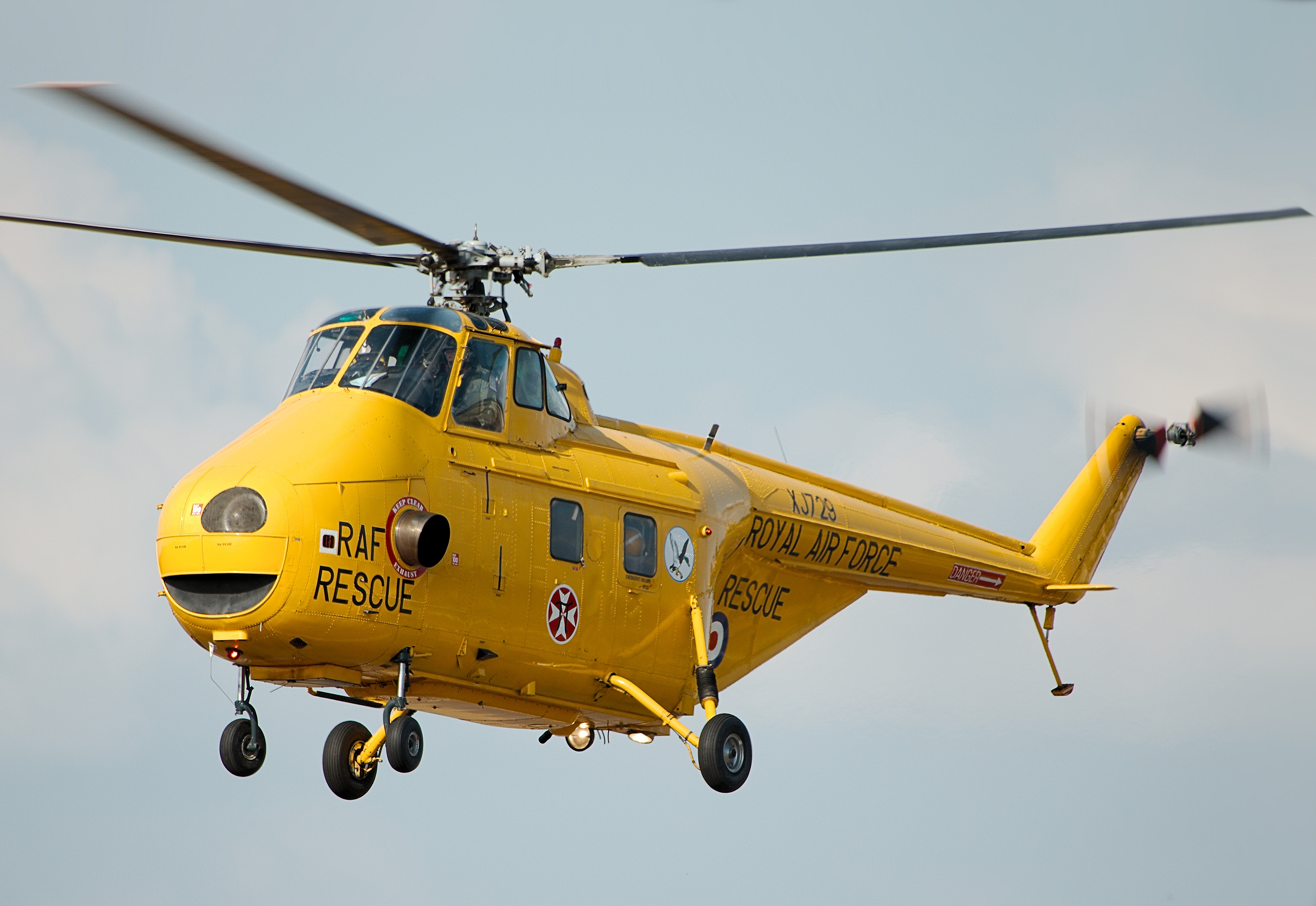
- A Royal Air Force Whirlwind HAR.10 of the RAF Search and Rescue Force at RIAT 2018

General information
- Type: Helicopter
- National origin: United Kingdom
- Manufacturer: Westland Aircraft
- Primary users: Royal Navy Royal Air Force list
- Number built: 360+

History
- Manufactured: 1953–1966
- Introduction date: 1954
- First flight: August 1953
- Retired: 1982
- Developed from: Sikorsky H-19

The Westland Whirlwind helicopter is a British licence-built version of the U.S. Sikorsky S-55/H-19 Chickasaw. It primarily served with the Royal Navy's Fleet Air Arm in anti-submarine and search and rescue roles. It was also exported to other countries, and the Whirlwind was succeeded by the turbine powered Westland Wessex (based on the Sikorsky H-34) which was developed from the H-19/Whirlwind. The helicopter was made in many variants using a variety of radial (piston) and turbine engines.

Whirlwind helicopters fitted with turbine power served until the early 1980s, and a converted Whirlwind was in the Queen's Flight.

== Design and development ==
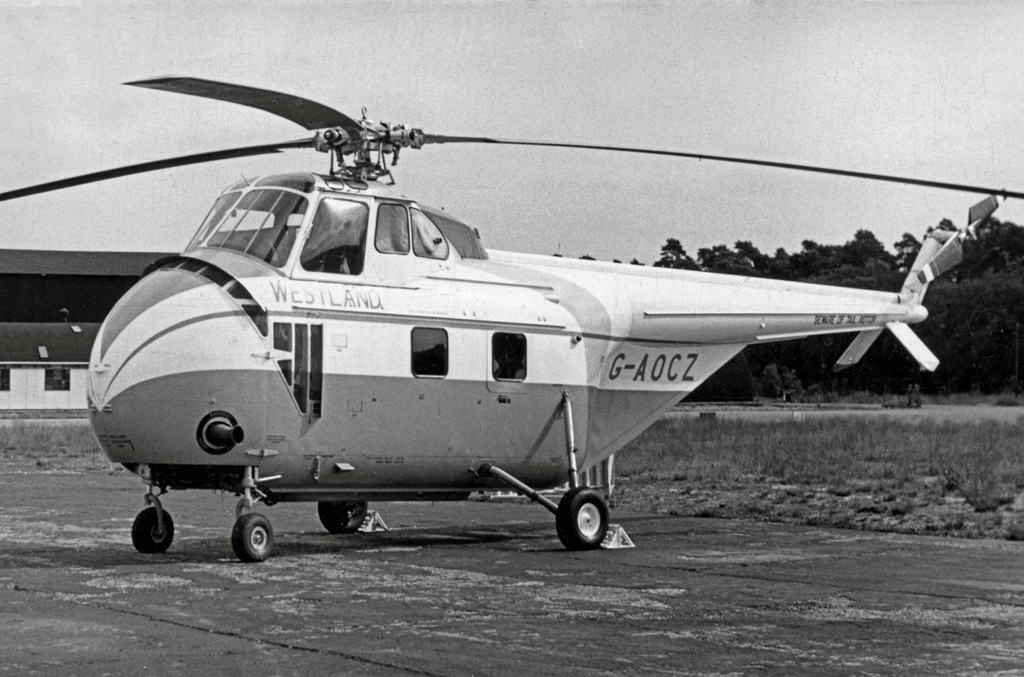
Whirlwind Series 1 demonstrator fitted with P&W R-1340 in 1955

In 1950, Westland Aircraft, already building the American Sikorsky S-51 under licence as the Westland Dragonfly, purchased the rights to manufacture and sell Sikorsky's larger Sikorsky S-55 helicopter. While a Sikorsky-built pattern aircraft was flown by Westland in June 1951, converting the design to meet British standards (including the provision of a revised main-rotor gearbox), was time-consuming, and the first prototype British aircraft, registered G-AMJT, powered by the 600 hp Pratt & Whitney R-1340-40 Wasp did not fly until August 1953. This was followed by ten Whirlwind HAR.1s, which entered service shortly afterwards. They served in non-combat roles, including search and rescue and communications functions. The HAR.3 had a larger 700 hp Wright R-1300-3 Cyclone 7 engine.

The performance of early versions was limited by the power of the American Wasp or Cyclone engines, and in 1955, the HAR.5, powered by an uprated engine, the Alvis Leonides Major, flew for the first time. This was followed by the similarly powered HAS.7, which became the first British helicopter designed for anti-submarine warfare in the front-line when it entered service in 1957. It could either be equipped with a dipping Sonar for submarine detection or carry a torpedo, but could not carry both simultaneously, so sonar equipped "Hunters" were used to direct torpedo armed "Killers". The HAS.7 was powered by a 750 hp (560 kW) Alvis Leonides Major 755/1 radial engine. It had a hovering ceiling at 9,400 ft (2,900 m) and a range of 334 miles at 86 mph.

In 1960 Westland introduced a Whirlwind powered by the 1,000 hp Bristol Siddeley Gnome turboshaft, the greater power giving much improved performance over the earlier piston-engined variants; helicopters receiving this modification were redesignated as the HAR.9. The Gnome featured an early computer controlled fuel system that removed variations in engine power and made for much easier handling by the pilot.

More than 400 Whirlwinds were built, of which nearly 100 were exported to foreign customers.

Some Whirlwinds were converted to turbine power and served well into the 1970s.

== Operational service ==
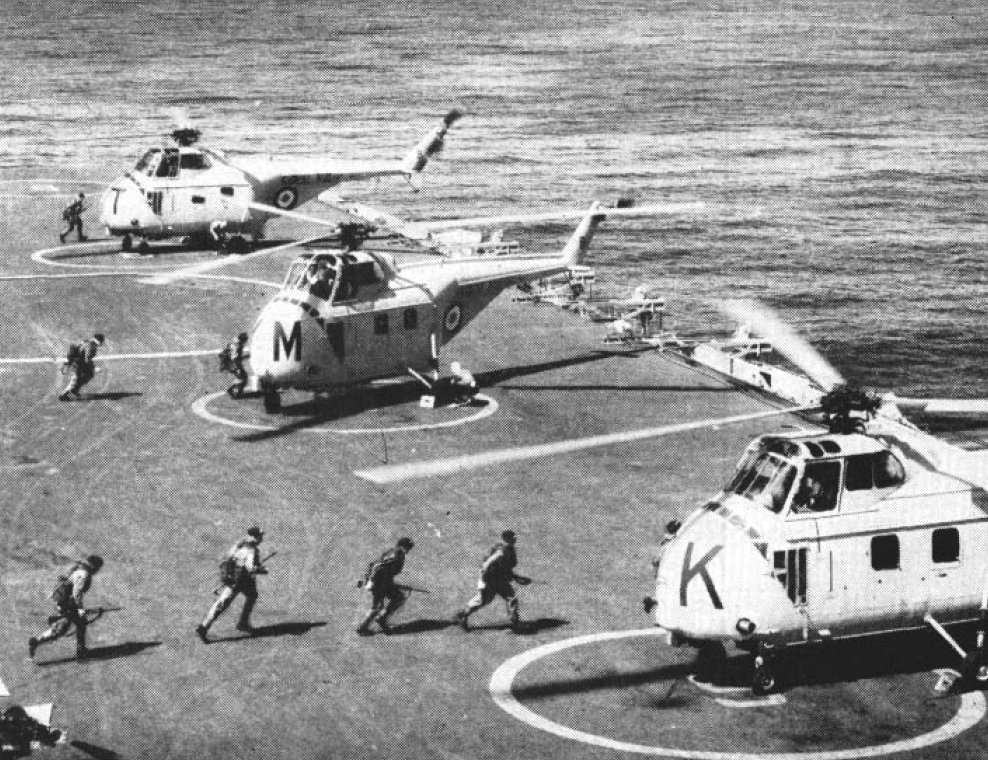
Whirlwind helicopters on a Royal Navy ship

848 Naval Air Squadron of the Royal Navy's Fleet Air Arm was the first squadron to receive HAR.1s, which replaced Sikorsky-built HAR.21 versions of the Whirlwind, for utility and search-and-rescue service from July 1954. After entering service with the Royal Navy, the Whirlwind also entered service with the Royal Air Force and French Navy, which received 37 Whirlwind HAR.2 between 1954 and 1957.

The Royal Air Force Air Sea Rescue Services used Whirlwinds painted in overall yellow for rescuing people in distress around the coast of the United Kingdom. Westland Wessex, and eventually Westland Sea King, helicopters later supplemented and eventually replaced Whirlwinds in this role.

The last Whirlwind was retired from service in 1982, and the last HAR.10 in 1981.

Two upgraded Whirlwinds (HCC.8 models) were added to the Queen's Flight in 1959, and eventually replaced by the Wessex helicopter.

== Variants ==
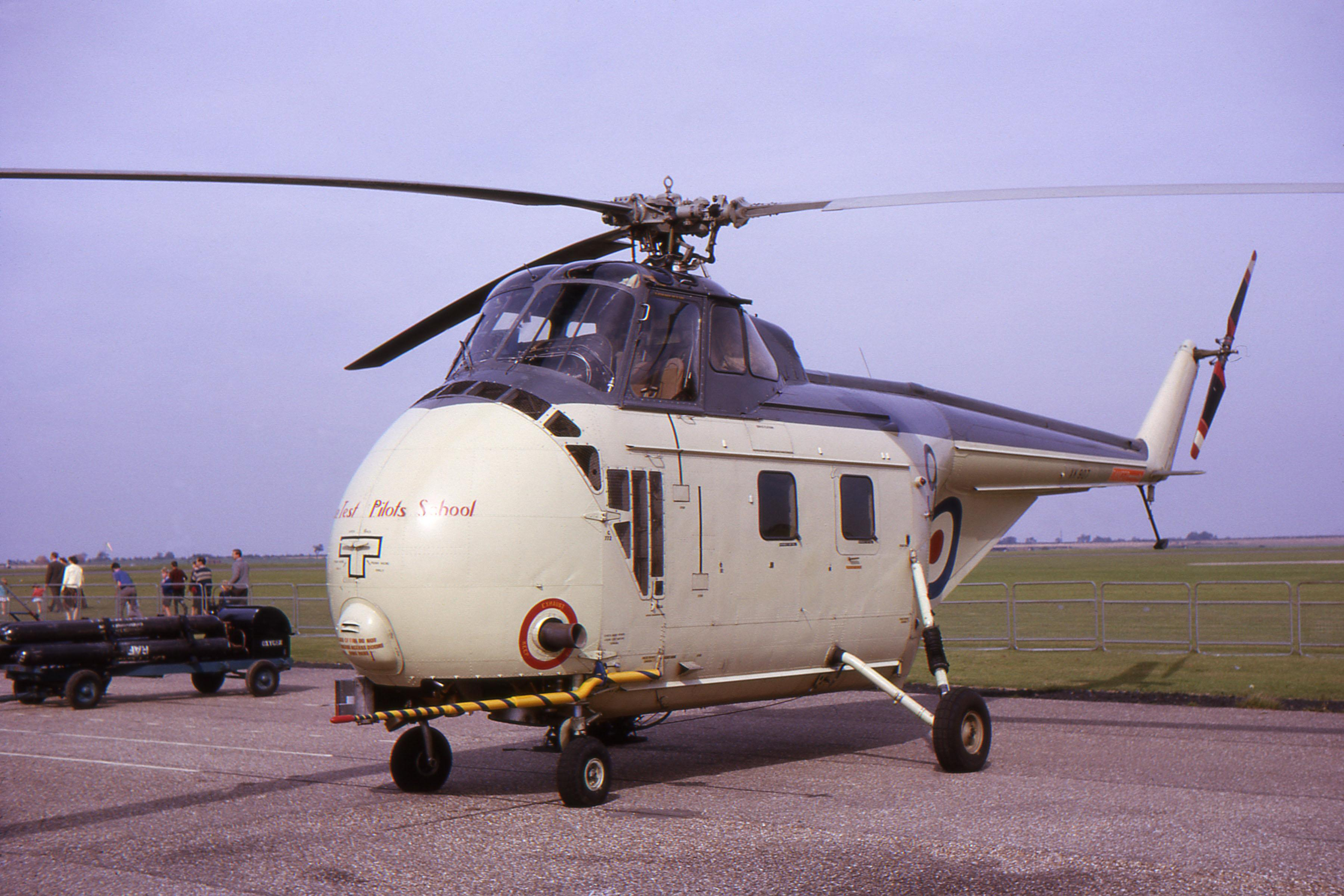
Whirlwind HAS.7 of the Empire Test Pilots' School, 1963

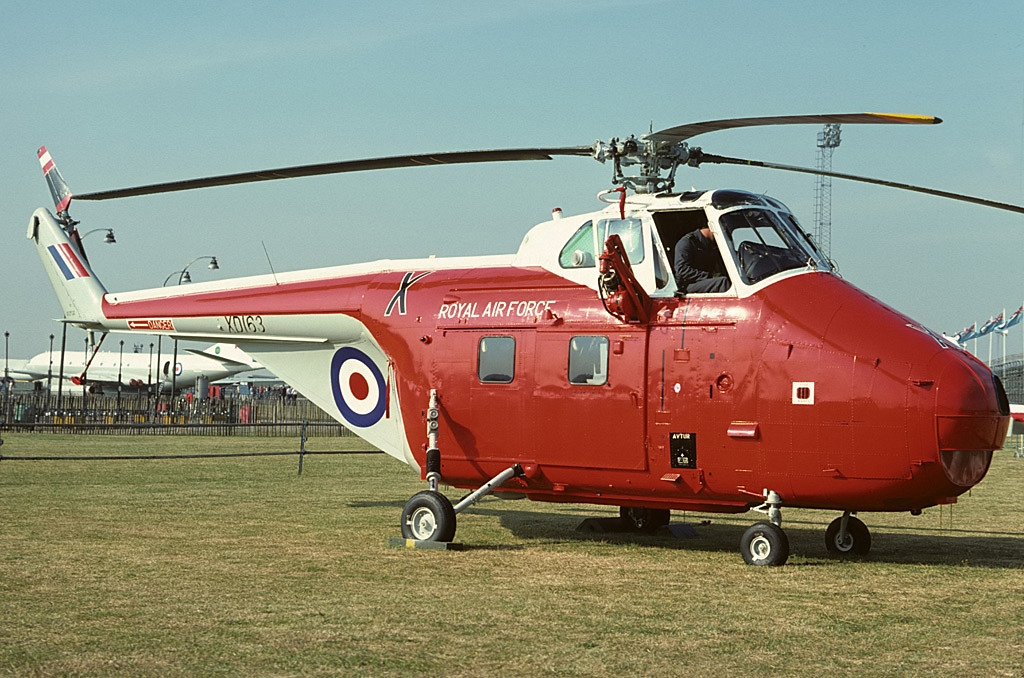
Whirlwind HAR.10 of the Central Flying School, 1977. It was just painted for the Queen's Silver Jubilee Royal Review

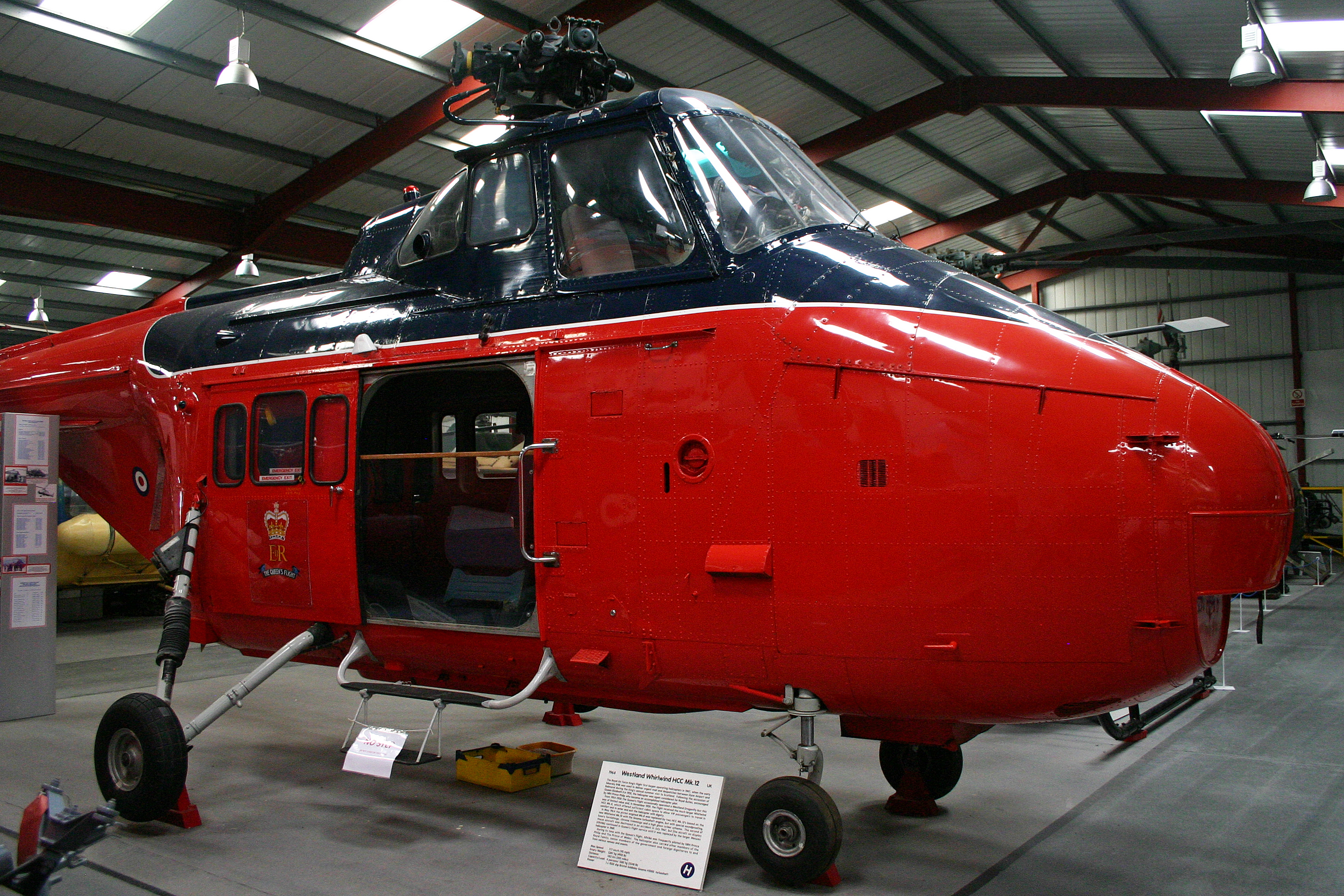
Whirlwind HCC.12 of the Royal Flight in The Helicopter Museum, 2011

WS-55 Series 1
44 built; American engines (Pratt & Whitney R-1340-40 Wasp), transport helicopters for military and civilian use
WS-55 Series 2
19 built; Alvis engines (Alvis Leonides Major 755), civilian use
WS-55 Series 3
5 built; Gnome turboshaft (Bristol Siddeley Gnome 101), civilian use
HAR.1
10 built; RN service; Search and rescue
HAR.2
33 built; RAF service from 1955
HC.2
RAF service
HAR.3
25 built; RN service; Wright R-1300 Cyclone 7 engine
HAR.4
24 built; Improved HAR.2 for hot and high conditions, RAF service
HAR.5
3 built; Alvis Leonides Major engine and a 3 degree droop of the tail boom for increased main rotor clearance; RN service
HAR.6
1 ordered with Turbomeca Twin Turmo engine but completed as an HAR.5
HAR.7
40 built; RN duties – 6 converted to HAR.9's
HAS.7
89 built; RN anti-submarine duties – 1 torpedo; 12 used as Royal Marine transports, 6 converted to HAR.9's
HCC.8
2 built; Royal Flight transport, VIP later converted to HAR.10's
HAR.9
12 conversions of HAS.7 and HAR.7 with a Bristol Siddeley Gnome gas turbine replacing the Leonides Major engine, RN service
HC.10
RAF service
HAR.10
68 built; powered by a Bristol Siddeley Gnome turboshaft, RAF service, transport and air-sea rescue
HCC.12
2 built; Royal Flight,

The model numbers for the US-built evaluation models were

HAR.21
10 built by Sikorsky; rescue. Equivalent to US Marine HRS-2.
HAS.22
15 built by Sikorsky; anti-submarine. Equivalent to HO4S-3.
HU2W
Brazilian Navy designation for the WS-55 Series 1.
UH-5
Brazilian Navy designation for the WS-55 Series 3. Originally designated SH-3 prior to the adoption of the Sikorsky SH-3 Sea King.

== Operators ==
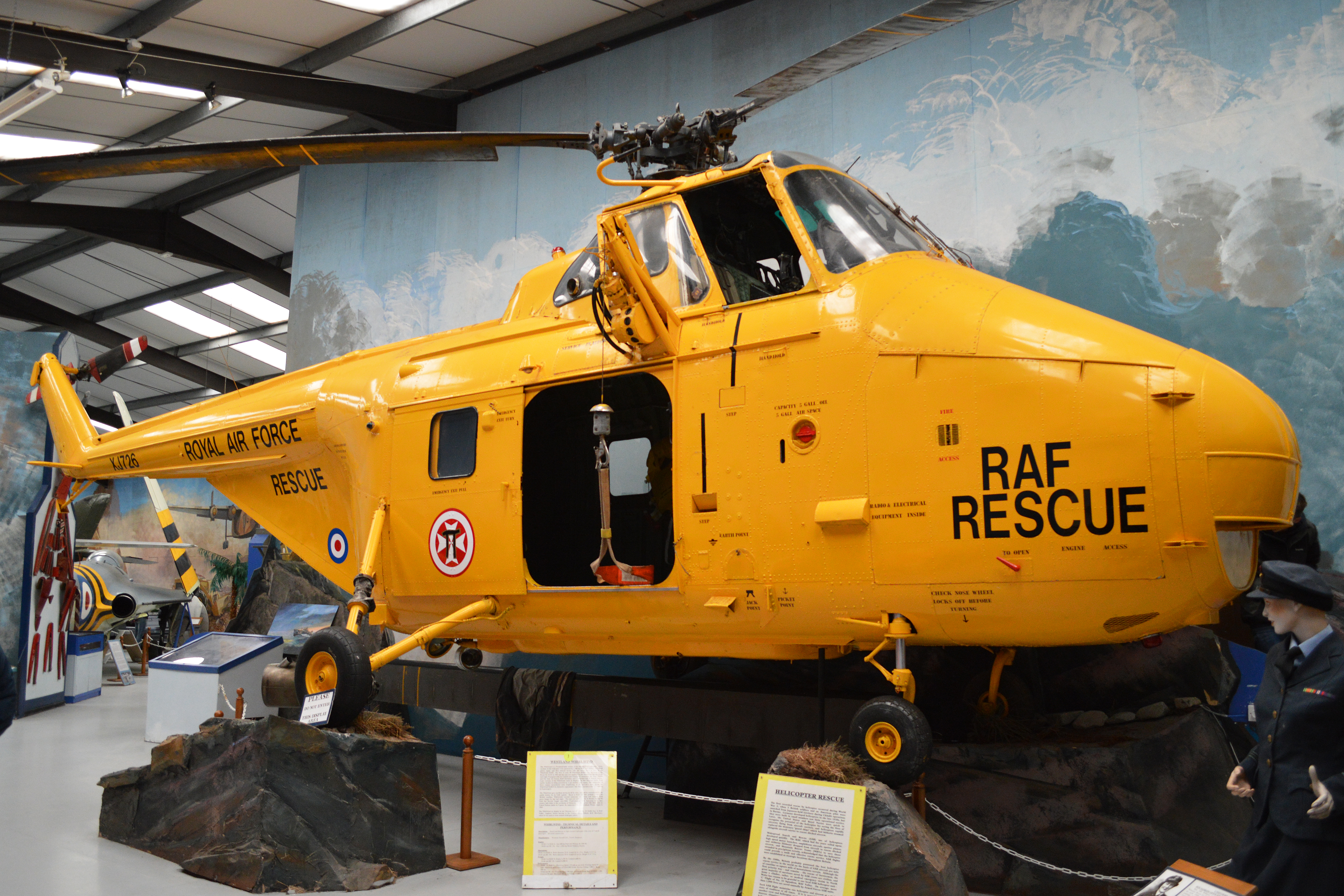
XJ726 – HAR 10 used by the Royal Air Force

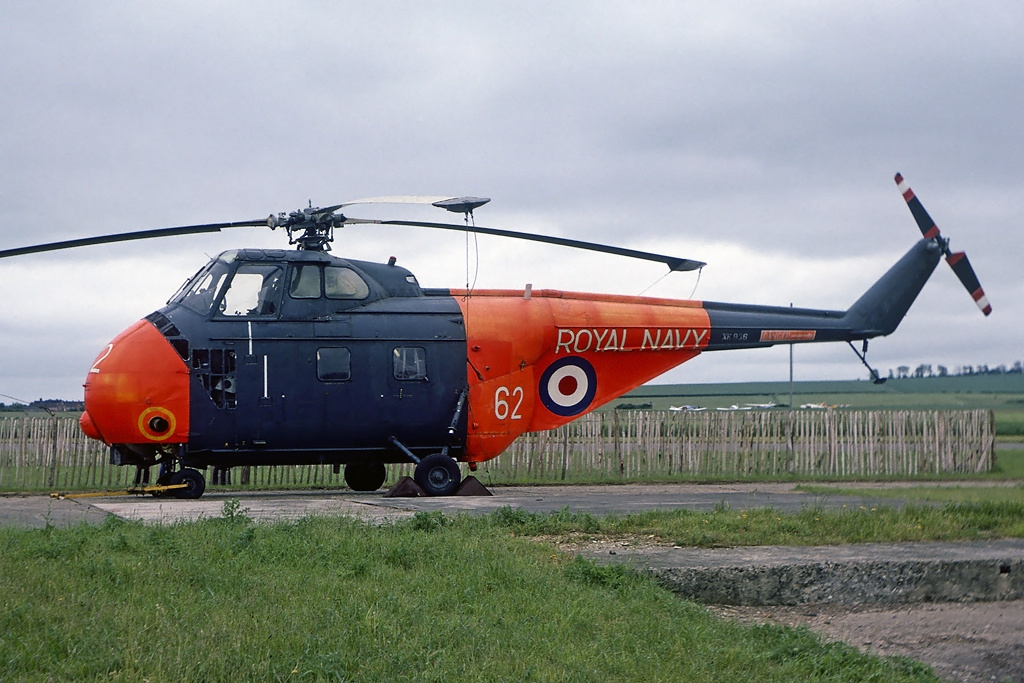
XK936 – HAS 7 used by the Royal Navy

=== Military operators ===
Austria
Austrian Air Force
Brazil
Brazilian Naval Aviation
Brunei
Cuba
France
Ghana
Iran
Italy
Kuwait
Nigeria
Qatar
United Kingdom
Yugoslavia
19 helicopters

=== Civil operators ===
United Kingdom

== Surviving aircraft ==
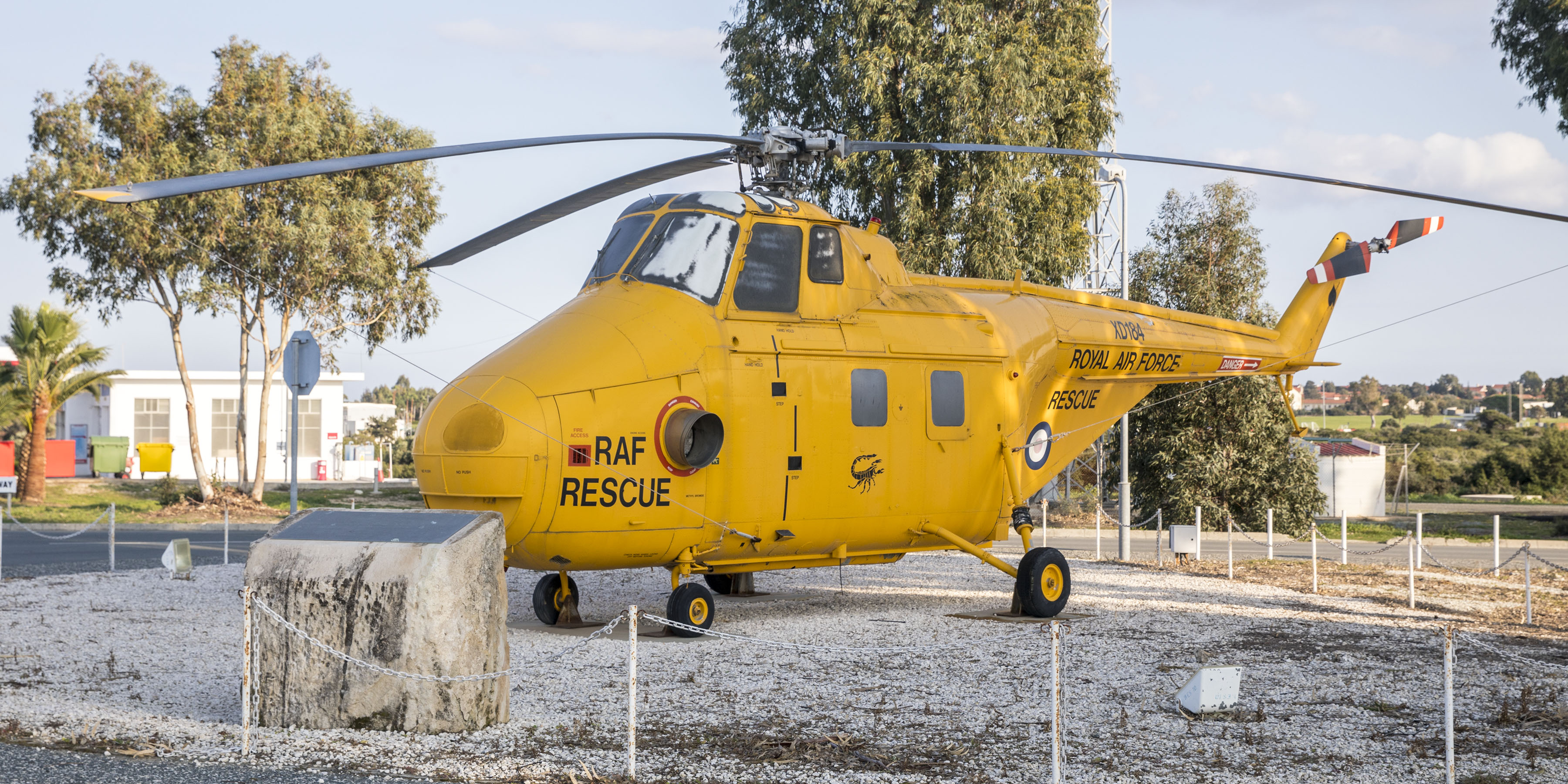
Whirlwind helicopter (XD184), previously of 1563 Flt and No. 84 Squadron, at RAF Akrotiri, Cyprus

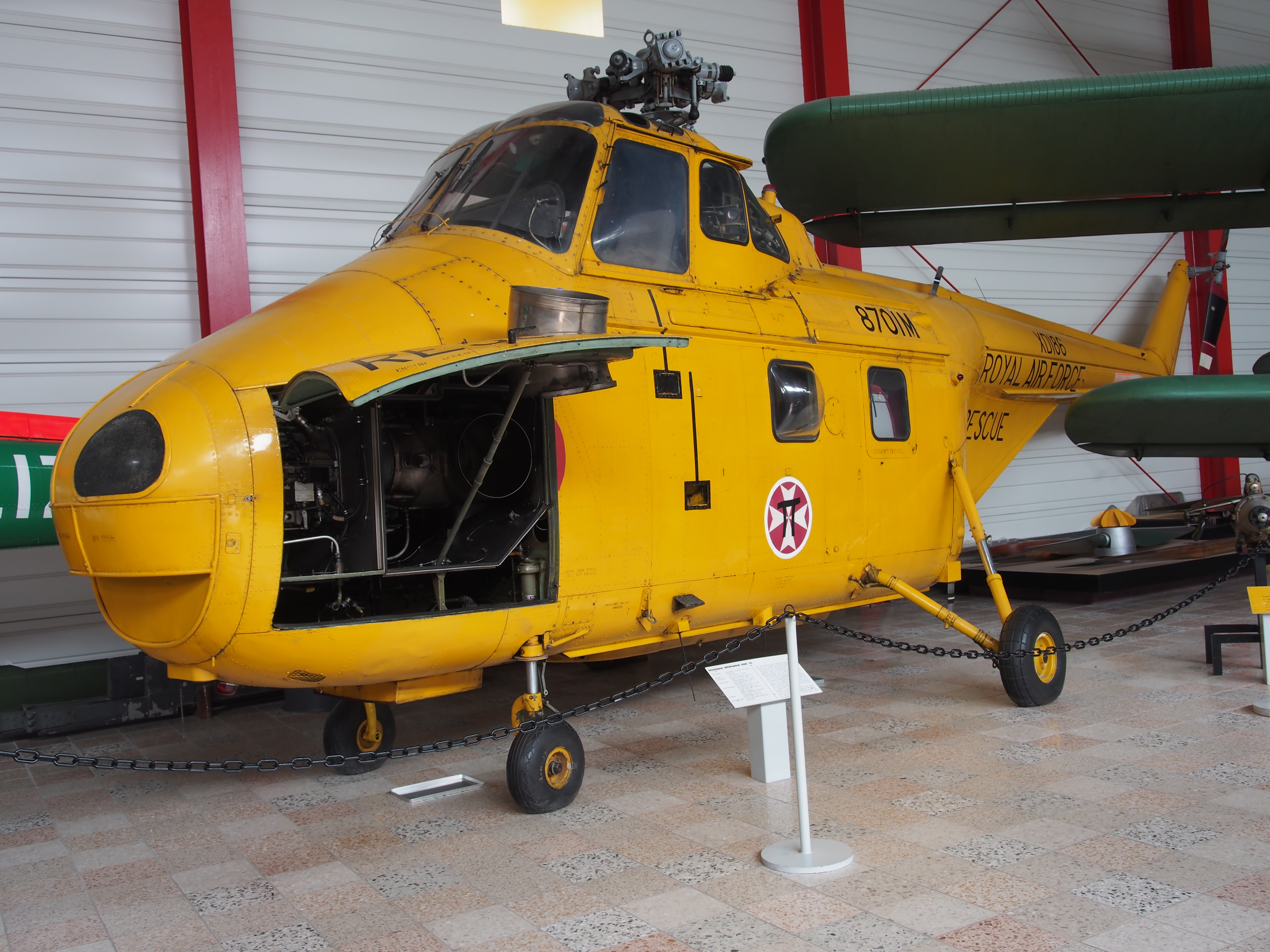
Royal Air Force Rescue Whirlwind HAR.10 in Hermeskeil, Germany.

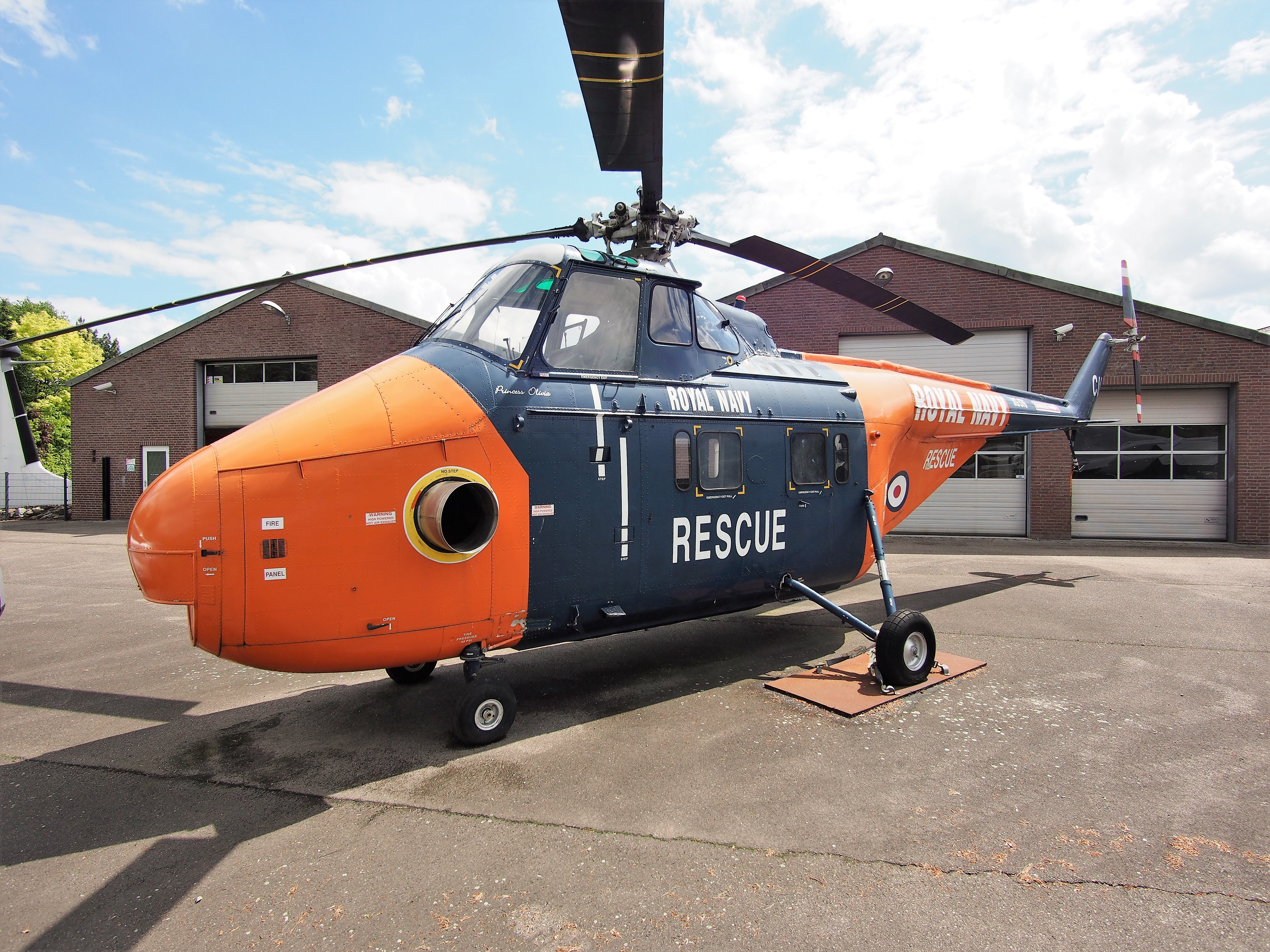
HAR.3 version which used a Wright R-1300 Cyclone 7, in the Netherlands

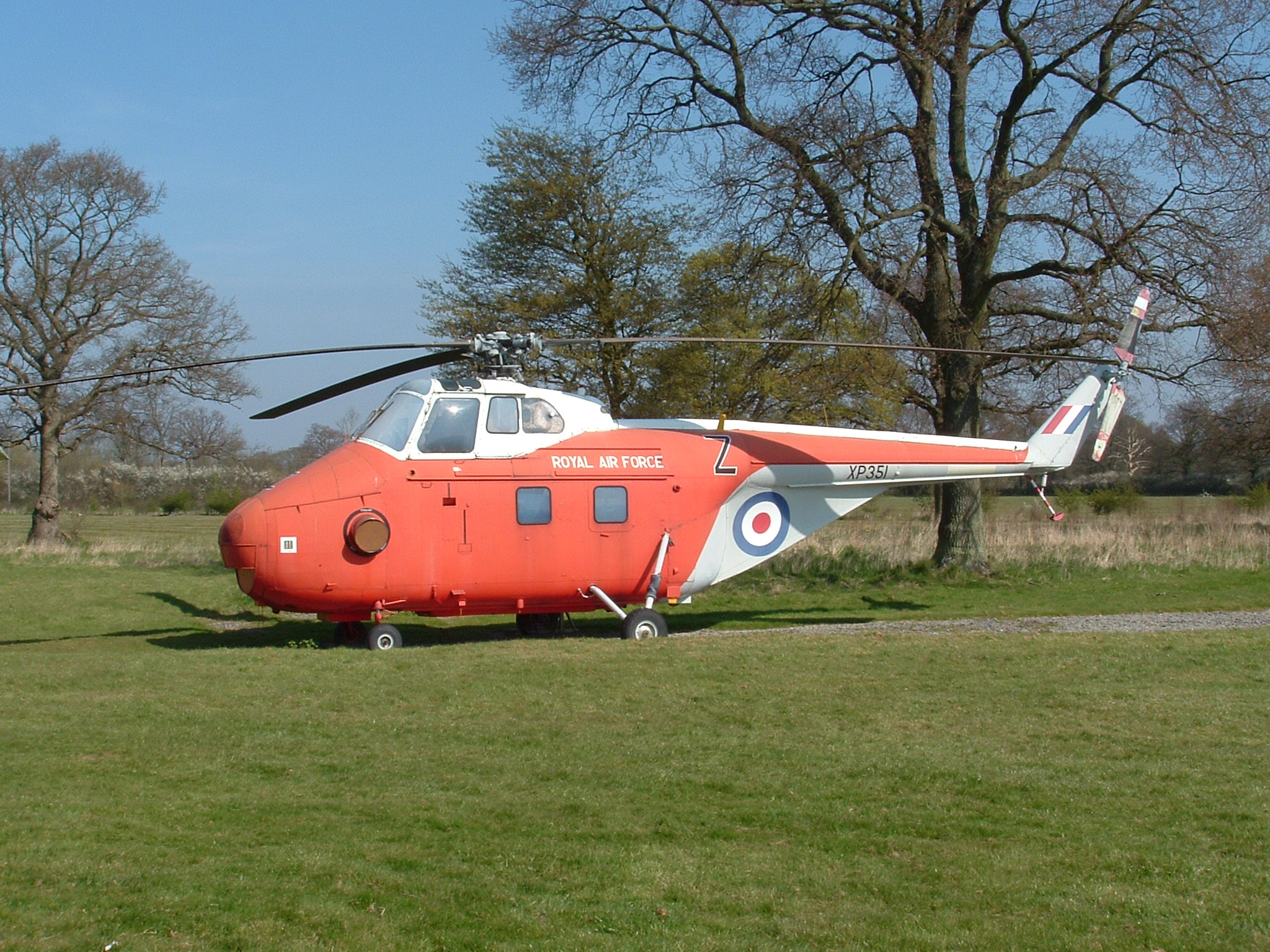
Whirlwind on display near London

=== Cyprus ===
- XD184 – HAR.10 on static display at RAF Akrotiri as a gate guardian

=== Germany ===
- XD186 – HAR.10 on static display at Flugausstellung Hermeskeil in Hermeskeil, Rhineland-Palatinate.
- XP352 – HAR.10 on static display at Flugausstellung Hermeskeil in Hermeskeil, Rhineland-Palatinate.

=== Netherlands ===
- XG576 – HAR.3 on static display at PS Aero in Baarlo, Limburg.

=== United Kingdom ===
- G-ANFH Sir Ector Series 1 on static display at The Helicopter Museum in Weston-super-Mare, Somerset
- WA.113 – Series 3 on static display at The Helicopter Museum in Weston-super-Mare, Somerset.
- WA.298 – Series 3 on static display at the Midland Air Museum in Baginton, Warwickshire.
- WV198 – HAR.21 on static display at the Solway Aviation Museum in Crosby-on-Eden, Cumbria.
- XA864 – HAR.1 in storage at the Fleet Air Arm Museum in Yeovil, Somerset.
- XA870 – HAR.1 on static display at the South Yorkshire Aircraft Museum in Doncaster, South Yorkshire. Owned by the Yorkshire Helicopter Preservation Group.
- XD163 – HAR.10 on static display at The Helicopter Museum in Weston-super-Mare, Somerset.
- XG574 – HAR.3 on display at the Fleet Air Arm Museum in Yeovil, Somerset.
- XG588 – Series 3 on static display at East Midlands Aeropark in Castle Donington, Leicestershire.
- XG594 – HAS.7 in storage at the Fleet Air Arm Museum in Yeovil, Somerset.
- XJ398 – HAR.10 on static display at the South Yorkshire Aircraft Museum in Doncaster, South Yorkshire. Owned by the Yorkshire Helicopter Preservation Group.
- XJ723 – HAR.10 on static display at Morayvia in Kinloss, Moray.
- XJ726 – HAR.10 on static display at Caernarfon Airworld Museum in Dinas Dinlle, Gwynedd.
- XJ729 – HAR.10 airworthy with Historic Helicopters in Crewkerne, Somerset.
- XK936 – HAS.7 on static display at the Imperial War Museum Duxford in Duxford, Cambridgeshire.
- XK940 – HAS.7 on static display at The Helicopter Museum in Weston-super-Mare, Somerset.
- XL853 – HAS.7 in storage at the Fleet Air Arm Museum in Yeovil, Somerset.
- XL875 – HAR.9 at Air Service Training in Perth.
- XN258 – HAR.9 on static display at the North East Land, Sea and Air Museums in Sunderland, Tyne and Wear.
- XN304 – HAS.7 on static display at the Norfolk and Suffolk Aviation Museum in Flixton, Suffolk.
- XN380 – HAS.7 under restoration for static display at the RAF Manston History Museum in Ramsgate, Kent.
- XN386 – HAS.9 on static display at the South Yorkshire Aircraft Museum in Doncaster, South Yorkshire. Owned by the Yorkshire Helicopter Preservation Group.
- XP299 – HAR.10 on static display at the Royal Air Force Museum London in London.
- XP345 – HAR.10 on static display at the South Yorkshire Aircraft Museum in Doncaster, South Yorkshire. Owned by the Yorkshire Helicopter Preservation Group.
- XP346 – HAR.10 on static display at All Things Wild in Evesham, Worcestershire.
- XP355 – HAR.10 on static display at the City of Norwich Aviation Museum in Horsham St Faith, Norfolk.
- XR453 – HAR.10 on static display at RAF Odiham in Odiham, Hampshire.
- XR485 – HAR.10 on static display at the Norfolk and Suffolk Aviation Museum in Flixton, Suffolk.
- XR486 – HCC.12 on static display at The Helicopter Museum in Weston-super-Mare, Somerset.

=== United States ===
- XJ763 - HAR.10 on static display at the Wings of Eagles Discovery Center in Elmira, New York

== Specifications (Whirlwind HAS.7) ==
Data from Westland Aircraft since 1915

General characteristics

- Crew: 2 pilots
- Length: 41 ft 8 1/2 in (12.713 m)
- Height: 15 ft 7 1/2 in (4.763 m)
- Empty weight: 5,993 lb (2,718 kg)
- Max takeoff weight: 7,800 lb (3,538 kg)
- Powerplant: 1 × Alvis Leonides Major 755 14-cylinder two-row radial engine, 750 hp (560 kW)
- Main rotor diameter: 53 ft 0 in (16.15 m)
- Main rotor area: 2,205 sq ft (204.9 m^{2})

Performance

- Maximum speed: 109 mph (175 km/h, 95 kn)
- Range: 334 mi (538 km, 290 nmi)
- Service ceiling: 13,000 ft (4,000 m)
- Rate of climb: 910 ft/min (4.6 m/s)

Armament

- 1x Mark 30 or Mark 44 torpedo or Depth charges (carried in place of dipping sonar)

== In popular culture ==
In the Beatles first film, A Hard Day's Night, the group is seen flying away from the concert venue at the end of the film on the BEA Whirlwind, G-ANFH. The same aircraft appeared in the 1960 film, The Murderers and the 1963 Oliver Reed film, The Damned.

The character of Harold the Helicopter from The Railway Series and Thomas & Friends is based on a Westland Whirlwind with fitted pontoons.

== See also ==
Related development

- Sikorsky H-19 Chickasaw
- Sikorsky H-34
  - Westland Wessex

Aircraft of comparable role, configuration, and era

- Mil Mi-4
- Harbin Z-5
