= Boeing CH-47 Chinook =

American tandem-rotor helicopter introduced in 1962 during the Cold War

CH-47 Chinook
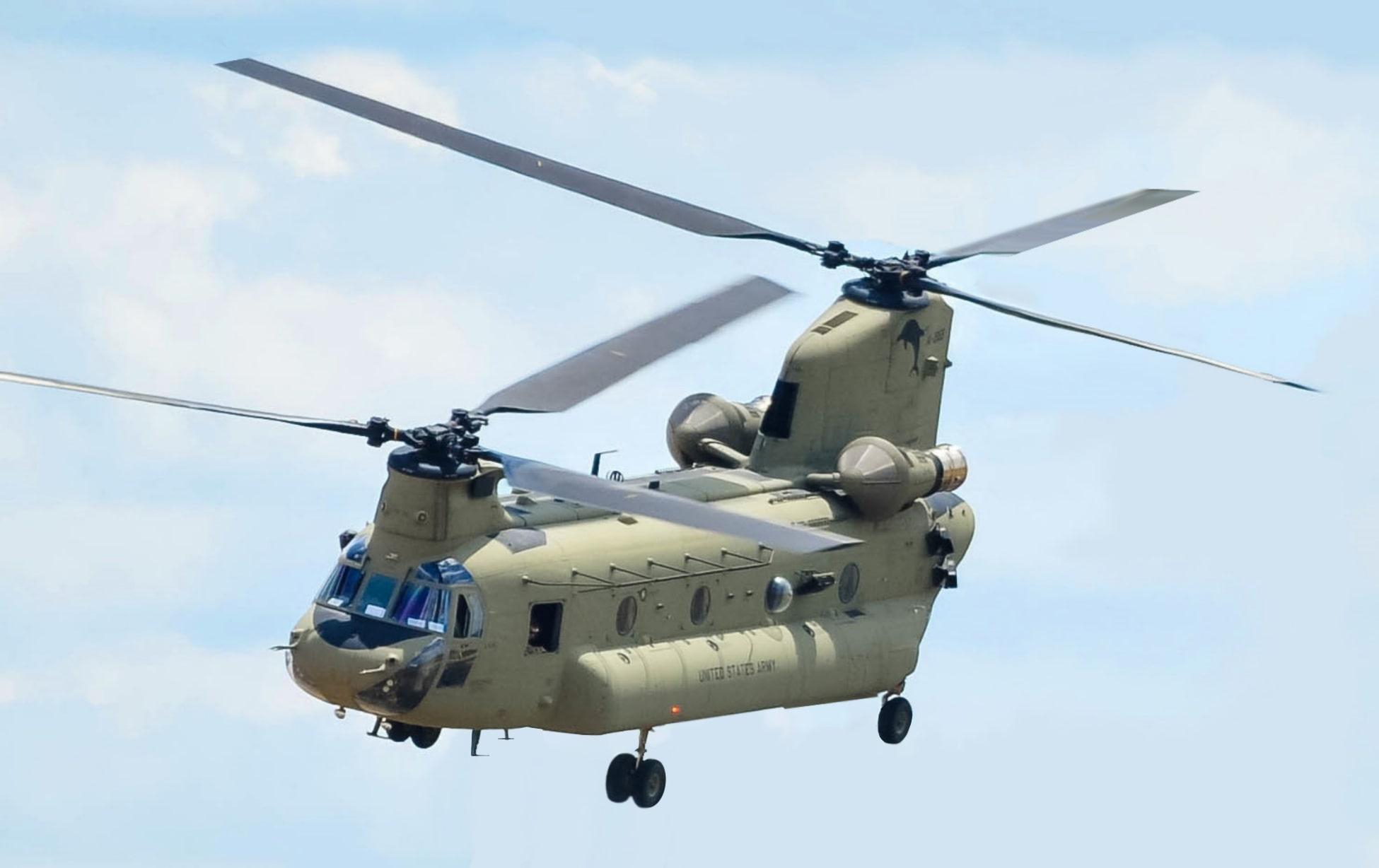
- A U.S. Army CH-47F in 2017

General information
- Type: Transport helicopter
- National origin: United States
- Manufacturer: Boeing Defense, Space & Security
- Status: In service
- Primary users: United States Army Japan Ground Self-Defense Force; Royal Saudi Air Force; See Operators for others
- Number built: Over 1,200 as of 2012

History
- Manufactured: 1962–present
- Introduction date: 1962
- First flight: 21 September 1961
- Developed from: Vertol Model 107
- Variant: Boeing Chinook (UK variants)
- Developed into: Boeing Vertol BV-347

The Boeing CH-47 Chinook is a tandem-rotor helicopter originally developed by American rotorcraft company Vertol and now manufactured by Boeing Defense, Space & Security. The Chinook is the second-heaviest-lifting Western heavy-lift helicopter, behind the Sikorsky CH-53. Its name comes from the Chinook people, who are indigenous to the Pacific Northwest of the United States.

The Chinook was designed by Vertol, which had begun work in 1957 on a new tandem-rotor helicopter, designated as the Vertol Model 107 or V-107. Around the same time, the United States Department of the Army announced its intention to replace the piston-engine–powered Sikorsky CH-37 Mojave with a new, gas turbine–powered helicopter. During June 1958, the U.S. Army ordered a small number of V-107s from Vertol under the YHC-1A designation; following testing, some Army officials considered it to be too heavy for the assault missions and too light for transport purposes. While the YHC-1A would be improved and adopted by the U.S. Marine Corps as the CH-46 Sea Knight, the Army sought a heavier transport helicopter and ordered an enlarged derivative of the V-107 with the Vertol designation Model 114. Initially designated as the YHC-1B, on 21 September 1961, the preproduction rotorcraft performed its maiden flight. In 1962, the HC-1B was redesignated CH-47A under the 1962 United States Tri-Service aircraft designation system. Boeing had purchased Vertol in 1960, forming the Vertol division of Boeing, leading to some early production variants being produced as Boeing Vertol CH-47 Chinook.

The Chinook possesses several means of loading various cargoes, including multiple doors across the fuselage, a wide loading ramp located at the rear of the fuselage, and three external ventral cargo hooks to carry underslung loads. Capable of a top speed of 170 knots (200 mph; 310 km/h), upon its introduction to service in 1962, the helicopter was considerably faster than contemporary 1960s utility helicopters and attack helicopters, and is still one of the fastest helicopters in the US inventory. Improved and more powerful versions of the Chinook have also been developed since its introduction; one of the most substantial variants to be produced was the CH-47D, which first entered service in 1982; improvements from the CH-47C standard included upgraded engines, composite rotor blades, a redesigned cockpit to reduce workload, improved and redundant electrical systems and avionics, and the adoption of an advanced flight control system. It remains one of the few aircraft to be developed during the early 1960s – along with the fixed-wing Lockheed C-130 Hercules cargo aircraft – that has remained in both production and frontline service for over 60 years.

The military version of the helicopter has been exported to various nations; the U.S. Army and the Royal Air Force (see Boeing Chinook (UK variants)) have been its two largest users. The civilian version of the Chinook is the Boeing Vertol 234. It has been used by civil operators not only for passenger and cargo transport, but also for aerial firefighting and to support logging, construction, and oil-extraction industries.

== Design and development ==
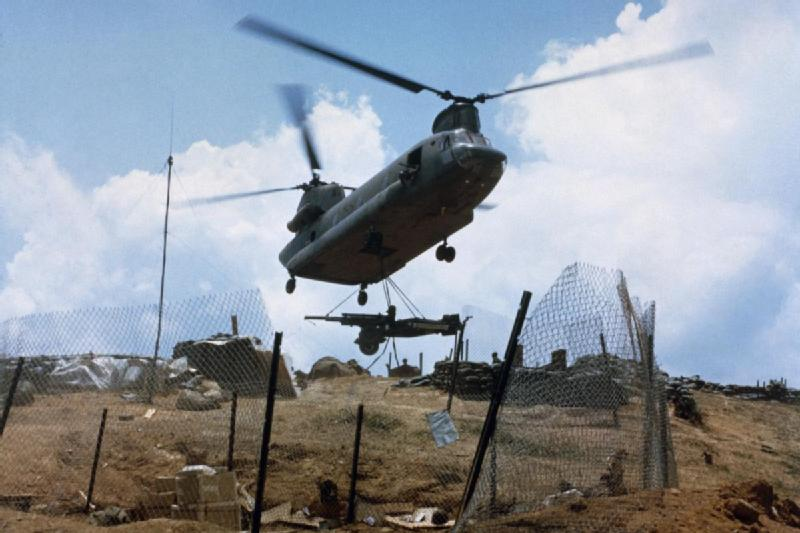
CH-47 carries a howitzer, 1970

=== Initial development ===
During late 1956, the U.S. Department of the Army announced its intention to replace the Sikorsky CH-37 Mojave, which was powered by piston engines, with a new, gas turbine-powered helicopter. Turbine engines were also a key design feature of the smaller UH-1 "Huey" utility helicopter. Following a design competition, in September 1958, a joint Army–Air Force source selection board recommended that the Army procure the Vertol-built medium-transport helicopter. Funding for full-scale development was not then available, though, and the Army vacillated on its design requirements. Some officials in Army Aviation thought that the new helicopter should be operated as a light tactical transport aimed at taking over the missions of the old piston-engined Piasecki H-21 and Sikorsky H-34 helicopters, and be consequently capable of carrying about 15 troops (one squad). Another faction in Army Aviation thought that the new helicopter should be much larger, enabling it to airlift large artillery pieces and possess enough internal space to carry the new MGM-31 "Pershing" missile system.

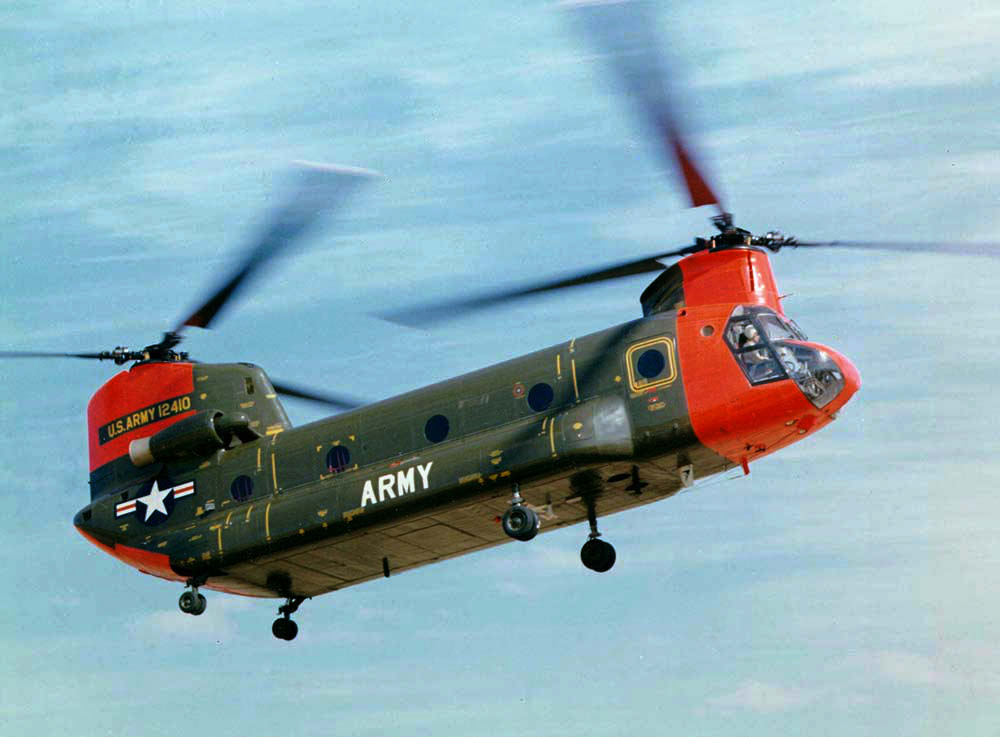
HC-1B during in-flight evaluation

During 1957, Vertol commenced work upon a new tandem-rotor helicopter, designated as the Vertol Model 107 or V-107. During June 1958, the U.S. Army awarded a contract to Vertol for the acquisition of a small number of the rotorcraft, giving it the YHC-1A designation. As ordered, the YHC-1A possessed the capacity to carry a maximum of 20 troops. Three underwent testing by the Army for deriving engineering and operational data. However, the YHC-1A was considered by many figures within the Army users to be too heavy for the assault role, while too light for the more general transport role. Accordingly, a decision was made to procure a heavier transport helicopter, and at the same time, upgrade the UH-1 "Huey" to serve as the needed tactical troop transport. The YHC-1A would be improved and adopted by the Marines as the CH-46 Sea Knight in 1962. As a result, the Army issued a new order to Vertol for an enlarged derivative of the V-107, known by internal company designation as the Model 114, which it gave the designation of HC-1B. On 21 September 1961, the preproduction Boeing Vertol YHC-1B made its initial hovering flight. During 1962, the HC-1B was redesignated the CH-47A under the 1962 United States Tri-Service aircraft designation system; it was also named "Chinook" after the Chinook people of the Pacific Northwest.

Chinook helicopter flying overhead in Greenwich, London
The distinctive sound of the Chinook helicopter, recorded May 2016.

The CH-47 is powered by two turboshaft engines, mounted on each side of the helicopter's rear pylon and connected to three-blade rotors by drive shafts. Initial models were fitted with Lycoming T55 engines rated at 2,200 hp (1,600 kW) each. The counter-rotating rotors eliminate the need for an antitorque vertical rotor, allowing all power to be used for lift and thrust. The ability to adjust lift in either rotor makes it less sensitive to changes in the center of gravity, important for the cargo lifting and dropping. While hovering over a specific location, a twin-rotor helicopter has increased stability over a single rotor when weight is added or removed, for example, when troops drop from or begin climbing up ropes to the aircraft, or when other cargo is dropped. If one engine fails, the other can drive both rotors. The "sizing" of the Chinook was directly related to the growth of the Huey and the Army's tacticians' insistence that initial air assaults be built around the squad. The Army pushed for both the Huey and the Chinook, and this focus was responsible for the acceleration of its air mobility effort.

=== Improved and later versions ===
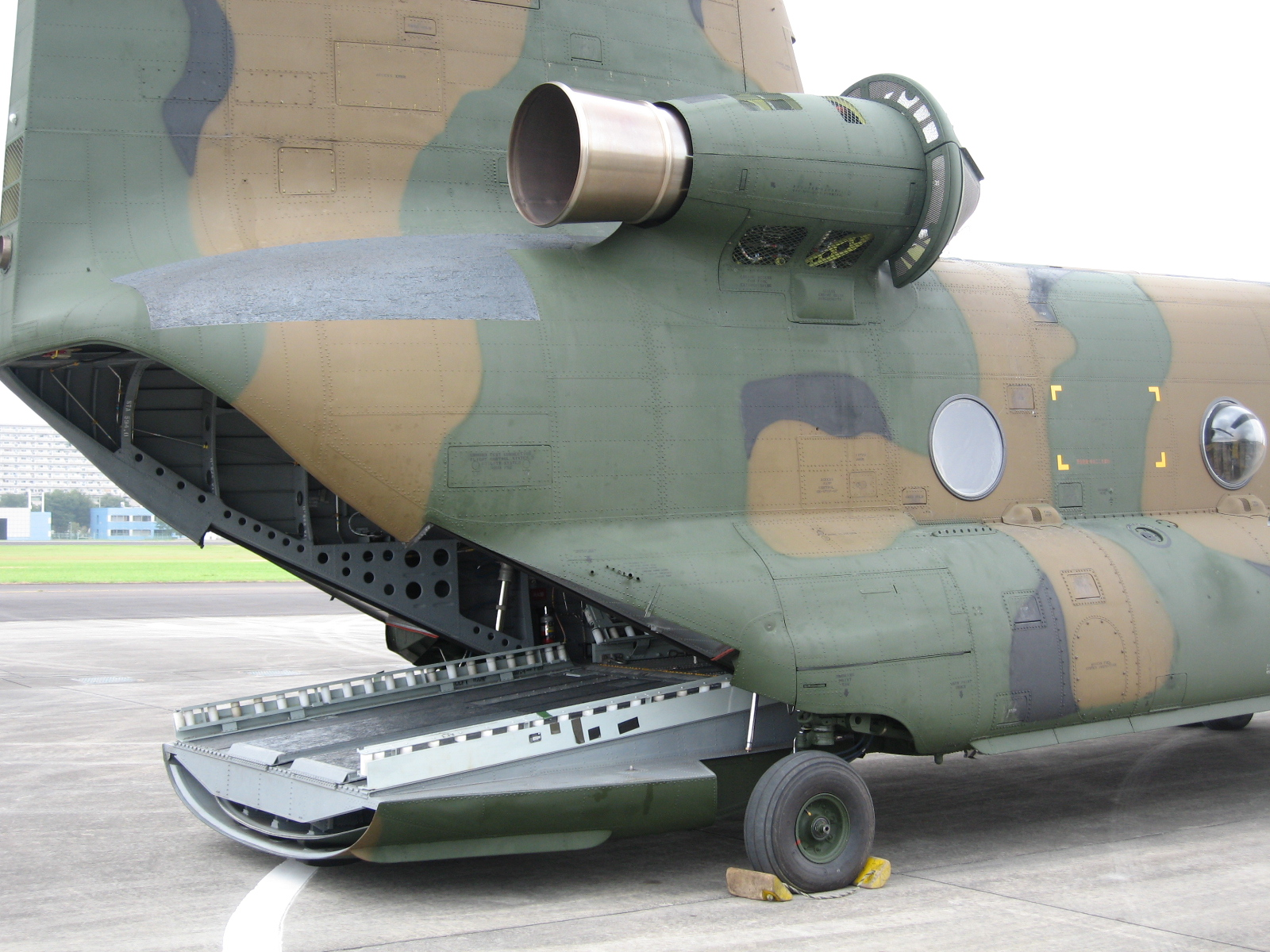
A Chinook with its rear ramp lowered

Improved and more powerful versions of the CH-47 have been developed since the helicopter entered service. Often, the same airframe was upgraded to later standards, or sometimes the airframes were built to the newer upgrade. The U.S. Army's first major design leap was the now-common CH-47D, which entered service in 1982. Improvements from the CH-47C included upgraded engines, composite rotor blades, a redesigned cockpit to reduce pilot workload, improved and redundant electrical systems, an advanced flight control system, and improved avionics. The latest (2009) mainstream generation is the CH-47F, which features several major upgrades to reduce maintenance, digitized flight controls, and is powered by two 4,733-horsepower (3,529 kW) Honeywell engines.

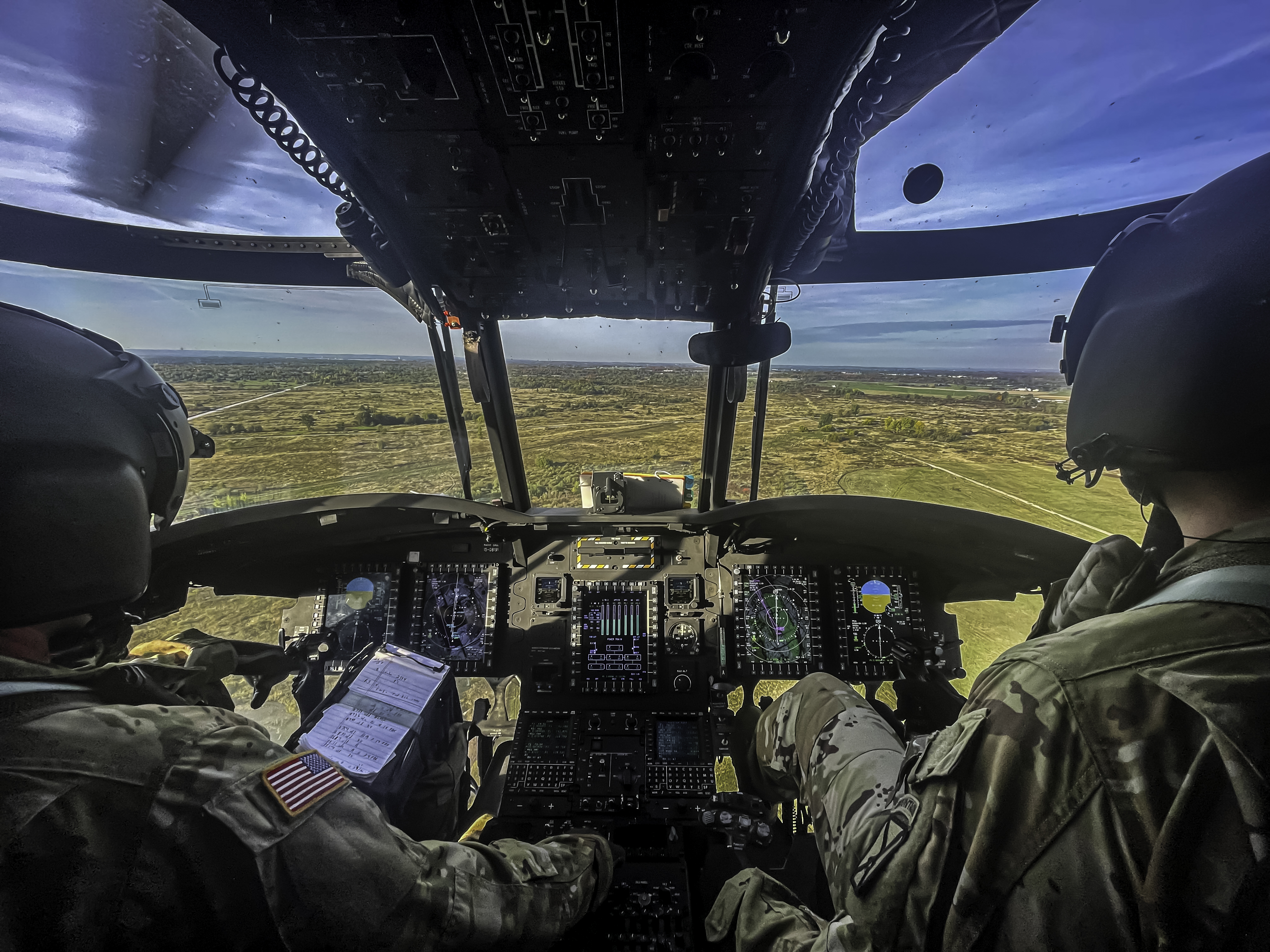
CH-47F cockpit view, 2022

An example of a British upgraded version is the HC.4, which first flew on 9 December 2010.

A commercial model of the Chinook, the Boeing-Vertol Model 234, is used worldwide for logging, construction, forest fire suppression, and petroleum-extraction operations. In December 2006, Columbia Helicopters Inc. purchased the type certificate of the Model 234 from Boeing. The Chinook has also been licensed to be built by companies outside the United States, such as Agusta (later AgustaWestland, now Leonardo) in Italy and Kawasaki in Japan.

=== CH-47F orders ===
In February 2007, the Royal Netherlands Air Force became the first international customer of the CH-47F model, expanding their Chinook fleet to 17. On 10 August 2009, Canada signed a contract for 15 extensively modified and upgraded CH-47Fs for the Canadian Forces, later delivered in 2013–2014 with the Canadian designation CH-147F. On 15 December 2009, Britain announced its Future Helicopter Strategy, including the purchase of 24 new CH-47Fs to be delivered from 2012. Australia ordered seven CH-47Fs in March 2010 to replace its six CH-47Ds between 2014 and 2017. In September 2015, India approved purchase of 15 CH-47F Chinooks. On 7 November 2016, Singapore announced that the CH-47F would replace its older Chinooks, which had been in service since 1994, enabling the Republic of Singapore Air Force to meet its requirements for various operations, including search-and-rescue, aeromedical evacuation, and humanitarian assistance and disaster relief operations. The German government announced in June 2022 that the CH-47F Block 2 was selected as the winner of its heavy helicopter program to replace its Sikorsky CH-53G Sea Stallion fleet. Germany is planning to buy sixty airframes to boost heavy lift capability.

Spain had 17 CH-47s, which it is planning to upgrade to CH-47F standards. By 2023, 13 CH-47Ds were upgraded to CH-47Fs, and additionally, four newly built CH-47Fs were acquired.

== Operational history ==
=== Vietnam War ===
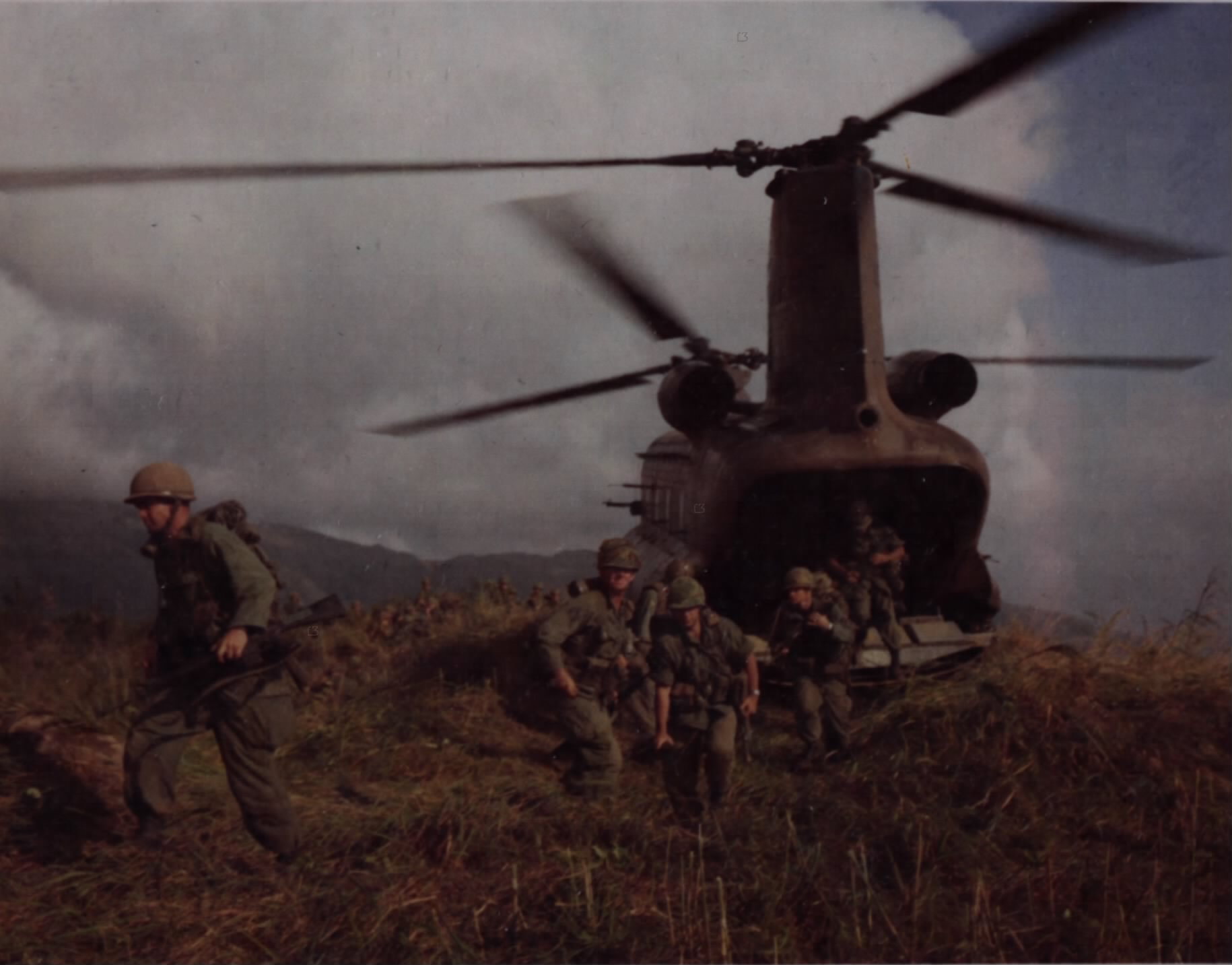
Soldiers depart a CH-47 during Operation Masher in 1966.

The Army finally settled on the larger Chinook as its standard medium-transport helicopter, and by February 1966, 161 aircraft had been delivered to the Army. The 1st Cavalry Division had brought its organic Chinook battalion (three Chinook companies) when it arrived in 1965 and a separate aviation medium helicopter company, the 147th, had arrived in Vietnam on 29 November 1965. This latter company was initially placed in direct support of the 1st Infantry Division. CH-47 crews quickly learned to mount an M60 machine gun in each of the forward doors. Sometimes, they also installed an M2 machine gun to fire from the rear cargo door.

The most spectacular mission in Vietnam for the Chinook was the placing of artillery batteries in perilous mountain positions inaccessible by any other means, and then keeping them resupplied with large quantities of ammunition. The 1st Cavalry Division found that its CH-47s were limited to a 7,000-pound (3,200 kg) payload when operating in the mountains, but could carry an additional 1,000 pounds (450 kg) when operating near the coast.

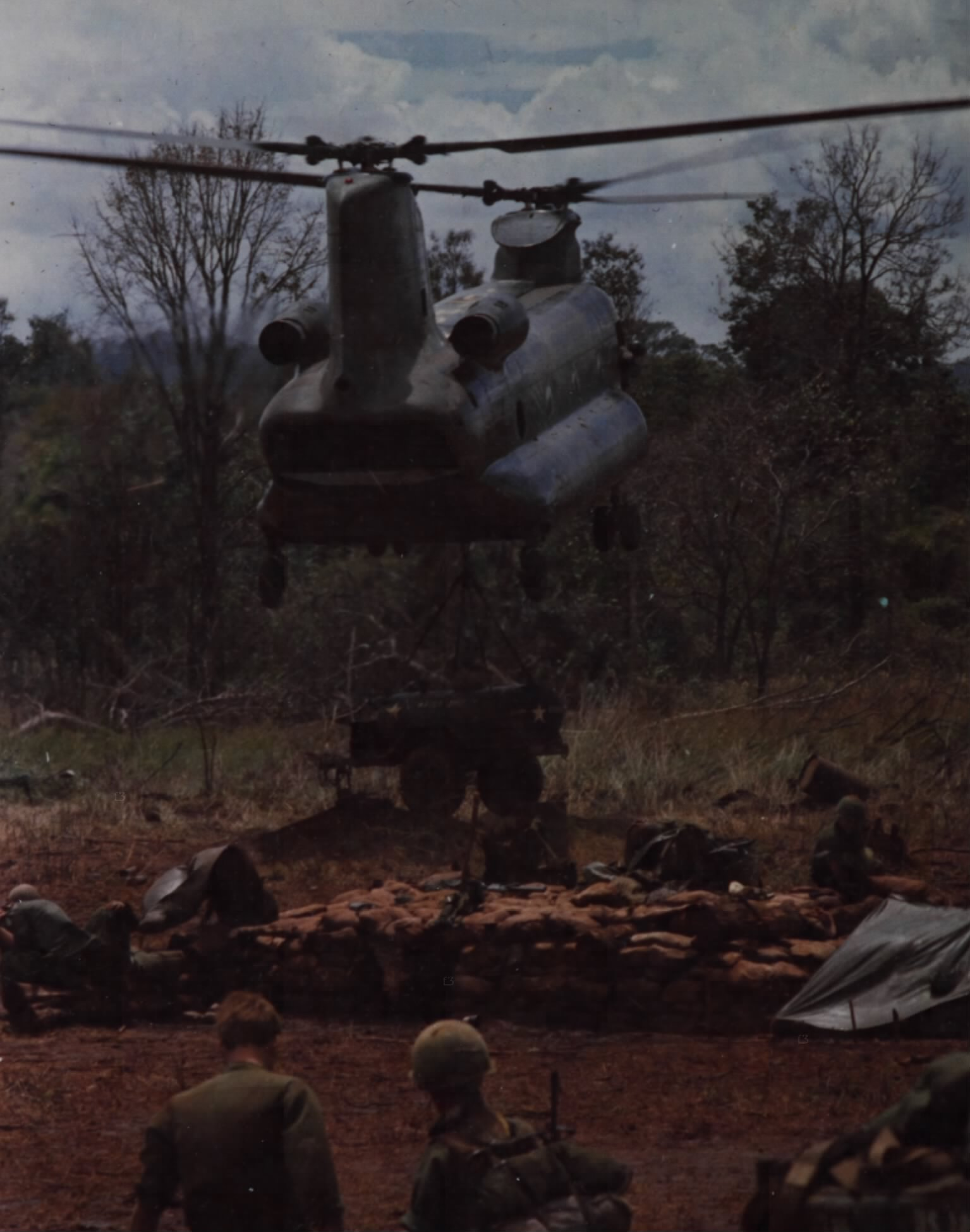
A CH-47A delivers a water trailer, 1967.

As with any new piece of equipment, the Chinook presented a major problem of "customer education". Commanders and crew chiefs had to be constantly alert that eager soldiers did not overload the temptingly large cargo compartment. Quite some time was needed before troops would be experts at using sling loads. The Chinook soon proved to be such an invaluable aircraft for artillery movement and heavy logistics that it was seldom used as an assault troop carrier. Some of the Chinook fleet was used for casualty evacuation, and due to the very heavy demand for the helicopters, they were usually overburdened with wounded. Perhaps the most cost effective use of the Chinook was the recovery of other downed aircraft.

At the war's peak, the US Army had 21 Chinook companies in Vietnam. Pilots discovered the CH-47A's transmission system could not handle the two gas turbines running at full power, and high humidity and heat reduced the maximum lift by more than 20% in the lowlands and 30% in mountain areas. More powerful, improved transmissions and strengthened fuselages arrived in 1968 with the CH-47B, followed a few months later by the CH-47C. The CH-47s in Vietnam were generally armed with a single 0.308 in (7.62 mm) M60 machine gun on a pintle mount on either side of the aircraft for self-defense, with stops fitted to keep the gunners from firing into the rotor blades. Dust filters were also added to improve engine reliability. Of the nearly 750 Chinook helicopters in the U.S. and South Vietnam fleets, about 200 were lost in combat or wartime operational accidents. The U.S. Army CH-47s supported the 1st Australian Task Force as required.

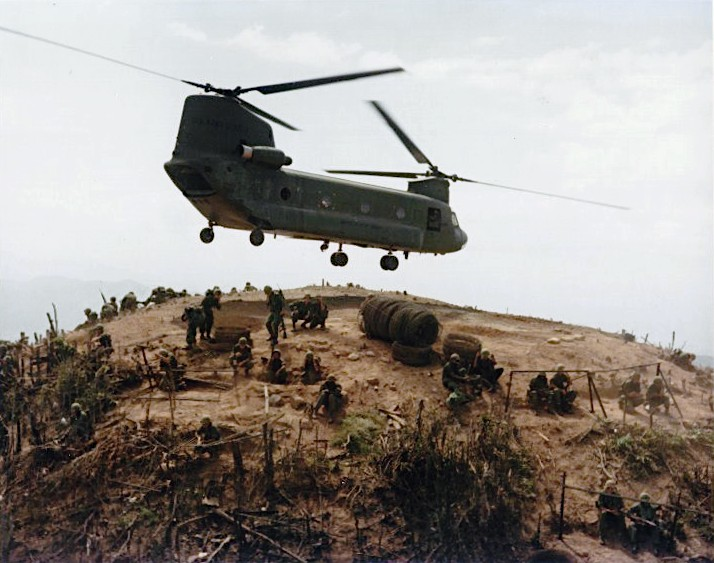
Troops unload from a CH-47 in the Cay Giep Mountains, Vietnam, 1967.

Four CH-47s were converted into ACH-47As by adding armor and improved engines. Its armament included two fixed, forward-firing M24A1 20 mm cannons, one turret with 40 mm automatic grenade launcher on the nose, five .50 in machine guns, and two weapon pods on the sides that could carry either XM159B/XM159C 70 mm rocket launchers or 7.62 mm miniguns. They arrived in Vietnam in 1966, and they engaged in six months of operational testing at An Khê Army Airfield. They performed well in combat, but their high maintenance costs and demand for use in troop and cargo transport was stronger. Three ACH-47s were lost. One collided with a CH-47 while taxiing. Another had a retention pin shake loose on a 20 mm cannon and was brought down when its own gun fired through the forward rotor blades. The third was grounded by enemy fire and destroyed by enemy mortar rounds after the crew escaped.

=== Iran ===
During the 1970s, the U.S. and Iran had a strong relationship, in which the Iranian armed forces began to use many American military aircraft, most notably the F-14 Tomcat, as part of a modernization program. After an agreement signed between Boeing and Agusta, the Imperial Iranian Air Force purchased 20 Agusta-built CH-47Cs in 1971. The Imperial Iranian Army Aviation purchased 70 CH-47Cs from Agusta between 1972 and 1976. In late 1978, Iran placed an order for an additional 50 helicopters with Elicotteri Meridionali, but that order was canceled immediately after the revolution; 11 of them were delivered after multiple requests by Iran.

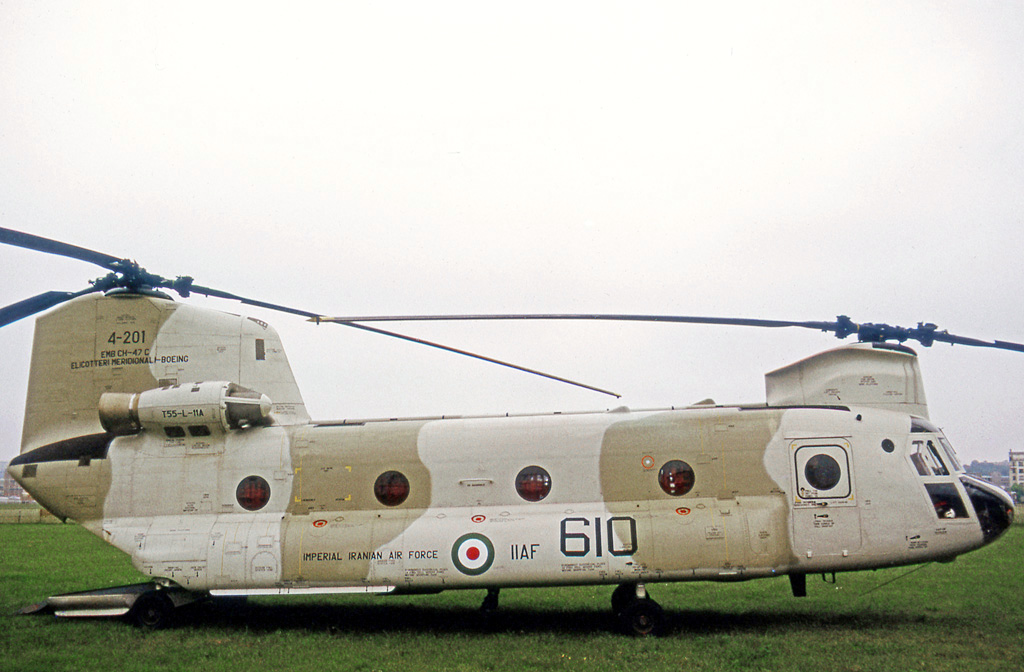
Imperial Iranian Air Force CH-47C in France before delivery in 1971

In the 1978 Iranian Chinook shootdown, four Iranian CH-47Cs penetrated 15–20 km (9–12 mi) into Soviet airspace in the Turkmenistan Military District. They were intercepted by a MiG-23M, which shot down one CH-47, killing eight crew members, and forced a second helicopter to land. Chinook helicopters were used in efforts by the Iranian against Kurdish rebels in 1979.

During the Iran–Iraq War, Iran made heavy use of its US-bought equipment, and lost at least eight CH-47s during the 1980–1988 period, most notably during a clash on 15 July 1983, when an Iraqi Mirage F1 destroyed three Iranian Chinooks transporting troops to the front line, and on 25–26 February 1984, when Iraqi MiG-21 fighters shot down two examples. On 22 March 1982, in Operation Fath ol-Mobin, a key operation of the war, Iranian Chinooks were landed behind Iraqi lines, deployed troops that silenced their artillery, and captured an Iraqi headquarters; the attack took the Iraqi forces by surprise.

Despite the arms embargo in place upon Iran, it has managed to keep its Chinook fleet operational. Some of the Chinooks have been rebuilt by Panha. As of 2015, 20 to 45 Chinooks were operational in Iran.

=== Libyan wars ===
In 1976, the Libyan Air Force purchased 24 Italian-built CH-47C helicopters, 14 of which were transferred to the Libyan Army during the 1990s. The Libyan Air Force recruited Western pilots and technicians to operate the CH-47 fleet. The Libyan Chinooks flew transport and support missions into Chad to supply Libyan ground forces operating there in the 1980s. Chinooks were occasionally used to transport Libyan special forces in assault missions in northern Chad.

In 2002, Libya sold 12 helicopters to the United Arab Emirates. The number of CH-47s still in existence or operational during the ongoing Libyan civil wars that started in 2011 is not known.

=== Falklands War ===
The Chinook was used both by Argentina and the United Kingdom during the Falklands War in 1982.

The Argentine Air Force and the Argentine Army each deployed two CH-47C helicopters, which were widely used in general transport duties. Of the Army's aircraft, one was destroyed on the ground by 30 mm cannon fire from an RAF GR3 Harrier, while the other was captured by the British and reused after the war. Both Argentine Air Force helicopters returned to Argentina and remained in service until 2002.

Three British Chinooks were destroyed on 25 May 1982 when Atlantic Conveyor was struck by an Exocet sea-skimming missile fired by an Argentine Super Étendard. The sole surviving British Chinook, Bravo November, did outstanding service in the Falklands, lifting 81 troops on one occasion. Since April 2022, it has been on display at Royal Air Force Museum Cosford.

=== Afghanistan and Iraq wars ===
About 163 CH-47Ds of various operators were deployed to Saudi Arabia, Kuwait, and Iraq during Operation Desert Shield and the subsequent Operation Desert Storm in 1990–91.

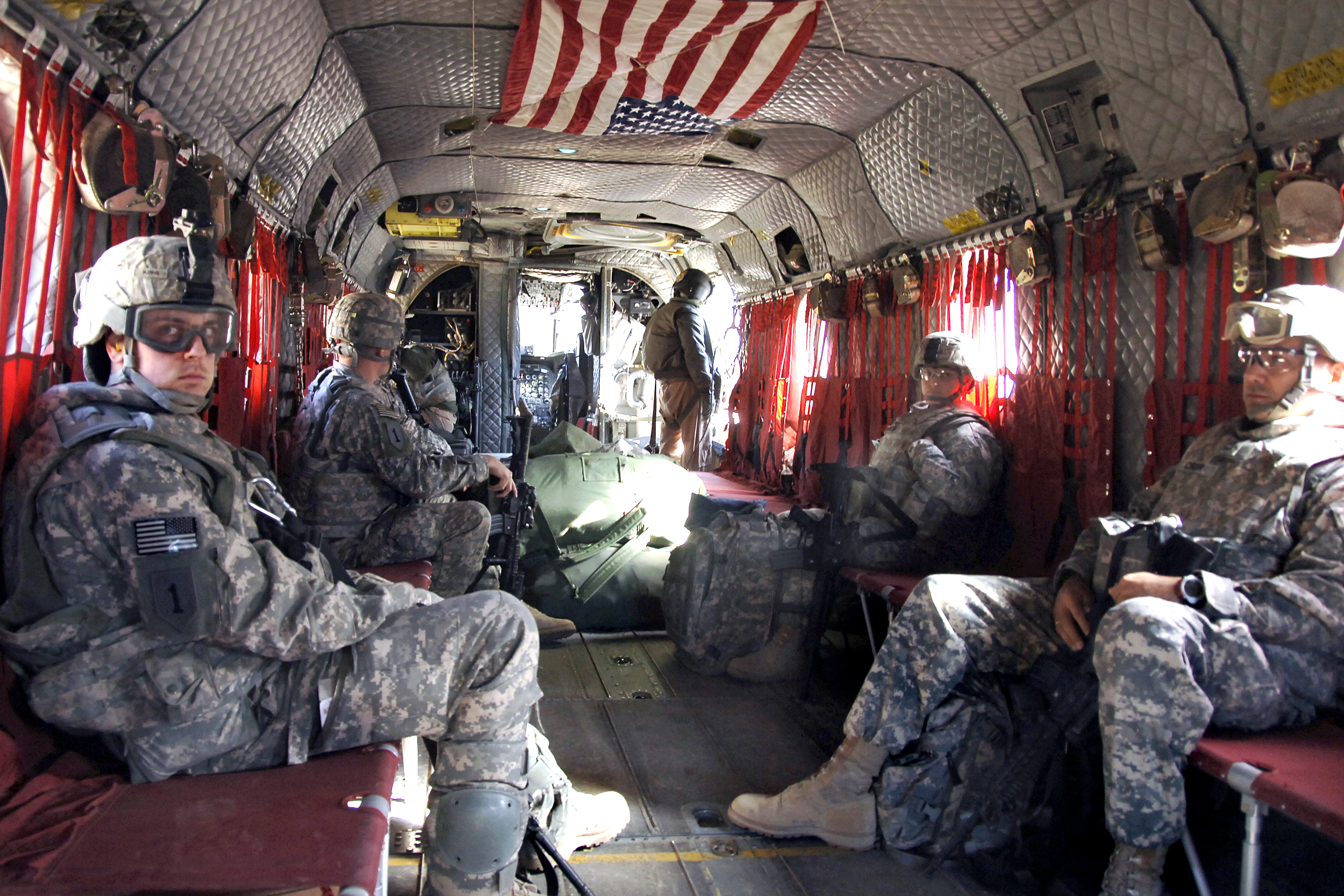
U.S. Army soldiers ride inside a Chinook, November 2008.

The CH-47D saw wide use in Operation Enduring Freedom in Afghanistan and Operation Iraqi Freedom in Iraq. The Chinook was used in air assault missions, inserting troops into fire bases, and later bringing food, water, and ammunition. It was also the casualty evacuation aircraft of choice in the British Armed Forces. In combat theaters, it is typically escorted by attack helicopters such as the AH-64 Apache for protection. Its lift capacity had been found of particular value in the mountainous terrain of Afghanistan, where high altitudes and temperatures limit the use of helicopters such as the UH-60 Black Hawk; reportedly, one Chinook could replace up to five UH-60s in the air assault transport role.

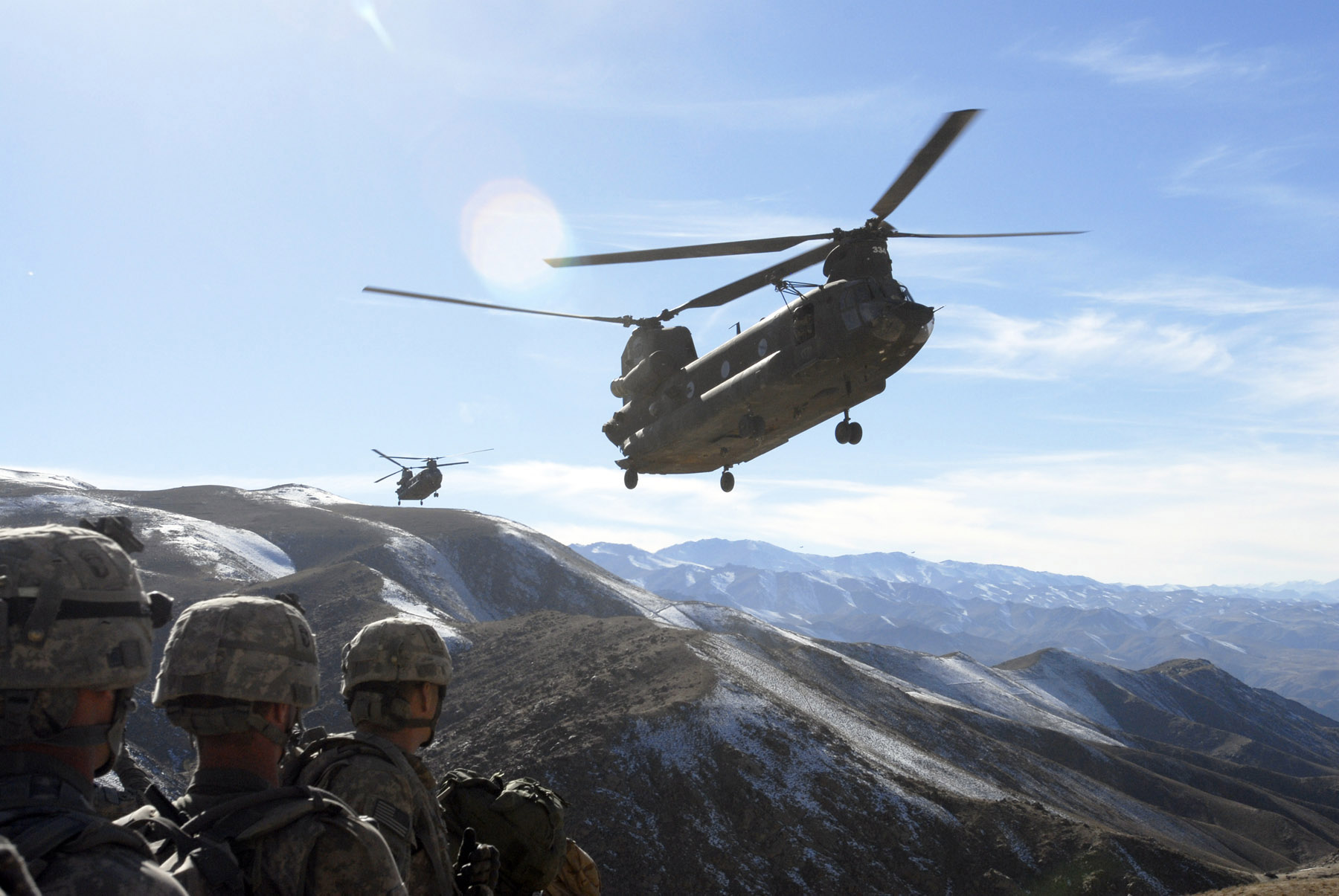
Soldiers wait for pickup by two CH-47s in Afghanistan, 2008

The Chinook helicopters of several nations have participated in the Afghanistan War, including aircraft from Britain, Italy, the Netherlands, Spain, Canada, and Australia. Despite the age of the Chinook, it was still in heavy demand, in part due its proven versatility and ability to operate in demanding environments such as Afghanistan.

In May 2011, an Australian Army CH-47D crashed during a resupply mission in Zabul Province, resulting in one fatality and five survivors. The helicopter was unable to be recovered and was destroyed in place. To compensate for the loss, the ADF added two ex-U.S. Army CH-47Ds to the fleet which are expected to be in service until the introduction of the CH-47Fs in 2016.

Chinook Helicopter over Kandahar air base

On 6 August 2011, a Chinook crashed near Kabul, killing all of the 38 aboard. The Chinook was reportedly shot down with a rocket-propelled grenade by the Taliban while attempting to assist a group of U.S. Navy SEALs. The 38 were members of NATO and allied forces, including 22 Naval Special Warfare operators, five U.S. Army Aviation soldiers, three U.S. Air Force special operations personnel, and seven Afghan National Army commandos. A civilian translator and a U.S. military working dog were also killed in the crash, which was the single deadliest during the entire Operation Enduring Freedom campaign. The previous biggest single-day loss for American forces in Afghanistan involved a Chinook that was shot down near Kabul in Kunar Province in June 2005 with all aboard killed, including a 16-member U.S. Special Operations team.

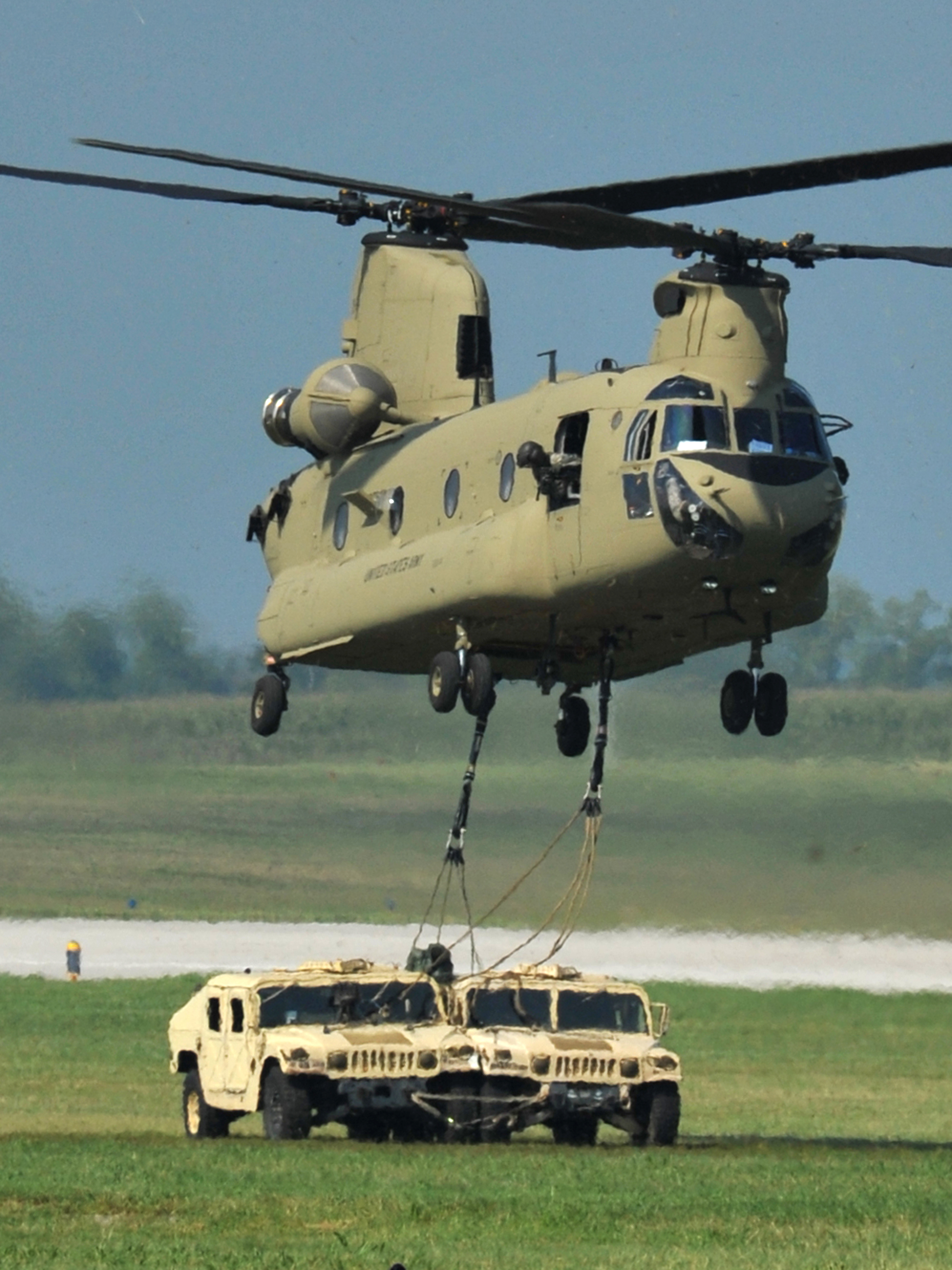
A Boeing CH-47 Chinook at Campbell Army Airfield on 7 August 2012 delivering two Humvees by sling load

Chinook helicopters participated in the 2021 Kabul airlift at the close of military operations in Afghanistan.

=== Disaster relief ===
The Chinook's ability to carry large, underslung loads has been of significant value in relief operations in the aftermath of natural disasters. Numerous operators have chosen to deploy their Chinook fleets to support humanitarian efforts in stricken nations overseas. Following the 2004 Asian tsunami, the Republic of Singapore Air Force assisted in the relief operations in neighboring Indonesia using its Chinooks; similarly, after the 2005 Kashmir earthquake, the Royal Air Force dispatched several Chinooks to northern Pakistan to assist in recovery efforts.

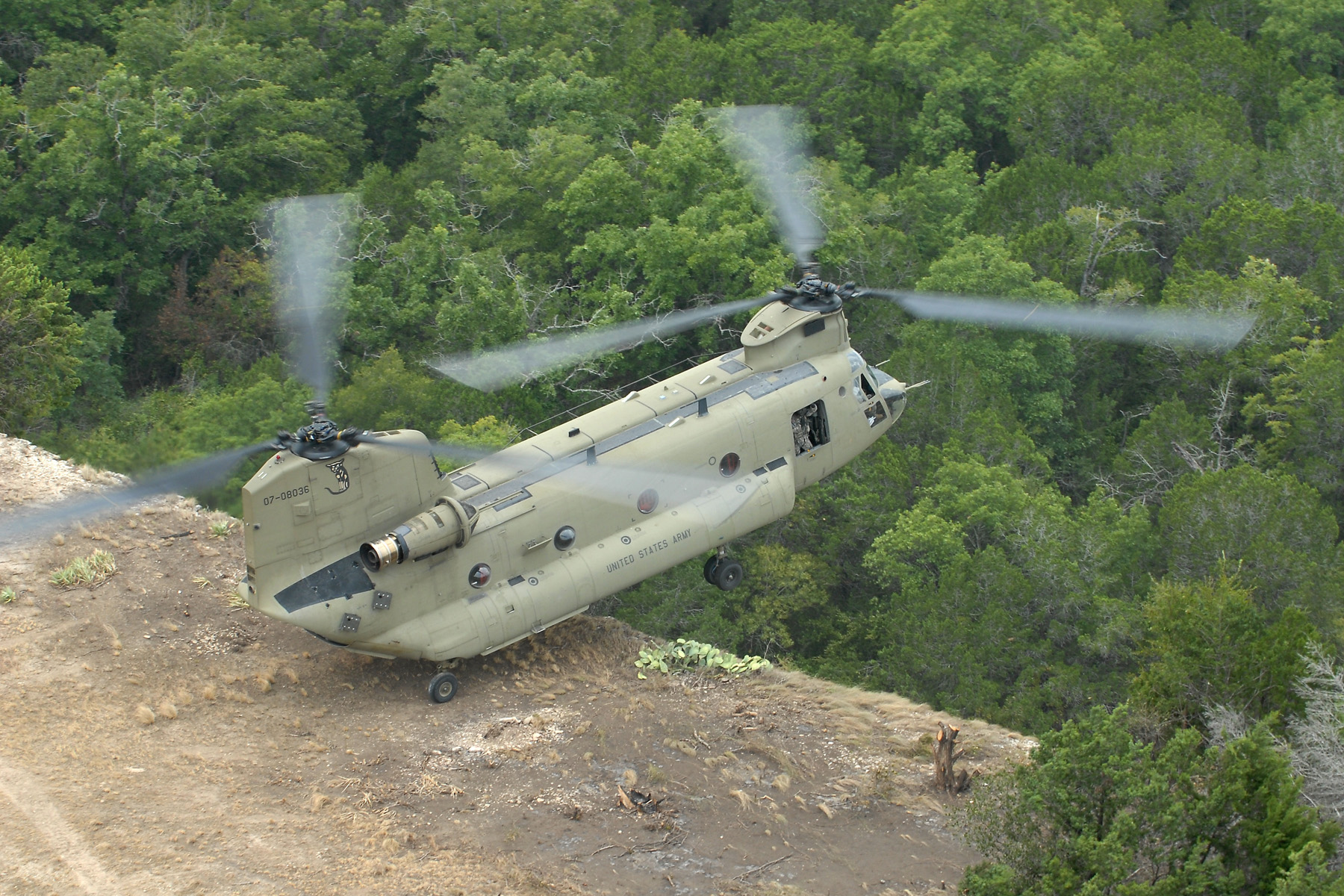
A CH-47F practicing the pinnacle maneuver whereby soldiers are deposited without the helicopter landing completely

In August 1992, six CH-47Ds were deployed from Fort Bragg in North Carolina to provide relief in the wake of Hurricane Andrew in what was one of the first major helicopter disaster relief operations on US soil. Then President George H. W. Bush ordered the military to assist. The Chinooks arrived at Miami-Opa Locka Executive Airport, just outside of the disaster zone, one day after the President's order; early on, they performed a wide loop over Homestead and Florida City to publicly display their presence, helping to curtail lawlessness and looting. The Chinooks initially flew 12 sorties per day out of Opa Locka, which expanded over time, often supporting distribution operations at Homestead AFB and Opa Locka, as well as delivering relief payloads via internal storage, not using sling loads, supplementing the 24 distribution centers and trucks, proving essential as trucks could not reach the worst-hit areas due to downed trees and power lines. They flew every day for about three weeks, moving supplies and personnel around the disaster zone and carrying media and government officials, including then-Congressman Bill Nelson. Ultimately, the Chinooks supplied 64 distribution sites throughout the zone and transported 1.2 million pounds of supplies before the urgent relief phase ended.

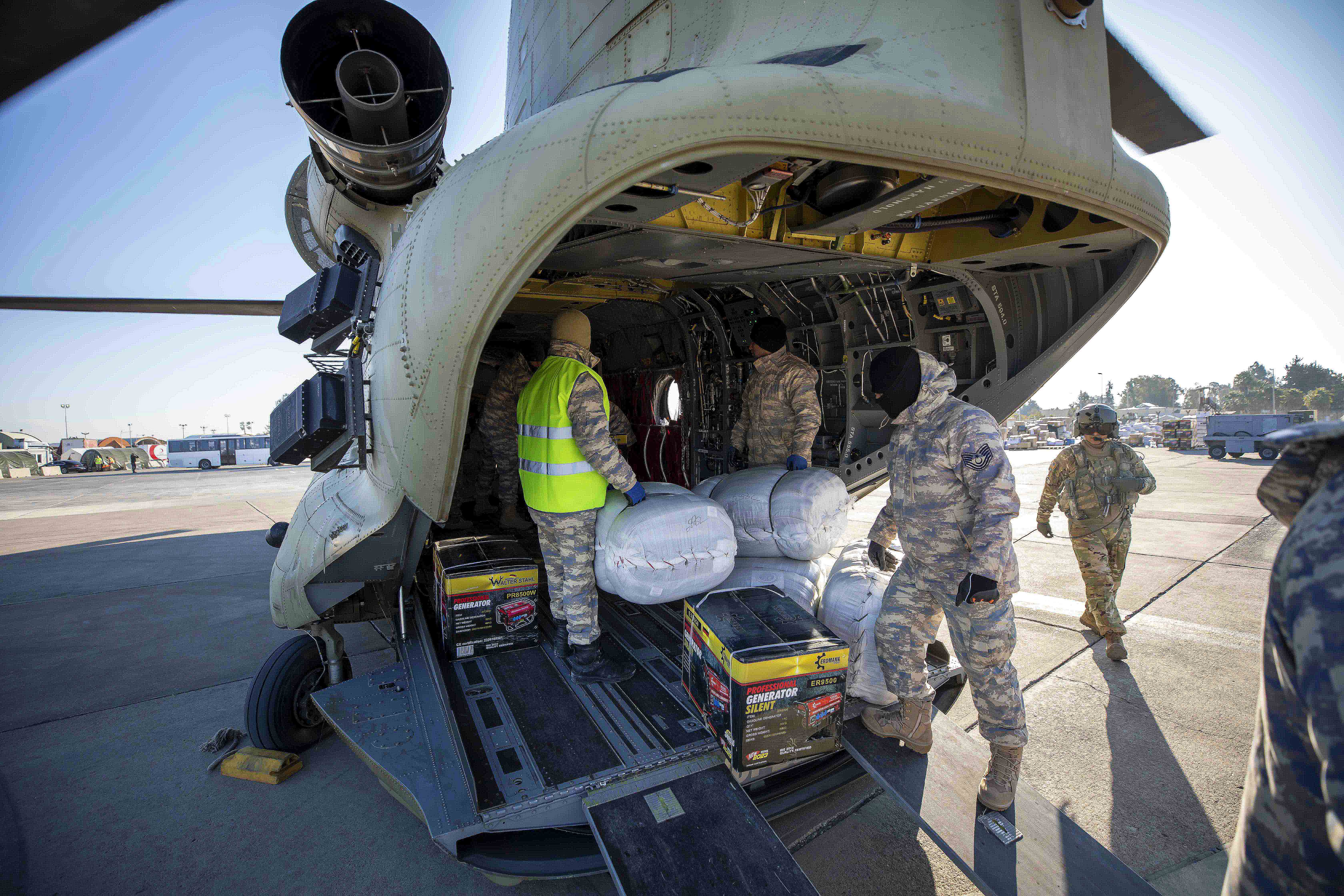
Humanitarian assistance being delivered by a Chinook after an earthquake

Three of Japan's CH-47s were used to cool Reactors 3 and 4 of the Fukushima nuclear power plant following the 9.0 earthquake in 2011; they were used to collect sea water from the nearby ocean and drop it over the affected areas. In order to protect the crew from the heightened radiation levels present, a number of lead plates were attached to the floor of each Chinook; even with such measures, pilots had to keep their distance from the reactors while also limiting flight times in the vicinity to a maximum of 45 minutes to avoid excessive radiation exposure.

In August 2025, the Indian Air Force, from its Northern Sector, deployed five of its Mi-17 helicopters along with a Chinook and C-130J transport aircraft each for the flood relief operations following the Uttarakhand and Kishtwar district flash floods. The C-130J aircraft boarded by an NDRF team reached Jammu to supply rescue materials, supplies and trained personnel. So far, 50 Army personnel, 21 Border Security Force (BSF) personnel and over 40 civilians have been rescued by the fleet from regions including Akhnoor, Pathankot and Dera Baba Nanak. Additionally, over 750 kg of relief materials were also air dropped into Pathankot as part of the operation. Additional helicopters and transport aircraft also remained on standby to join the operations if deemed necessary.

=== Other operations and roles ===
In April 2023, multiple Chinooks conducted the evacuation of the US Embassy in Khartoum, Sudan, with Special Forces. (see also Sudanese civil war (2023–present)) Chinooks have been deployed to Mali for MINUSMA.

Chinook helicopters were present over Caracas, Venezuela during a United States military operation beginning just after midnight on Jan 3, 2026.

Since the type's inception, the Chinook has carried out various secondary missions, including medical evacuation, disaster relief, search and rescue, aircraft recovery, firefighting, and heavy construction assistance.

In February 2020, the Indian Air Force started using Chinooks at theatres such as Ladakh and Siachen Glacier to assist Indian forces deployed at the Indian borders with China and Pakistan. The Indian Space Research Organisation has also enlisted Indian Air Force Chinooks during the development of its Reusable Launch Vehicle Technology Demonstration Program, with Chinook helicopters air-dropping a test vehicle 'Pushpak' during the RLV-LEX-01 ,RLV-LEX-02 and RLV-LEX-03 flight experiments conducted on April 2, 2023, March 22, 2024 and June 23, 2024, respectively. ISRO has also utilised IAF Chinooks for the Integrated Air drop tests for its Gaganyaan crew capsule over the Bay of Bengal, with two such missions in August 24, 2025 (IADT-01) and April 10, 2026 (IADT-02) respectively.

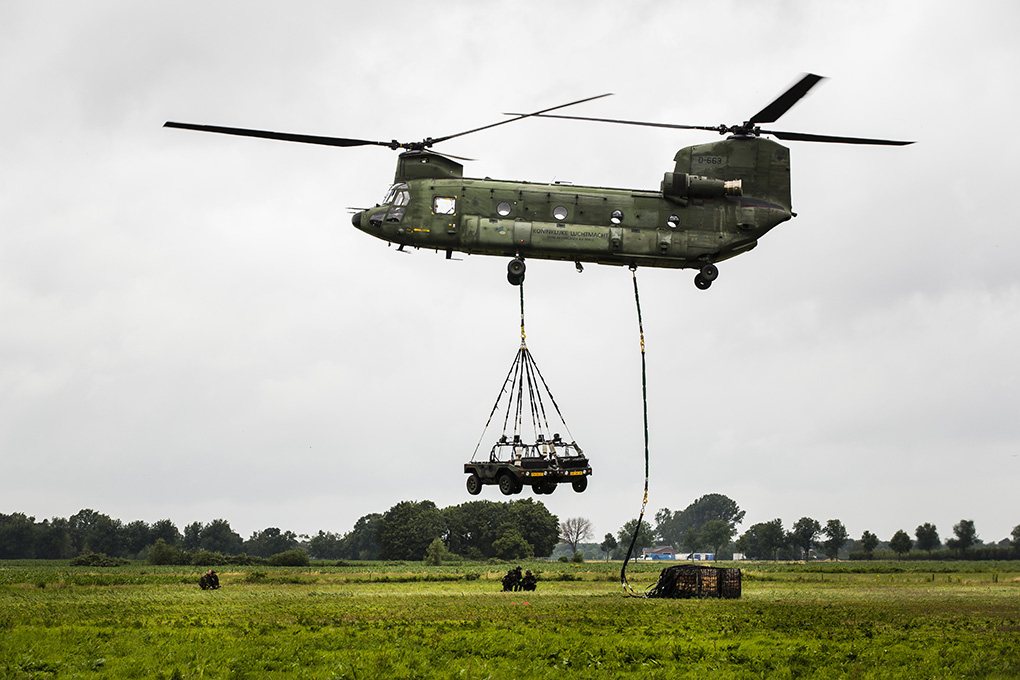
A Dutch CH-47D hauls slung light vehicles and another load on exercises, 2015.

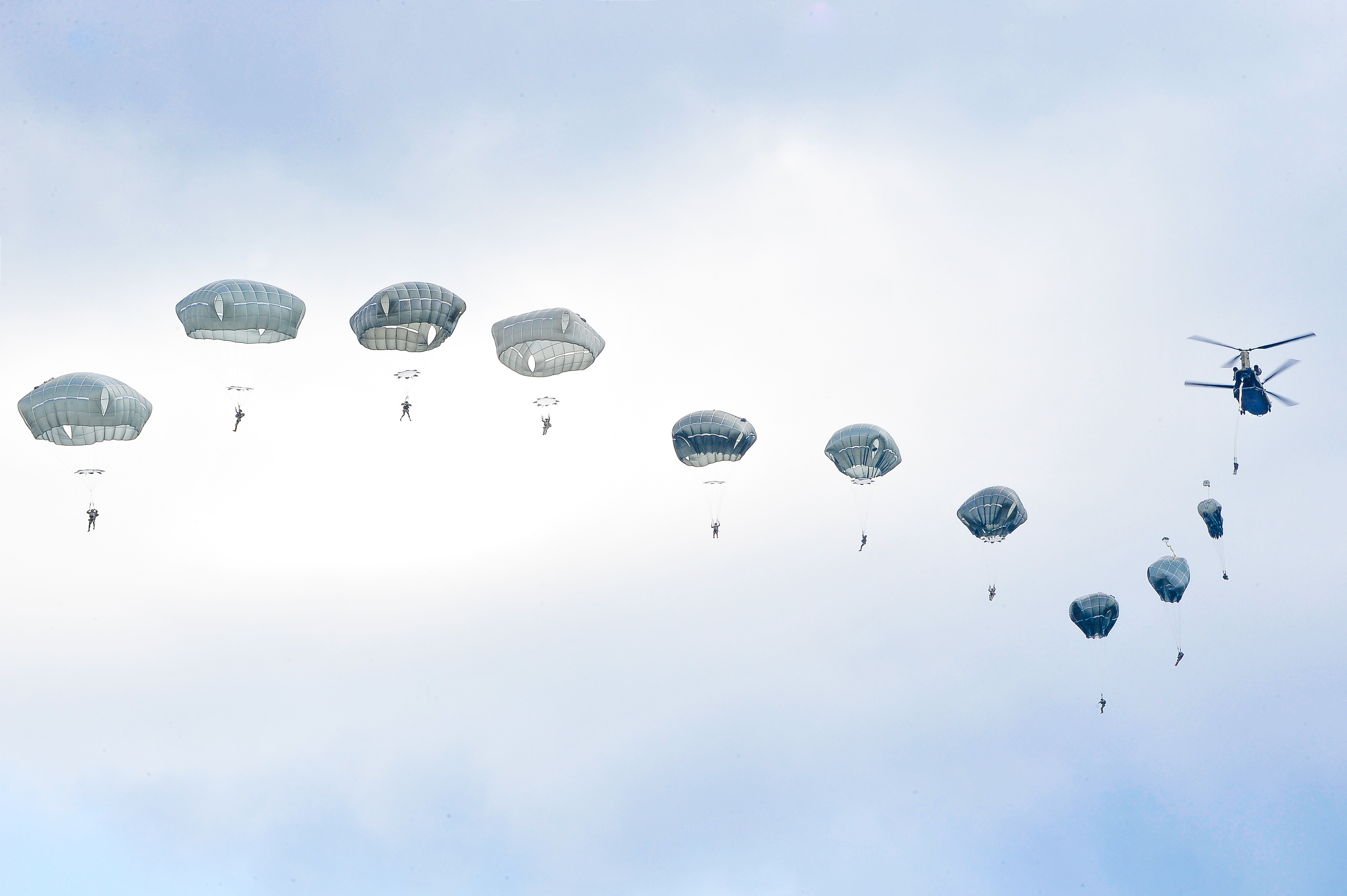
US parachutists jump from a Chinook over Germany in 2019.

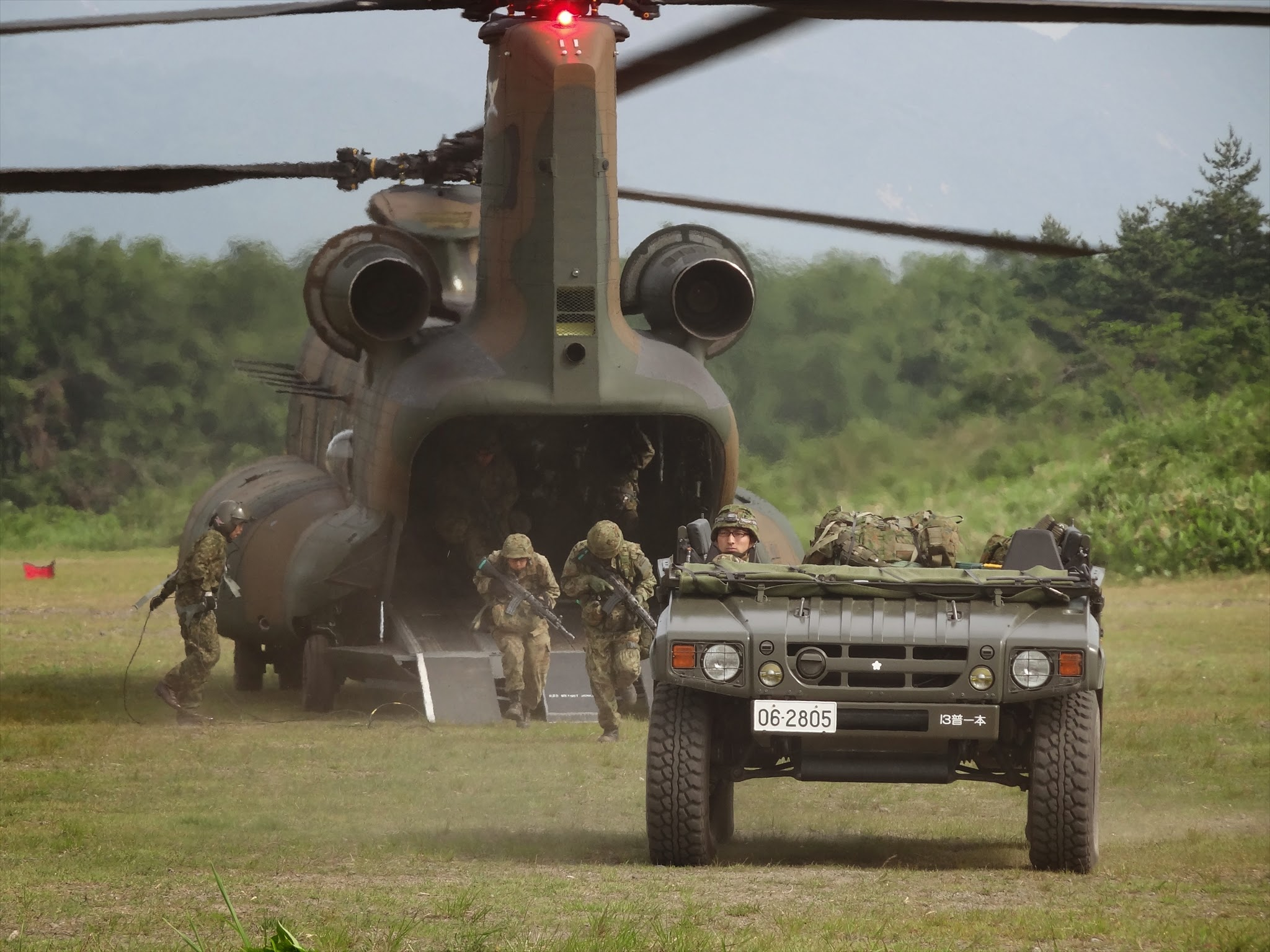
A Chinook on exercises in Japan

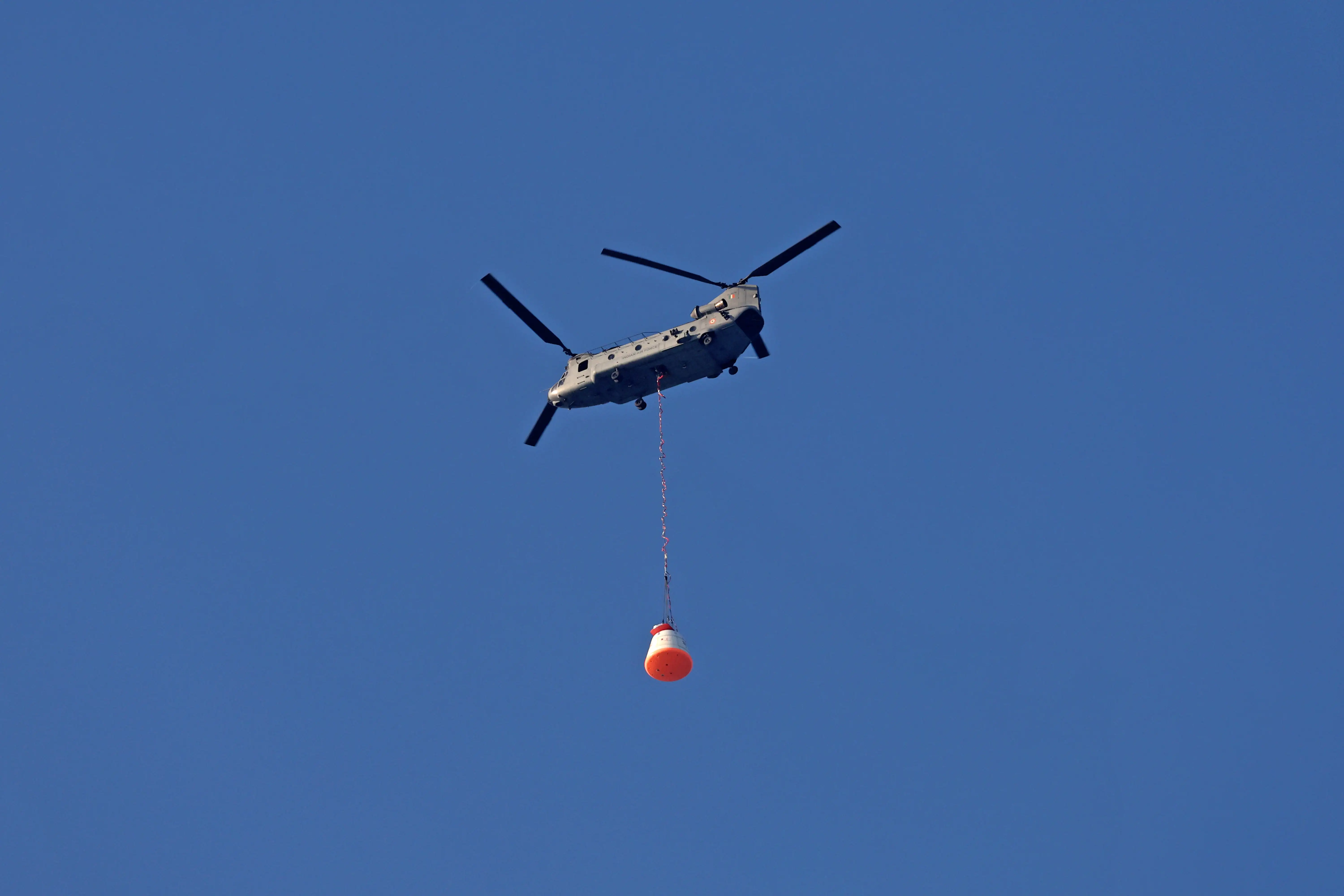
IAF Chinook drops an Gaganyaan Boilerplate

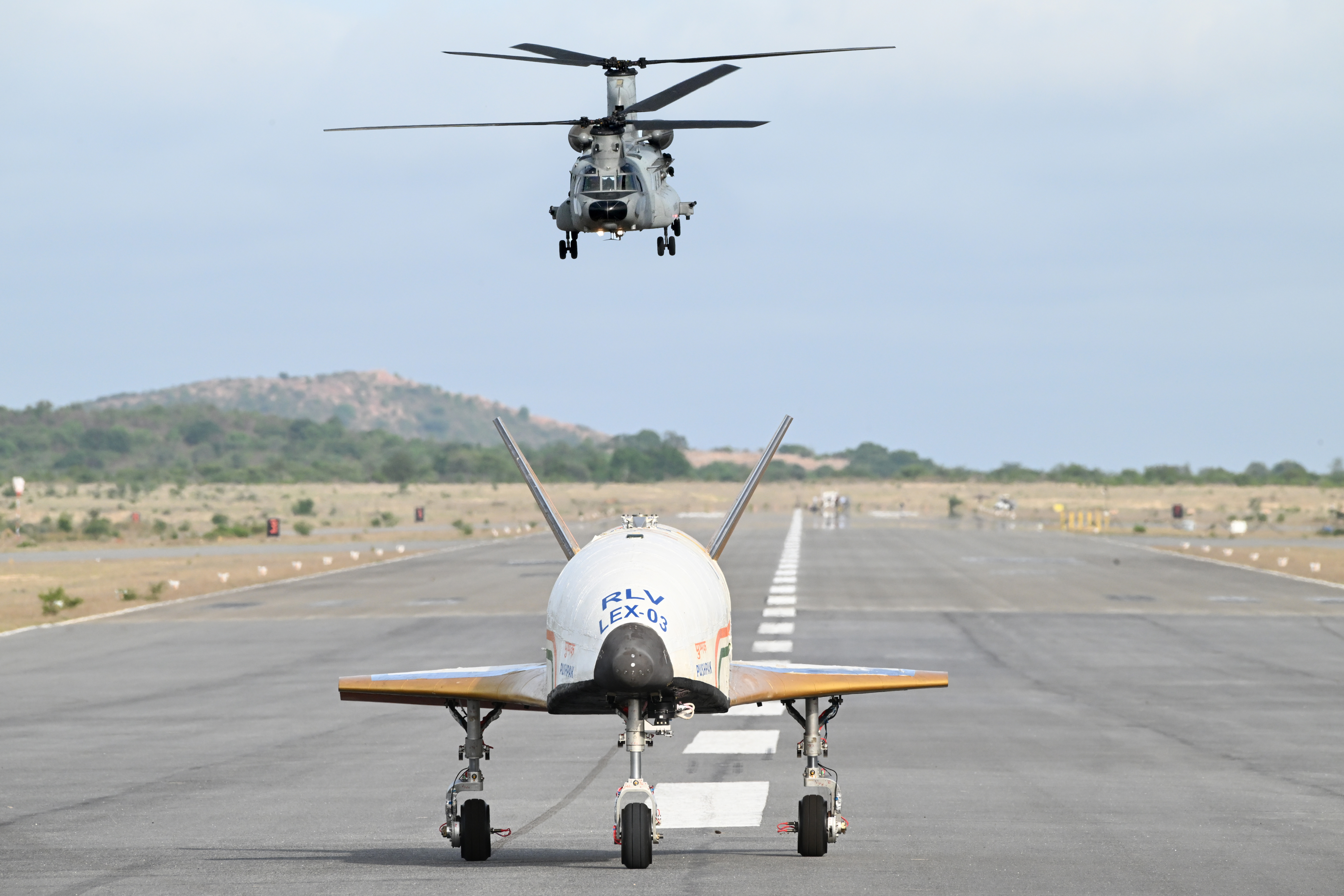
IAF Chinook with an ISRO RLV-TD spaceplane prototype.

== Variants ==
Many versions of the Chinook have been produced over the decades, including variants that involve major upgrades such as engines and avionics, ones for certain tasks, such as Special Operation missions, and finally for certain countries, such as the J model built by and for Japan.

=== HC-1B ===
The pre-1962 designation for Model 114 development aircraft that would be redesignated CH-47 Chinook.

=== CH-47A ===
The all-weather, medium-lift CH-47A Chinook was powered initially by Lycoming T55-L-5 engines rated at 2,200 horsepower (1,640 kW), which were replaced by the T55-L-7 rated at 2,650 hp (1,980 kW) engines or T55-L-7C engines rated at 2,850 hp (2,130 kW). The CH-47A had a maximum gross weight of 33,000 lb (15,000 kg), with a maximum payload about 10,000 lb (4,500 kg) Delivery of the CH-47A Chinook to the U.S. Army began in August 1962. A total of 354 were built.

=== ACH-47A ===
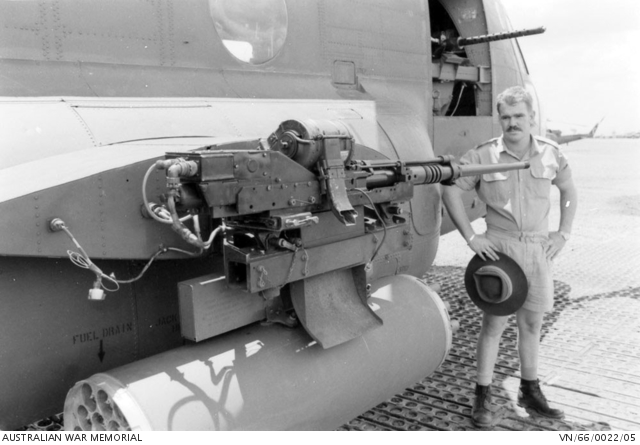
XM34 armament system on ACH-47A "Birth Control" at Vung Tau Air Base

The ACH-47A was known as the Armed/Armored CH-47A (or A/ACH-47A) before being designated ACH-47A as a U.S. Army Attack Cargo Helicopter, and unofficially referred to as "Guns A Go-Go". Four CH-47A helicopters were converted to gunships by Boeing Vertol in late 1965. Three were assigned to the 53rd Aviation Detachment in South Vietnam for testing, with the remaining one retained in the U.S. for weapons testing. By 1966, the 53rd was redesignated the 1st Aviation Detachment (Provisional) and attached to the 228th Assault Support Helicopter Battalion of the 1st Cavalry Division (Airmobile). One was lost to an accident while grounded, one to self-inflicted damage during a poor landing and one to enemy action, leaving only one by 1968. Since transport demands prevented more conversions, the survivor was returned to the United States, and the program stopped.

The ACH-47A carried five 7.62 × 51 mm M60D machine guns or .50-caliber (12.7 mm) M2HB heavy machine guns, provided by the XM32 and XM33 armament subsystems, two 20 mm M24A1 cannons, two 19-tube 2.75-inch (70 mm) Folding Fin Aerial Rocket launchers (XM159B/XM159) or sometimes two M18/M18A1 7.62 × 51 mm gun pods, and a single 40 mm M75 grenade launcher in the XM5/M5 armament subsystem (more commonly seen on the UH-1 series of helicopters). Rare newsreel footage shows one of the aircraft in action supporting the 8th Cavalry Regiment during an ambush at Bông Son, South Vietnam. The surviving aircraft, Easy Money, has been restored and is on display at Redstone Arsenal, Alabama.

=== CH-47B ===
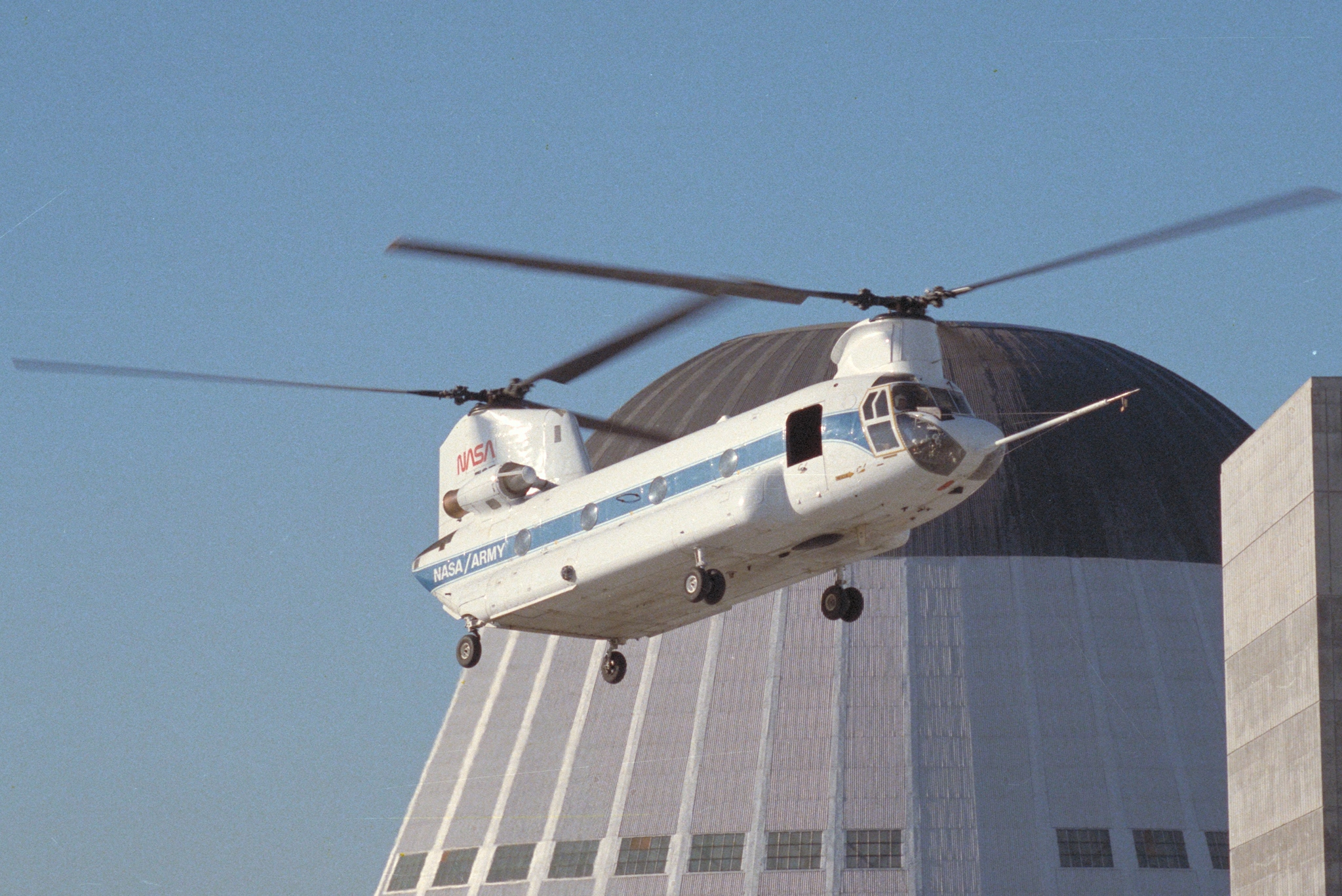
NASA CH-47B

The CH-47B was an interim upgrade while Boeing worked on a more substantially improved CH-47C. The CH-47B was powered by two Lycoming T55-L-7C 2,850 hp (2,130 kW) engines. It had a blunted rear rotor pylon, redesigned asymmetrical rotor blades, and strakes along the rear ramp and fuselage to improve flying characteristics. It could be equipped with two door-mounted M60D 7.62 mm NATO machine guns on the M24 armament subsystem and a ramp-mounted M60D using the M41 armament subsystem. Some CH-47 "bombers" were equipped to drop tear gas or napalm from the rear cargo ramp onto Viet Cong bunkers. The CH-47B could be equipped with a hoist and cargo hook. The Chinook proved especially valuable in "Pipe Smoke" aircraft recovery missions. The "Hook" recovered about 12,000 aircraft valued at over $3.6 billion during the war; 108 were built.

=== CH-47C ===
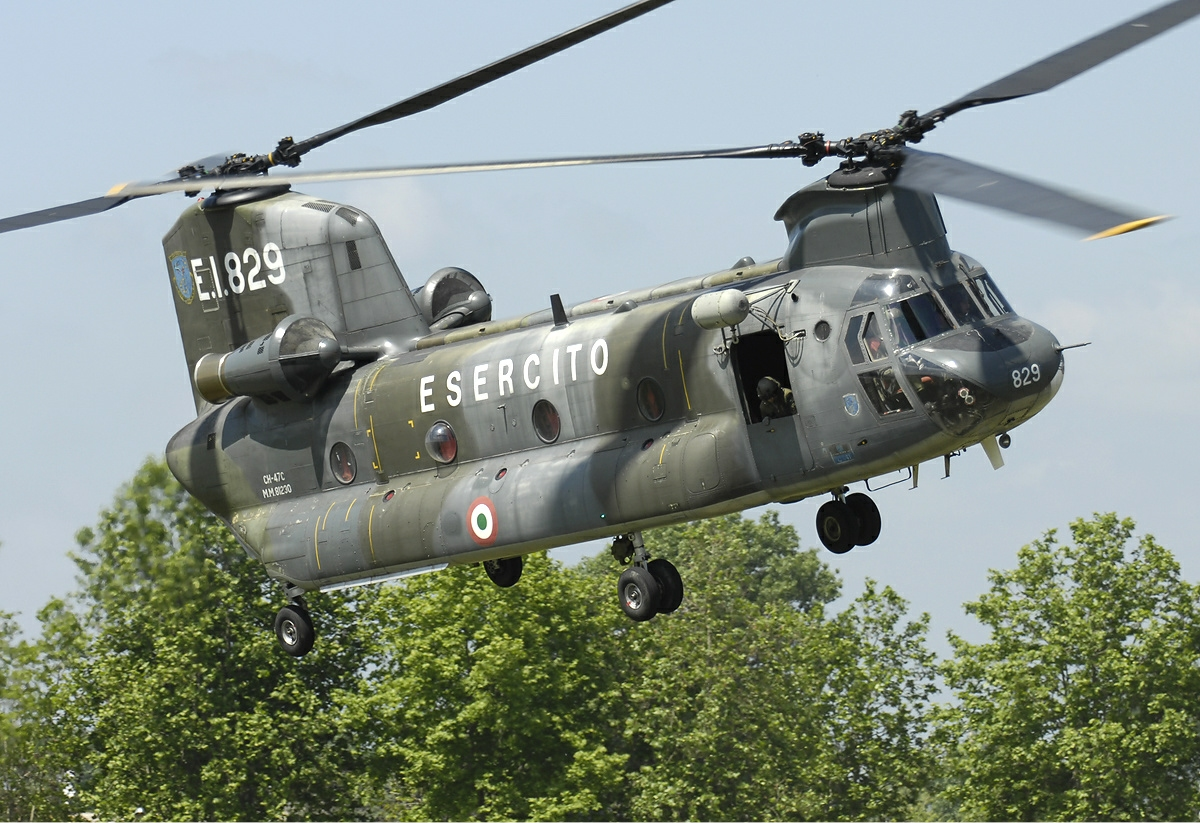
CH-47C of the Italian Army

The CH-47C featured more powerful engines and transmissions. Three sub-versions were built, the first with Lycoming T55-L-7C engines delivering 2,850 shp (2,130 kW). The "Super C" had Lycoming T55-L-11 engines delivering 3,750 shp (2,800 kW), an upgraded maximum gross weight of 46,000 lb (21,000 kg), and pitch stability augmentation. The T55-L-11 engines were less reliable, as they had been hurriedly introduced to increase payload; thus, they were temporarily replaced by the more reliable Lycoming T55-L-7C. The Super C was distinguishable from the standard "C" by the uprated maximum gross weight.

The type was not approved by the FAA for civil aviation due to the nonredundant hydraulic flight boost system drive. The hydraulic system was redesigned for the succeeding CH-47D, allowing it to achieve certification as the Boeing Model 234. A total of 233 CH-47Cs were built. Canada bought eight CH-47Cs; deliveries of the type began in 1974. Receiving the Canadian designation "CH-147C", these were fitted with a power hoist above the crew door; other changes included a flight engineer station in the rear cabin: operators referred to the configuration as the "Super C". The CH-47C was used widely during the Vietnam War, eventually replacing the older Piasecki H-21 Shawnee in the combat assault support role.

=== CH-47D ===
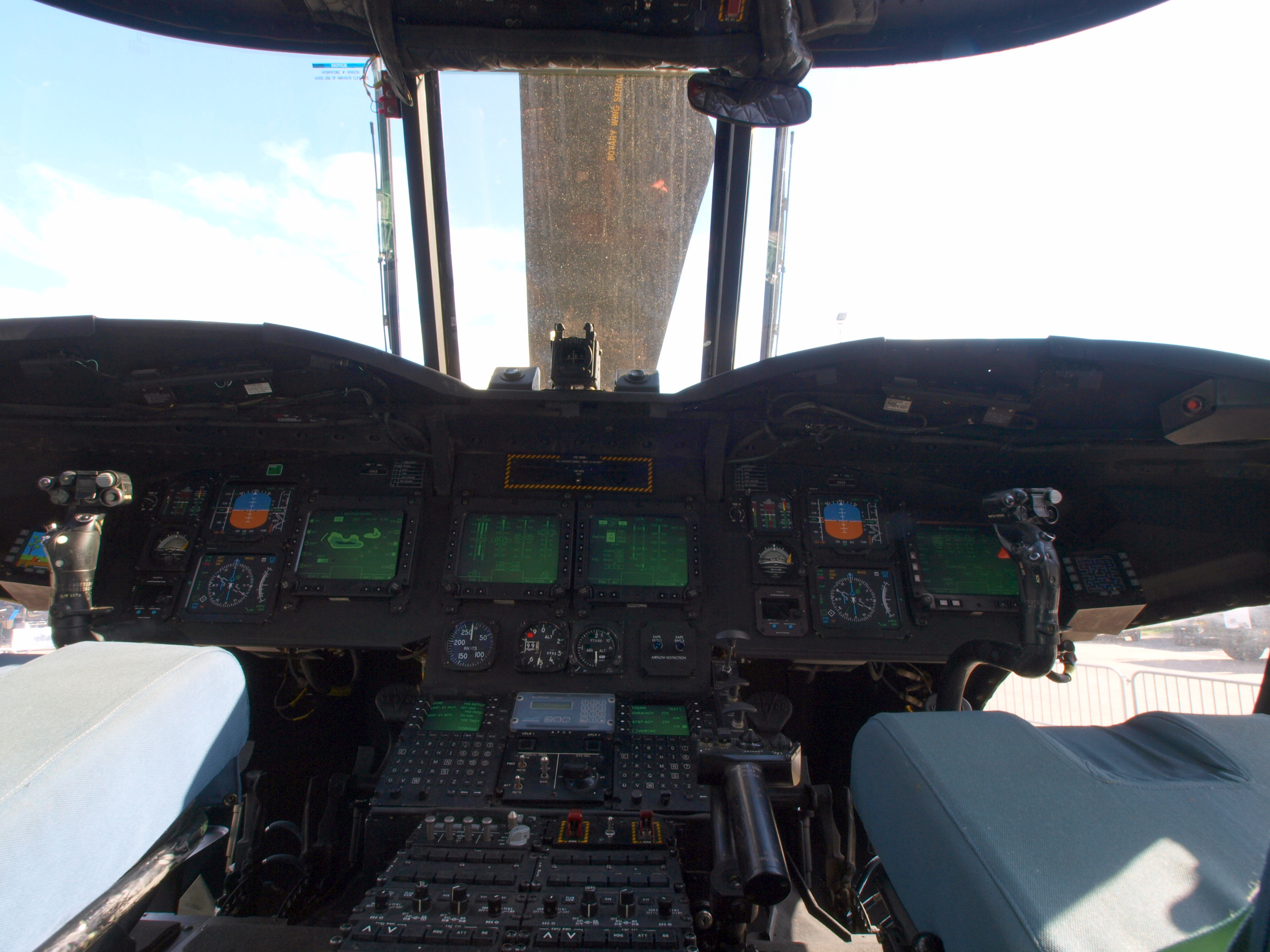
CH-47D cockpit

The CH-47D shares the same airframe as earlier models, with more powerful engines. Early CH-47Ds were powered by two T55-L-712 engines. The most common engine is the later T55-GA-714A. With its triple-hook cargo system, the CH-47D can carry heavy payloads internally and up to 26,000 lb (12,000 kg) (such as 40-foot or 12-meter containers) externally. It was introduced into service in 1979. In air assault operations, it often serves as the principal mover of the 155 mm M198 howitzer, plus 30 rounds of ammunition, and an 11-man crew. The CH-47D has advanced avionics, including Global Positioning System. Nearly all US Army CH-47Ds were converted from previous A, B, and C models, a total of 472 being converted. The last U.S. Army CH-47D built was delivered to the U.S. Army Reserve, located at Fort Hood, Texas, in 2002.

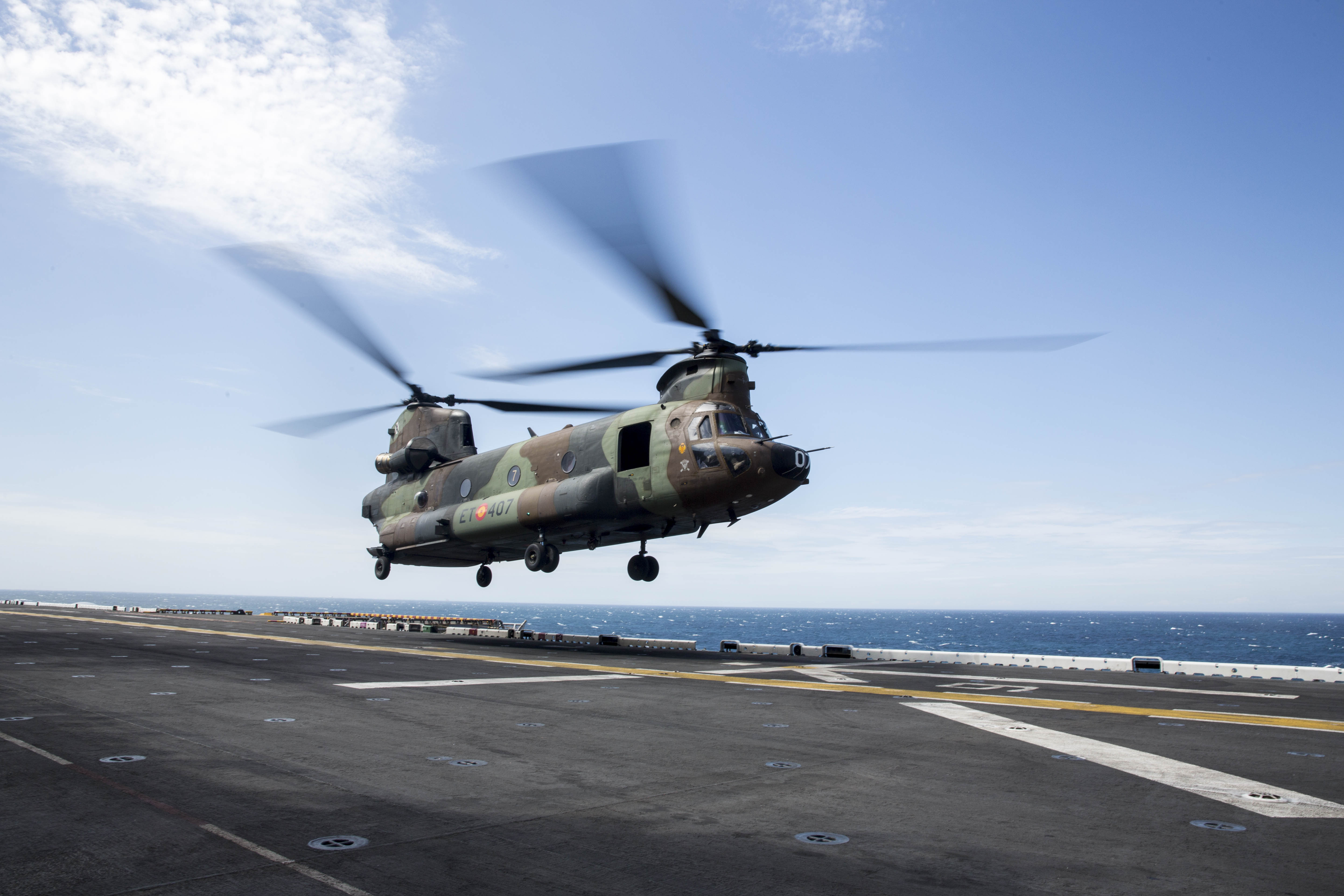
CH-47D of the Spanish Army taking off from the USS Kearsarge, 2016

In 1993, the Netherlands signed an agreement with Canada to acquire seven CH-147Cs that were no longer in use with the RCAF. These airframes where upgraded by Boeing to CH-47D standard and delivery took place between August 1995 and February 1996. Six more new CH-47Ds were delivered by Boeing in 1998 for a total of 13, of which two where lost in 2005 while on duty in Afghanistan. The Dutch CH-47Ds are improved over U.S. Army CH-47Ds, including a long nose for a Bendix weather radar, a "glass cockpit", and improved T55-L-714 engines. Between 2015 and 2023, the Netherlands replaced all 11 remaining CH-47Ds with 14 newly built CH-47Fs. The six CH-47Fs that where already in service have been upgraded to the same "MYII CAAS" standard as the newly built helicopters.

As of 2011, Singapore has 18 CH-47D/SDs, which includes twelve "Super D" Chinooks, in service.

In 2008, Canada purchased 6 CH-47Ds from the U.S. for the Canadian Helicopter Force Afghanistan for $252 million. With 1 CH-47D lost to an accident, the remaining five were sold in 2011 after the end of Canada's Afghanistan mission and replaced with seven CH-147Fs.

The U.S. Army is surplusing many of its CH-47Ds for use in FAA restricted category.

=== MH-47D ===
The MH-47D was developed for special forces operations and has inflight refueling capability, a fast rope-rappelling system, and other upgrades. The MH-47D was used by U.S. Army 160th Special Operations Aviation Regiment. Twelve MH-47D helicopters were produced. Six were converted from CH-47As and six were converted from CH-47C models.

=== MH-47E ===
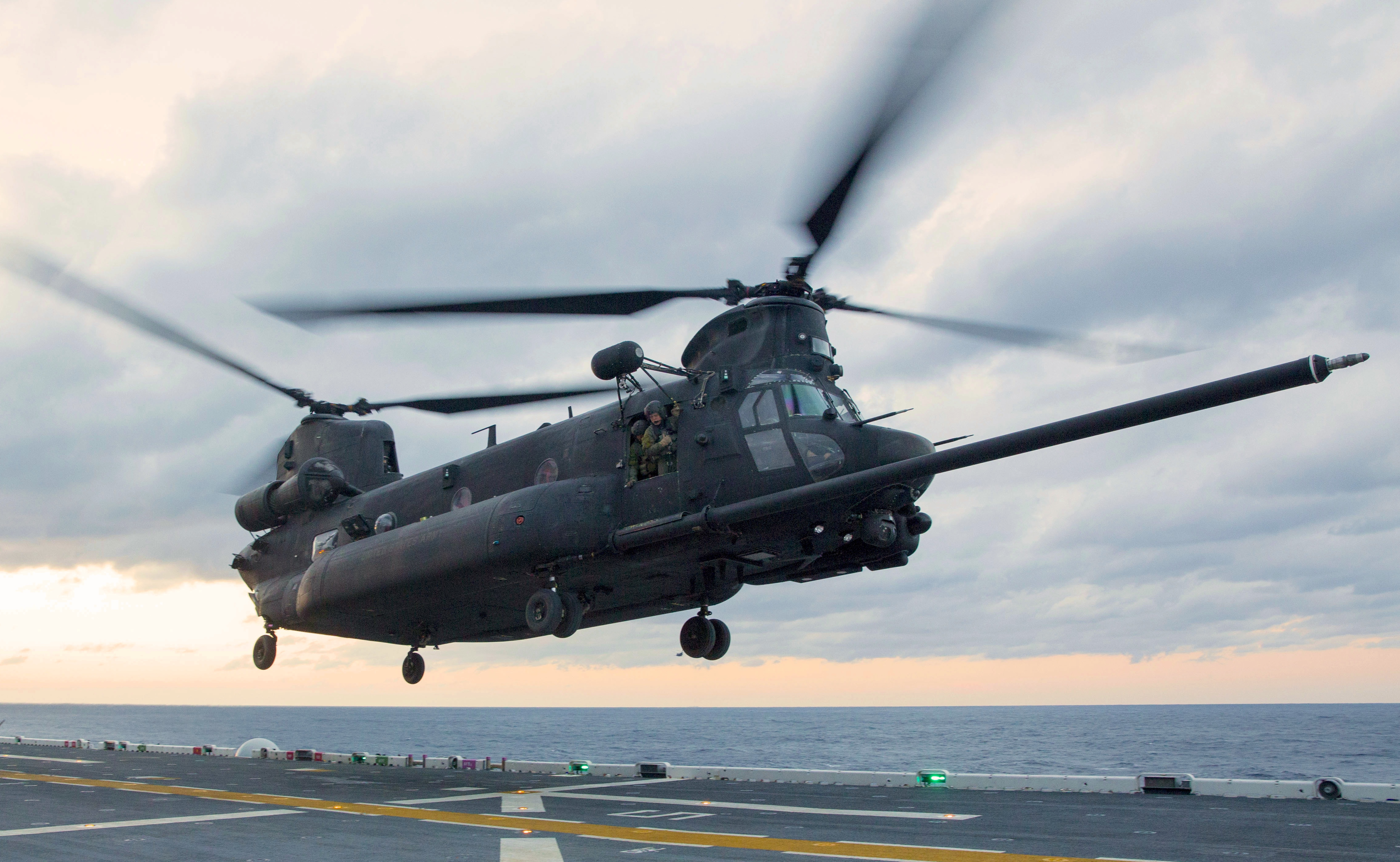
A US Army MH-47E Chinook with in-flight refuelling probe lands aboard USS Kearsarge.

The MH-47E has been used by U.S. Army Special Operations. Beginning with the E-model prototype manufactured in 1991, a total of 26 Special Operations Aircraft were produced. All aircraft were assigned to 2–160th SOAR(A) "Nightstalkers", home based at Fort Campbell, Kentucky. E models were converted from CH-47C airframes. The MH-47E has similar capabilities as the MH-47D, but with increased fuel capacity similar to the CH-47SD and terrain following/terrain avoidance radar.

In 1995, the Royal Air Force ordered eight Chinook HC3s, effectively a lower cost MH-47E for special operations. They were delivered in 2001, but never became operational due to technical issues with their avionics fit, unique to the HC3. In 2008, work started to revert the HC3s to HC2 standard, to enable them to enter service. As of 2017 they were upgraded to HC5 standard with a digital automated flight control system.

=== CH-47F ===
CH-47F during the exercise Southern Accord 2012

In 2001, the CH-47F, an upgraded CH-47D, made its maiden flight. The first production model rolled out at Boeing's facility in Ridley Park, Pennsylvania, and first flew on 23 October 2006. Upgrades included 4,868-shaft-horsepower (3,630 kW) Honeywell engines and airframe with better integrated construction for lower maintenance requirements. The milled construction reduces vibration, as well as inspection and repair needs, and eliminates flexing points to increase service life. The CH-47F can fly at speeds of over 175 mph (282 km/h) with a payload of more than 21,000 lb (9,500 kg). New avionics include a Rockwell Collins Common Avionics Architecture System (CAAS) cockpit, and BAE Systems' Digital Advanced Flight Control System (DAFCS). AgustaWestland assembles the CH-47F under license, known as the Chinook ICH-47F, for several customers. Boeing delivered 48 CH-47Fs to the U.S. Army through August 2008; at that time Boeing announced a $4.8 billion (~$7.04 billion in 2025) contract with the Army for 191 Chinooks.

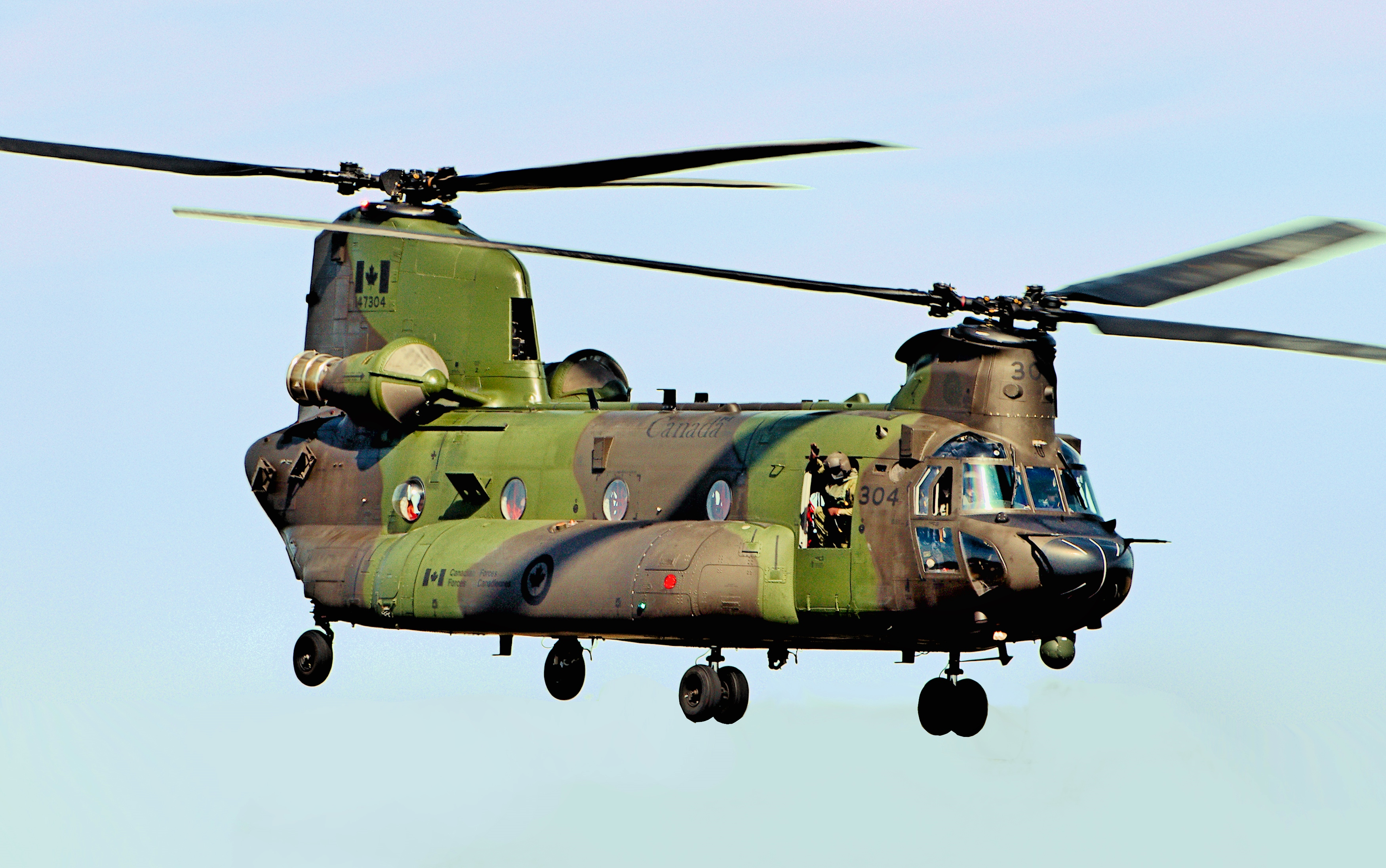
A Canadian CH-147F at RIAT 2017

A CH-47F Block 2 is being implemented as of 2020. The Block 2 aims for a payload of 22,000 lb (10,000 kg) with 4,000 ft (1,200 m) and 95 °F (35 °C) high and hot hover performance, eventually increased up to 6,000 ft (1,800 m), to carry the Joint Light Tactical Vehicle; maximum takeoff weight would be raised to 54,000 lb (24,500 kg). It has 20% more powerful Honeywell T55-715 engines along with an active parallel actuator system (APAS) to enhance the digital advanced flight-control system, providing an exact torque split between the rotors for greater efficiency. A new fuel system combines the three fuel cells in each sponson into one larger fuel cell and eliminates intracell fuel transfer hardware, reducing weight by 90 kg (200 lb) and increasing fuel capacity. Electrical capacity is increased by three 60 kVA generators. The Advanced Chinook Rotor Blades (ACRB), derived from the cancelled RAH-66 Comanche, were intended to improve lift performance in hot/high altitude conditions by 900 kg (2,000 lb); however, the US Army ultimately decided against implementing the ACRB due to persistent vibration during testing, Boeing denied the assertion that the vibration was a safety risk and believed it could be solved with dampeners. In addition, the aft rotor blade was stalling when in a swept back position.

The U.S. Army plans for a Block 3 upgrade after 2025, which could include a new 6,000 hp (4,500 kW) class engine with boosted power capacity of the transmission and drive train developed under the future affordable turbine engine (FATE) program and a lengthened fuselage. The Future Vertical Lift program is planned to begin replacing the Army's rotorcraft fleet in the mid-2030s, initially focusing on medium-lift helicopters, thus the CH-47 is planned to be in service beyond 2060, over 100 years after the first entered service.

=== MH-47G ===
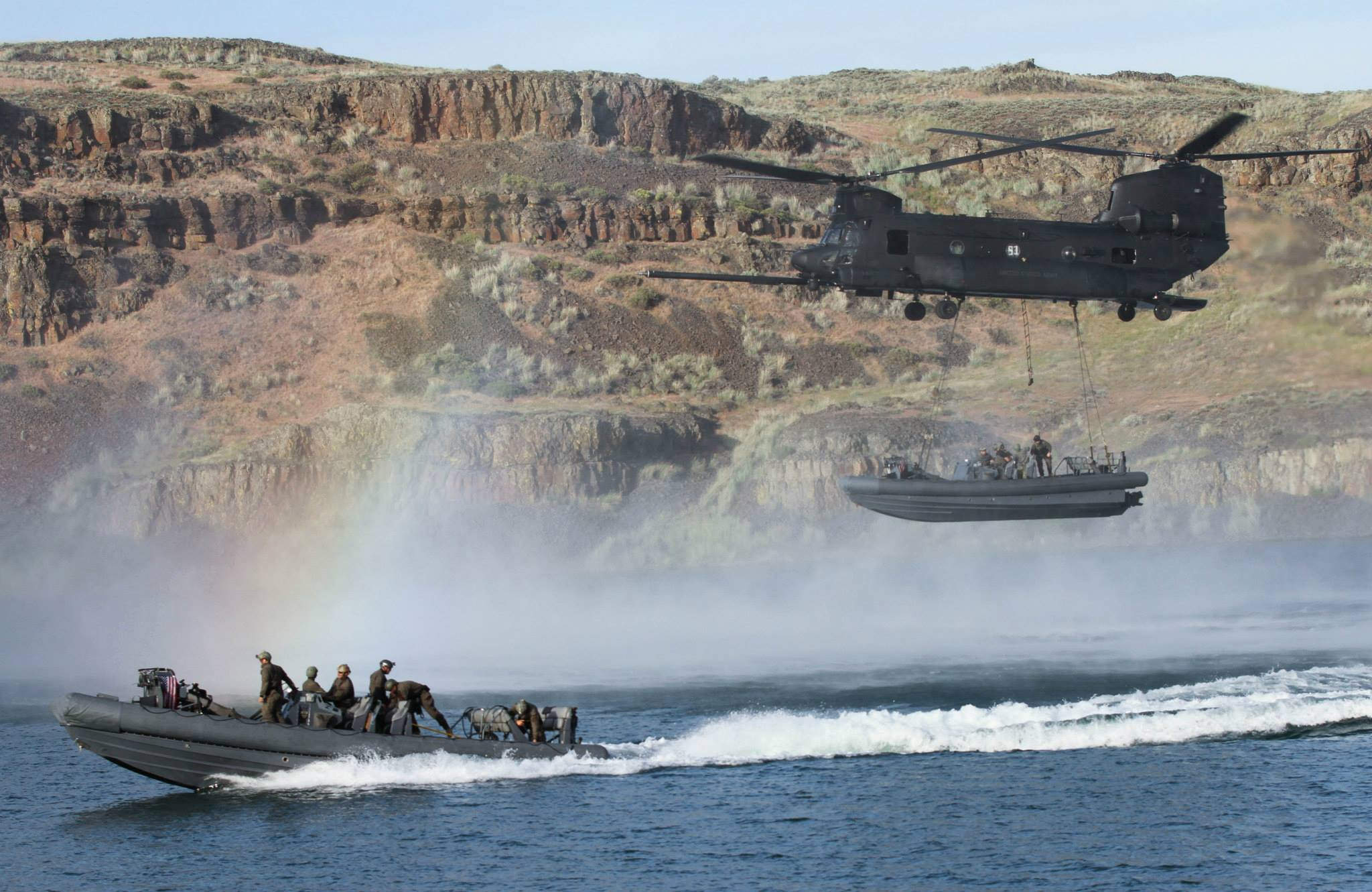
MH-47G Chinook hoisting a Special Boat Team 12 Rigid Hull Inflatable Boat (RHIB) during the MEATS exercise on Moses Lake

The MH-47G Special Operations Aviation (SOA) version is similar to the MH-47E, but features more sophisticated avionics including a digital Common Avionics Architecture System (CAAS). The CAAS is a common glass cockpit used by helicopters such as MH-60K/Ls and CH-53E/Ks. The MH-47G also incorporates all of the new sections of the CH-47F.

The modernization program improves MH-47D and MH-47E Special Operations Chinooks to the MH-47G design specs. A total of 25 MH-47E and 11 MH-47D aircraft were upgraded by the end of 2003. The final MH-47G was delivered to the U.S. Army Special Operations Command (USASOC) on 10 February 2011. Modernization of MH-47D/Es to the MH-47G standard is due by 2015. On 1 September 2020, Boeing announced the delivery of the first MH-47G Block II to USASOC of an initial order of 24, with a stated ultimate requirement for 69. The MH-47G Block II includes all of the improvements from the CH-47F Block II, as well as inflight refueling capability, a comprehensive defensive aids suite and low-level/adverse weather piloting aids, such as forward-looking infrared and multi-mode/terrain-following radar. It is armed with two 7.62 mm M134 Miniguns and two M240 7.62 mm machine guns.

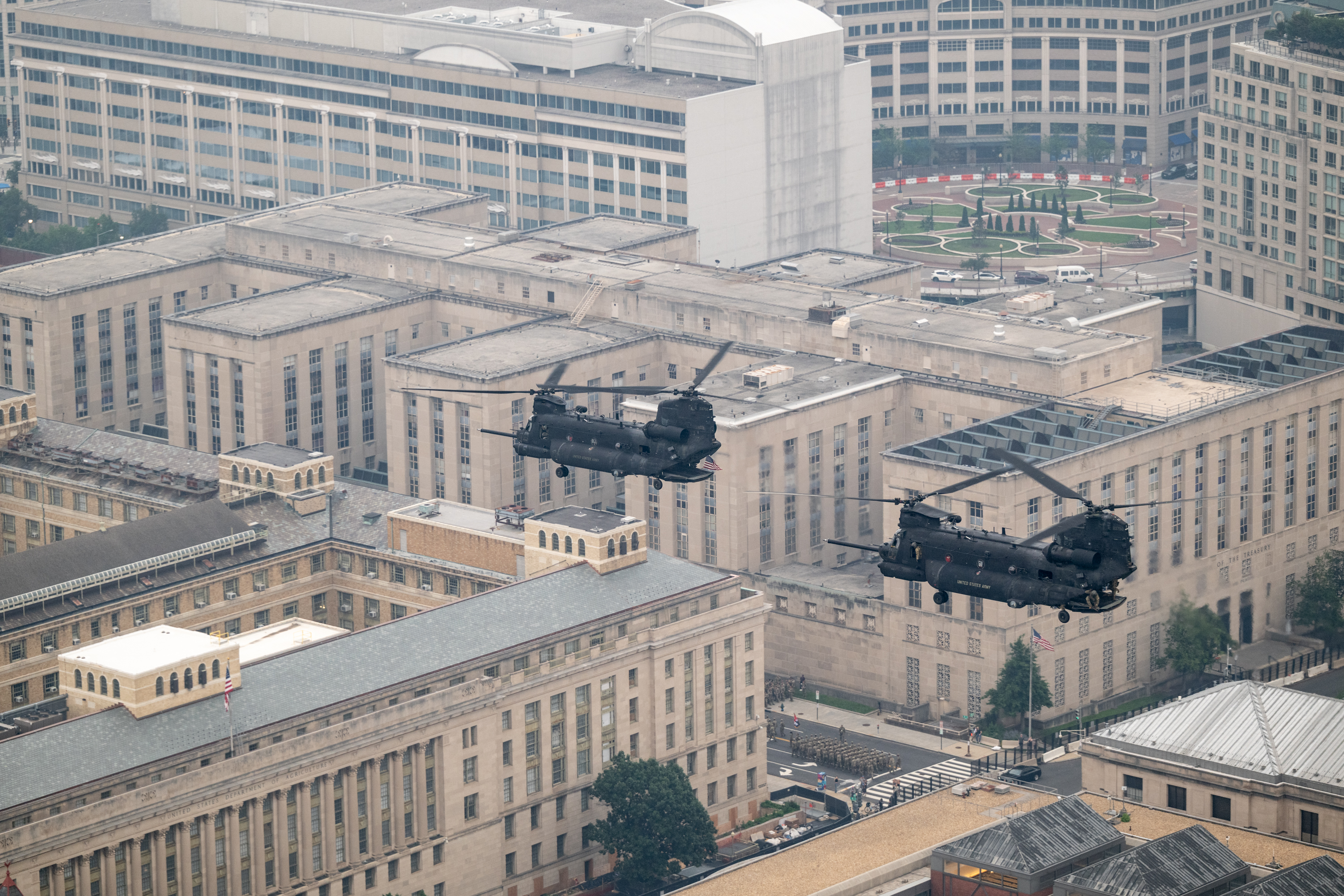
MH-47G Chinooks over Washington D.C.

The British MOD confirmed that while the U.S. does not export the model, the two countries were in discussion regarding the MH-47G as of 2017. On 19 October 2018, the Defense Security Cooperation Agency notified Congress of a possible sale of 16 H-47 Chinooks (Extended Range) to the UK.

=== CH-47J ===
The CH-47J is a medium-transport helicopter for the Japan Ground Self-Defense Force (JGSDF), and the Japan Air Self-Defense Force (JASDF). The differences between the CH-47J and the CH-47D are the engine, rotor brake and avionics, for use for general transportation, SAR and disaster activity like U.S. forces. The CH-47JA, introduced in 1993, is a long-range version of the CH-47J, fitted with an enlarged fuel tank, an AAQ-16 FLIR in a turret under the nose, and a partial glass cockpit. Both versions are built under license in Japan by Kawasaki Heavy Industries, who produced 61 aircraft by April 2001.

The Japan Defense Agency ordered 54 aircraft of which 39 were for the JGSDF and 15 were for the JASDF. Boeing supplied flyable aircraft, to which Kawasaki added full avionics, interior, and final paint. The CH-47J model Chinook (N7425H) made its first flight in January 1986, and it was sent to Kawasaki in April. Boeing began delivering five CH-47J kits in September 1985 for assembly at Kawasaki.

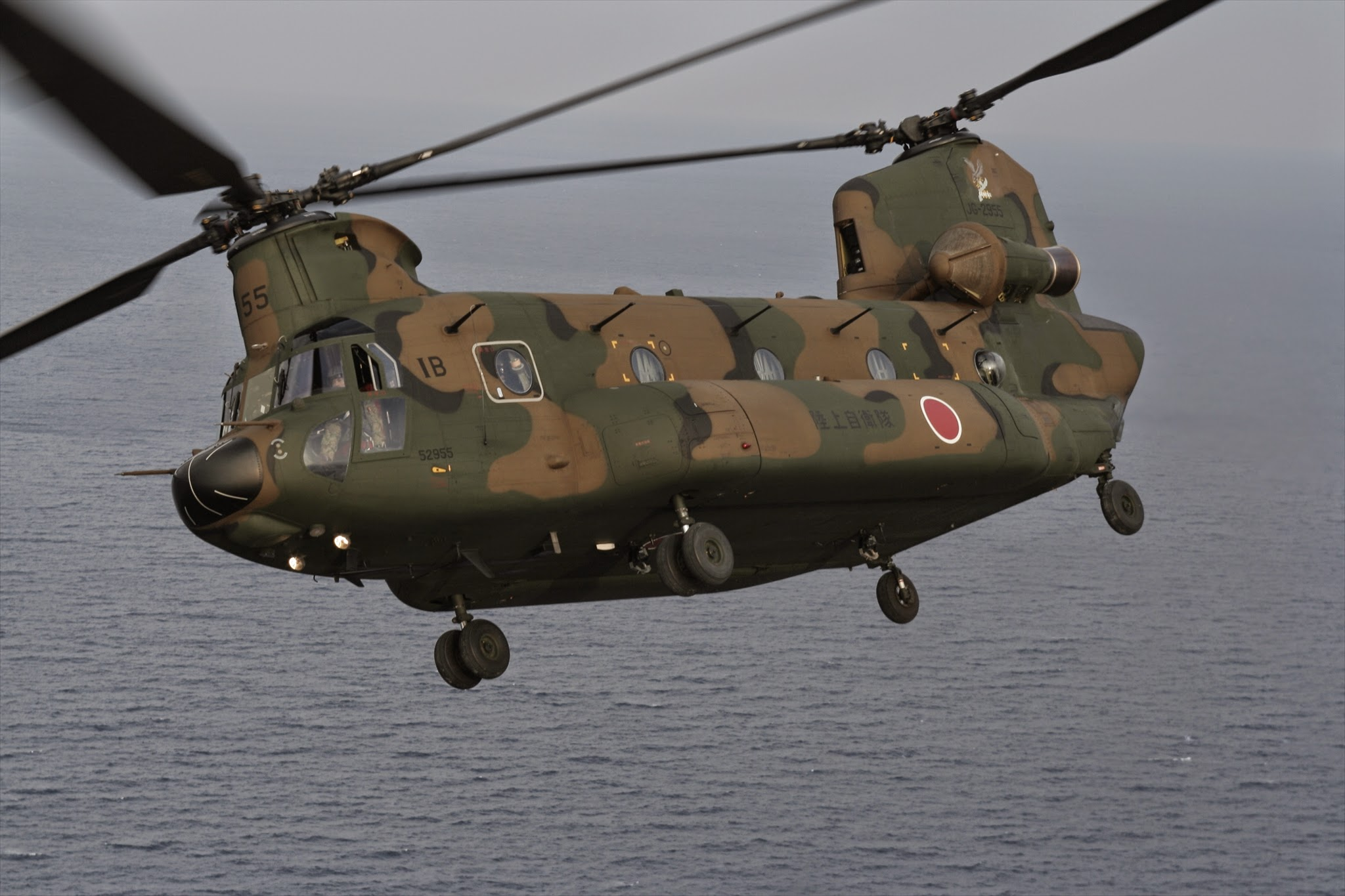
A Japan Ground Self-Defense Force CH-47J, 2014

Over 110 had been produced by the early 21st century, including the CH-47JA model with improved fuel tanks and other upgrades.

=== HH-47 ===
On 9 November 2006, the HH-47, a new variant of the Chinook based on the MH-47G, was selected by the U.S. Air Force as the winner of the Combat Search and Rescue (CSAR-X) competition. Four development HH-47s were to be built, with the first of 141 production aircraft planned to enter service in 2012. However, in February 2007 the contract award was protested and the GAO ordered the CSAR-X project to be re-bid. The CSAR-X program was again terminated in 2009. In February 2010, the USAF announced plans to replace aging HH-60G helicopters, and deferred secondary combat search and rescue requirements calling for a larger helicopter. In a long process the Air Force did not choose the larger Chinook, and the HH-60W entered service by 2020 to replace the older helicopters.

=== Sea Chinook ===
For years the U.S. Navy has been operating different versions of the single-rotor CH-53 helicopter as its heavy-lift helicopter. CH-47s regularly conduct ship-based operations for U.S. Special Forces and other international operators. Due to budget issues, technical problems and delays with CH-53K, the director of the Pentagon's cost assessment office directed US Navy to consider maritime versions of CH-47. Naval versions must be protected against the corrosive seaborne environment and be able to operate from aircraft carriers and amphibious ships.

=== Other export models ===
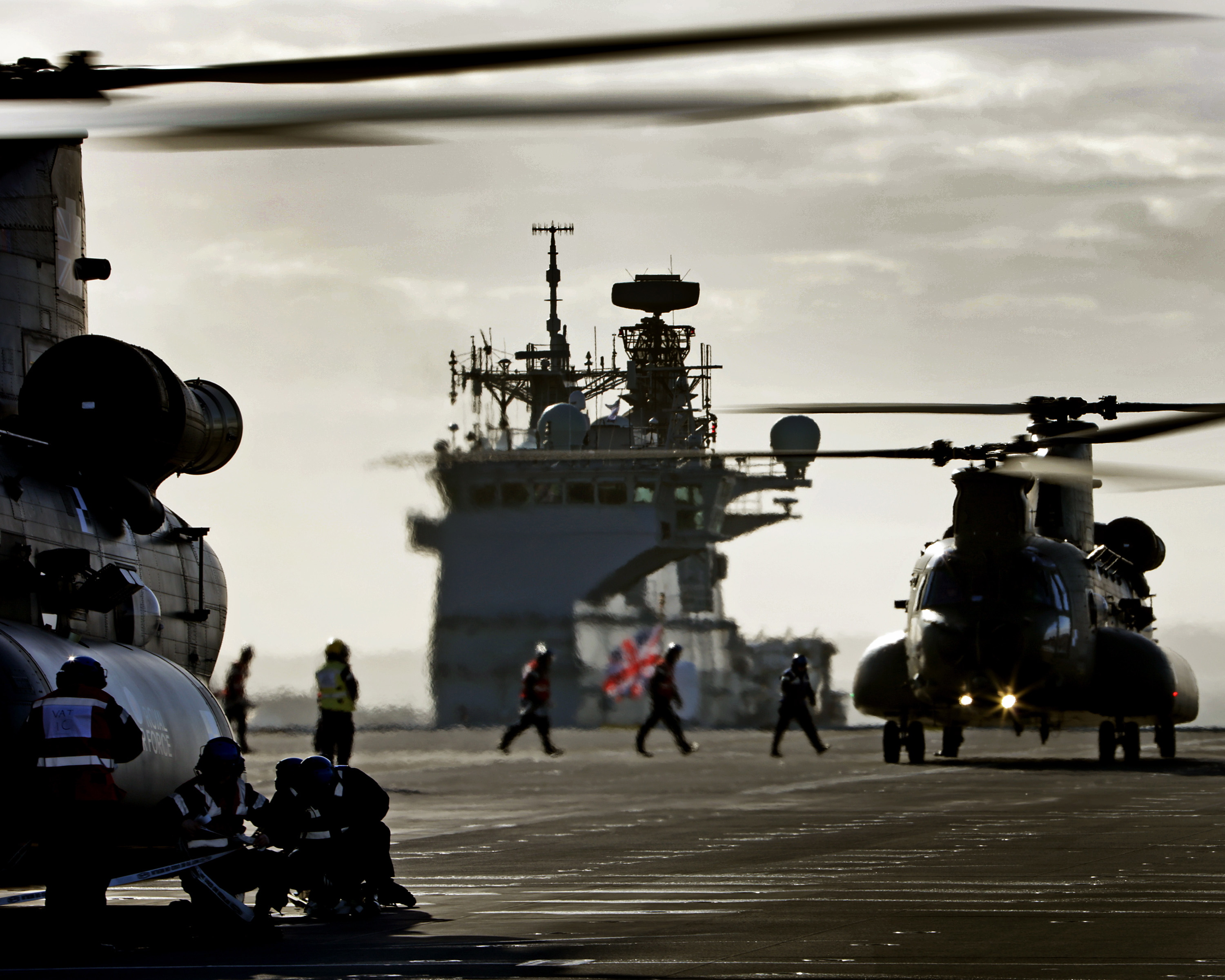
RAF Chinooks onboard HMS Ocean

- Specific British variants of the Chinook serving with the Royal Air Force are designated Chinook HC1 (based on CH-47C but later upgraded), Chinook HC2 and HC2A (the upgraded CH-47C and new CH-47D respectively). Additional types in RAF service include HC3 (intended as low cost MH-47E for special forces use but converted to HC.2 after years of delay in achieving airworthiness) HC.4 and HC.5 (upgraded HC.2 and HC.3) and HC.6/HC.6A (based on CH-47F).
- The base designation CH-147 Chinook was used for CH-47 Chinook upgrades and variants exported to the Canadian Armed Forces, while maintaining the same alphabetical designation (CH-147C, CH-147D, etc.) alphabetical variation identifiers as the US variants they were based on.
- The export version of the CH-47C Chinook for the Italian Army was designated "CH-47C Plus".
- The HH-47D is a search and rescue version for the Republic of Korea Air Force.
- The CH-47DG is an upgraded version of the CH-47C for Greece.
- While the CH-47SD (also known as the "Super D") is a modified variant for Singapore of the CH-47D, with extended range fuel tanks and higher payload carrying capacity; the CH-47SD is in use by the Republic of Singapore Air Force, Hellenic Army and the Republic of China Army.

=== Civilian models ===
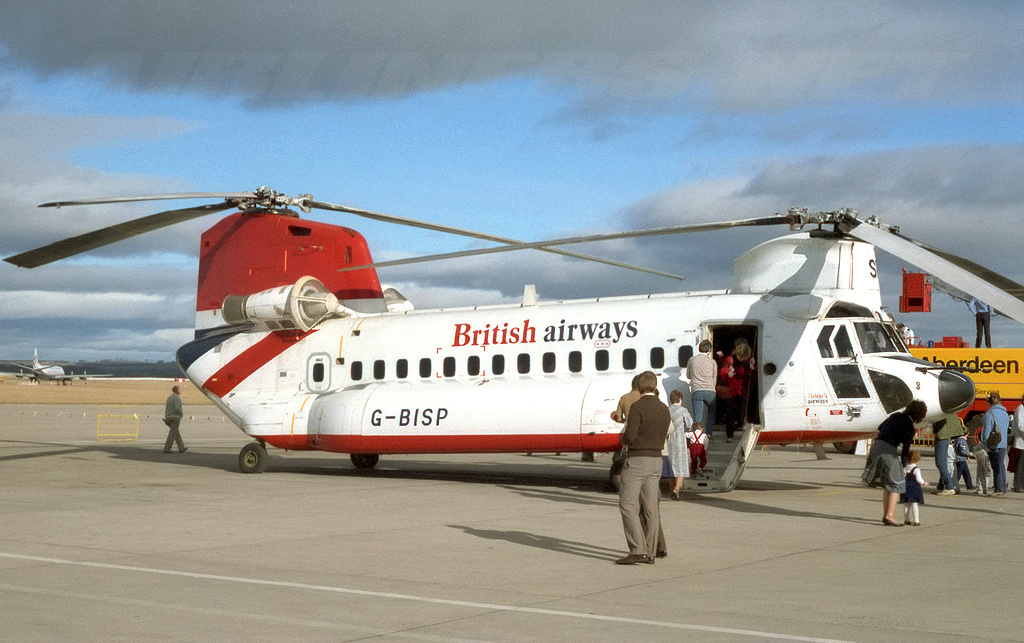
- British Airways Helicopters 234LR at Aberdeen Airport in 1985
  Model 234LR (long range): Commercial transport helicopter. The Model 234LR can be fitted out as an all-passenger, all-cargo, or cargo/passenger transport helicopter.
- Model 234ER (extended range): Commercial transport version.
- Model MLR (multi-purpose long range): Commercial transport version.
- Model 234UT (utility transport): Utility transport helicopter.
- Model 414: The Model 414 is the international export version of the CH-47D. It is also known as the CH-47D International Chinook.
- CU-47: Built by Unical from parts from ex-Canadian Forces CH-47D/CH-147D for Coulson Aviation to be used for aerial firefighting.

=== Derivatives ===
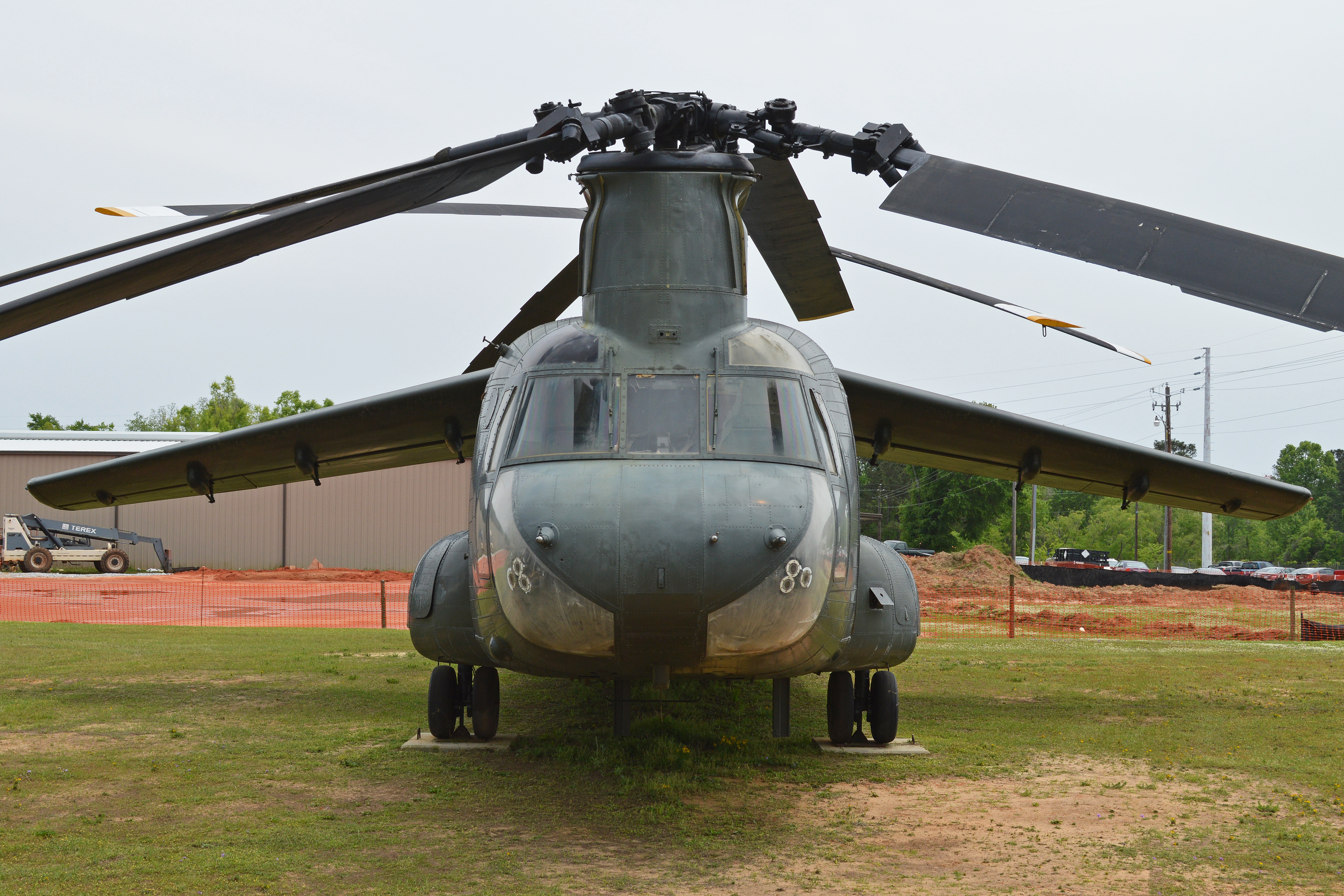
The winged BV-347

In 1969, work on the experimental BV-347 was begun. It was a CH-47A with a lengthened fuselage, four-blade rotors, detachable wings mounted on top of the fuselage and other changes. It first flew on 27 May 1970 and was evaluated for a few years.

In 1973, the Army contracted with Boeing to design a "Heavy Lift Helicopter" (HLH), designated XCH-62A. It appeared to be a scaled-up CH-47 without a conventional body, in a configuration similar to the S-64 Skycrane (CH-54 Tarhe), but the project was canceled in 1975. The program was restarted for test flights in the 1980s and was again not funded by Congress. The scaled-up model of the HLH was scrapped in late 2005 at Fort Rucker, Alabama.

== Operators ==
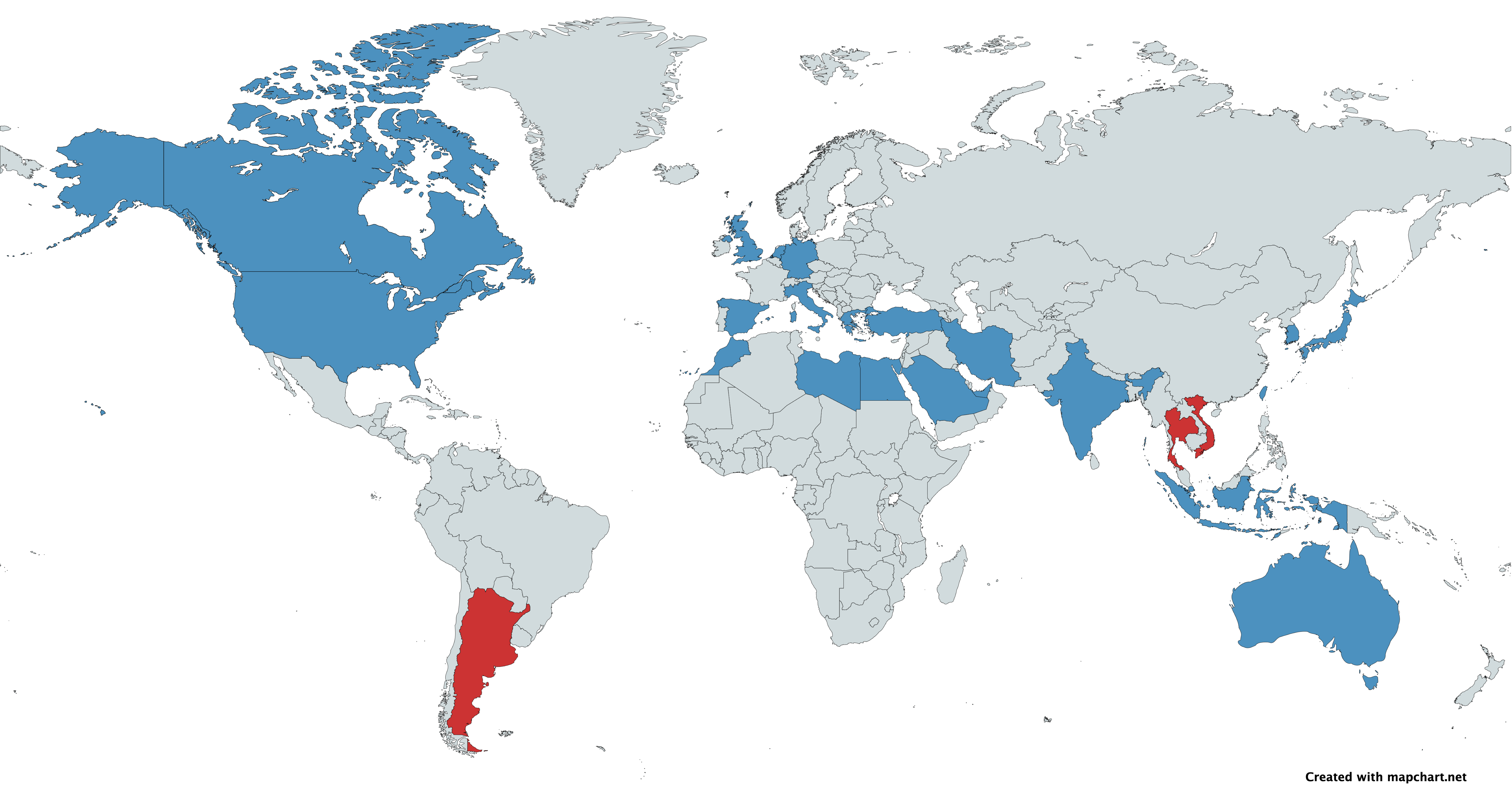
Boeing CH-47 Chinook operators: Current Former

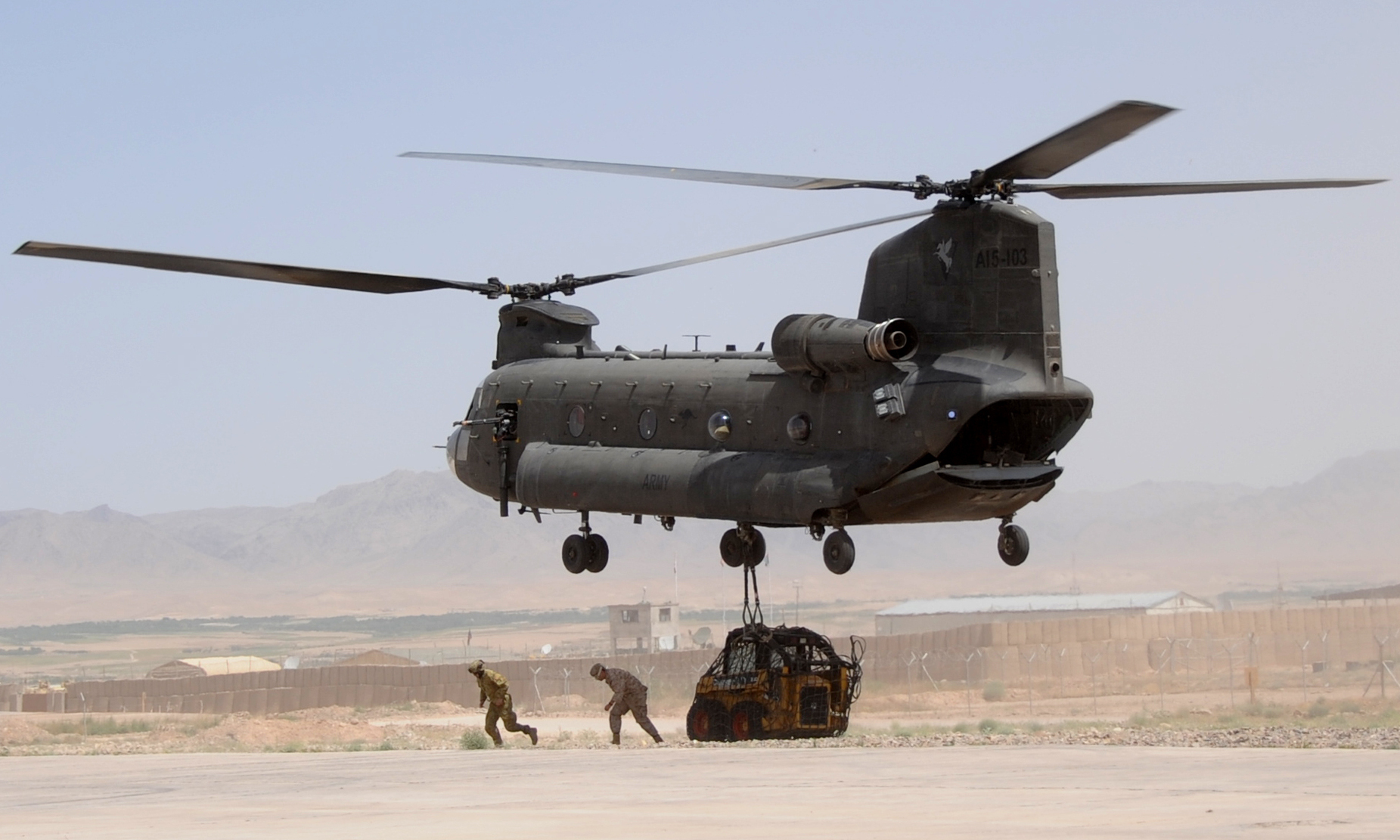
Australian Chinook at Camp Riley, Afghanistan, 2012

Australia

- Australian Army – operates 14 CH-47F Chinooks.

Canada

- Royal Canadian Air Force – 14 CH-147F Chinooks as of January 2025.

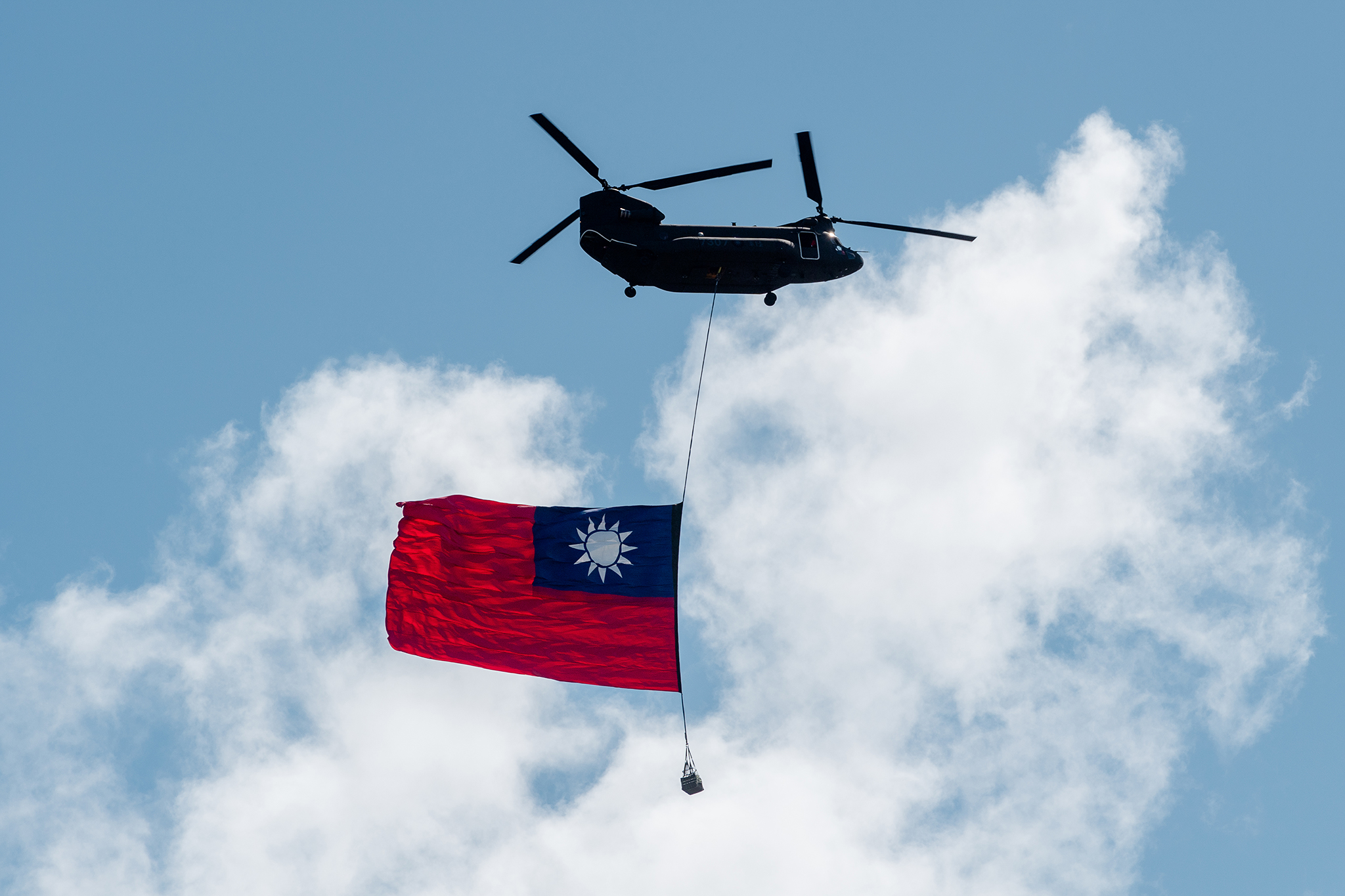
Republic of China Army CH-47 during the 2021 National Day celebration ceremony

Republic of China

- Republic of China Army

Egypt

- Egyptian Air Force

Germany

- German Air Force – 60 CH-47F ordered.

Greece

- Hellenic Army

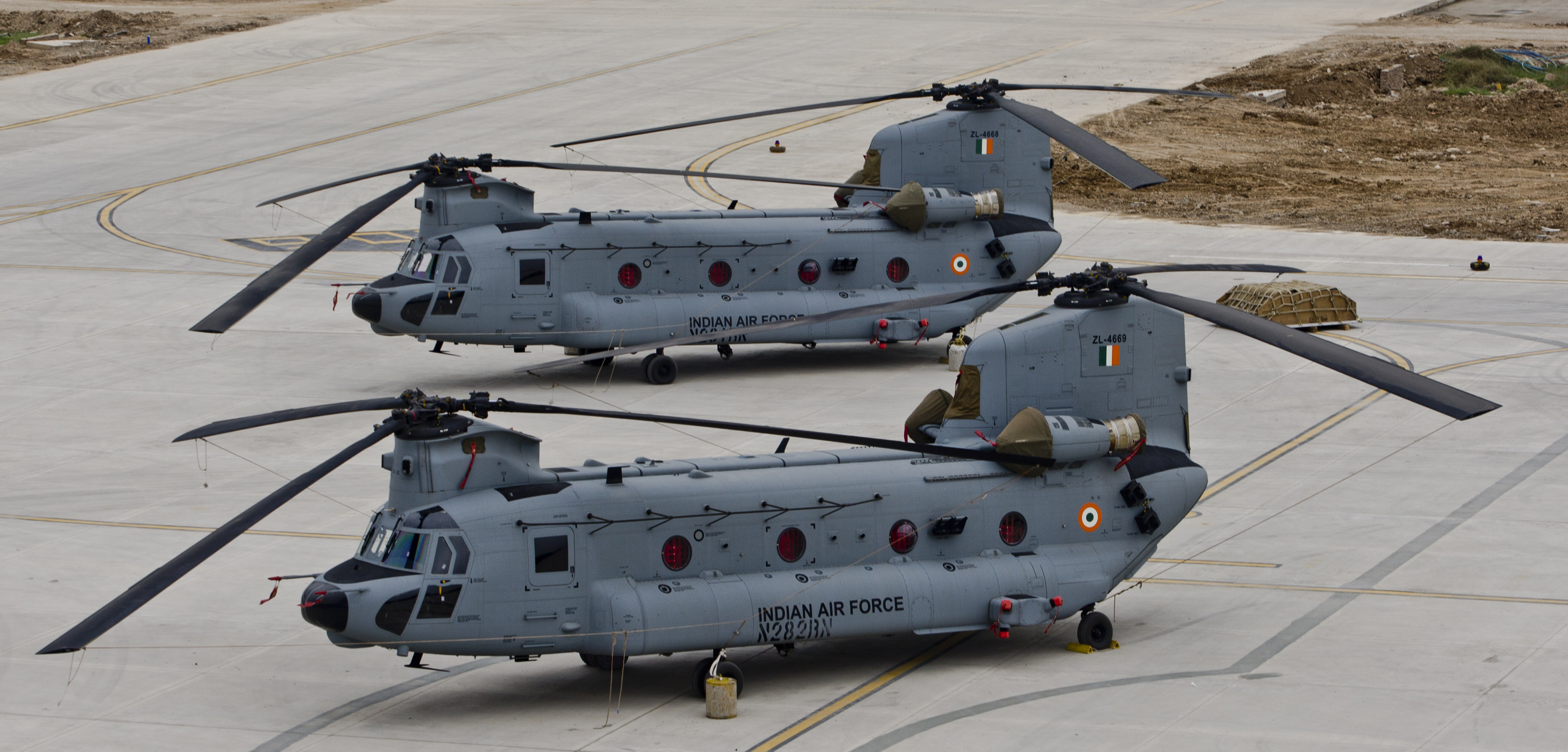
Two Indian Air Force CH-47F Chinooks in March 2019

India

- Indian Air Force

Iran

- Islamic Republic of Iran Army

Italy

- Italian Army

Japan

- Japan Air Self-Defense Force operates 15 CH-47Js as of March 2022.
- Japan Ground Self-Defense Force operates 47 CH-47J/JAs as of March 2022.

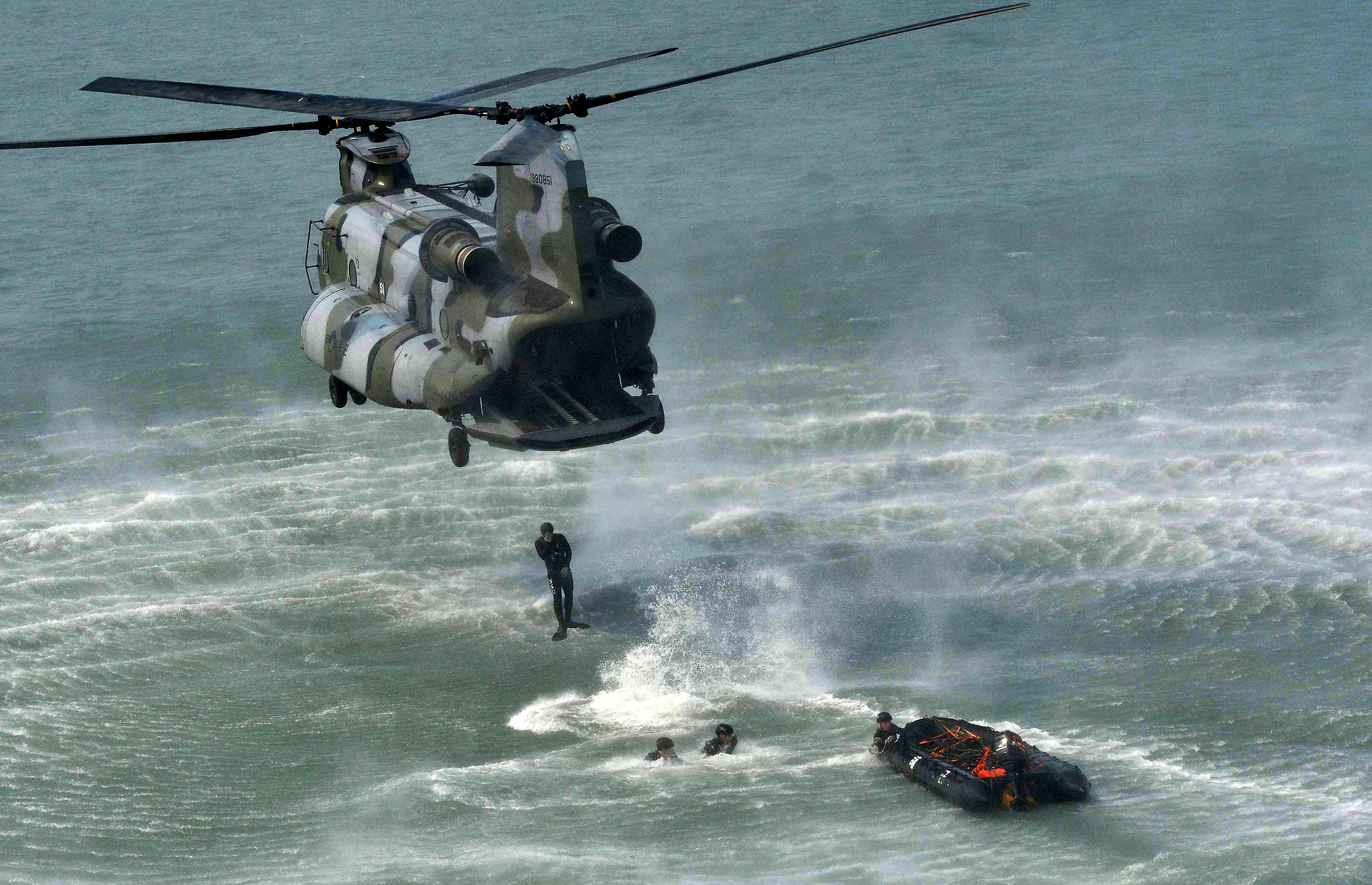
Republic of Korea Army Chinook deploying rescue divers in April 2015

Republic of Korea

- Republic of Korea Army

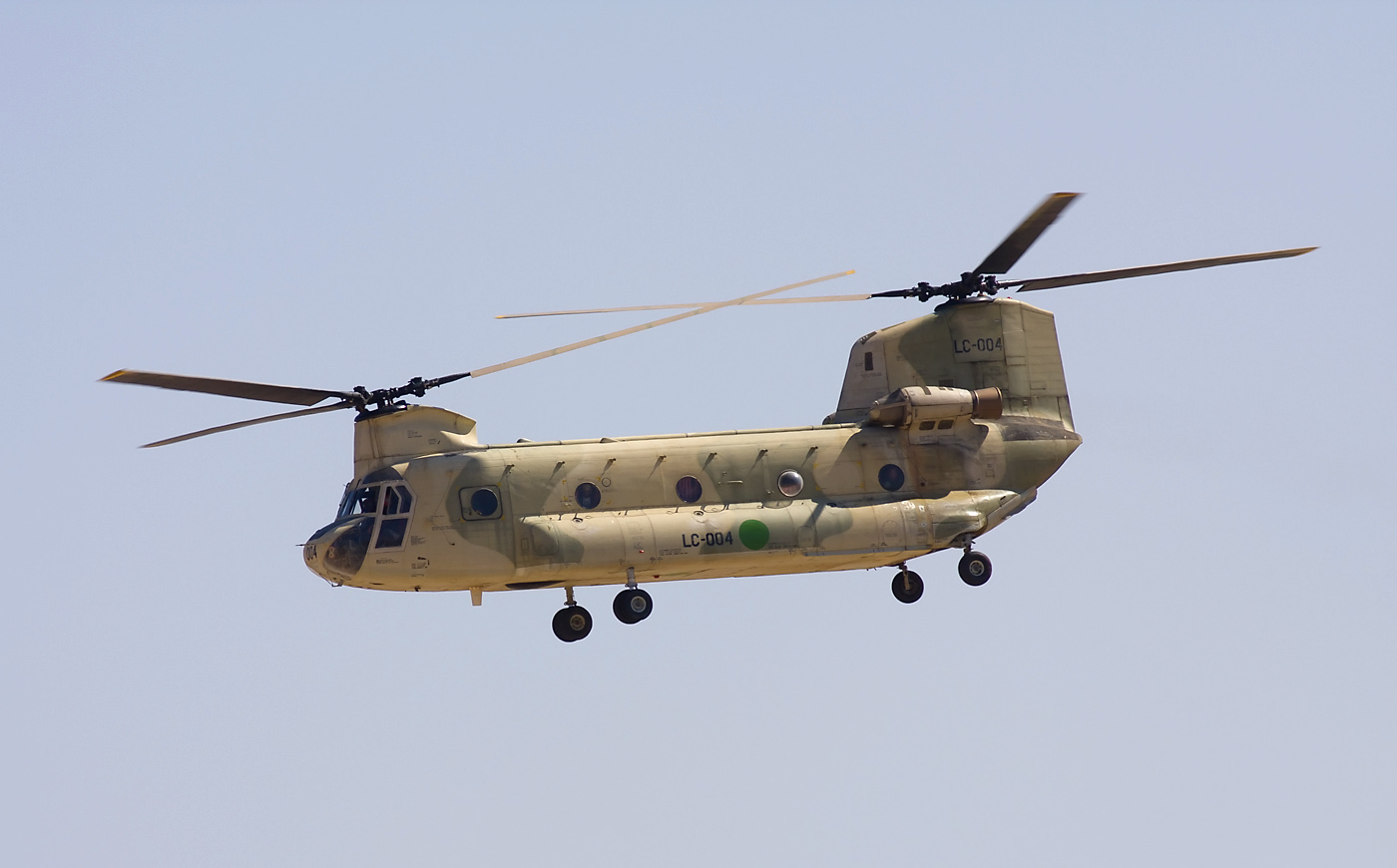
Libyan Air Force CH-47 in 2009

Libya

- Libyan Air Force

Morocco

- Royal Moroccan Air Force

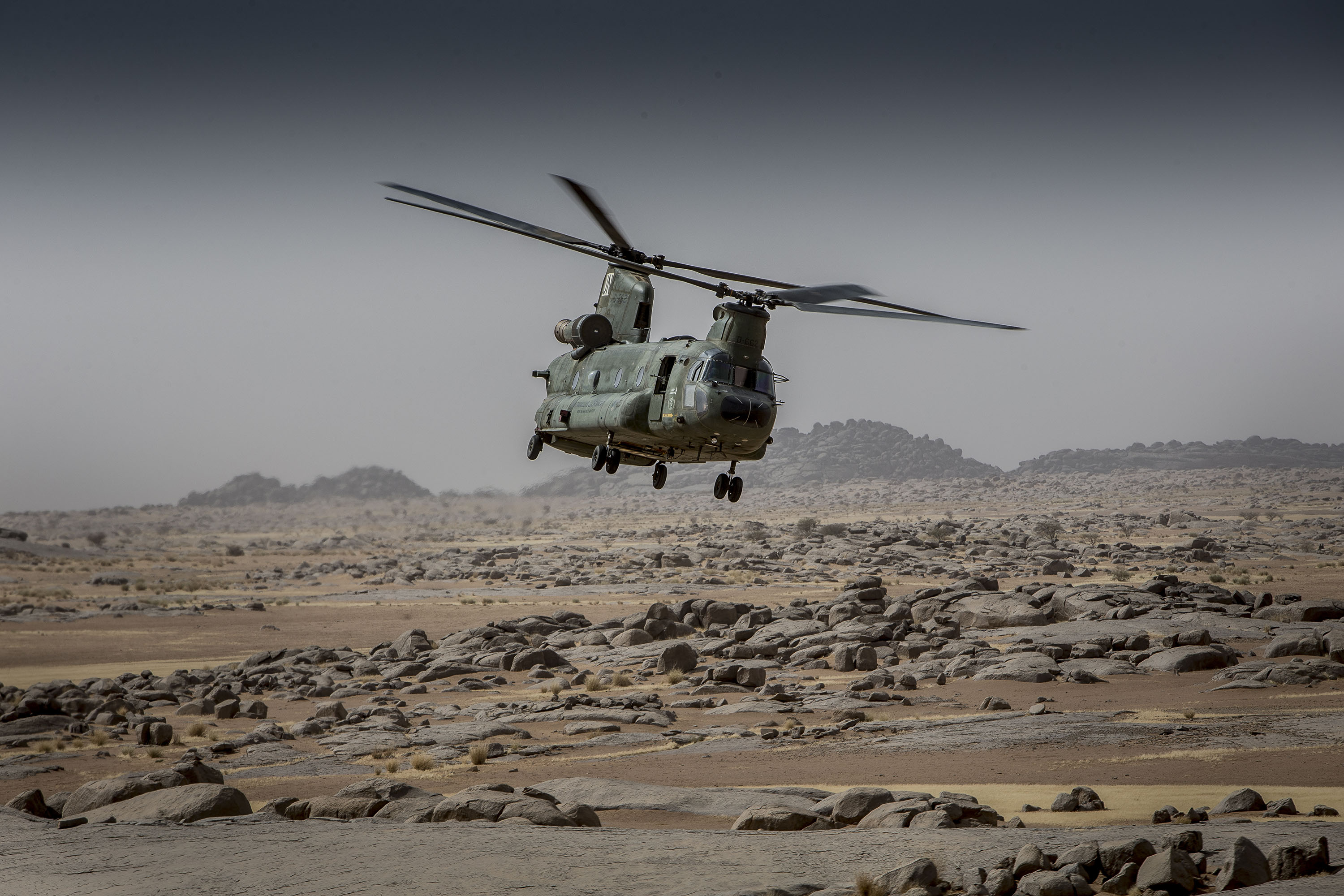
A Netherlands Air Force Chinook in Mali

Netherlands

- Royal Netherlands Air and Space Force

Saudi Arabia

- Royal Saudi Land Forces

Singapore

- Republic of Singapore Air Force

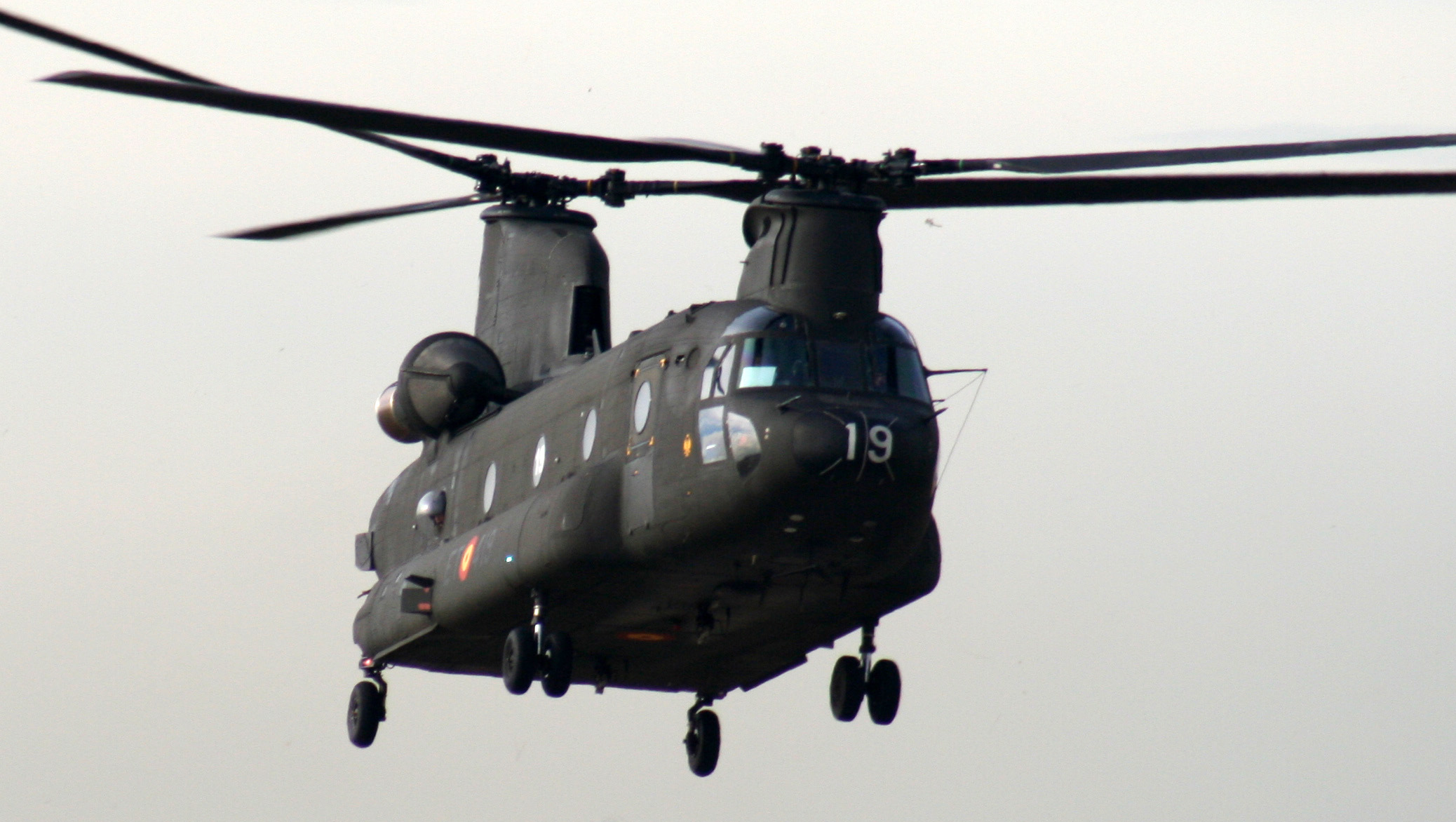
Spanish C-47D in 2010

Spain

- Spanish Army Airmobile Force

Turkey

- Turkish Army

United Arab Emirates

- United Arab Emirates Air Force

United Kingdom

- Royal Air Force

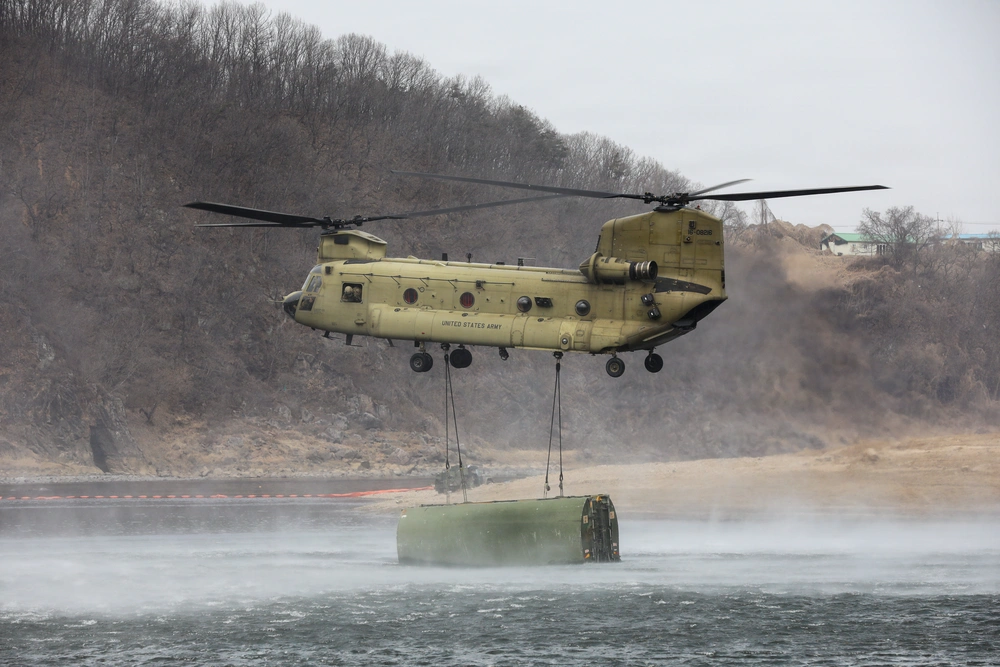
US Army Chinook in Freedom Shield 2026 in South Korea

United States

- United States Army operates 465 CH-47F Chinook as of January 2025.
- Army National Guard
- United States Army Reserve

=== Former operators ===
Argentina

- Argentine Air Force
- Argentine Army

Australia

- Royal Australian Air Force (later transferred to the Australian Army)

Indonesia

- Indonesian National Board for Disaster Management

South Vietnam

- Republic of Vietnam Air Force

Thailand

- Royal Thai Army

Republic of China

- National Airborne Service Corps

United Kingdom

- British Airways Helicopters

United States

- NASA

Vietnam

- Vietnam People's Air Force

== Accidents ==
- On 4 May 1966, a CH-47A crashed near Di Linh, Lâm Đồng Province killing all 20 on board.
- On 26 December 1967, a CH-47A carrying 33 military passengers and crew crashed in a landing descent at Phu Cat AFB, Binh Dinh Province, South Vietnam killing 8 of those on board.
- On 6 May 1969 a CH-47 carrying 83 people crashed 3 miles (4.8 km) southwest of Phước Vĩnh Base Camp, South Vietnam, killing 40 of those on board.
- On 18 August 1971, CH-47A airframe 66-19023 was operated by the 4th Aviation Company, 15th Aviation Group. The helicopter was transporting 33 soldiers of the Heavy Mortar Platoon, 2nd Battalion, 4th Infantry Regiment, 56th Field Artillery Brigade from battalion headquarters in Ludwigsburg to Grafenwöhr Training Area for live fire training exercises. Fatigue failure of the rear rotor blade led to its separation causing structural damage resulting in the crash and explosion that killed all 37 on board, including four crew members. A memorial plaque that was placed near the crash site in the forest outside Pegnitz was stolen in 2009.
- On 28 November 1971, a CH-47C carrying five crew and 28 soldiers from the 101st Airborne Division on a flight from Da Nang to Phu Bai Combat Base, South Vietnam crashed into high ground killing all on board.
- On 18 October 1974, a CH-47C, US serial 74-22058 assigned 147001 but was never marked with Canadian Forces. The aircraft was lost on its delivery flight to Canada following gear failure in main combining gear box, caused by undetected metal infraction in gear blank before machining. This failure led to drive shaft failure and loss of synchronization and resulted in five fatalities. After a lengthy litigation, it was replaced by 147009.
- On 11 September 1982 at an airshow in Mannheim, Germany, a U.S. Army Chinook (serial number 74-22292) carrying parachutists crashed, killing 46 people. The crash was later found to have been caused by an accumulation of ground walnut shell grit used for cleaning machinery, which blocked lubrication from reaching transmission bearings. The accident resulted in the eventual discontinuation of the use of walnut grit as a cleaning agent.
- On 4 February 1985, a Royal Australian Air Force (RAAF) CH-47C (A15-001) crashed into Perseverance Dam, Toowoomba, Queensland, Australia. The Royal Air Force (RAF) exchange pilot was rescued from the submerged cockpit but later died in hospital.
- On 6 November 1986, a British International Helicopters Chinook crashed on approach to Sumburgh Airport, Shetland Islands resulting in the loss of 45 lives and the withdrawal of the Chinook from crew-servicing flights in the North Sea.
- On 1 March 1991, Major Marie Therese Rossi Cayton was killed when her U.S. Army Chinook helicopter crashed into an unlit microwave tower during a dust storm. She was the first American woman to fly in combat, during Desert Storm in 1991.
- On 2 June 1994, an RAF CH-47 carrying 25 British MI5, police, and military intelligence experts and 4 crew, flown from Northern Ireland to Scotland for a conference, crashed on the Mull of Kintyre.
- On 30 October 1997, a civilian BV234UT operated by Columbia Helicopters (registration C-FHFH) engaged in logging operations crashed on Vancouver Island, Canada, killing both of the pilots. The investigation determined that the helicopter lost yaw control due to failure of flight control computer.
- On 29 May 2001, a Republic of Korea Army (ROK Army) CH-47D installing a sculpture onto Olympic Bridge in Seoul, South Korea failed to unlatch the sculpture. The helicopter's rotors struck the monument; then the fuselage hit and broke into two. One section crashed onto the bridge in flames and the other fell into the river. All three crew members on board died.
- On 22 February 2002, a U.S. Army special forces MH-47E crashed at sea in the Philippines, killing all ten U.S. soldiers on board.
- On 11 September 2004, a Hellenic Army Aviation CH-47SD crashed into the sea off Mount Athos. All 17 people on board were killed, including four senior figures in the Greek Orthodox Church of Alexandria.
- On 6 April 2005, the U.S. Army CH-47D known as "Big Windy 25" crashed during a sandstorm near Ghazni, Afghanistan, killing all eighteen aboard (fifteen soldiers and three contractors). The pilots had been disoriented by the dust storm.
- On 7 January 2013, a BV-234 N241CH owned by Columbia Helicopters, crashed shortly after taking off from the airport in Pucallpa, Coronel Portillo Province, Peru. All seven crew members were killed.
- On 21 July 2022, a CH-47D registered N388RA & operated by Rotak Helicopters crashed into the Salmon River near North Fork, Idaho while conducting firefighting operations on the Moose Fire, killing both pilots. The NTSB report cites the cause of the accident as "The failure of the flight crew to properly secure a company-issued iPad, leading to its migration into and jamming of the copilot’s left pedal, preventing the pilot from arresting a left yaw, and resulting in a loss of control."
- On 20 June 2023, a Royal Canadian Air Force CH-147F crashed in the Ottawa River near CFB Petawawa. The helicopter belonged to the 450 Tactical Helicopter Squadron. Two crew members died while the other two were hospitalized with non-life-threatening injuries. Accident investigators revealed that the cause of the crash was the crew suffering from spatial disorientation, causing the aircraft to hit the water.
- On 29 October 2026, four people (two Red Cross workers and two Italian soldiers) were killed when an Italian CH-47 belonging to the EU peacekeeping force EUFOR crashed in Bosnia and Herzegovina. Eleven other occupants on board the helicopter were injured.

== Aircraft on display ==
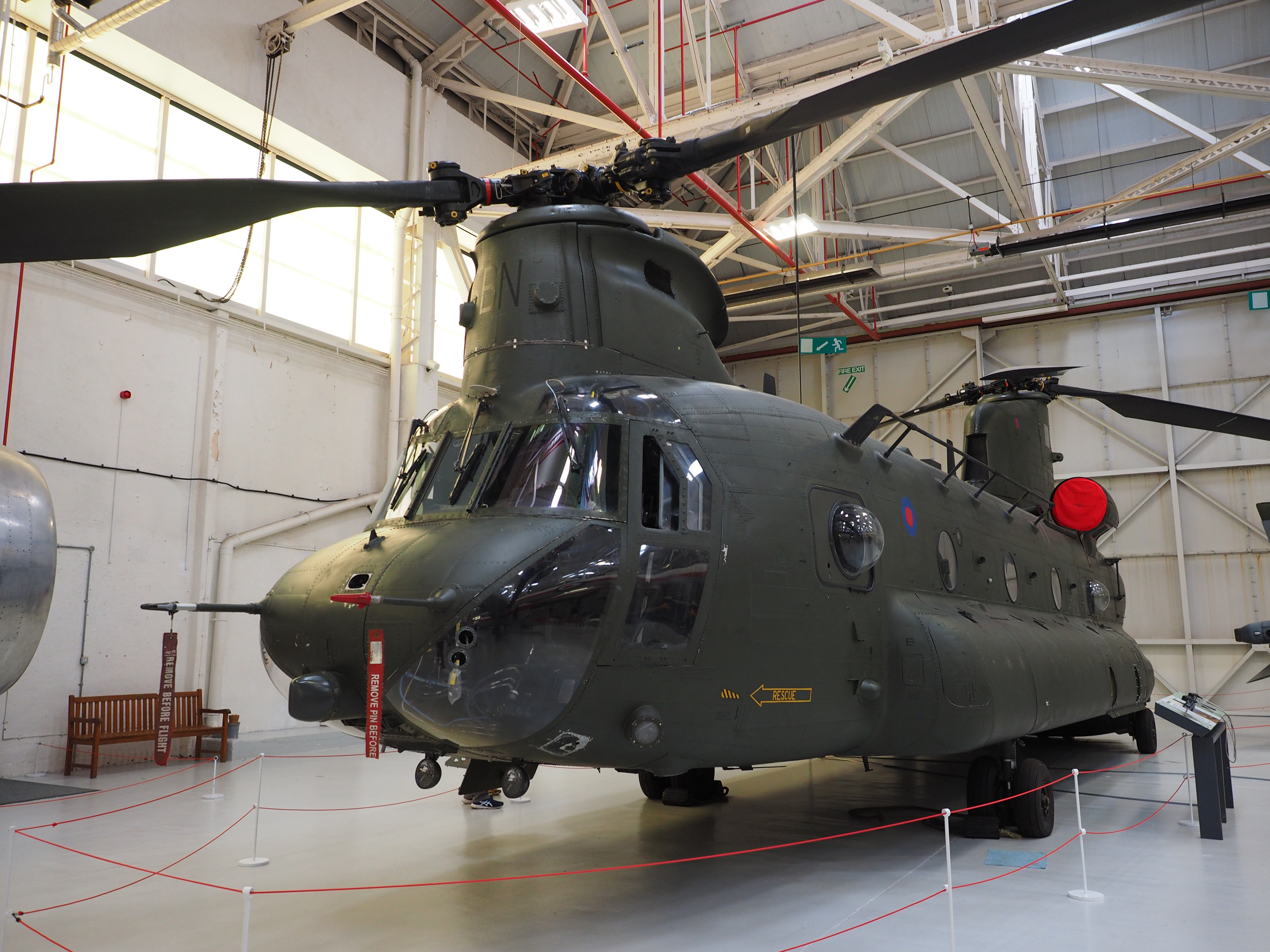
The famed Bravo November helicopter, now retired and on display at RAF Museum Cosford (shown here in 2022)

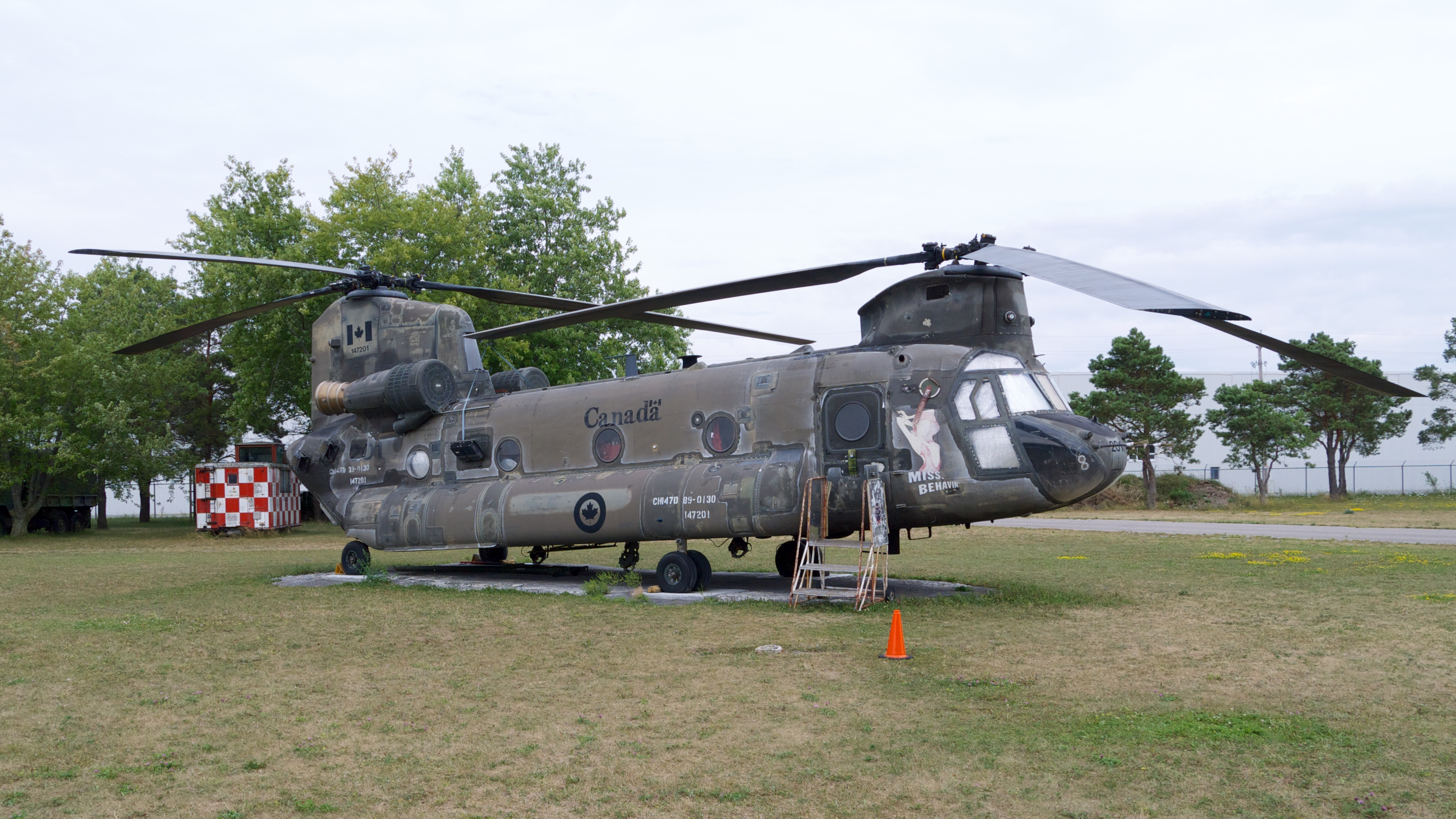
CH-47D in Canadian museum

=== Argentina ===
- H-91 - CH-47C on display at the Museo Nacional de Aeronáutica de Argentina in Morón, Buenos Aires.

=== Australia ===
- A15-104 - CH-47D on display at the Australian Army Flying Museum in Oakey, Queensland.

=== Canada ===
- 147201 - CH-47D on display at the National Air Force Museum of Canada in Trenton, Ontario.
- 147206 - CH-47D preserved as a gate guardian at CFB Petawawa.

=== Italy ===
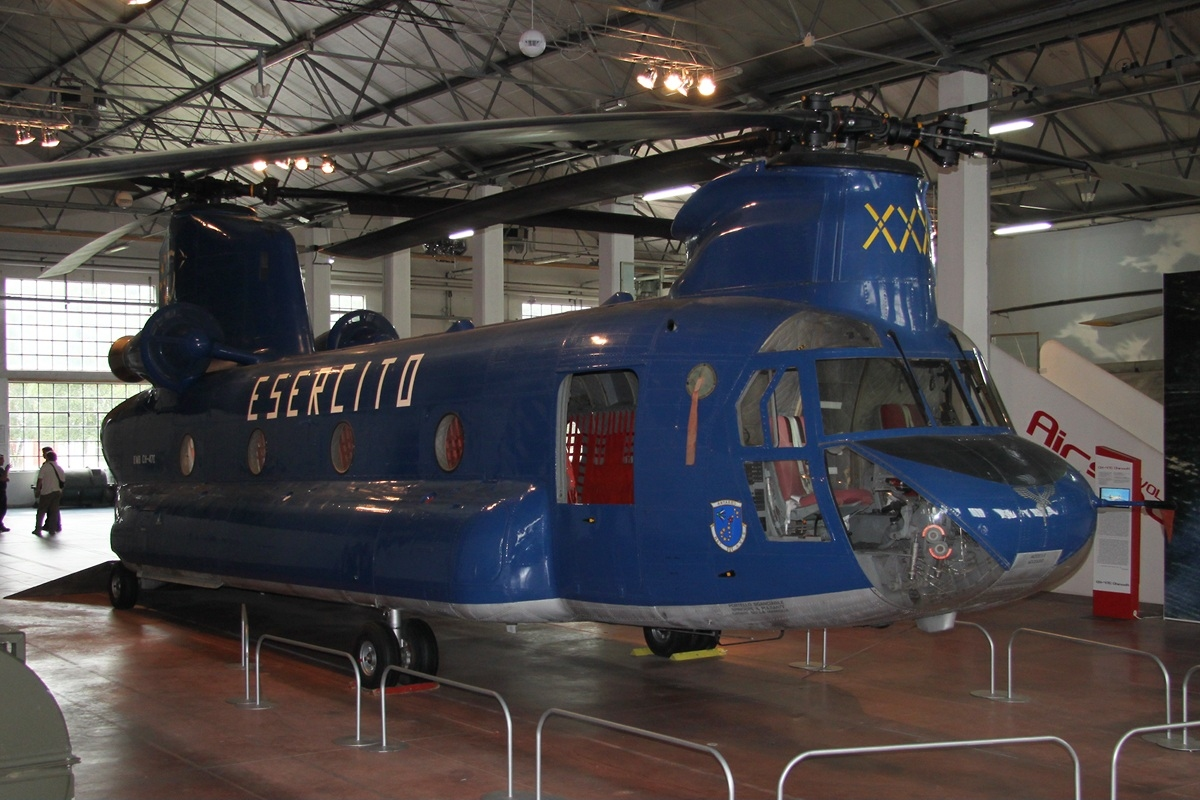
CH-47C on display at Volandia

- MM80840 - CH-47C on display at Volandia in Somma Lombardo.

=== United Kingdom ===
- 83-24104 - Former US Army CH-47D forward section on display at Royal Air Force Museum London, modified to represent "Bravo November".

=== United States ===
- 59-4984 - YCH-47A on display at the U.S. Army Transportation Museum in Fort Eustis, Virginia.
- 60-3451 - CH-47A on display at the United States Army Aviation Museum in Fort Rucker, Alabama.
- 61-2408 - CH-47A on display in a park across the street from the Don F. Pratt Memorial Museum in Fort Campbell, Kentucky.
- 64-13149 - ACH-47A on display at the Redstone Arsenal in Alabama.
- 65-7992 - Model 347 on display at the United States Army Aviation Museum in Fort Rucker, Alabama.
- 68-15992 - CH-47D on display at the U.S. Space & Rocket Center. in Huntsville, Alabama.
- 85-24346 - CH-47D on display at the Combat Air Museum on Topeka Regional Airport (Forbes Field) in Topeka, Kansas.
- 89-00153 - CH-47D on display at Castle Air Museum in Atwater, California.
- 90-00222 - CH-47D on display outside at Fort Knox, Kentucky.
- 09-03783 - MH-47G on display at Tennessee Wings of Liberty Museum in Clarksville, Tennessee.

=== Vietnam ===
- 65-8025 - CH-47A on display at the Khe Sanh Combat Museum.
- 66-0086 - CH-47A on display at the War Remnants Museum in Ho Chi Minh City (Saigon).
- 66-19082 - CH-47A on display at the Vietnam Military History Museum in Hanoi.

== Specifications (CH-47F) ==
Orthographically projected diagram of the Boeing Vertol CH-47 Chinook

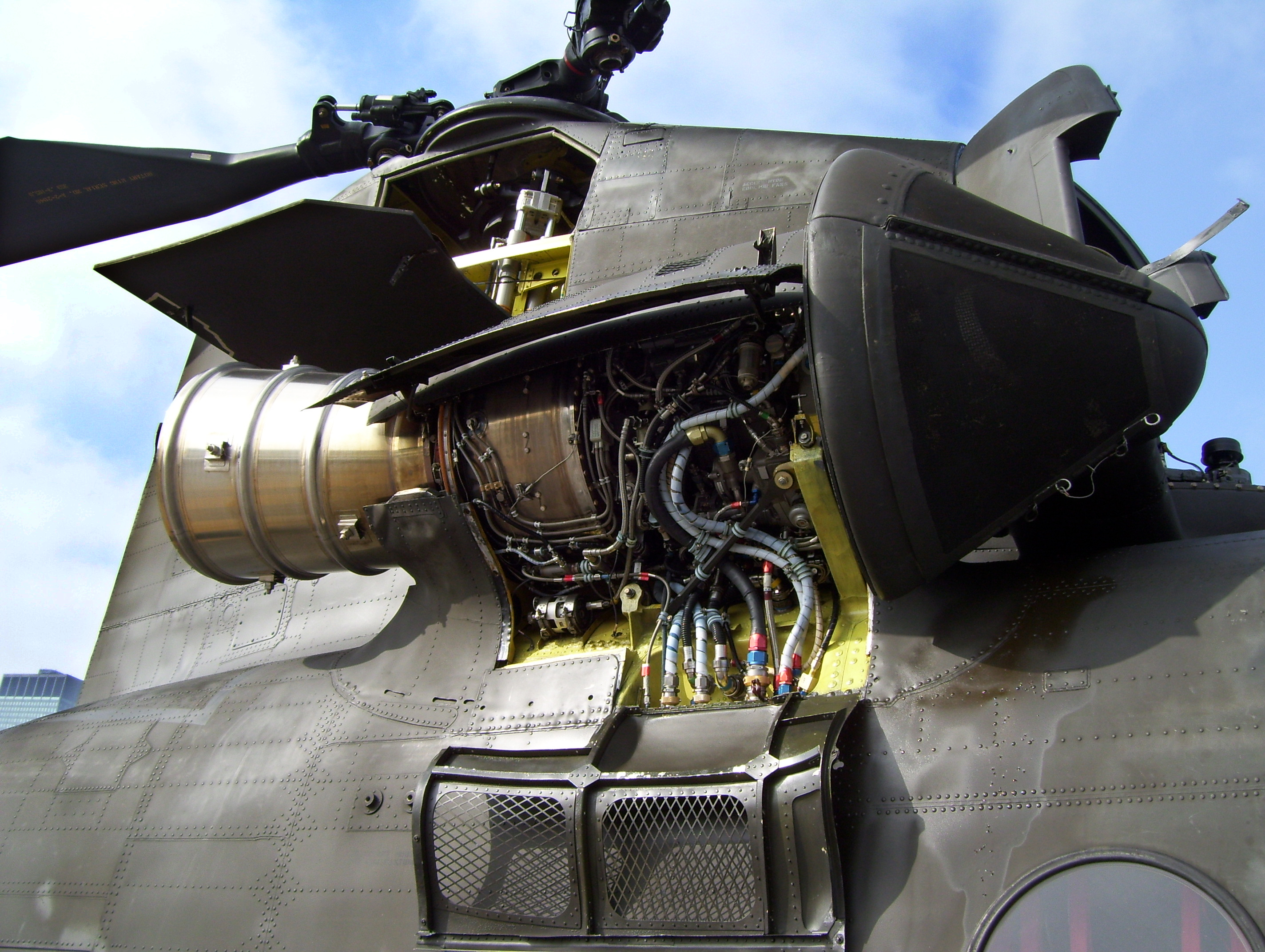
Turboshaft engine on the rear of a CH-47

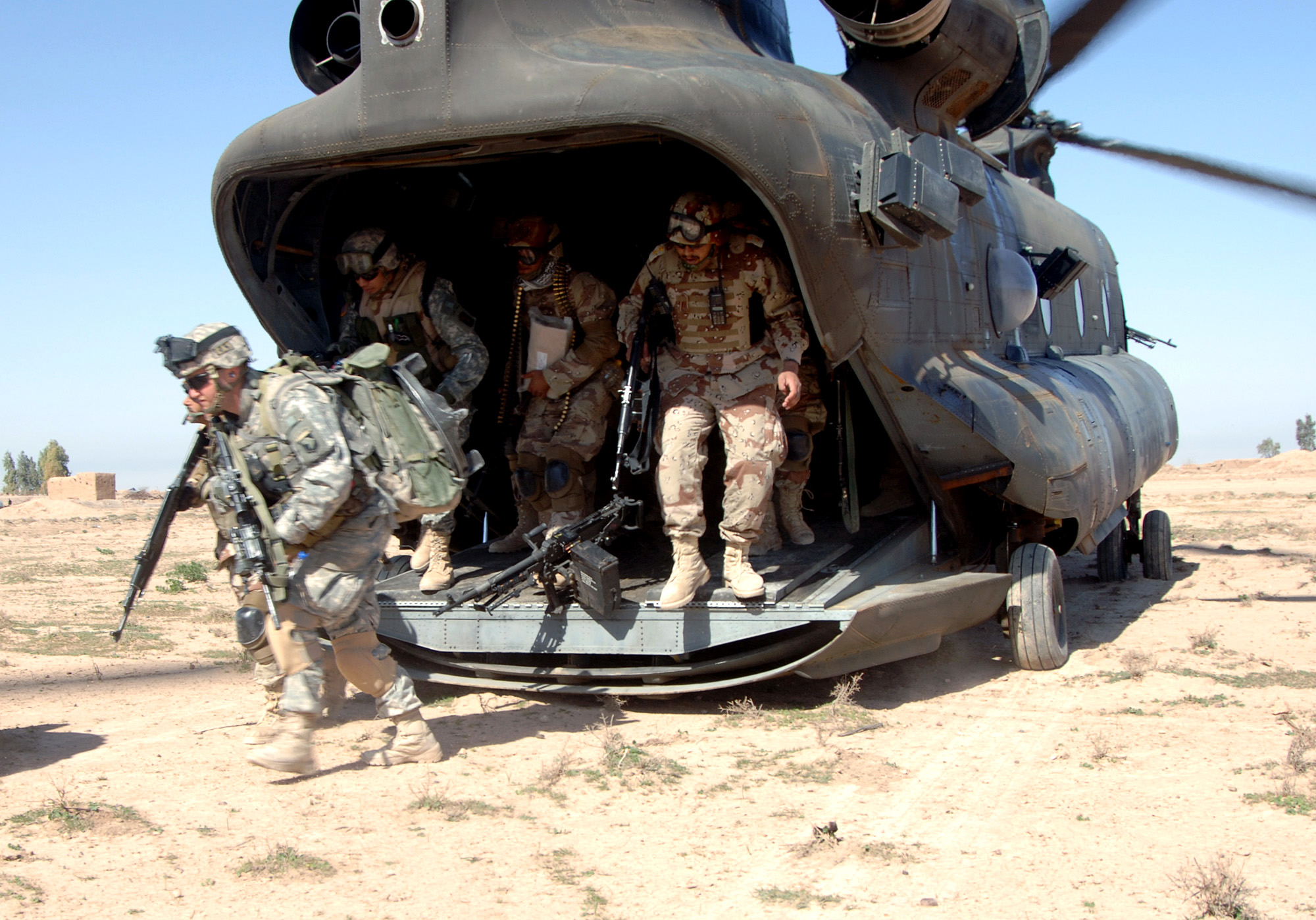
M240 machine gun emplacement on the loading ramp, with another M240 partly visible on the right shoulder window

Data from Boeing CH-47, Army Chinook file, CH-47F, International Directory, CH-47D

General characteristics

- Crew: 3 (pilot, copilot, flight engineer or loadmaster)
- Capacity:
  - 33–55 troops or
  - 24 stretchers and 3 attendants or
  - 24,000 lb (10,886 kg) payload
- Length: 98 ft 10.7 in (30.142 m)
- Fuselage length: 51 ft 2 in (15.6 m)
- Width: 12 ft 5 in (3.78 m) (fuselage)
- Height: 18 ft 7.8 in (5.685 m)
- Empty weight: 24,578 lb (11,148 kg)
- Gross weight: 54,000 lb (24,494 kg)
- Fuel capacity: 1,080 US gal (899 imp gal; 4,088 L)
- Powerplant: 2 × Lycoming T55-GA-714A turboshaft engines, 4,733 shp (3,529 kW) each
- Main rotor diameter: 2 × 60 ft (18 m)
- Main rotor area: 5,600 sq ft (520 m^{2})
- Blade section: root: Boeing VR-7; tip: Boeing VR-8

Performance

- Maximum speed: 170 kn (200 mph, 310 km/h)
- Cruise speed: 157 kn (181 mph, 291 km/h)
- Range: 400 nmi (460 mi, 740 km)
- Combat range: 165 nmi (190 mi, 306 km) (combat radius)
- Ferry range: 1,216 nmi (1,399 mi, 2,252 km)
- Service ceiling: 20,000 ft (6,100 m)
- Rate of climb: 1,522 ft/min (7.73 m/s)
- Disk loading: 9.5 lb/sq ft (46 kg/m^{2})
- Power/mass: 0.28 hp/lb (0.46 kW/kg)

Armament

- Up to 3 pintle-mounted medium machine guns (1 on loading ramp and 2 at shoulder windows), generally 7.62 mm (0.300 in) M240/FN MAG machine guns, and can be armed with the 7.62 mm M134 Minigun rotary machine gun.

Avionics

- Rockwell Collins Common Avionics Architecture System (CAAS) (MH-47G/CH-47F)

== See also ==
- 17th Aviation Brigade (United States)
- United States Army Aviation and Missile Command

Related development

- Boeing Vertol CH-46 Sea Knight
- Boeing Chinook (UK variants)
- Boeing Vertol BV-347

Aircraft of comparable role, configuration, and era

- Mil Mi-6
- Mil Mi-26
- Sikorsky CH-53 Sea Stallion
- Sikorsky CH-54 Tarhe/Sikorsky S-64 Skycrane
- Yakovlev Yak-24

Related lists

- List of active United States military aircraft
- List of aviation shootdowns and accidents during the Iraq War
- List of military electronics of the United States
