= Sky crane =

Sky crane or skycrane may refer to:

- A type of aerial crane helicopter pioneered by Sikorsky in 1950s and 1960s where the fuselage is only large enough to accommodate the pilot and crew and does not have a cargo hold or passenger area. Examples include S-64 Skycrane, S-60 and CH-54 Tarhe.
- Sikorsky S-64 Skycrane, an American twin-engine heavy-lift helicopter
- Sky crane (landing system), soft landing system used for Curiosity and Perseverance Mars rovers

== See also ==
- Aerial crane
