= List of surviving Sikorsky CH-54s =

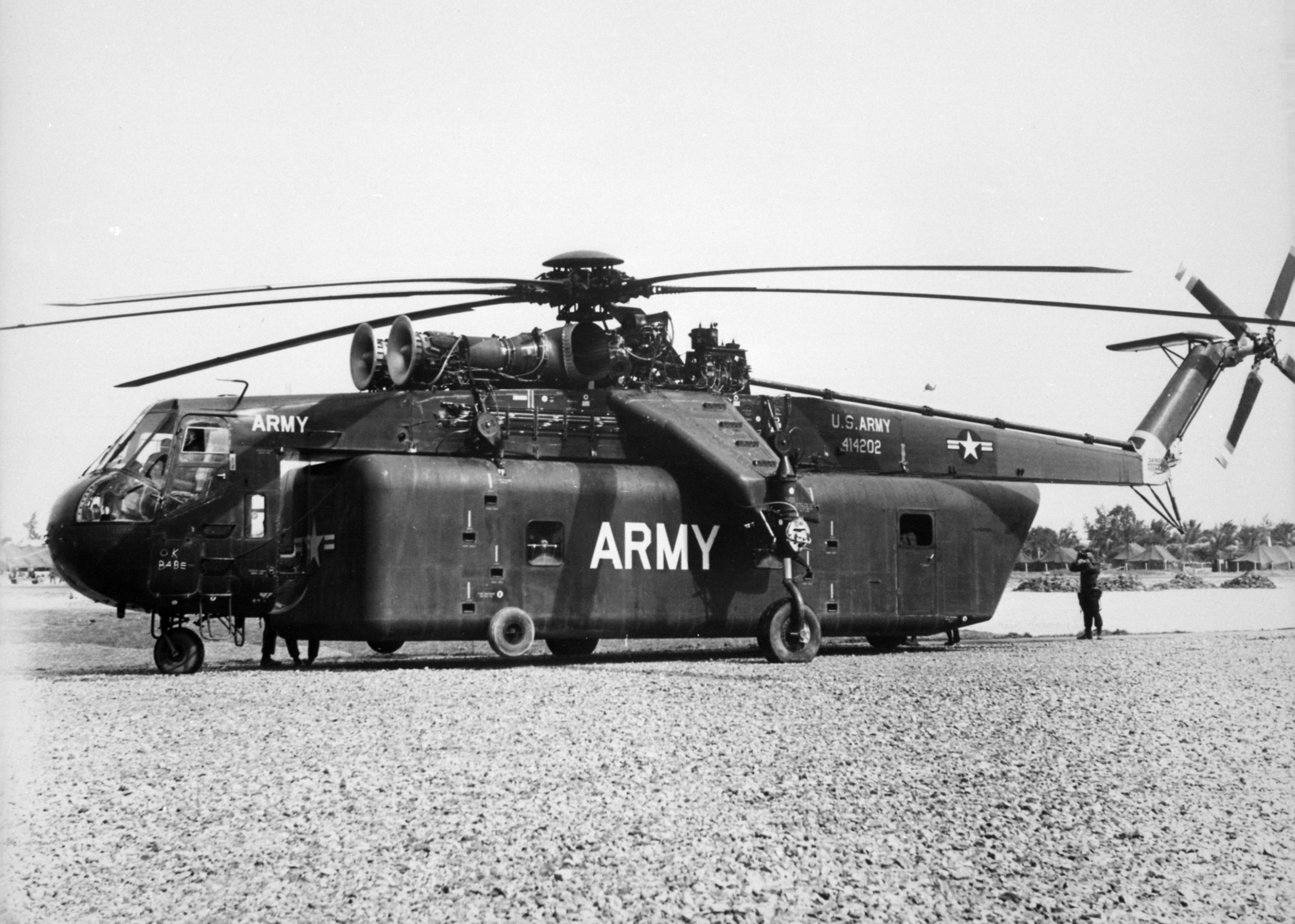
YCH-54A Tarhe with module

The Sikorsky CH-54 Tarhe is a twin-engine heavy-lift helicopter designed by Sikorsky Aircraft for the United States Army. The civil version is the Sikorsky S-64 Skycrane. The Army purchased 105 CH-54s before its discontinuation. The S-64 Aircrane is still in production. There are currently numerous complete and partial airframes in existence for this aircraft. Some CH-54's and some S-64's (both E and F models) are owned, and have been remanufactured, by Erickson Air-Crane Inc.

== Airworthy ==
CH-54A

- 67-18427 – N793HT operated by Helicopter Transport Services in Aurora, Oregon.
- 67-18429 – N429C privately owned in Yuba City, California.
- 67-18430 – N7095B operated by Siller Helicopter in Yuba City, California.
- 68-18447 – N792HT operated by Helicopter Transport Services in Aurora, Oregon.
- 68-18455 – N9125M operated by Siller Helicopter in Yuba City, California.
- 68-18458 – N795HT operated by Helicopter Transport Services in Aurora, Oregon.

CH-54B

- 69-18463 – N720HT operated by Helicopter Transport Services in Aurora, Oregon.
- 69-18466 – N721HT operated by Helicopter Transport Services in Aurora, Oregon.
- 69-18467 – N718HT operated by Helicopter Transport Services in Aurora, Oregon.
- 69-18468 – N722HT operated by Helicopter Transport Services in Aurora, Oregon.
- 69-18469 – N719HT privately owned in Wilmington, Delaware.
- 69-18470 – N715HT operated by Helicopter Transport Services in Aurora, Oregon.
- 69-18484 – N716HT operated by Helicopter Transport Services in Aurora, Oregon.

== On display ==
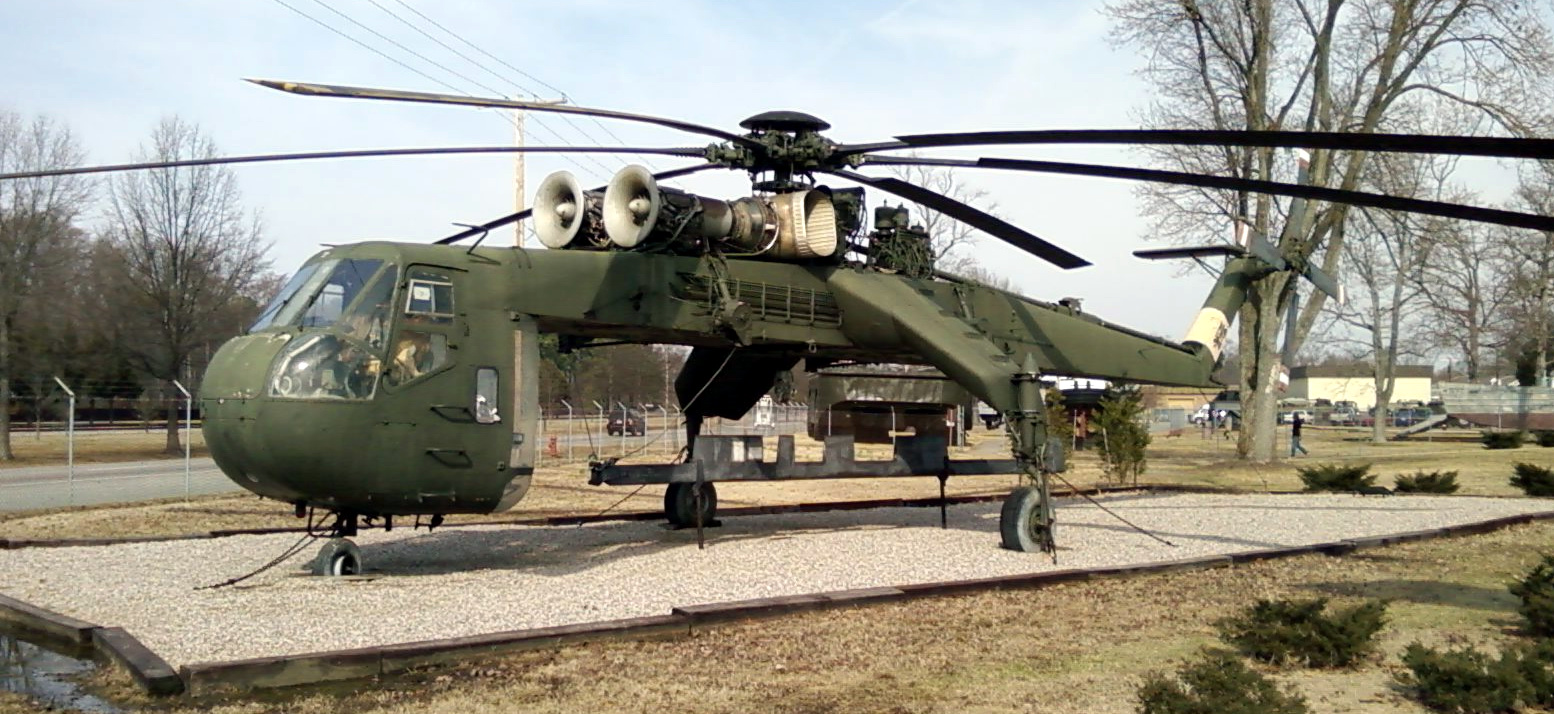
Skycrane on display at the United States Army Transportation Museum in Virginia, USA

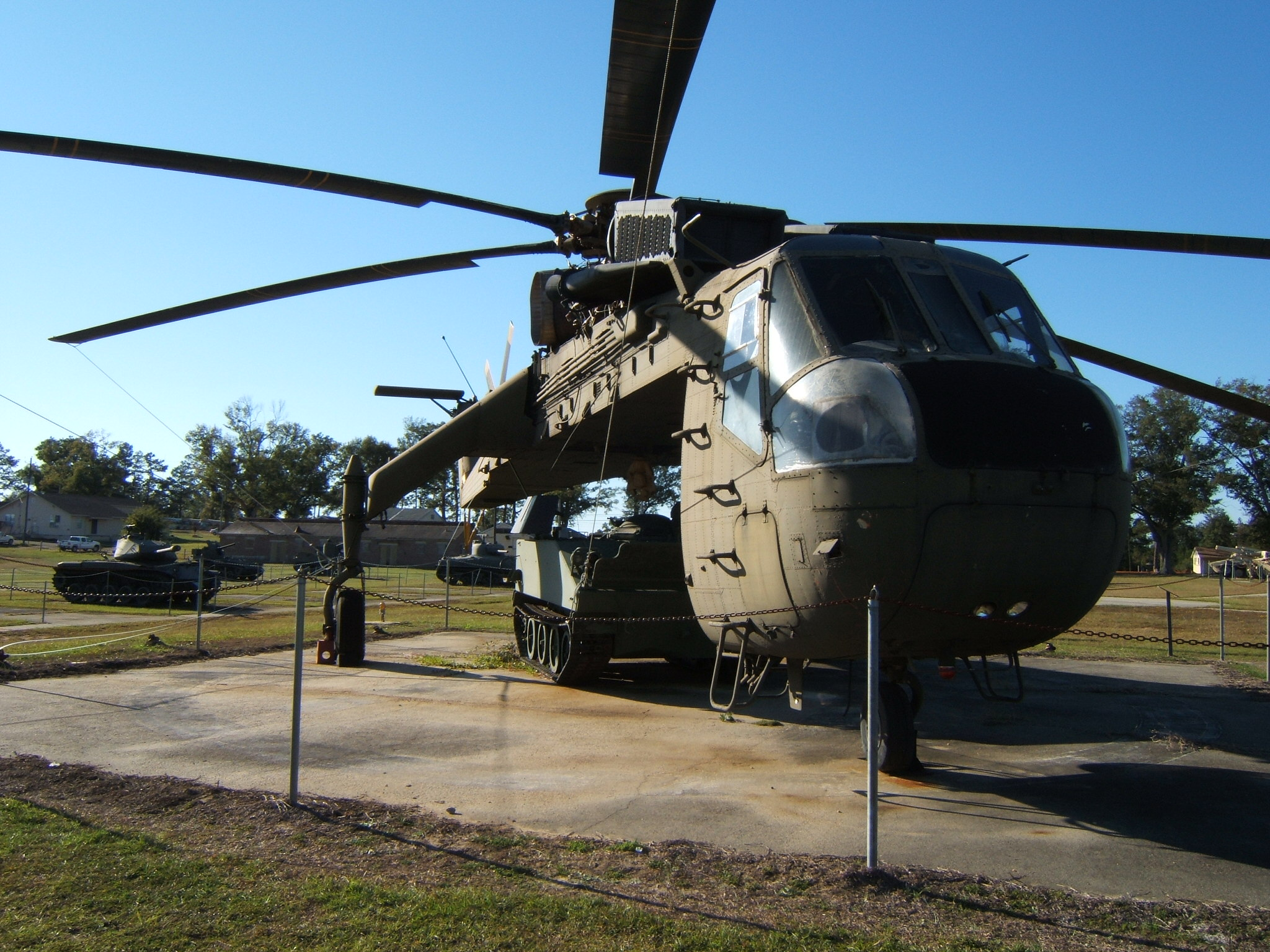
CH-54 Tarhe on display

YCH-54A

- 64-14203 – United States Army Transportation Museum at Fort Eustis near Newport News, Virginia.

CH-54A

- 66-18409 – 1st Cavalry Division Museum at Fort Hood in Killeen, Texas.
- 67-18418 – Stead Army National Guard Base in Reno, Nevada.
- 67-18424 – Combat Air Museum in Topeka, Kansas.
- 68-18437 – Pima Air & Space Museum in Tucson, Arizona.
- 68-18438 – United States Army Aviation Museum at Fort Rucker near Daleville, Alabama.
- 68-18439 – Museum of the Kansas National Guard in Topeka, Kansas.

CH-54B

- 68-18434 – Mississippi Armed Forces Museum at Camp Shelby near Hattiesburg, Mississippi.
- 69-18464 - Southern Museum of Flight in Birmingham, Alabama.
- 69-18465 – New England Air Museum in Windsor Locks, Connecticut.
- 69-18479 – Birmingham Air National Guard Base in Birmingham, Alabama.
- 70-18486 – Russell Military Museum in Zion, Illinois.
- 70-18488 Isabell – Camp Denali at Joint Base Elmendorf–Richardson in Anchorage, Alaska.
