= S73 =

S73 may refer to:

== Aircraft ==
- Bernard S-73, a French racing monoplane
- Savoia-Marchetti S.73, an Italian airliner
- Sikorsky S-73, an American helicopter proposal

== Submarines ==
- HMCS Onondaga (S73), of the Royal Canadian Navy
- INS Arihant (S73), of the Indian Navy
- INS Rachav (S73), of the Israeli Navy

== Other uses ==
- County Route S73 (Bergen County, New Jersey)
- S73, a postcode district for Barnsley, England
