= Sikorsky S-73 =

Proposed heavy-lift helicopter

S-73 HLH

General information
- Type: Heavy-lift cargo helicopter
- National origin: United States
- Manufacturer: Sikorsky Aircraft

History
- Developed from: CH-54 Tarhe

The Sikorsky S-73 was a proposed aircraft design to meet the United States Army requirement in 1970 for a Heavy Lift Helicopter (HLH) capable of carrying 45,000 lb (20,000 kg; 20 t), a lifting capacity more than twice that of Sikorsky's most powerful helicopter at that time.

The Sikorsky's S-73 design was an enlarged version of the successful CH-54/S-64 with a simplified and improved single main rotor powered by three General Electric TF34-58 turboshaft engines rated at a combined 21,000 hp (15,660 kW). A crew of five would operate the aircraft from the forward cockpit with pushbuttons replacing the traditional cyclic stick and collective lever. Behind the cockpit an aft cabin provided capacity for 12 combat troops.

Sikorsky submitted their design in February 1971, then in May the Army declared the Boeing Vertol XCH-62 winner of the contract, ending the Sikorsky S-73 program.

== Specifications ==
Data from Sikorsky Archives

General characteristics

- Crew: five
- Capacity: 12 combat troops or 45,000 lb (20,000 kg) max payload
- Length: 110 ft 0 in (33.54 m)
- Height: 31 ft (9.4 m)
- Empty weight: 59,000 lb (26,762 kg)
- Max takeoff weight: 118,000 lb (53,524 kg)
- Powerplant: 3 × General Electric TF34-58 turboshaft, 7,000 shp (5,200 kW) each
- Main rotor diameter: 124 ft 0 in (37.8 m)
- Main rotor area: 2,801 sq ft (260.2 m^{2}) 4-bladed composite construction

== See also ==
- Aerial crane

Related development

- Sikorsky CH-54 Tarhe
- Sikorsky S-64 Skycrane

Aircraft of comparable role, configuration, and era

- Boeing Vertol XCH-62
- Mil Mi-10

Related lists

- List of helicopters
