= Sikorsky CH-54 Tarhe =

American twin-engine heavy-lift helicopter

CH-54 Tarhe
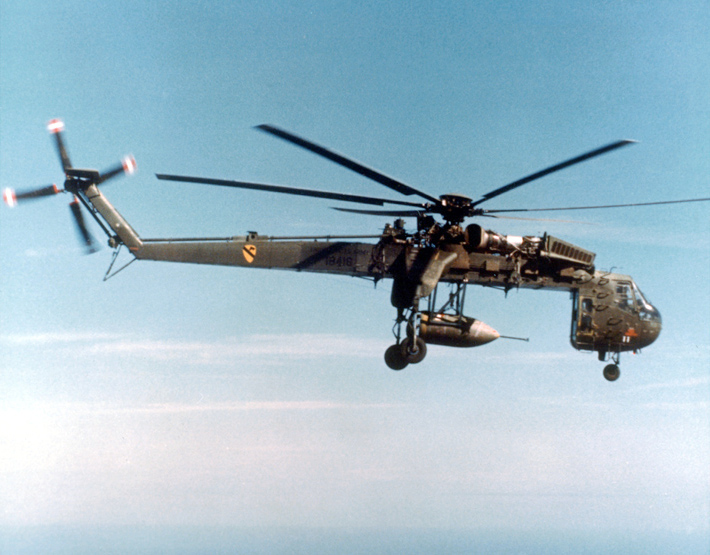
- A CH-54A carrying a "Daisy Cutter" parachute bomb

General information
- Type: Heavy-lift cargo helicopter
- Manufacturer: Sikorsky Aircraft Erickson (1992-)
- Status: Retired
- Primary user: United States Army
- Number built: 105

History
- First flight: 9 May 1962
- Retired: 1970s (US Army); 1993 (National Guard)
- Variant: S-64 Skycrane

The Sikorsky CH-54 Tarhe is an American twin-engine heavy-lift helicopter designed by Sikorsky Aircraft for the United States Army. It is named after Tarhe, an 18th-century chief of the Wyandot Indian tribe whose nickname was "The Crane". The civilian version is the Sikorsky S-64 Skycrane.

== Development ==
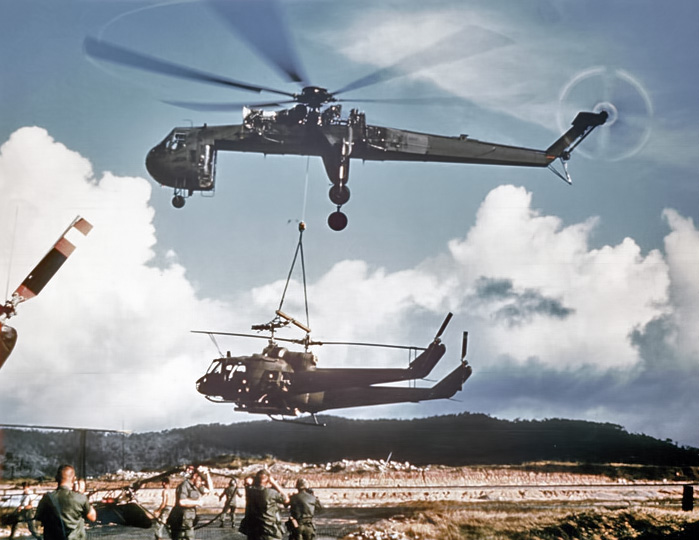
A CH-54A Tarhe carrying a pair of UH-1 Huey utility helicopters

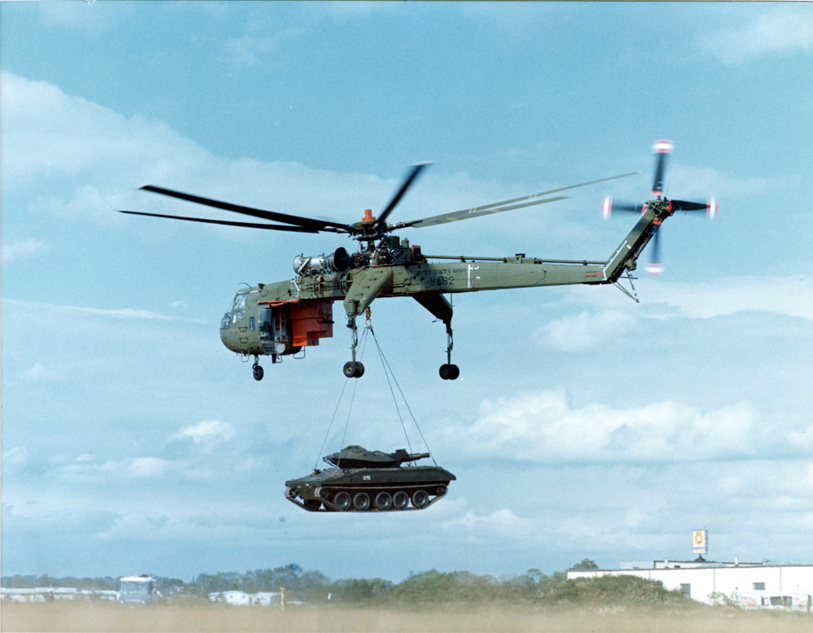
CH-54B carrying an M551 Sheridan tank, Redstone Arsenal, Alabama

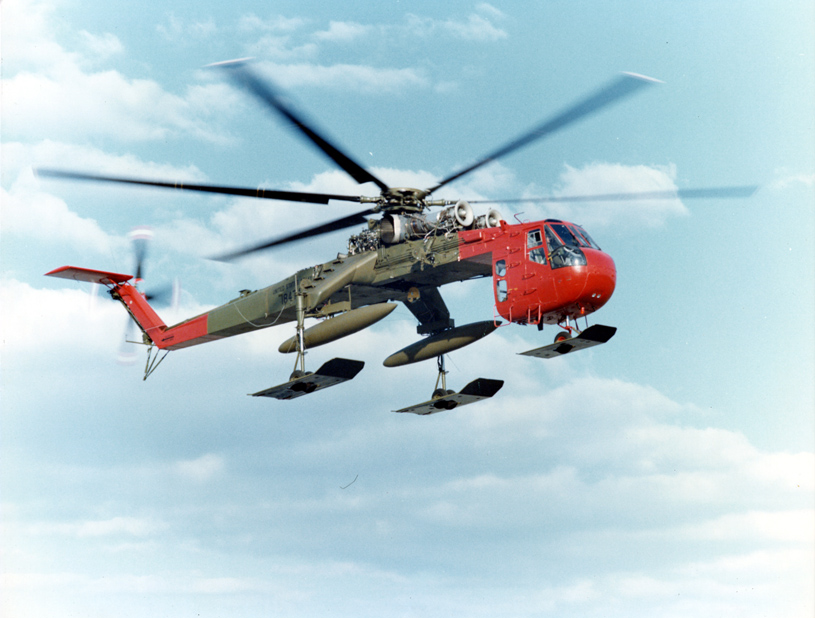
Sikorsky Skycrane CH-54B with landing gear modified for soft ground.

Work on what would become the CH-54 can be traced back to Sikorsky's earlier activities with "sky-crane" helicopters, particularly the piston-engined Sikorsky S-60 of the late 1950s. Following the end of the Korean War, the United States Army sought to procure a successor to the Sikorsky CH-37 Mojave, an early piston-engined heavy lift helicopter; being aware of this need, Sikorsky were keen to fulfill it. The company was already working on the Sikorsky S-64 Skycrane, a civil-orientated heavy lift rotorcraft that was designed specifically for the purpose of carrying large payloads externally; the development of a military-configured derivative was viewed as a natural option. While Sikorsky were quick to recognise the advantages of adopting turboshaft propulsion, there were no suitable engines of that type initially available, thus it had to work with the American engine manufacturer Pratt and Whitney to modify their JT12 turbojet to produce one.

One innovative feature for any helicopter of the era was the incorporation of an automatic flight control system, effectively a fly-by-wire arrangement. This feature enabled the aft-facing crew member to control the rotorcraft's pitch, roll, and yaw with 10% control authority, along with an altitude-hold function; it was also praised for being relatively easy to fly under instrument flight rules (IFR). Considerable attention was paid to the fuselage's design, particularly to minimising weight and maintenance requirements. The landing gear was designed to kneel to make loading easier as well as to ease operations from sloped surfaces. From the onset, Sikorsky sought to enable the type to carry as diverse a range of cargoes as possible, leading to the incorporation of fitting for the carriage of barges and of a specially designed multipurpose "people pod" that was suited for use for personnel transport, paratroop operations, and even as a mobile hospital or mobile command post.

On 9 May 1962, the first of three prototypes performed its maiden flight. It was subsequently tested by the US Army at Fort Benning while the other two underwent an evaluation in West Germany. During June 1963, it was announced that the US Army had placed an order for an initial six helicopters, designating it as the CH-54A; the first of these was officially accepted on 30 June 1963. Following a relatively brief period of testing and evaluation, the CH-54 was quickly put into active use in Vietnam.

Early on, the type had demonstrated itself to possess unrivalled performance in some aspects. As of 2014, it continues to hold the helicopter record for highest altitude in level flight at 11,000 m (36,000 ft), which it set in 1971, as well at the fastest climb to 3,000, 6,000, and 9,000 m (10,000, 20,000, and 30,000 ft). On 20 April 1965, a CH-54A equipped with a people pod lifted 90 people, comprising its crew of 3 and 87 combat-equipped troops; this was the largest number of people to be lifted by a single helicopter at that time.

== Operational history ==
The United States Army would ultimately procure 105 examples, which it operated under the designation of CH-54 Tarhe. It was most prolifically used during the Vietnam War, typically to provide logistical support and heavy transport activities in aid of American ground troops. In the theater, CH-54s would routinely be used to reposition artillery pieces such as the M101 howitzer, and even airlift bulky payloads such as bulldozers and patrol boats. In terms of retrieved aircraft alone, in excess of 380 were reportedly recovered via CH-54, resulting in the saving of several hundred million dollars.

In particular, those forces operating in and around the Demilitarized Zone (DMZ) between North Vietnam and South Vietnam were unable to rely on ground supply routes due to the unavoidable challenges posed by the local geography; instead, they were almost entirely dependent on air support provided by rotorcraft such as the CH-54. The type would operate so close to the frontlines that several would come under fire from the North Vietnamese. One unusual use of the type came under the Combat Trap programme, which saw it drop 10,000 lb bombs, intended for clearing landing zones. One danger that its crews had to maintain awareness of was the strong downwash generated by the rotors; nearby tents were particularly at risk of being blown away.

As a heavy transport helicopter, capable of retrieving numerous types of downed aircraft, it proved to be highly successful. The Tarhe can hold its cargo up and tight against its center spine to lessen drag and eliminate the pendulum effect when flying forward, as well as winch vehicles up and down from a hovering position, so the helicopter can deploy loads while hovering. Due to budget cuts, the Heavy Lift Helicopter (HLH) program was canceled and the CH-54 was not upgraded with larger engines. The relatively small fleet proved costly to maintain, thus the tandem-rotor Boeing CH-47 Chinook, a rival heavy lift helicopter, gradually supplemented the CH-54 for most transport duties, eventually replacing it in Regular Army aviation units during the 1980s. Another heavy lift helicopter, the Sikorsky CH-53 Sea Stallion, had also been developed using many of the proven systems of the CH-54, including its engine, fuselage, and dynamic systems.

The CH-54 was also operated by the Army National Guard, where it performed a variety of military and civilian missions. It participated in various humanitarian relief operations, including the rescuing of a whale in Alaska. Unusual payloads include whole antenna towers and log cabins; another example was the use of a CH-54 to airlift air conditioners onto the roof of the Pentagon. Furthermore, it was commonly tasked with relocating non-airworthy or retired aircraft. Despite these atypical demands, the CH-54 achieved a strong safety record. The military cutbacks enacted at the end of the Cold War proved to be the death knell for the CH-54's military service; the final National Guard flight was conducted on 10 January 1993.

Following their withdrawal from military use, many CH-54s were acquired by civilian operators and thus continued to be used in this new capacity. Of these, Erickson Air-Crane of Central Point, Oregon, operates the largest fleet of S-64 helicopters in the world under the name Erickson S-64 Aircrane. These can be equipped with water-dropping equipment (some also have foam/gel capability) for firefighting duties worldwide. After obtaining the type certificate and manufacturing rights in 1992, Erickson remains the manufacturer.

== Variants ==
YCH-54A
Preproduction aircraft, 6 built.
CH-54A
Production model powered by two 4,500 shp (3,400 kW) Pratt & Whitney T73-P-1 turboshafts, 54 built.
CH-54B
Heavier version of the CH-54A with two 4,800 shp (3,600 kW) T73-P-700 turboshafts and twin-wheeled main undercarriage, 37 ordered, 29 built.
S-64B
In 1968, Sikorsky proposed a three-engined growth version with upgraded rotor and gearbox. This was not proceeded with but did form the basis for the CH-53E Super Stallion.

== Operators ==
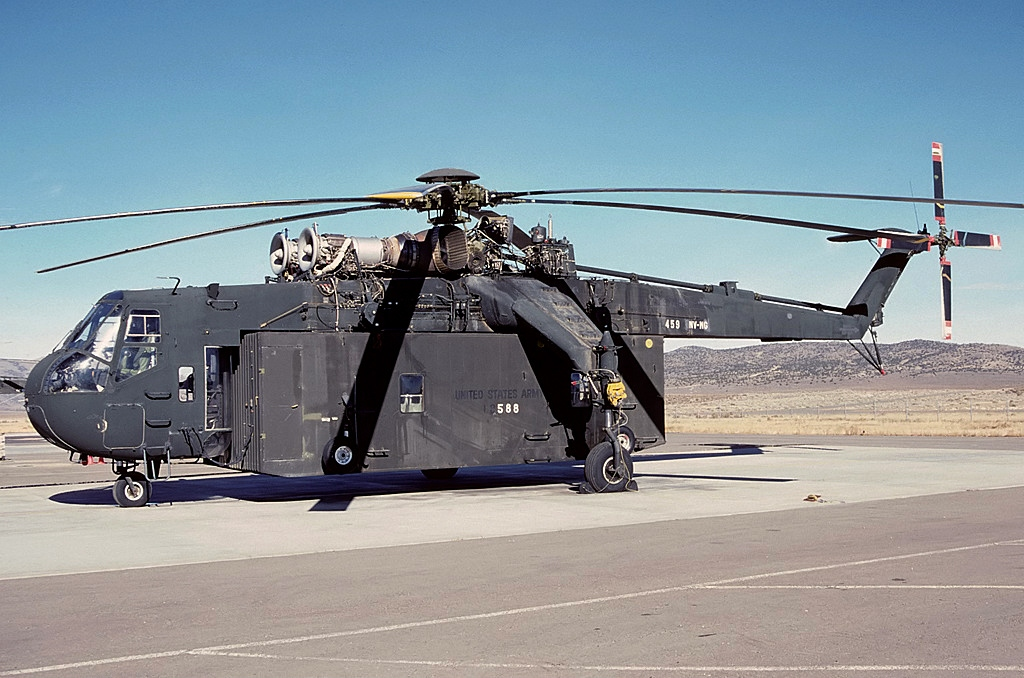
US Army CH-54A Tarhe (S-64A), 1989

United States

- NASA
- United States Army
  - 273rd Heavy Helicopter Company
  - 355th Heavy Helicopter Company
  - 478th Heavy Helicopter Company
  - 2nd Battalion, 291st Aviation Company
- United States Army Reserve
- Army National Guard
  - Company D, 113th Aviation, 152nd Airlift Wing, Nevada ARNG 1986–1993 (received CH-54A)
  - 1160 Aviation Company, Georgia ARNG (received CH-54A)
  - 137th Transportation Company (Heavy Helicopter), Kansas ARNG (received CH-54A)
  - Company E, 185th Aviation Brigade, Mississippi ARNG (received CH-54A)
  - Pennsylvania (received CH-54A)
  - Alaska (received CH-54B)
  - Alabama (received CH-54B)
  - Connecticut (received CH-54B)

== Surviving aircraft ==
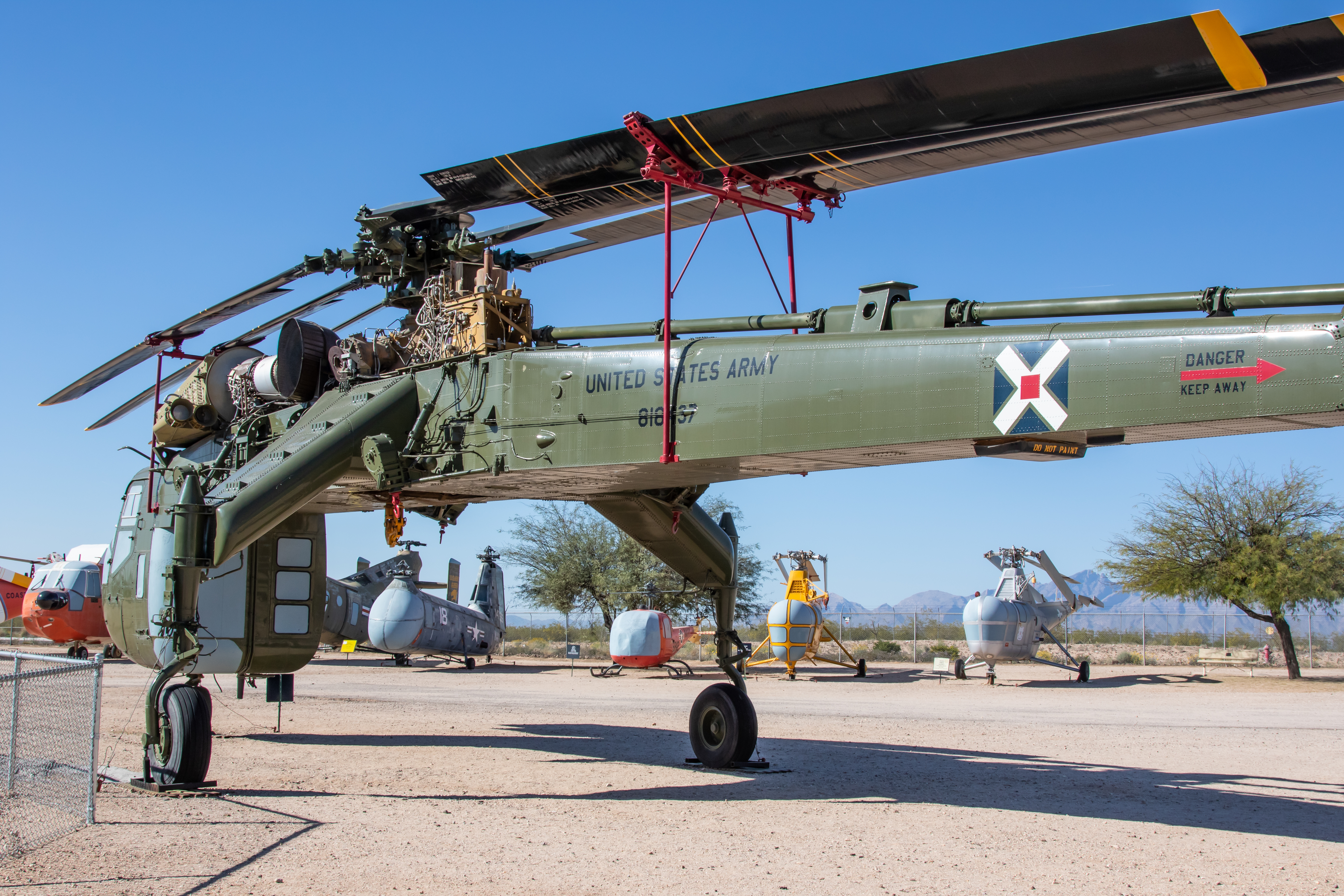
CH-54A Tarhe ("Skycrane") on display

A large number of surviving airframes exist in flyable condition as well as in museum collections worldwide.

== Specifications (CH-54B) ==
Orthographically projected diagram of the Sikorsky CH-54B Tarhe.

General characteristics

- Crew: 3
- Capacity: 25,000 lb (11,340 kg) payload
- Length: 88 ft 6 in (26.97 m)
- Height: 25 ft 5 in (7.75 m)
- Empty weight: 19,800 lb (8,981 kg)
- Max takeoff weight: 47,000 lb (21,319 kg)
- Powerplant: 2 × Pratt & Whitney T73-P-700 turboshaft engines, 4,800 shp (3,600 kW) each
- Main rotor diameter: 72 ft 0 in (21.95 m)
- Main rotor area: 4,071.5 sq ft (378.25 m^{2}) * Blade section: – NACA 0011 mod

Performance

- Maximum speed: 130 kn (150 mph, 240 km/h)
- Cruise speed: 100 kn (120 mph, 190 km/h)
- Range: 200 nmi (230 mi, 370 km)
- Rate of climb: 1,330 ft/min (6.8 m/s)

== See also ==
- Aerial crane
- BLU-82
- Robert McNamara as Secretary of Defense § Sealift and amphibious warfare

Related development

- Sikorsky S-60
- Sikorsky S-64 Skycrane
- Sikorsky CH-53 Sea Stallion
- Sikorsky S-73

Aircraft of comparable role, configuration, and era

- Boeing CH-47 Chinook
- Boeing Vertol XCH-62
- Mil Mi-10

Related lists

- List of rotorcraft
- List of military aircraft of the United States
