= T73 =

T73 may refer to:

- Cooper T73, a racing car
- INS Cankarso (T73), a patrol vessel of the Indian Navy
- Pratt & Whitney T73, a turboshaft engine
