= Kitani =

Kitani is a surname. Notable people with the name include:

- Chigusa Kitani (1895–1947), Japanese Nihonga painter and painting teacher
- Doug Kitani, American executive, CEO of Erickson Inc
- Kosuke Kitani (born 1978), Japanese football player and manager
- Minoru Kitani (1909–1975), Go player and teacher
- Tatsuya Kitani (born 1996), Japanese musician, singer, lyricist, composer
- Teruhiko Kitani (born 1945), Japanese freestyle swimmer
- Tokuo Kitani (1909–1947), Japanese speed skater

== See also ==
- Kitani Mohabbat Hai (How Much I Love You), Indian soap opera on Imagine TV in 2009
