= Doug Kitani =

American executive

- Born: Douglas Lester Kitani
- Education: Emory University; United States Military Academy
- Occupation: CEO Erickson Inc.
- Term: September 2017–present

Doug Kitani is an American executive currently working as Chief Executive Officer (CEO) for aerospace manufacturing and aviation service provider Erickson Inc.

== Career ==
Kitani earned his BS degree from the U.S. Military Academy at West Point in 1993 and an MBA degree in finance from Goizueta Business School at Emory University. He completed 11 years of active and reserve service in the United States Army. He served as a helicopter pilot and officer qualified to fly Bell UH-1 Iroquois, OH-58 Kiowa Warrior, and Sikorsky UH-60 Black Hawk helicopters.

Following his service, Kitani went on to working in finance and private equity. He began his career at GE Capital, the finance division of General Electric. Following his time at GE Capital he was a Principal and Senior Direct Investment Professional of the Quadrant Capital Group. He moved on to hold investment banking positions at JP Morgan H&Q as well as SG Cowen. In 2003 he became Director of Alternative Investments at Fortune 500 company Honeywell International. He oversaw Honeywell's $23 billion pension fund and was responsible for the $1 billion alternative asset investment program. Following his time at Honeywell Kitani co-founded his own private equity firm, Calder Capital Partners, with backing from Allied Capital and Goldman Sachs.

After working at General Partner at Calder Capital Partners Kitani transitioned into the defense contractor and aerospace industry when he accepted a position to lead mergers and acquisitions at DynCorp International. Following that he spent a year as Executive Vice President and Chief Finance Officer at Aircraft Owners and Pilots Association (AOPA) before returning to DynCorp as Head of Portfolio Strategies for Aerospace and Defense. He went on to become CEO of IAP Worldwide Services.

In 2017 Kitani became CEO of Erickson Inc. Erickson then began a partnership with Ramco Aviation software to improve their MRO operations and delivered two newly manufactured S-64 Air Crane helicopters to the Korea Forest Service. Also during Kitani's tenure Erickson announced a new line of Air Crane helicopters, the S-64F+, an agreement with Sikorsky focused on developing nighttime firefighting technology, and that the FAA had certified the designs for new composite main rotor blades.
