= Boeing Vertol BV-347 =

American experimental helicopter

BV-347
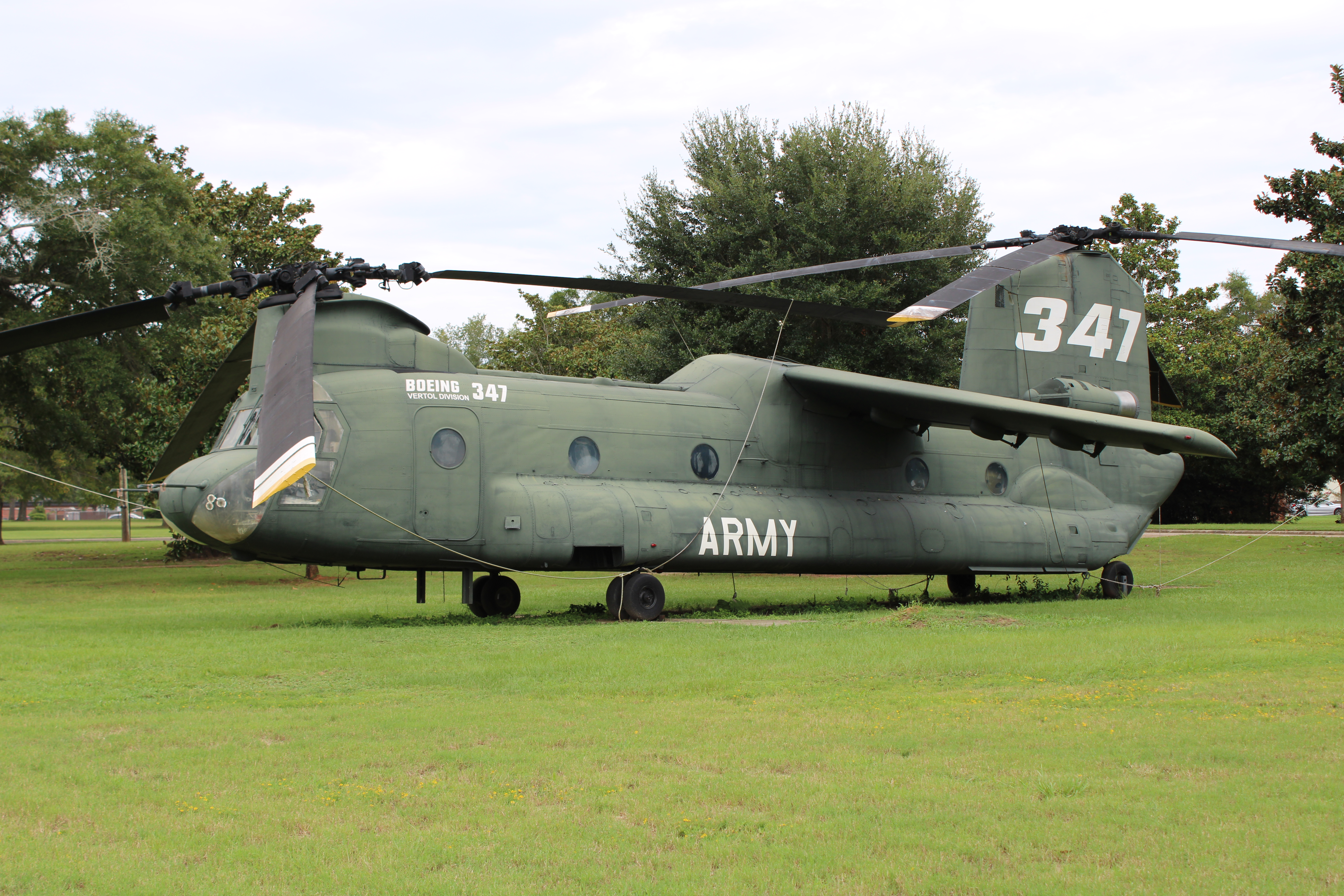
- BV-347 at the United States Army Aviation Museum

General information
- Type: Experimental helicopter
- National origin: United States
- Manufacturer: Boeing Vertol
- Number built: 1

History
- First flight: May 27, 1970
- Developed from: Boeing CH-47 Chinook

The Boeing Vertol BV-347 (also known as the Model 347) is an experimental helicopter built by Boeing Vertol from a converted CH-47A Chinook. It was used to test potential upgrades for the Chinook, several of which were later incorporated into subsequent versions of the CH-47.

== Design and development ==
Development of the BV-347 began in January 1969, when Boeing Vertol was contracted by the United States Army to develop an improved CH-47 Chinook. The Army loaned a single CH-47A, serial number 65-7992, to be modified in exchange for exclusive rights to the project's research data. The modifications, which were funded by Boeing, were carried out in two phases. Phase I began with redesigned rotors, which had four blades of increased diameter compared to the Chinook's three-blade rotors, as well as a 30-degree offset flapping hinge. The fuselage was stretched by 110 inches (280 cm), reducing the rotor overlap from 35% on the original Chinook to 22%, and provisions were added to mount small wings to the upper fuselage at a later time. The rear pylon was raised 30 inches (76 cm) to increase rotor clearance and decrease noise. The engines were replaced with uprated T55-L-11s, which would later be standard on the CH-47C. The cockpit layout was improved, with thicker glass being added, as well as a bulkhead with an entrance door and other improvements to reduce cockpit noise.

For Phase II, a pair of small wings was added to the fuselage. These wings served to provide extra lift and allowed the BV-347 to achieve a 60 degree banked turn. They had a variable incidence from 10 degrees down to 85 degrees up, and featured full-span flaps. During hover, the wings would be tilted to 85 degrees to minimize interference with the rotor downwash.

== Operational history ==
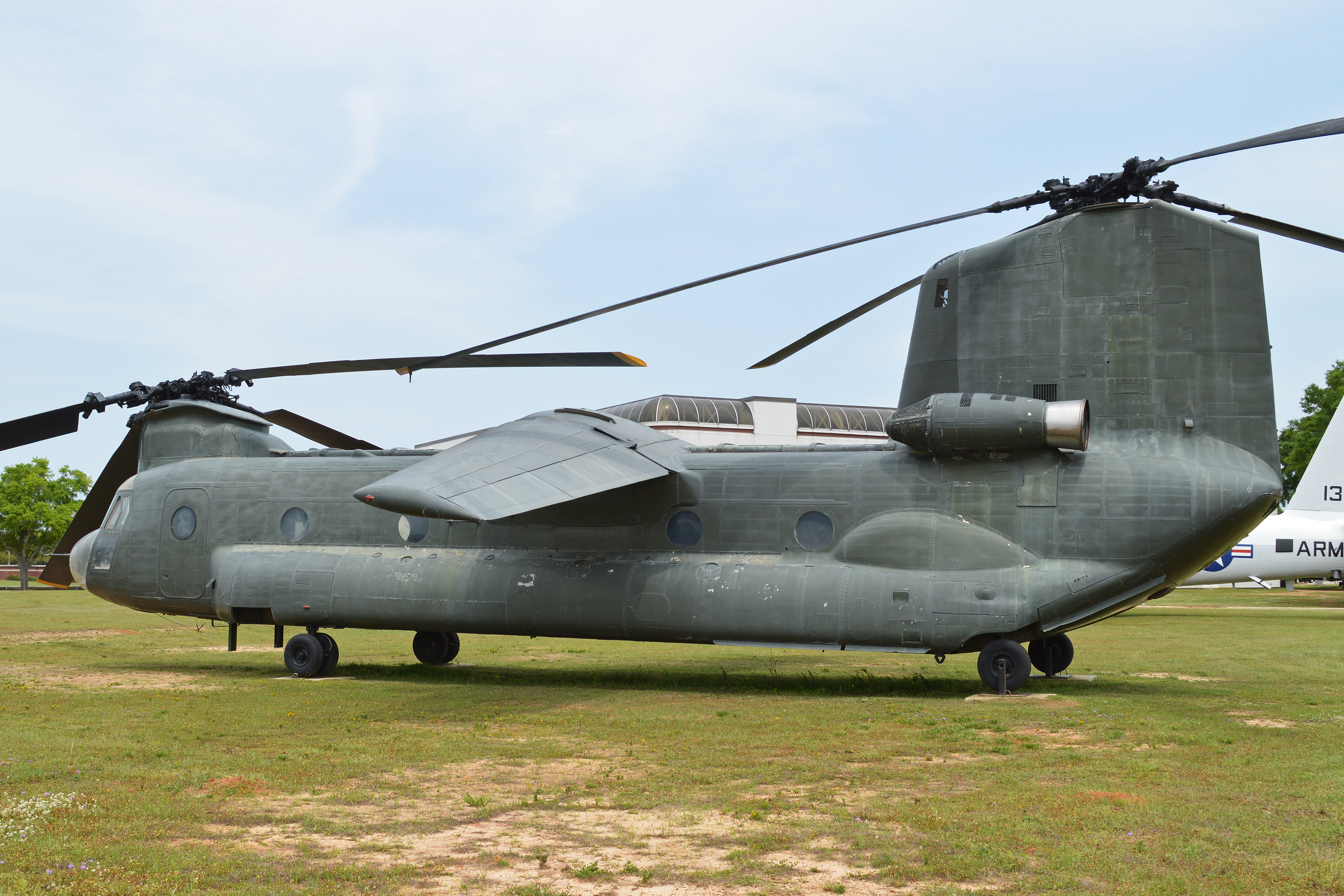
BV-347 at the US Army Aviation Museum in Fort Rucker in Alabama, 2013

The BV-347 made its first flight in Phase I configuration on May 27, 1970. During Phase I test flights, the BV-347 demonstrated a transmission-limited maximum true airspeed of 177 knots (204 mph; 328 km/h), excellent stability and flight characteristics, and low vibration and sound levels. Flight testing of the Phase II configuration began in December 1971.

Boeing Vertol used the BV-347 as part of the development of its XCH-62. As part of the program, the BV-347's hydro-mechanical rotor control system was replaced with a fly-by-wire system, becoming the first helicopter in history to be controlled with such a system. The BV-347 was also fitted with a retractable ventral gondola, with its own set of controls, which was used to operate the load recovery system. A sidearm controller originally developed for the XCH-62 was installed in the gondola. The new control system was noted to be easy for novice pilots to fly. During demonstrations in Washington DC, the BV-347 was flown by over 125 pilots, 100 of which had never flown an aircraft of any kind before, with some even being capable of performing normally difficult maneuvers.

Flight testing of the BV-347 was completed in 1975. Although the Army could not feasibly upgrade its entire CH-47 fleet with the stretched fuselage and wings of the BV-347, the latter did influence some of the improvements made to the CH-47D, such as the flight control systems and reliability improvements.

== Variants ==
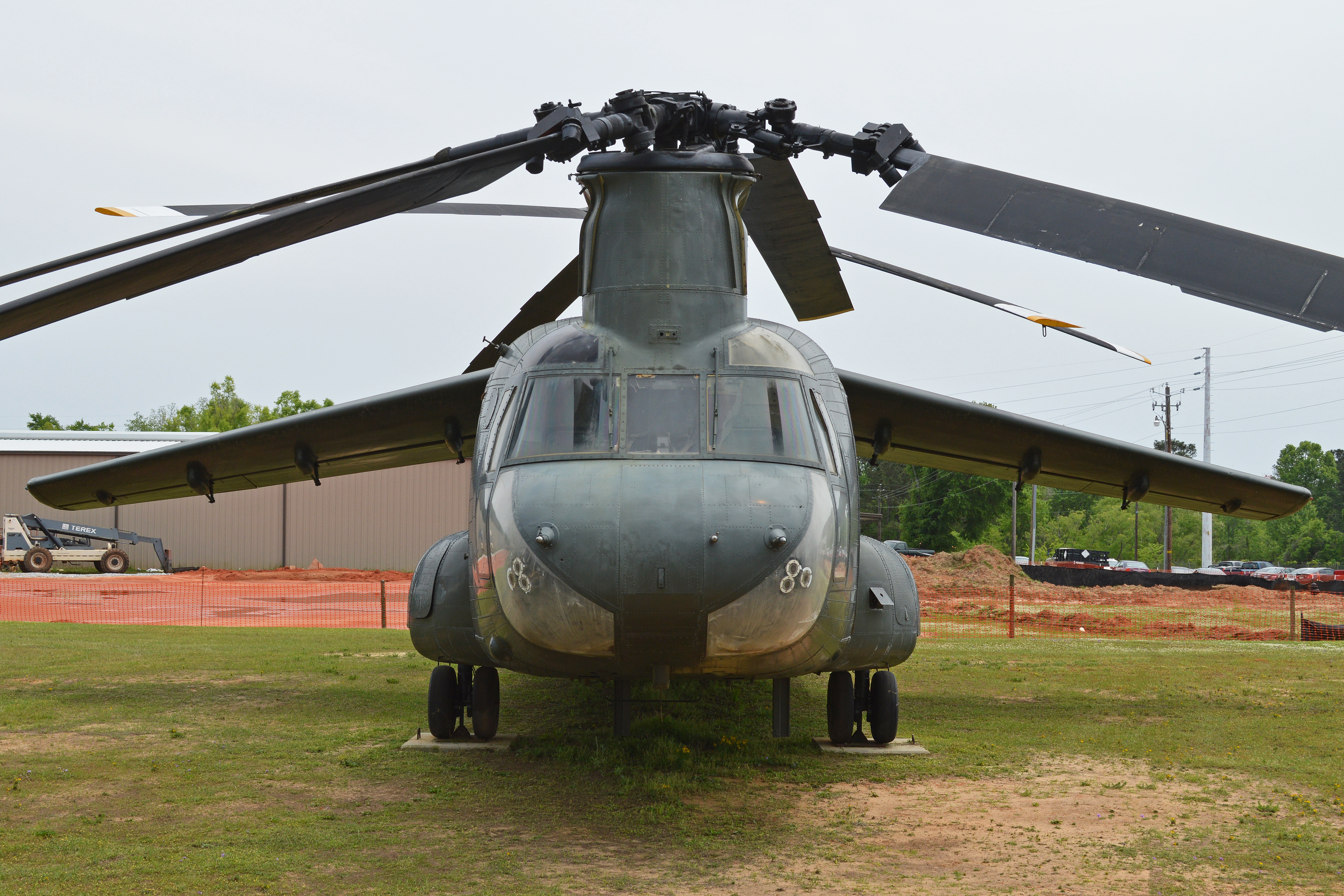
Head on view of a BV-347

BV-347 Phase I
Original configuration with stretched fuselage.

BV-347 Phase II
Fitted with small wings on the mid-fuselage.

Civil BV-347
A civil variant of the BV-347 considered by NASA.

== Aircraft on display ==
Following the completion of the test program, the sole BV-347 was retired and donated to the United States Army Aviation Museum at Fort Rucker in Alabama.

== Specifications (BV-347, Phase II) ==
Data from

General characteristics

- Wingspan: 45 ft (14 m)
- Wing area: 340 sq ft (32 m^{2})
- Powerplant: 2 × Lycoming T55-L-11 turboshaft engine
- Main rotor diameter: 2 × 60 ft 0 in (18.29 m)

== See also ==
Related development

- Boeing CH-47 Chinook
- Boeing Vertol XCH-62

Aircraft of comparable role, configuration, and era

- Kamov V-100
- Lockheed AH-56 Cheyenne
- Piasecki 16H Pathfinder
- Sikorsky S-67 Blackhawk
