= Sikorsky S-60 =

Prototype "flying crane" helicopter

S-60
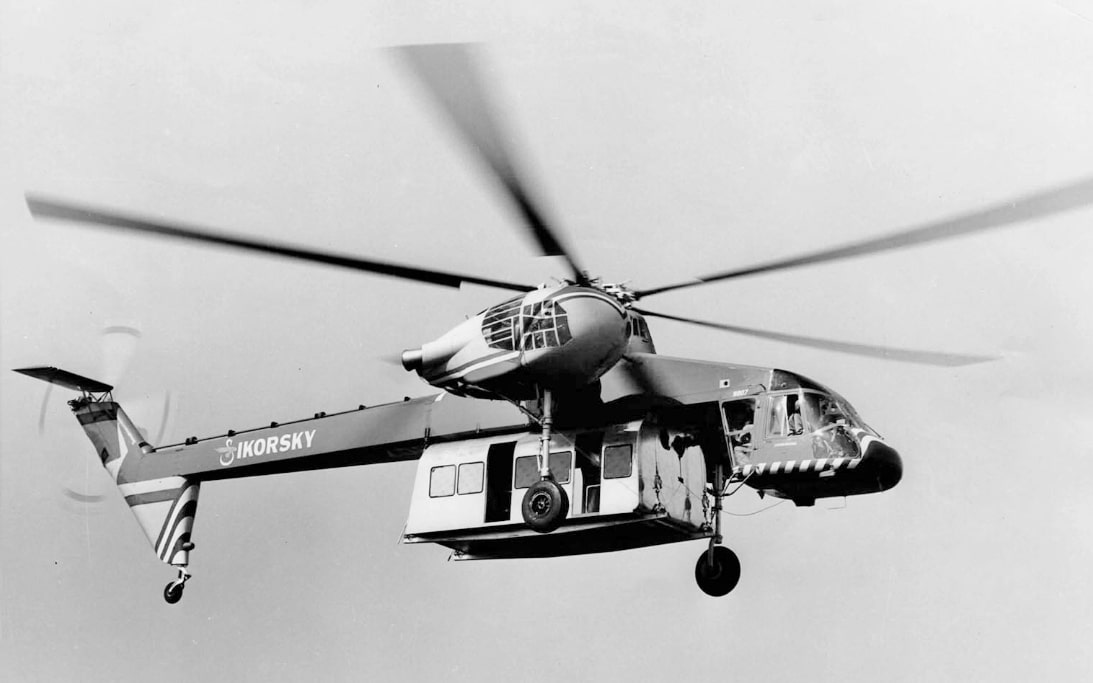
- The Sikorsky S-60

General information
- Type: Cargo helicopter
- Manufacturer: Sikorsky Aircraft
- Status: Under restoration (2025)
- Number built: 1

History
- First flight: 25 March 1959
- Developed from: Sikorsky CH-37 Mojave
- Developed into: Sikorsky S-64 Skycrane

The Sikorsky S-60 is a prototype flying crane helicopter derived from the S-56. Proving to be underpowered, the development of the S-60 led to the larger, turbine-engined Sikorsky CH-54 Tarhe military transport helicopter, and its civil S-64 Skycrane variant, which were already on the drawing board by the time the sole example of the S-60 crashed on 3 April 1961.

Like the S-56/H-37 it was powered by two Wasp radial piston engines, but it had a radically different fuselage; rather than a fixed cabin it only had a cockpit and an open area in which pods with different tasks could be carried. Although it did not enter service, it was evaluated by the U.S. Army and Navy, and led to further development of this concept.

== Design and development ==
In 1958, Sikorsky began designing the S-60 as a prototype "flying crane" helicopter. The S-60 utilized the transmission, rotor system and piston engines from the CH-37/S-56.

The fuselage of the S-60 was a simple "pod-and-boom" design with the engines mounted in side pods and long tailwheel-style landing gear that allowed it to straddle cargoes. The crew cabin was mounted in the nose, with aft-mounted controls for the co-pilot to use during loading and unloading operations. The S-60 had an automatic stabilization system to allow it to hover precisely, using inputs from a sidestick controller. Up to 12,000 pounds (5,400 kg) of outsized cargo such as vehicles could be slung beneath the boom, while passengers and other cargo could be carried in a large interchangeable pod that attached to the fuselage.

== Operational history ==
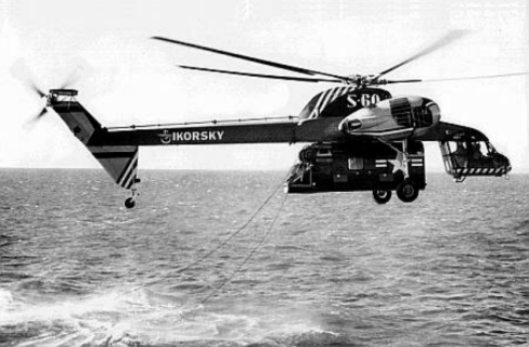
S-60 with mine-sweeping equipment

The S-60 (registered N807) first flew on March 25, 1959. The helicopter accumulated 333 hours of flight in its two-year flight career, and was evaluated by the US Navy, with demonstrations also flown for the US Army. While effective in its designed role, the helicopter proved to be underpowered. Sikorsky was already working on an enlarged, turboshaft-powered successor, the Model S-64, which was ordered into production for the US Army as the Sikorsky CH-54 Tarhe.

Igor Sikorsky was fully involved in the development of the prototype S-60, from the initial design through flight testing. It was one of the last aircraft to have this distinction. The prototype crashed in April 1961.

== Survivor ==
The wreckage of the S-60 was transferred to the New England Air Museum in the 1970s, and is currently being restored by its new owners, the Connecticut Air and Space Center, in Stratford, Connecticut.

== Specifications (S-60) ==
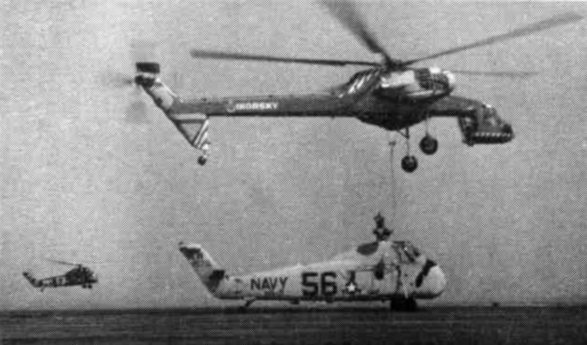
The S-60 after lifting a damaged HSS-1 to NAS Quonset Point, 1960.

Data from The Complete Encyclopedia of World Aircraft

General characteristics

- Crew: 3
- Capacity: 12,000 lb (5,443 kg) payload
- Length: 87 ft 11 in (26.80 m)
- Max takeoff weight: 21,000 lb (9,525 kg)
- Powerplant: 2 × Pratt & Whitney R-2800-54 Double Wasp 18-cylinder air-cooled radial piston engines, 2,100 hp (1,600 kW) each
- Main rotor diameter: 72 ft 1 in (21.97 m)
- Main rotor area: 4,080 sq ft (379 m^{2})

Performance

- Maximum speed: 131 mph (211 km/h, 114 kn)
- Range: 247 mi (398 km, 215 nmi)
- Service ceiling: 8,000 ft (2,400 m)

== See also ==
- Aerial crane
- Sikorsky UH-60 (Sikorsky S-70)

Related development

- Sikorsky CH-37 Mojave
- Sikorsky CH-54 Tarhe
- Sikorsky S-64 Skycrane

Aircraft of comparable role, configuration, and era

- Mil Mi-10

Related lists

- List of military aircraft of the United States
