= Lockheed XV-4 Hummingbird =

American experimental VTOL aircraft

XV-4 Hummingbird
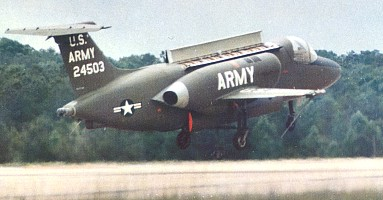
- First prototype XV-4 Hummingbird

General information
- Type: VTOL
- National origin: United States
- Manufacturer: Lockheed
- Status: Both aircraft destroyed during testing
- Primary user: United States Army
- Number built: 2

History
- First flight: 7 July 1962

The Lockheed XV-4 Hummingbird (originally designated VZ-10) was a U.S. Army project to demonstrate the feasibility of using VTOL for a surveillance aircraft carrying target-acquisition and sensory equipment. It was designed and built by the Lockheed Corporation in the 1960s, as one of many attempts to produce a V/STOL (vertical take-off/landing) jet. Both prototype aircraft were destroyed in accidents.

== Design and development ==
Vertical take-off lift was obtained by exhausting the engine flow downward through multiple nozzles, augmented by a secondary flow of cold air. But the performance was far below estimates with only a 1.04 thrust-to-weight ratio, and the prototype crashed on 10 June 1966, killing the pilot. The second aircraft was converted to lift jets instead, yet also crashed after several tests.

Rockwell's XFV-12 would be even less successful at producing lift by using engine exhaust to entrain cold air, in this case through flaps on the wings.

None of the early American V/STOL designs would result in a production aircraft. The British Hawker Siddeley Harrier used vectoring nozzles, while the Russian Yakovlev Yak-38 Forger attack jet used lift jets in conjunction with rotating rear nozzles. The Lockheed F-35 Lightning II would later employ a shaft-driven lift fan located in the fuselage.

== Testing ==
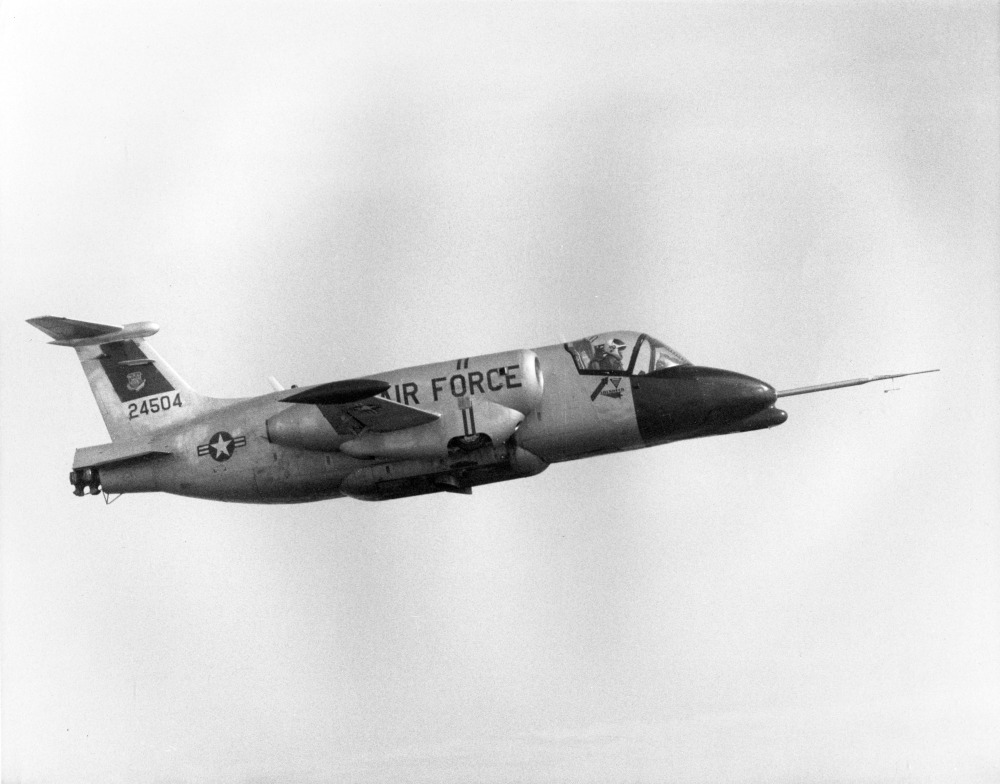
XV-4B

The first conventional takeoff flight of the first prototype, XV-4A (62–4503), took place on 7 July 1962. Initial tethered flight tests were carried out on 30 November 1962 with the first free hovering flight occurring on 24 May 1963. The first flight to transition from hovering to forward flight took place on 8 November 1963. 62–4503 was destroyed in a fatal crash in Cobb County on 10 June 1966.

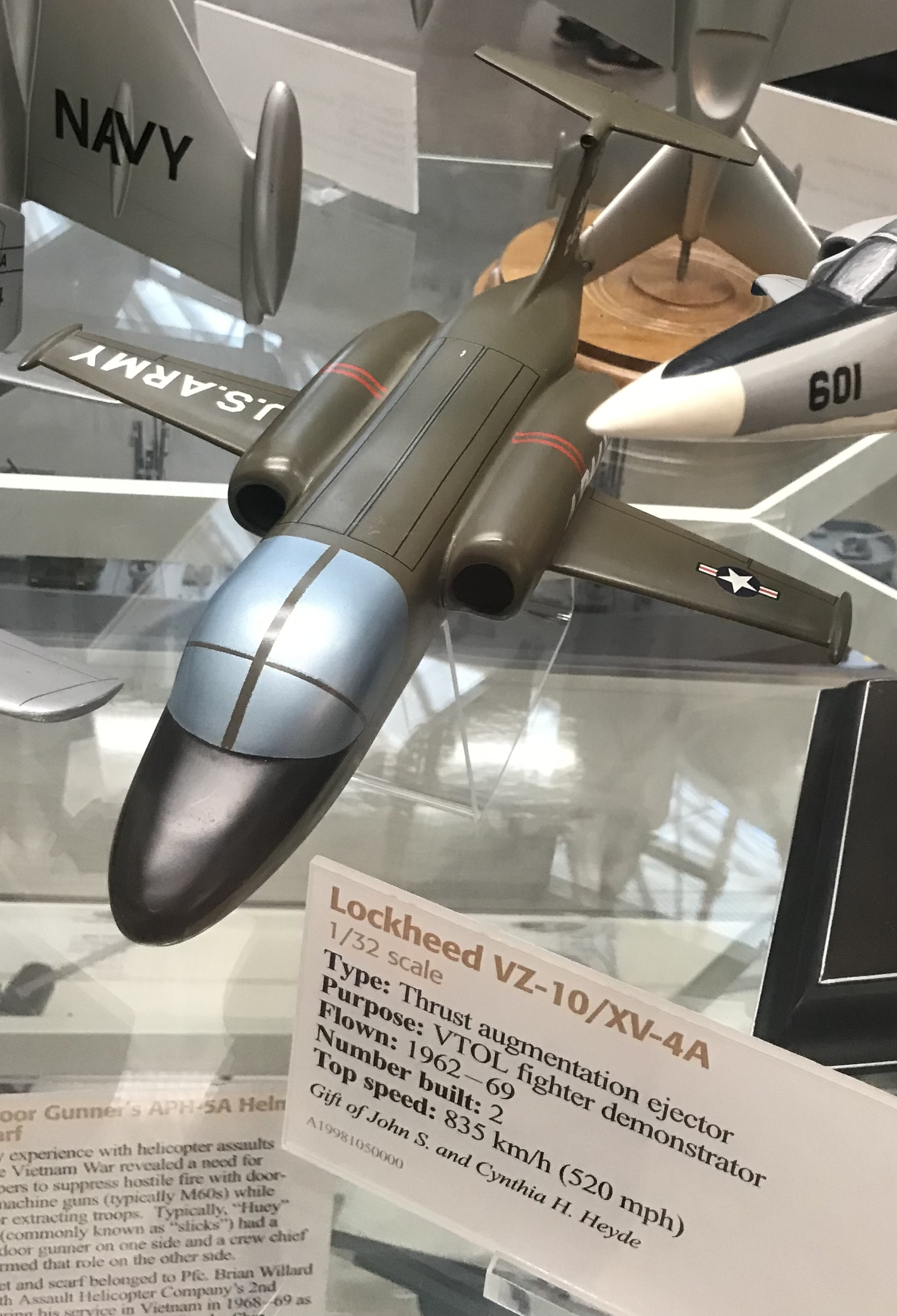
1/32 scale model of the Lockheed VZ-10/XV-4A at the Steven F. Udvar-Hazy Center.

Lockheed modified the second prototype aircraft between 1966 and 1968 to XV-4B standard. The two Pratt & Whitney JT12 engines were replaced with six General Electric J85 turbojets, four of these units acting as lift jets. This aircraft crashed in Georgia on 14 March 1969; pilot Harlan J. Quamme escaped uninjured, using the ejection seat.

== Variants ==
- XV-4A:
- XV-4B:

== Specifications (XV-4A) ==
Data from Lockheed Aircraft since 1913

General characteristics

- Crew: 2
- Length: 32 ft 8 in (9.96 m)
- Wingspan: 25 ft 8 in (7.82 m)
- Height: 11 ft 9 in (3.58 m)
- Wing area: 104.00 sq ft (9.662 m^{2})
- Empty weight: 4,995 lb (2,266 kg)
- Gross weight: 7,200 lb (3,266 kg)
- Powerplant: 2 × Pratt & Whitney JT12A-3LH turbojet, 3,300 lbf (15 kN) thrust each take-off thrust

Performance

- Maximum speed: 518 mph (833 km/h, 450 kn) at 10,000 ft (3,048 m)
- Cruise speed: 390 mph (628 km/h, 339 kn)
- Range: 600 mi (965 km, 521 nmi) normal
- VTO range: 600 mi (966 km)
- Rate of climb: 12,000 ft/min (61 m/s)
- Wing loading: 69.2 lb/sq ft (338 kg/m^{2})
- Thrust/weight: 1.176

== See also ==
Aircraft of comparable role, configuration, and era

- Hawker P.1127
- Rockwell XFV-12
- Ryan XV-5 Vertifan

Related lists

- List of military aircraft of the United States
- List of Lockheed aircraft
- List of VTOL aircraft
