= Pratt & Whitney T73 =

Turboshaft engine

T73/JFTD12
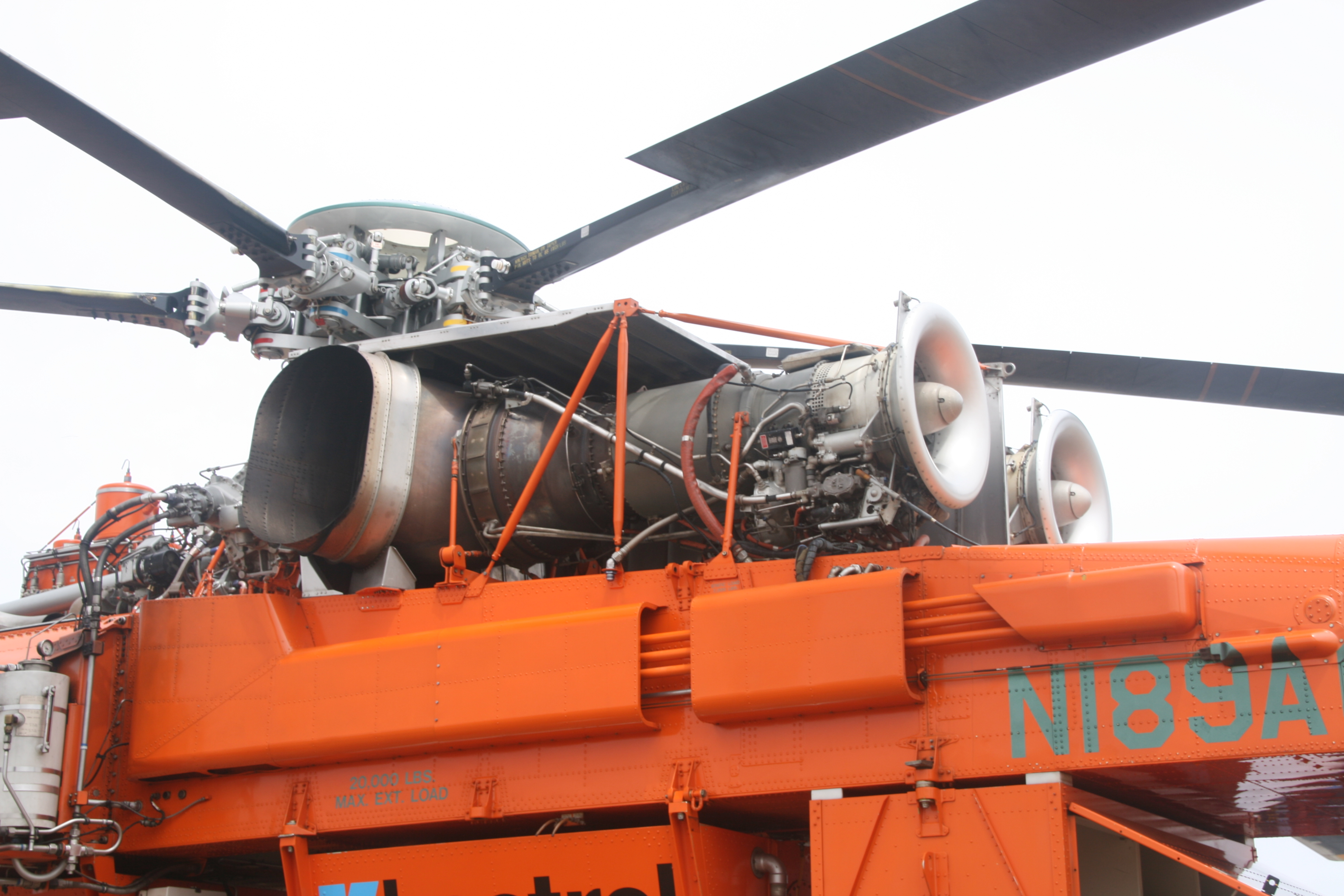
- JFTD12-4A mounted on an Erickson S-64E Aircrane
- Type: Turboshaft
- National origin: United States
- Manufacturer: Pratt & Whitney
- Major applications: Sikorsky CH-54 Tarhe; Sikorsky S-64 Skycrane
- Number built: 352
- Developed from: Pratt & Whitney JT12

The Pratt & Whitney T73 (company designation JFTD12) is a turboshaft engine. Based on the JT12A, the T73 powered the Sikorsky CH-54 Tarhe and its civil counterpart Sikorsky S-64 Skycrane flying crane heavy-lift helicopters. Turboshaft versions for naval use are known as the FT12, and have been used on the Iroquois-class destroyer.

== Variants ==
T73-P-1
Basic military model, rated at 4,500 horsepower (3,355 kW) takeoff power and 4,000 horsepower (2,982 kW) maximum continuous power

T73-P-700
Higher-power military model with improved internal components; rated at 4,800 horsepower (3,579 kW) takeoff power and 4,430 horsepower (3,303 kW) maximum continuous power

JFTD12A-3

JFTD12A-4A
Civilian equivalent of T73-P-1

JFTD12A-5A
Civilian equivalent of T73-P-700

FT12
Marine powerplant

== Applications ==
- Sikorsky CH-54 Tarhe (T73)
- Sikorsky S-64 Skycrane/Erickson Air-Crane S-64 Skycrane (JTFD12)
- Iroquois-class destroyer (FT12AH-3)

== Specifications (T73-P-1) ==
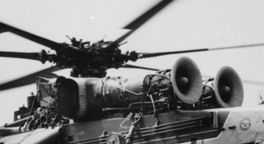
T73s on a Sikorsky CH-54 Tarhe

Data from FAA Type Certificate E15EA

==== General characteristics ====
- Type: Turboshaft
- Length: 107.0 in (2,718 mm)
- Diameter: 30.0 in (762 mm) maximum
- Dry weight: 966 lbs (438 kg)

==== Components ====
- Compressor: nine stage axial compressor
- Combustors: eight cans in annular configuration
- Turbine: axial two stage gas generator turbine and axial two stage free turbine
- Fuel type: aviation kerosene conforming to MIL-I-5161 E Grade I or II

==== Performance ====
- Maximum power output: 4,500 horsepower (3,355 kW) takeoff, 4,000 horsepower (2,982 kW) maximum continuous; at sea level at or below -8°C (17°F)
- Turbine inlet temperature: 688°C (1270°F)
- Power-to-weight ratio: 4.66 hp/lb (7.66 kW/kg)

== See also ==
Related development

- Pratt & Whitney JT12

Comparable engines

- Soloviev D-25
- General Electric T64

Related lists

- List of aircraft engines
