= Boeing Vertol XCH-62 =

Cancelled American heavy-lift helicopter

XCH-62 HLH
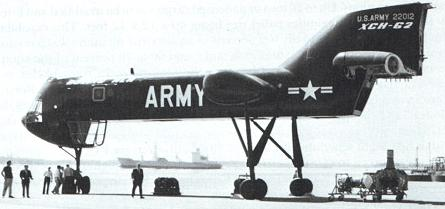

General information
- Type: Heavy-lift helicopter
- Manufacturer: Boeing Vertol
- Status: Program terminated
- Primary user: United States Army
- Number built: 1 (never completed)

The Boeing Vertol XCH-62 (Model 301) was a triple-turbine, heavy-lift helicopter project designed for the United States Army by Boeing Vertol. Approved in 1971, one prototype reached 95% completion before it was canceled in 1975. The prototype was scrapped in 2005.

== Development ==
While the CH-47 Chinook is a large helicopter by American standards, its payload of 28,000 lb (13,000 kg) is dwarfed by the huge Soviet-Russian heavy-lift helicopters such as the Mil Mi-26, with 44,000 lb (20,000 kg) payload, and the experimental Mil V-12, with 55,000 to 88,000 lb (25,000 to 40,000 kg) payload. For a long time Boeing and the US military had an urge to match or top the Mil heavy lifters. In the late 1960s, Boeing came up with designs for machines with broad similarities to the Sea Knight and Chinook, but about twice the size of the Chinook in terms of linear dimensions. Proposed machines included the "Model 227" transport and the "Model 237" flying crane.

The U.S. Department of Defense (DoD) issued a request for proposal (RFP) for a Heavy Lift Helicopter (HLH) in November 1970. On May 7, 1971, the DoD announced the selection of Boeing Vertol to perform the first phase of HLH development. Following award of an Army contract for an HLH prototype in 1973, Boeing did move forward on building an oversized flying crane machine, the "XCH-62". The XCH-62 prototype was in an advanced state of assembly in 1975, being readied for a planned initial flight in 1976. The XT701 engine had passed its 30-hour Prototype Preliminary Flight Rating Test (PPFRT) on March 12, 1975, and then passed a 60-hour Safety Demonstration Test (SDT) on August 4. However, the program was officially canceled on August 1. At the time of cancellation, the prototype was at 95% completion, and it needed about three months of final assembly and checkouts before rollout and installation for pre-flight testing.

Failures in the spiral bevel gearing of the main transmission were experienced in tests because the method of analysis employed had not considered the effect of rim bending. Consequently, new gears with strengthened rims were designed and fabricated. For a more accurate prediction of the load capacity of the gears, an extensive Finite Element Method (FEM) system was developed. The U.S. Army's XCH-62 HLH aft rotor transmission was finally successfully tested at full design torque and speed, but the US Congress cut funding for the program in August 1975. The designers of the Mil Mi-26 avoided similar problems by using a split-torque design in the main rotor transmission.

Subsequent attempts were made to finish the incomplete XCH-62 prototype, which had a serial number of 73-22012. In the mid-1980s, the Army, the US National Aeronautics & Space Administration (NASA), and the Defense Advanced Research Projects Agency (DARPA) collaborated on a scheme to finish the XCH-62 for experimental flights, requesting a combined US$71 million in funding through fiscal year 1989. However, Congress declined funding, and the craft remained incomplete. The prototype was moved from a warehouse storage site in Philadelphia, Pennsylvania, floated by barge to Panama City, Florida, and then lifted by a CH-47D Chinook helicopter to the US Army Aviation Museum at Fort Rucker, Alabama on December 8, 1987. The XCH-62 prototype, the largest helicopter ever built in the western countries, was displayed at the US Army Aviation Museum until it was later scrapped in 2005. In 2008, several parts were sent to the Helicopter Museum at Weston-super-Mare (United Kingdom), to be exhibited there.

== Design ==
The XCH-62 is a tandem rotor helicopter, with four blades on each rotor. Its rotor diameter was to be 92 ft (28 m), fuselage length 89 ft 3 in (27.20 m), and footprint length 162 ft 3 in (49.45 m). The maximum width with blades folded was 29 ft 10 in (9.09 m). The rotor blade had a length of 42 ft (13 m), a chord of 40 in (1,000 mm), and a weight of 750 lb (340 kg). The fuselage was mounted high to provide 14 ft (4.3 m) of ground clearance, which let the helicopter taxi over a container for lifting. However, the taxiing requirement was later eliminated because of the helicopter's ability to hover and lift a load, so a second prototype would probably have had only 8 ft 8 in (2.64 m) of ground clearance, which would lower the overall height and reduce the amount of modifications required for the helicopter to fit into hangars.

The rotorcraft was designed to lift a standard Department of Defense, 8 ft × 8 ft × 20 ft (2.4 m × 2.4 m × 6.1 m) MILVAN container weighing up to 22.4 short tons (20,300 kg). Its widely spaced landing gear would allow it to straddle heavy cargoes such as armored vehicles, and still carry twelve troops in its slender fuselage. Boeing also considered selling a commercial version, the "Model 301". The helicopter was powered by three Allison XT701-AD-700 turboshafts, developed from Allison's 501-M62B engines, which each produced 8,079 shp (6,025 kW) static sea-level power to rotate a shaft at 11,485 rpm. A combiner gearbox converted the power of the three shafts into two transmission shafts turning at 7,976 rpm, leading into forward and aft rotor transmissions that produced 10,620 shp (7,920 kW) at 155.7 rpm. The XCH-62 was designed to be the first helicopter with a fly-by-wire flight control system without a mechanical backup.

== Specifications (XCH-62A) ==
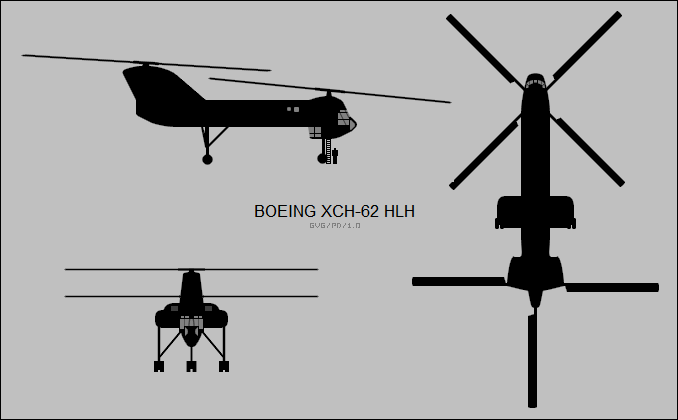

Data from America's heavy lift helicopter

General characteristics

- Crew: 5 (pilot, copilot, flight engineer, load controlling crewman, and crew chief)
- Capacity: 12 troops
- Length: 87 ft 3 in (26.59 m) (overall fuselage length)
- Height: 32 ft 3 in (9.83 m) (to top of pylon)
- Empty weight: 59,580 lb (27,025 kg)
- Gross weight: 118,000 lb (53,524 kg)
- Powerplant: 3 × Allison T701-AD-700 turboshaft, 8,080 hp (6,030 kW) each
- Main rotor diameter: 2 × 92 ft 0 in (28.04 m)
- Main rotor area: 13,260 sq ft (1,232 m^{2})

Performance

- Maximum speed: 145 kn (167 mph, 269 km/h) with external load
- Combat range: 150 nmi (170 mi, 280 km)
- Ferry range: 1,500 nmi (1,700 mi, 2,800 km)

== See also ==
- Aerial crane

Related development

- Boeing CH-47 Chinook
- Boeing Vertol BV-347

Aircraft of comparable role, configuration, and era

- Mil Mi-10
- Sikorsky S-73

Related lists

- List of helicopters
