= Erickson Inc. =

American aircraft manufacturing and operating company

Erickson Incorporated
- Trade name: Erickson
- Formerly: Erickson Air-Crane
- Type: Private
- Traded as: Nasdaq: EAC
- Industry: Aviation
- Founded: 1971; 55 years ago, in Central Point, Oregon, United States
- Founder: Jack Erickson
- Headquarters: Central Point, Oregon, United States of America
- Number of locations: 8 facilities (2014)
- Key people: Barry Kohler (CEO)
- Products: Helicopter manufacturer and operator
- Services: Manufacturer and operator of the S-64 Air Crane Helicopter
- Website: www.ericksoninc.com

Erickson Incorporated is an aerospace manufacturing and aviation service provider based in Central Point, Oregon, United States Founded in 1971, it is known for producing and operating the S-64 Aircrane helicopter, which is used in aerial firefighting and other heavy-lift operations. Erickson Incorporated operates globally and has a fleet of 69 rotary-wing and fixed-wing aircraft including 20 S-64s. The company was known as Erickson Air-Crane Incorporated until 2014.

== History ==
In 1969, Jack Erickson leased a Sikorsky S-61 helicopter from Wes Lematta of Columbia Helicopters to test the effectiveness of helicopters for logging. Following this test Erickson realized he would need a larger helicopter. He purchased three S-64 Skycranes from Sikorsky Aircraft and founded Erickson Air-Crane in December 1971. He quickly expanded the business to include power line construction and firefighting. In 1973, Erickson began using Aircranes to replace HVAC units on top of high-rises. The following year Erickson invented the anti-rotation device which stabilizes loads and provided for great performance and agility. This new technology allowed the company to begin building power line towers.

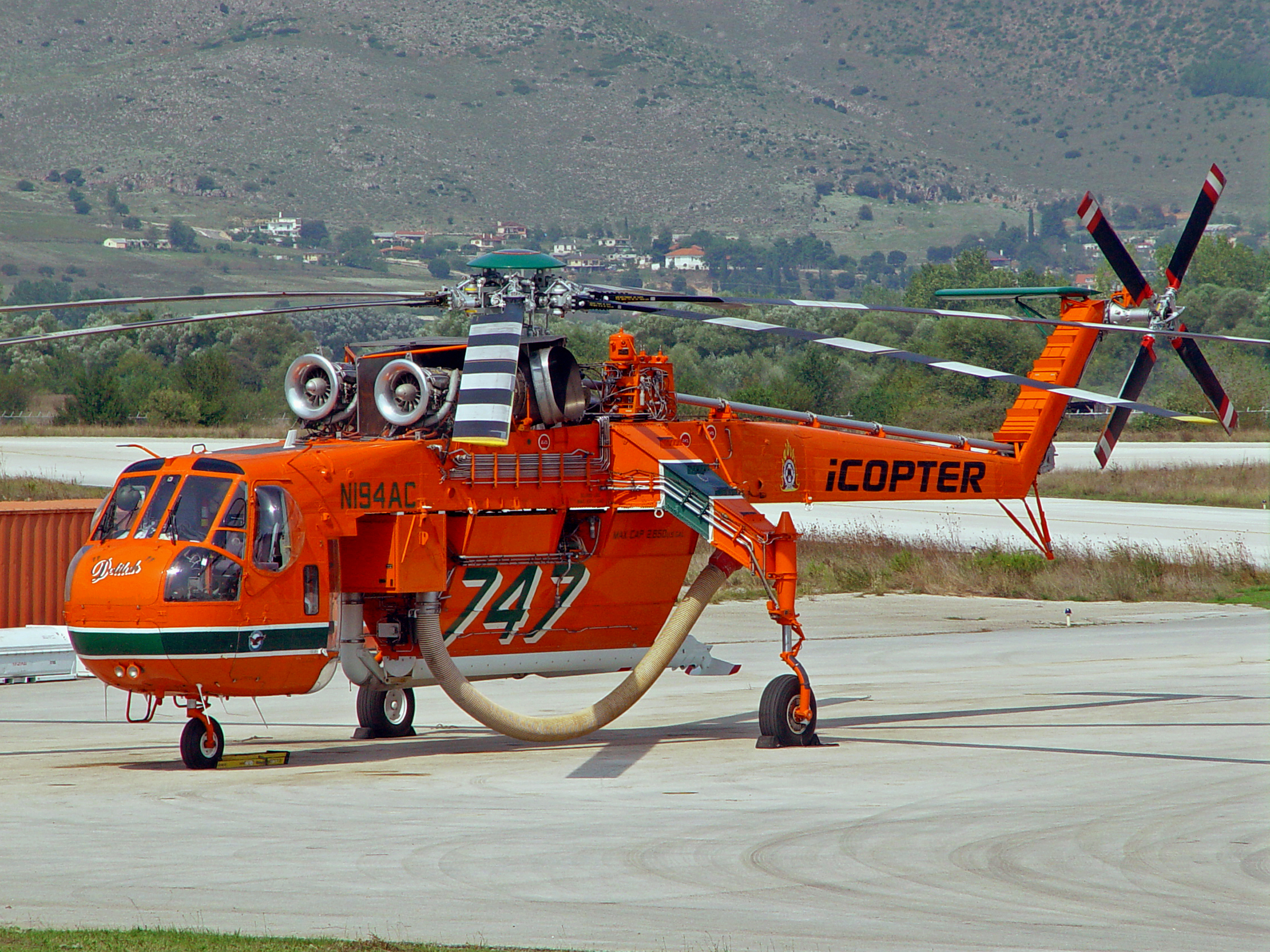
S-64E Erickson Air-Crane photographed at Ioannina airport, Greece

In 1992, Erickson Air-Crane purchased the type certification and manufacturing rights for the S-64 from Sikorsky. Since that time, Erickson Air-Crane has become the manufacturer and world's largest operator of S-64 Aircranes and has made over 1,350 improvements to the airframe, instrumentation, and payload capabilities of the helicopter.

In 2007, Erickson was sold to ZM Private Equity Fund, who in 2009 moved the company's headquarters to Portland. Then a privately held company, Erickson announced plans to go public in 2010, which was delayed into 2012. On April 11, 2012, the company completed an initial public offering and began trading on the NASDAQ market, with ZM Private Equity Fund retaining ownership of 63% of the company. The company acquired Evergreen International Aviation's helicopter unit for $250 million in March 2013. Erickson then bought Brazil-based HRT Participações em Petroleo's oil and gas unit, with the deal expected to be finalized in 2013.

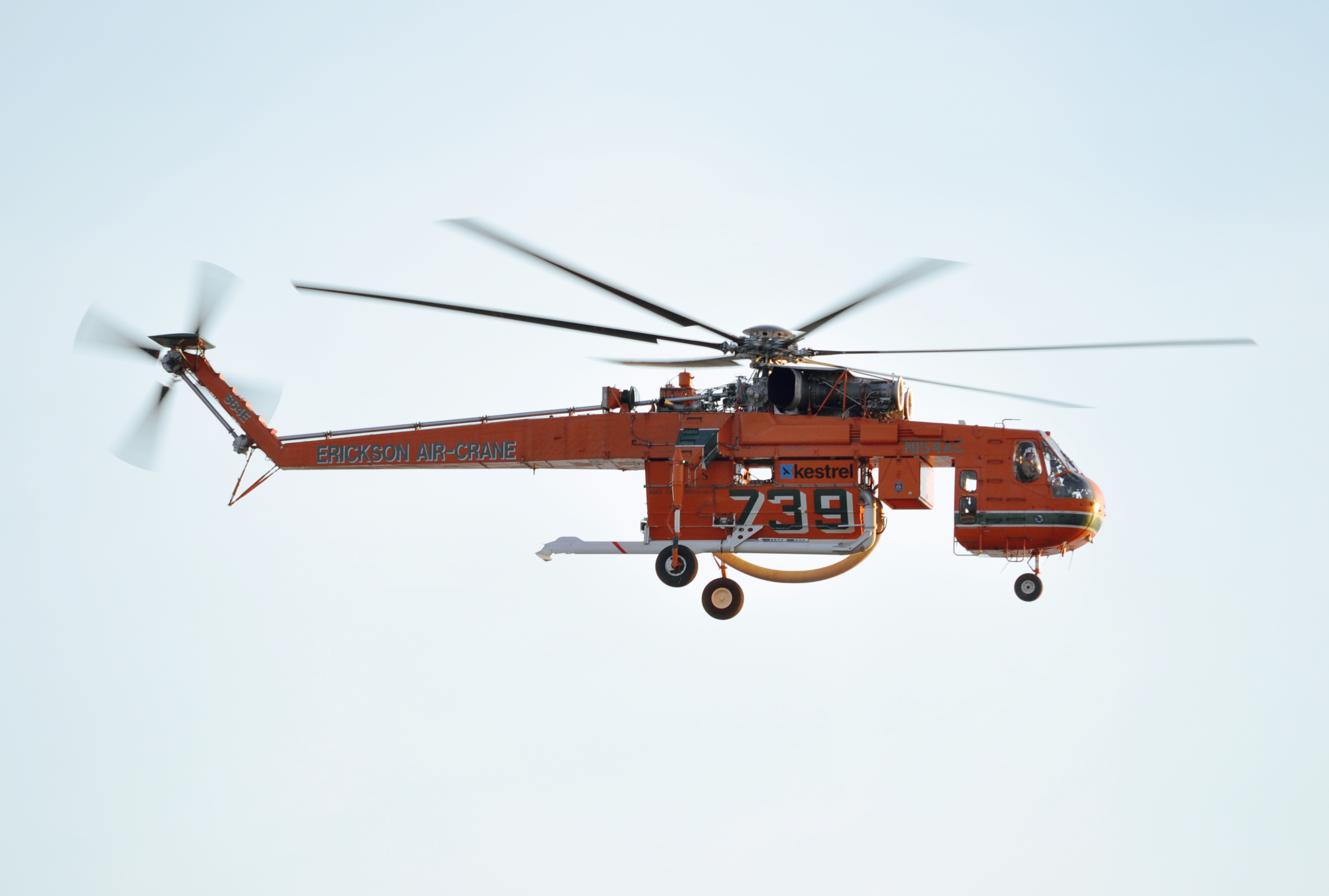
Erickson Aircrane used for firefighting operations primarily in Western Australia

The name of the company was changed to Erickson Inc. in February 2014. The following year the company reorganized into three business units: Commercial Aviation Services, Government Aviation Services, and Manufacturing and MRO.

In 2015, Erickson enacted a license agreement with Bell Helicopter to provide aftermarket support for the Bell 214B, 214B-1 and 214ST platforms.

The Evergreen purchase was financed partly with debt, and (together with challenging business conditions) caused Erickson to file for Chapter 11 bankruptcy in November 2016 to reorganize while keeping the business running. During bankruptcy the company returned to private ownership and emerged from bankruptcy protection in May 2017.

Erickson appointed government services veteran Doug Kitani as CEO and Director August 31, 2017. He was previously CEO and director of government services firm IAP Worldwide Services. He has also worked in private investment and general management for Honeywell and General Electric.

In 2021, Erickson completed the acquisition of the type certificate for the Bell 214B, 214B-1 and 214ST platforms. In 2023, the type certificates along with Erickson's 214ST fleet, support equipment and spare parts were sold to Australian helicopter specialist McDermott Aviation.

== Heliport ==
The company owns Erickson Air-Crane Admin Offices Heliport (FAA LID: OG58), a private, 130 ft × 130 ft (40 m × 40 m) heliport.

== See also ==
- Aerial firefighting
- Helitack
- List of companies based in Oregon
