= Sikorsky S-64 Skycrane =

American twin-engine heavy-lift helicopter

S-64 Skycrane / Aircrane
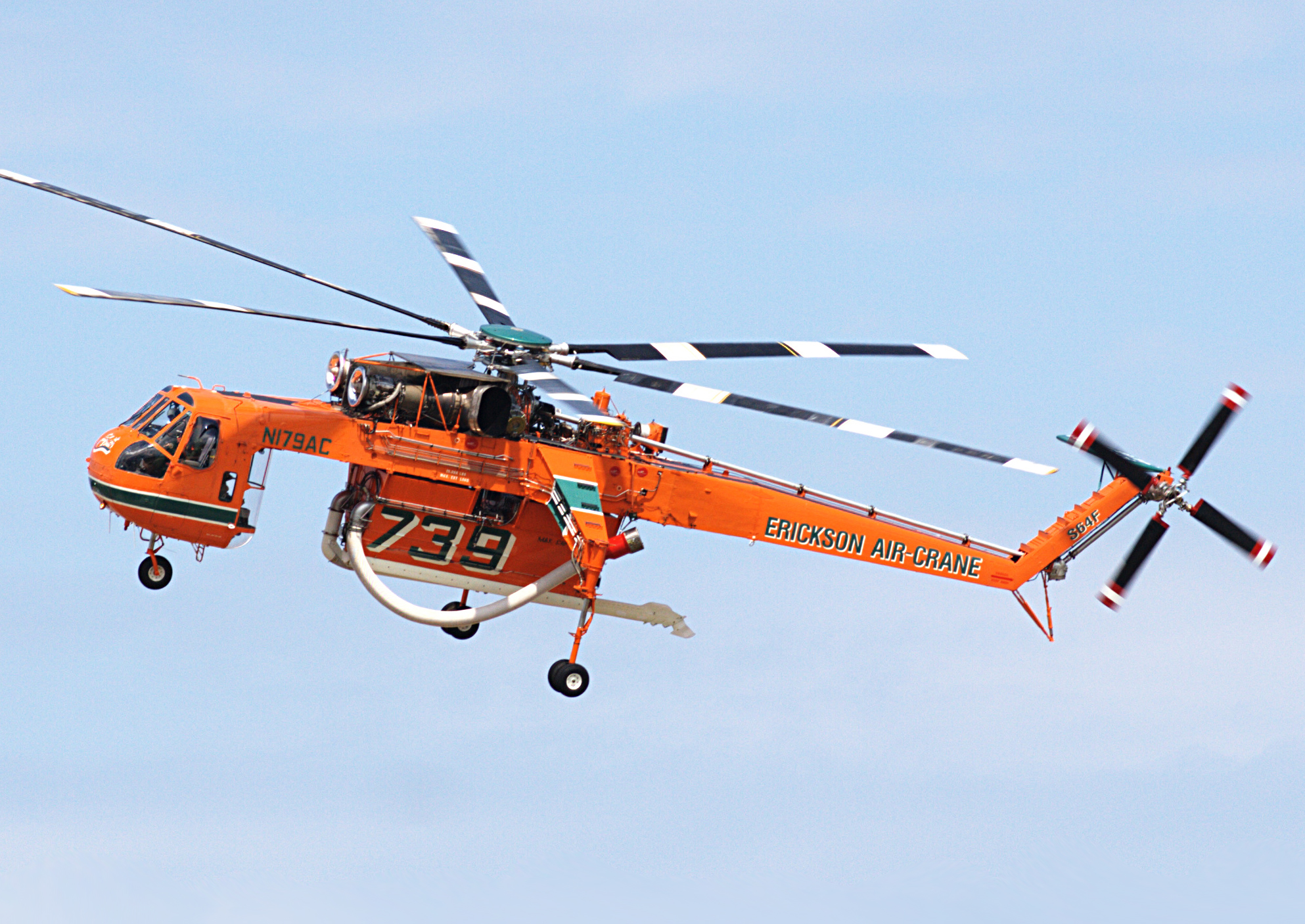
- Erickson S-64 over EAA AirVenture Oshkosh 2009

General information
- Type: Aerial crane
- National origin: United States
- Manufacturer: Sikorsky Aircraft; Erickson Inc.
- Status: In service
- Primary user: Erickson Inc.
- Number built: 100

History
- First flight: 9 May 1962
- Developed from: Sikorsky CH-54 Tarhe

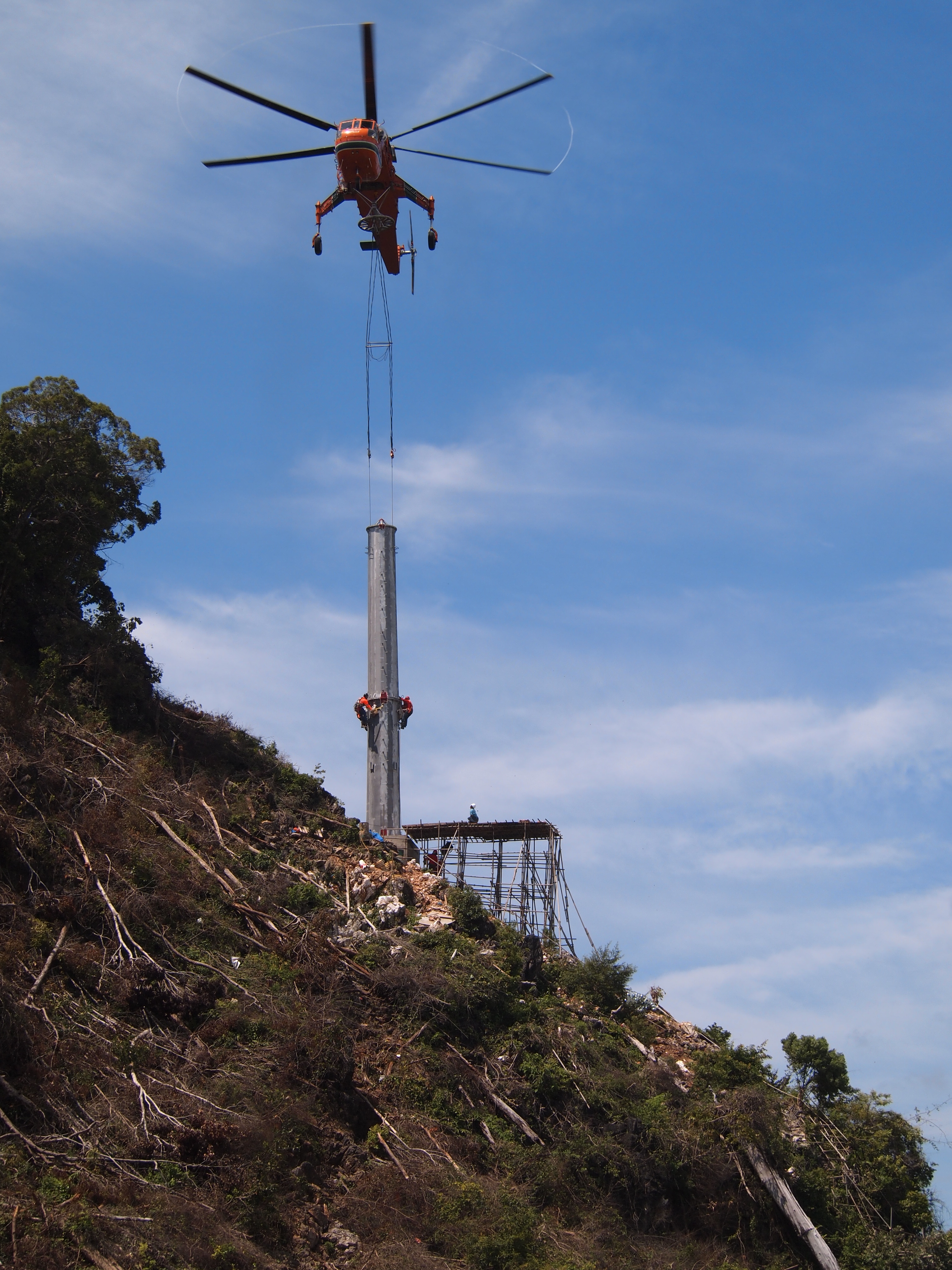
Sikorsky installing monopole in Langkawi, Malaysia

The Sikorsky S-64 Skycrane is an American twin-engine heavy-lift helicopter. It is the civilian version of the United States Army's Sikorsky CH-54 Tarhe heavy lifter.

Since 1992, the type certificate has been owned by Erickson Inc. (then trading as Erickson Air-Crane; in addition to the provision of OEM and MRO functions, Erickson has undertaken the manufacture of new S-64s, as well as the remanufacturing of existing CH-54s, using the S-64 Aircrane designation.

== Development ==
=== Under Sikorsky ===
The Sikorsky S-64 was designed as an enlarged version of the prototype flying crane helicopter, the Sikorsky S-60. One issue encountered during development was the lack of a suitable turboshaft powerplant; to tackle this availability issue, Sikorsky opted to cooperate with the American engine manufacturer Pratt and Whitney to modify their JT12 turbojet to produce a suitable engine for it. One of the more innovative features that Sikorsky opted for was the incorporation of an automatic flight control system, effectively a fly-by-wire arrangement, which was in part responsible for the rotorcraft being relatively easy to fly under instrument flight rules (IFR).

The S-64 was equipped with a six-blade main rotor and was powered by a pair of 4,050 shaft horsepower (3,020 kW) Pratt & Whitney JFTD12A turboshaft engines. The prototype S-64 made its maiden flight on 9 May 1962; it was promptly followed by two further prototypes. Amongst other activities, one prototype was flight tested by the United States Army at Fort Benning as a potential replacement for the Sikorsky CH-37 Mojave while the other two underwent an evaluation in West Germany. While the Germans ultimately did not place an order for the type, the US Army did issue an initial order for six S-64A helicopters (under the designation YCH-54A Tarhe). Separately, an initial batch of seven S-64E helicopters were built by Sikorsky for the civil market.

From the onset of development, Sikorsky intended for the S-64 to be capable of carrying as diverse a range of cargoes as possible; this ethos led to the incorporation of fittings for the carriage of barges and of a specially-designed multipurpose "people pod" that was suited for use for personnel transport or as mobile hospital. During the late 1960s, both Sikorsky and the S-64 were participants in the development of a 'flying lounge' module that could be carried by the S-64. Specifically, this module (built by the Budd Company) was trial-operated in conjunction with AirportTransit and Los Angeles Airways as a faster means of transferring passengers between the airport and the city itself during 1967.

=== Under Erickson ===
Originally a Sikorsky Aircraft product, the type certificate and manufacturing rights were purchased from them by Erickson Air-Crane in 1992. Since that time, Erickson Air-Crane has become the manufacturer and world's largest operator of S-64 Aircranes and has made over 1,350 changes to the airframe, instrumentation, and payload capabilities of the helicopter. The Aircrane can be fitted with a 2,650 US gal (10,000 L) fixed retardant tank to assist in the control of bush fires. The helicopter is capable of refilling its entire tank of water in 45 seconds from a tube (typically referred to as a snorkel) 18 inches (46 cm) in diameter.

Erickson has introduced numerous improvements to the S-64 over the years. During March 2020, a new composite main rotor blade, designed by Erickson for the S-64E to increase its overall lift capacity by roughly 3,000lb as well as reduce manufacturing costs by 33 percent and decrease maintenance costs by 75 percent, received formal approval from the Federal Aviation Administration (FAA); these rotor blades have been designed to replace the metal counterparts on existing rotorcraft of various models. In the mid 2010s, the company introduced a new avionics package for the platform, providing Automatic Dependent Surveillance–Broadcast functionality along with measures to improve the pilot's situational awareness, specifically the Helicopter Terrain and Awareness System (HTAWS). Starting in 2018, Erickson been developing an improved water cannon, which is lighter and electrically-driven in comparison to the traditional hydraulically-driven counterparts.

During the late 2010s and 2020s, Erickson has worked on the development of its autonomous S-64F+, which it has promoted to the US Army as a potential optionally-piloted cargo delivery helicopter. In 2020, the company announced its plans to restart production of new-build S-64s.

== Operational history ==
The S-64 fleet owned by Erickson Inc. has been frequently leased to various operators across the world, including companies and government agencies alike, for either short-term or longer term use to conduct fire suppression, civil protection, heavy lift construction, and timber harvesting missions. Erickson gives each of its S-64s an individual name, the best-known being "Elvis", used in fighting fires in Australia alongside "The Incredible Hulk" and "Isabelle". Other operators, such as Siller Brothers, have followed with their Sikorsky S-64E, Andy's Pride. One S-64E, nicknamed "Olga", was used to lift the top section of the CN Tower into place in Toronto, Ontario, Canada.

During the 2010s, multiple S-64s were sold to both the Italian and Korean Forest Services for fire suppression and emergency response duties. In April 2024, it was announced that Erickson Inc.’s aerial firefighting division, along with its entire S-64 fleet, had been purchased by Helicopter Express, resulting in the firm possessing a total of 19 examples.

== Variants ==
=== Sikorsky Skycrane ===
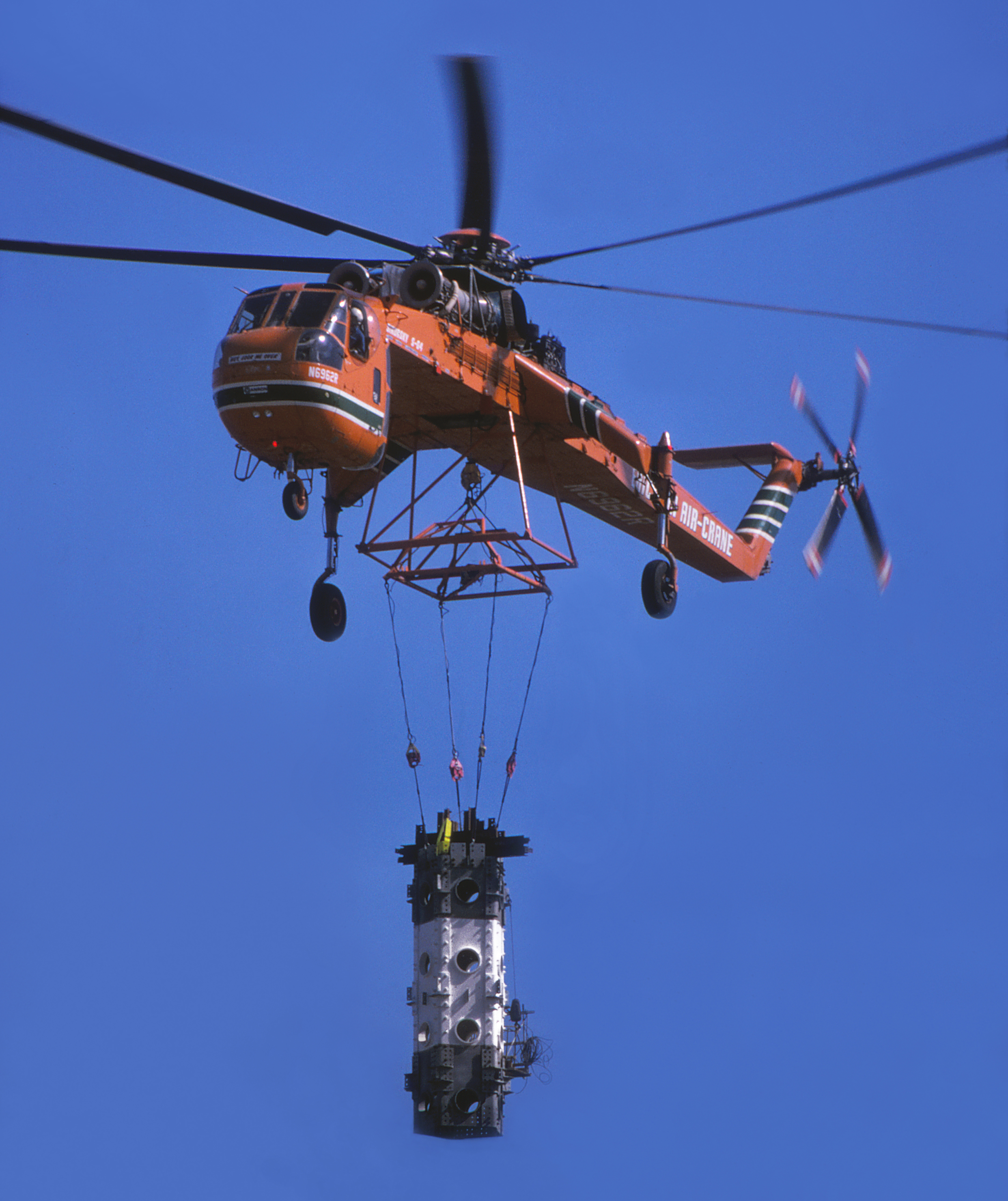
Skycrane "Olga" with CN Tower antenna segment, Toronto, 1975

S-64
Twin-engined heavy-lift helicopter, 3 built. 1 rebuilt as S-64E.
S-64A
Six test and evaluation helicopters for the US Army.

S-64B
Civil version of CH-54A, 7 built.

=== Erickson ===
S-64E
Upgraded CH-54A helicopters, plus one new build aircraft; 17 aircraft in total.
S-64F
Upgraded CH-54B helicopters; powered by two Pratt & Whitney JFTD12-5A engines; 13 aircraft in total.
S-64F+
Proposed upgraded version with new engines, avionics, and optional piloting.

== Operators ==
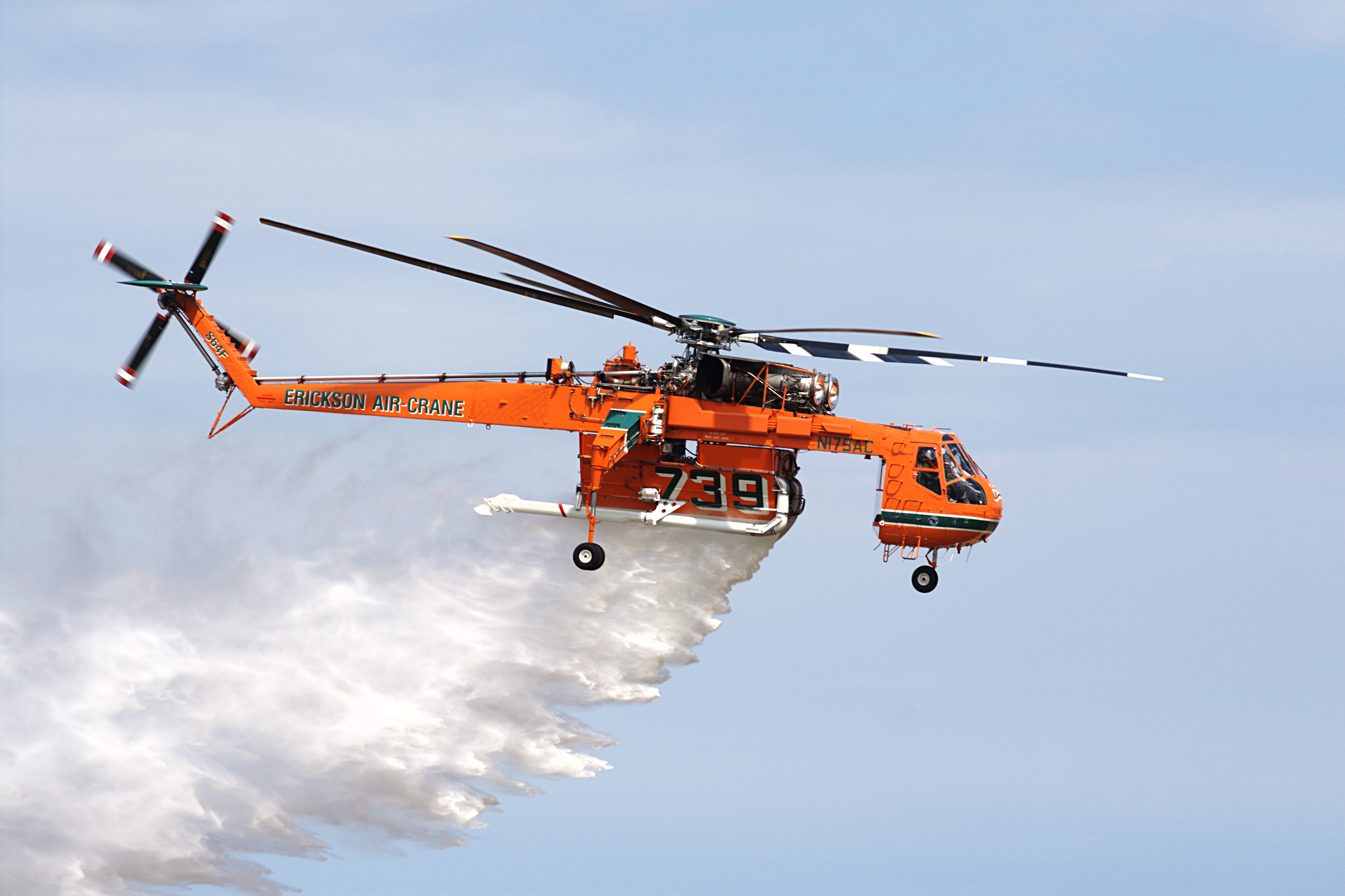
An Erickson S-64 making a water drop

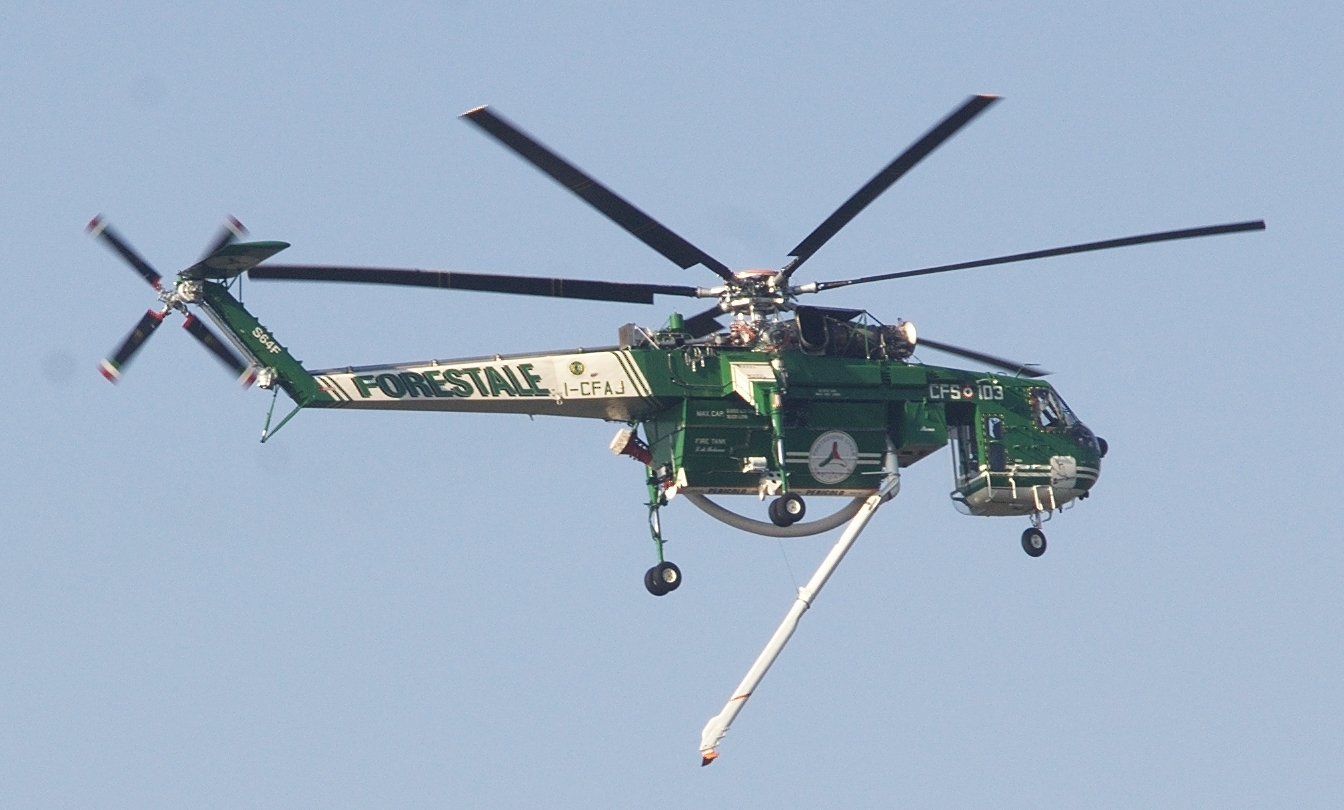
European Air-Crane Operators S-64F

Italy

- EUROPEAN AIR-CRANE
- Corpo Nazionale dei Vigili del Fuoco (contracted by European Air-Crane)

South Korea

- Korea Forest Service (6 in service)

United States

- Columbia Helicopters (no longer in use)
- Erickson Air-Crane
- Evergreen Helicopters, Inc. (bought by Erickson Air-Crane)
- Helicopter Express
- Helicopter Transport Services
- Los Angeles City Fire Department (contracted by Erickson Air-Crane)
- Los Angeles County Fire Department (contracted by Erickson Air-Crane)
- San Diego Gas and Electric (contracted by Erickson Air-Crane)
- Siller Helicopters

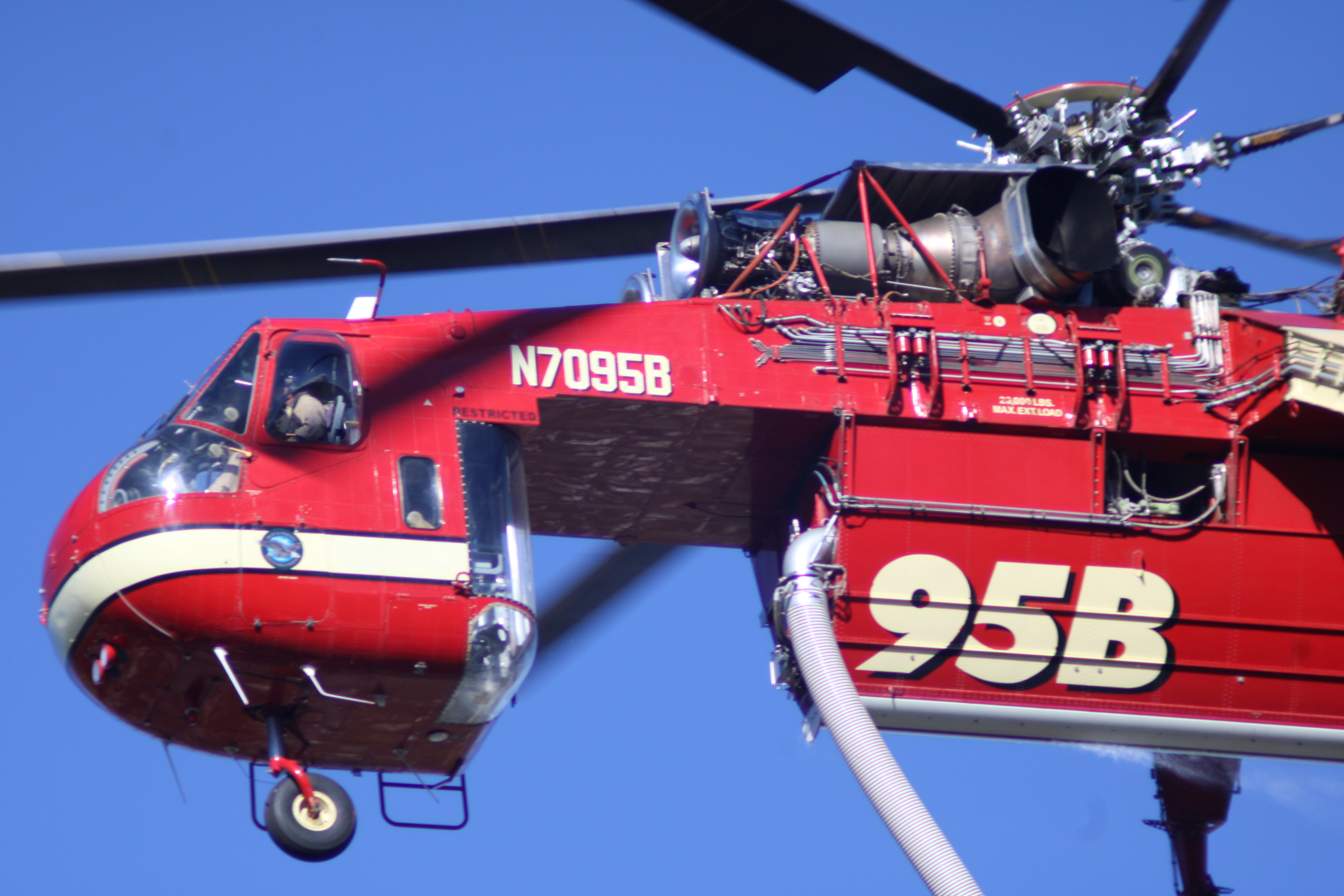
A Siller S-64, registered N7095B, flying near Encino, Los Angeles fighting the Palisades Fire.

== Incidents ==
- N189AC "Gypsy Lady" – crashed in Ojai, California on 1 October 2006. While operating for the USFS, the Erickson S-64 snagged a dip tank and the helicopter rolled over and crashed.
- N198AC "Shirley Jean" – S-64F; sold to European Air-Crane c.2006 as I-SEAD; crashed in Italy on 2007-04-26. Aircraft was destroyed in a post-crash fire.
- N248AC "Aurora" – S-64E; named after Aurora State Airport, home to Columbia Helicopters, former owner of aircraft. Crashed on 26 August 2004 in Corsica, killing its Canadian pilot and French co-pilot. The aircrane was chartered by the interior ministry to fight fires on the French Mediterranean island of Corsica. It had been fighting a wildfire as it went down near the village of Ventiseri, trying to return to a nearby military base, due to technical problems associated with inflight breakup.
- N173AC "Christine" – S-64E; ditched into a small dam within Melbourne's water catchment with no casualties during a firefighting operation in Gippsland, Victoria, Australia on 28 January 2019. The crew, consisting of two pilots and the flight engineer, were able to bail from the aircraft in 7 to 10 feet (2 to 3 m) of water and swim to safety with no life-threatening injuries. The aircraft was rebuilt at Erickson's Central Point, Oregon facility and flew again in early 2021.
- N4037S - An S-64E operated by Siller Helicopters sustained damage to the right main landing gear wheel and tire assembly after a midair collision with a Bell 407 near Cabazon, California while both aircraft were responding to a reported fire on 6 August 2023. The S-64 landed near the collision site with no injuries to the two pilots on board. The Bell 407 sustained substantial damage in the collision, leaving a debris field approximately 1,000 feet (300 m) in length before coming to rest on a rocky hillside where it was consumed by a post-crash fire. The contract pilot along with a Cal Fire Assistant Chief and Cal Fire Captain on board the Bell 407 were killed.
- N793HT, a CH-54A operated by Helicopter Transport Services, crashed in Richfield, Utah while fighting the Widemouth 2 Fire on August 7, 2026. Both crew members were fatally injured; their bodies were recovered on August 8, 2026.

== Specifications (S-64E) ==

Data from The International Directory of Civil Aircraft

General characteristics

- Crew: 3 (pilot, co-pilot), plus one rear-facing aft-stick operator during external-load operations (Note: The minimum crew is two and the aft-stick operation can be done by the co-pilot.)
- Capacity: up to five total occupants (Note: The helicopter has five seats but the two observer seats can not be used during external load operations; if the aft-stick seat is used when not used for external-load operations, then the controls have to be disengaged and guarded.) / 20,000 lb (9,100 kg) payload
- Length: 70 ft 3 in (21.41 m)
- Height: 18 ft 7 in (5.66 m)
- Empty weight: 19,234 lb (8,724 kg)
- Max takeoff weight: 42,000 lb (19,051 kg)
- Powerplant: 2 × Pratt & Whitney JFTD12-4A (T73-P-1) turboshaft engines, 4,500 shp (3,400 kW) each
- Main rotor diameter: 72 ft 0 in (21.95 m)
- Main rotor area: 4,070 sq ft (378 m^{2})

Performance

- Maximum speed: 115 kn (132 mph, 213 km/h)
- Cruise speed: 115 kn (132 mph, 213 km/h)
- Never exceed speed: 115 kn (132 mph, 213 km/h)
- Range: 200 nmi (230 mi, 370 km) max fuel and reserves
- Hover ceiling IGE S-64E: 10,600 ft (3,200 m)
- Hover ceiling IGE S-64A: 9,700 ft (3,000 m)
- Rate of climb: 1,330 ft/min (6.8 m/s)

== See also ==
- Aerial firefighting
- Kaman K-MAX

Related development

- Sikorsky CH-53 Sea Stallion
- Sikorsky CH-54 Tarhe
- Sikorsky S-60

Aircraft of comparable role, configuration, and era

- Mil Mi-10

Related lists

- List of active United States military aircraft
- List of military aircraft of the United States
- List of rotorcraft
- List of surviving Sikorsky CH-54s
