= Pratt & Whitney JT12 =

American military turbojet engine

JT12
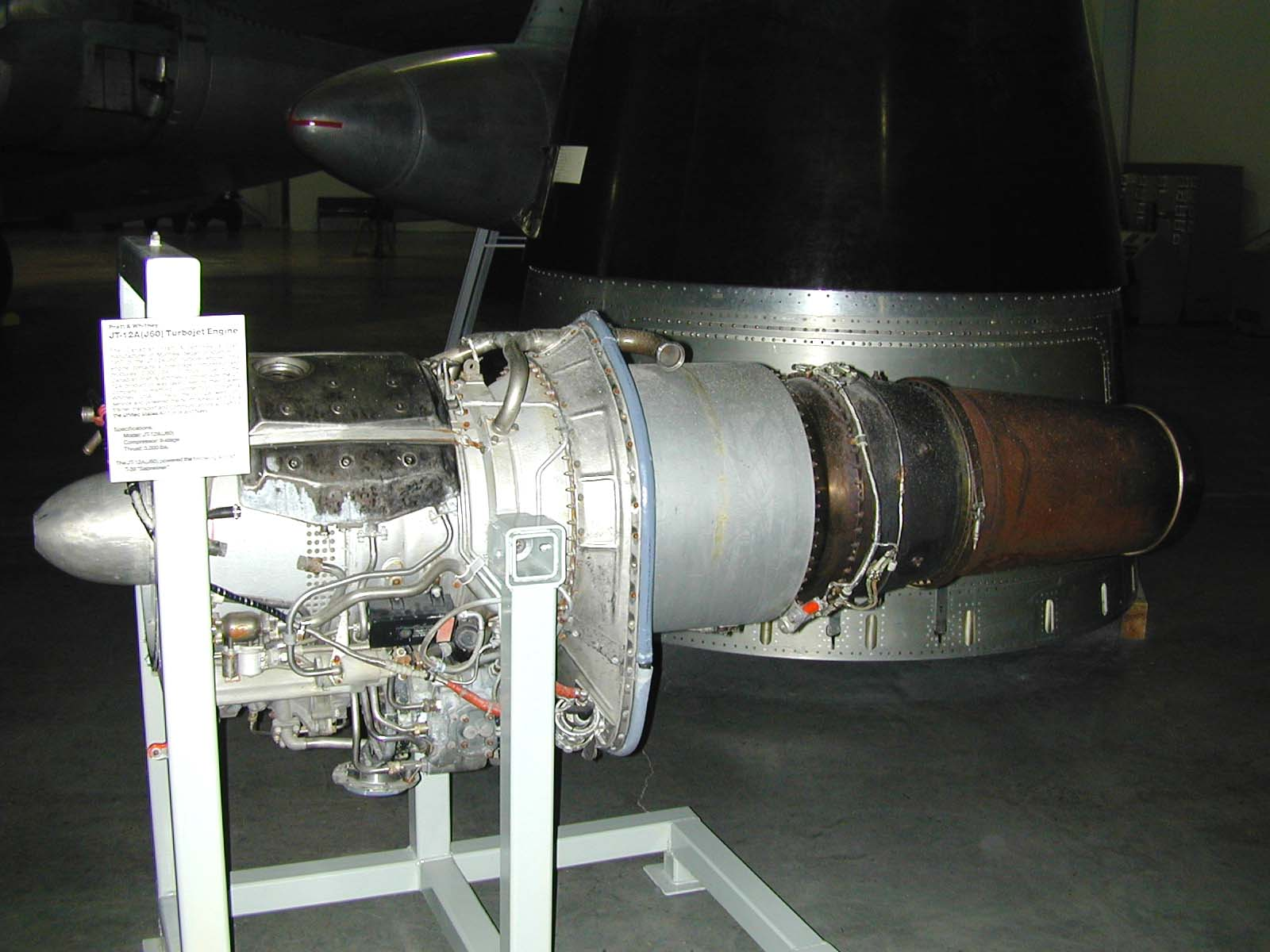
- A Cutaway JT12A Turbojet
- Type: Turbojet
- National origin: United States
- Manufacturer: Pratt & Whitney
- First run: 1957
- Major applications: North American Sabreliner
- Number built: 800+
- Variants: Pratt & Whitney T73

The Pratt & Whitney JT12 (US military designation J60) is a small turbojet engine. The Pratt & Whitney T73 (Pratt & Whitney JFTD12) is a related turboshaft engine.

== Design and development ==
The J60 conception and project design began in July 1957 at United Aircraft of Canada (now Pratt & Whitney Canada) in Montreal. The project design details were transferred to the main P&W company in East Hartford and in May 1958, the first prototype, with military designation YJ60-P-1 commenced testing.

Flight tests were completed in early 1959; followed by the delivery of the new JT12A-5 engines in July 1959. These were for the two Canadair CL-41 prototype trainers with a rating of 12.9 kN (2,900 lb st). The modified JT12A-3 turbojets with a basic rating of 14.69 kN (3,300 lb st) were tested in the two Lockheed XV-4A Hummingbird VTOL research aircraft. The next version, JT12A-21, had an afterburner which delivered a maximum thrust of 17.91 kN (4,025 lb st).

== Variants ==
Data from Janes
YJ60-P-1
prototype
J60-P-3
J60-P-3A
J60-P-4
J60-P-5
J60-P-6
J60-P-9
T73
Military designation of the Pratt & Whitney JFTD12 free power turbine turboshaft version of the J60.
JT12A-3LH
JT12A-5
(J60-P-3 / -3A / -5 / -6 / -9) Take-off ratings from 2,900 lbf (12.9 kN) to 3,001 lbf (13.35 kN).
JT12A-6
Essentially similar to the -5
JT12A-6A
JT12A-7
(J60-P-4) up-rated to 3,300 lbf (15 kN)
JT12A-8
JT12A-8A
JT12A-21
An after-burning version developing 4,023 lbf (18 kN) thrust wet.
FT12
Turboshaft versions for marine use.
JFTD12
Company designation of the Pratt & Whitney T73 free power turbine turbo-shaft version of the J60.

=== Civilian (JT12) ===
- Lockheed JetStar
- North American Sabreliner
- Aérotrain Experimental 02 (French Touch in 60')
- Dassault Mystère 20 (Falcon 20) prototype

=== Military (J60) ===
- Lockheed XH-51
- Lockheed XV-4 Hummingbird
- Martin/General Dynamics RB-57F Canberra
- North American T-2B Buckeye
- North American T-39 Sabreliner
- Republic SD-4 Swallow
- Fairchild SD-5 Osprey
- Sikorsky S-69
- Sikorsky XV-2

== Specifications (JT12A-8A) ==
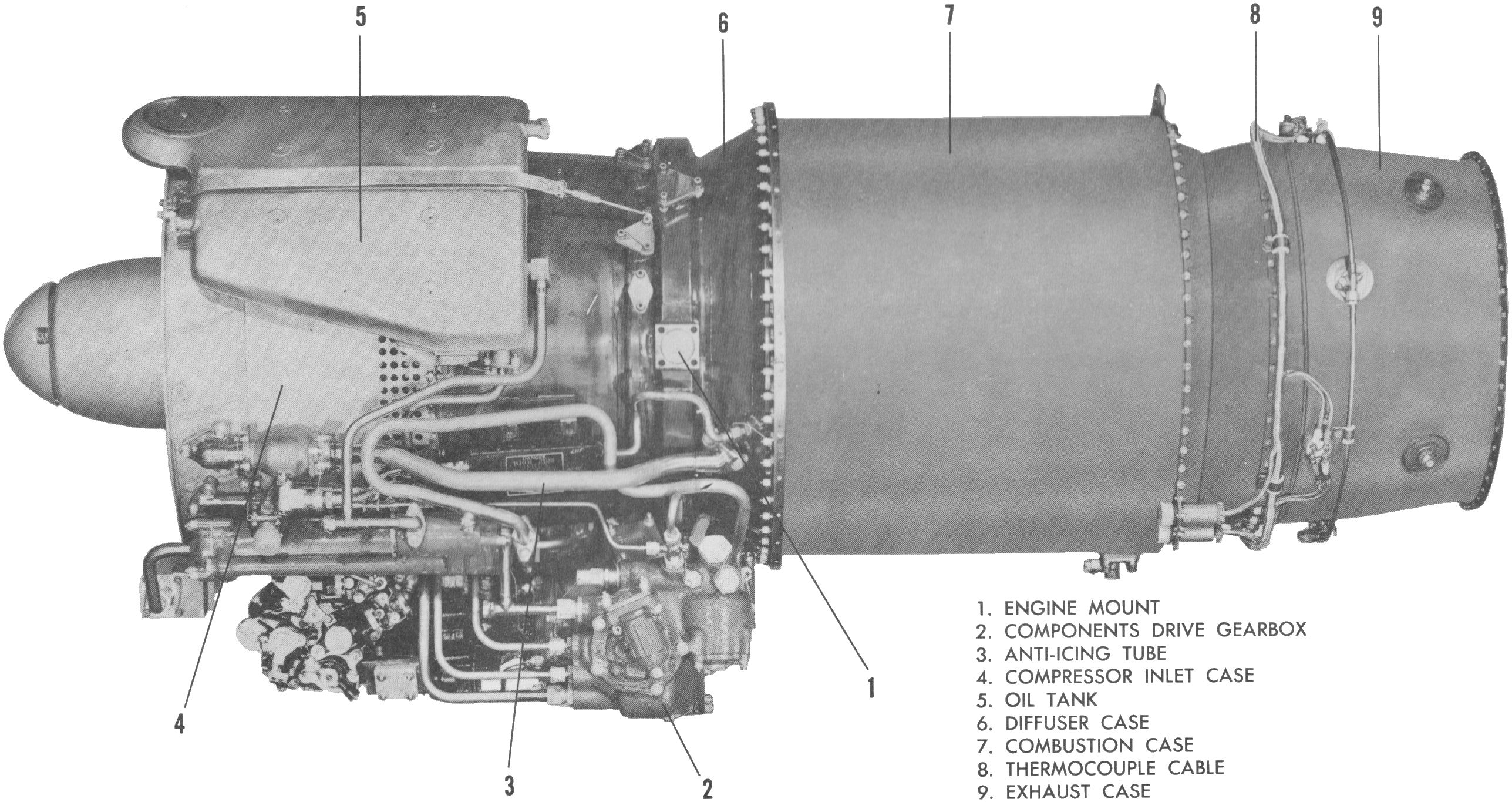
J60-P-5 profile view

Data from Aircraft engines of the World 1966/67

==== General characteristics ====
- Type: Commercial turbojet
- Length: 78 in (2,000 mm)
- Diameter: 22 in (560 mm)
- Dry weight: 468 lb (212 kg)

==== Components ====
- Compressor: 9-stage axial compressor
- Combustors: Cannular - 8 burner cans in an annular casing
- Turbine: 2-stage axial turbine
- Fuel type: ASTM-A-1 / MIL-J-5624 / JP-1 / JP-4 / JP-5
- Oil system: Return pressure spray system at 45 psi (310 kPa)

==== Performance ====
- Maximum thrust: 3,300 lbf (14.68 kN)
- Overall pressure ratio: 6.7:1
- Air mass flow: 50.5 lb (22.9 kg) per second
- Turbine inlet temperature: 872 °C (1,602 °F; 1,145 K)
- Specific fuel consumption: 0.89 lb/lbf (91 kg/kN) per hour
- Thrust-to-weight ratio: 7.05

== See also ==
Related development

- Pratt & Whitney T73

Comparable engines

- Fairchild J83
- General Electric J85
- Ishikawajima-Harima J3
- Rolls-Royce RB.108
- Rolls-Royce RB.145
- Rolls-Royce RB.162
- Rolls-Royce Soar
- Armstrong Siddeley Viper

Related lists

- List of aircraft engines
