= Aerial crane =

Type of helicopter used to lift heavy or large loads

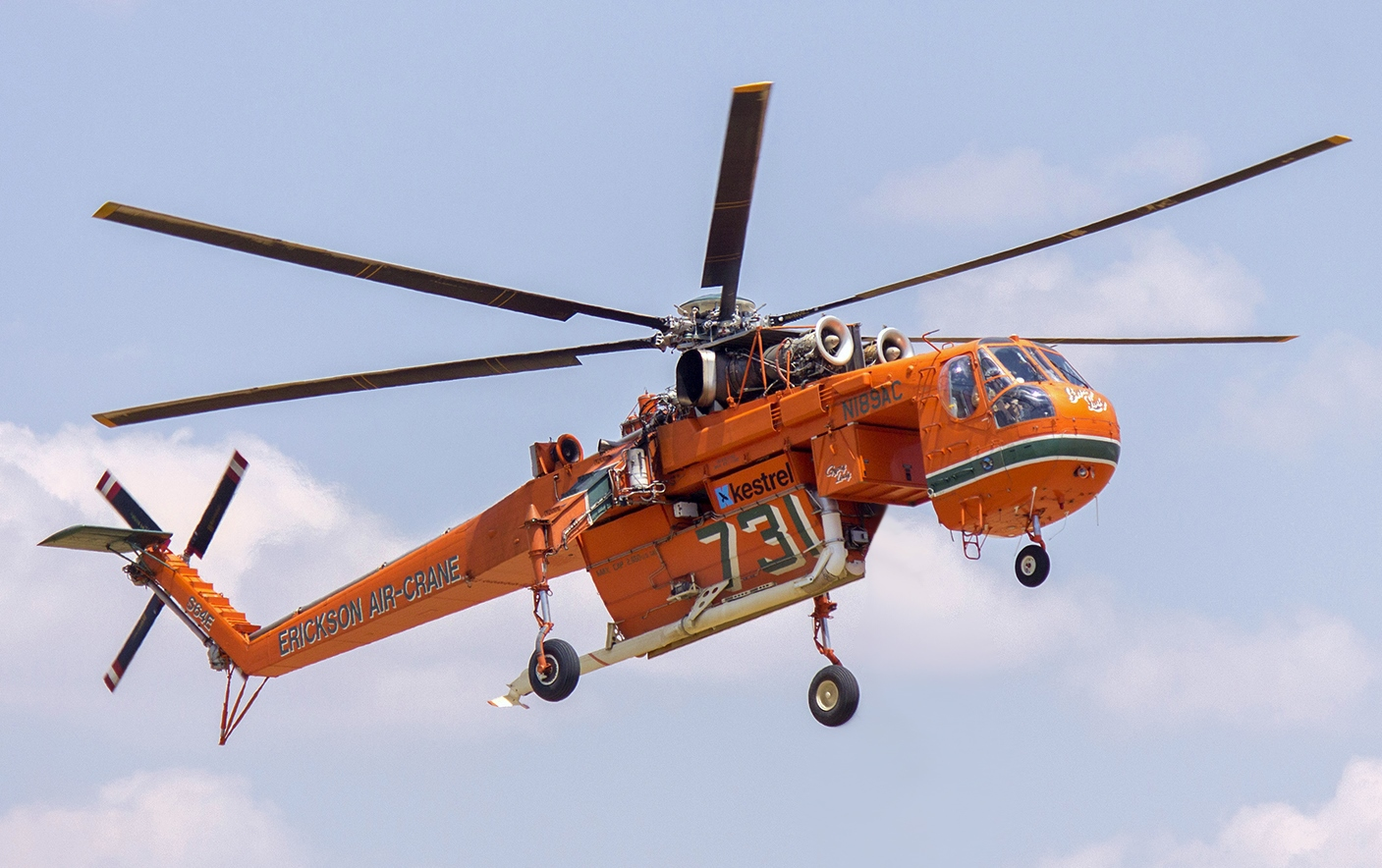
The Sikorsky S-64 Skycrane has been in service for over five decades

An aerial crane or flying crane is a helicopter used to lift heavy or awkward loads. As aerial cranes, helicopters carry loads connected to long cables or slings in order to place heavy equipment when other methods are not available or economically feasible, or when the job must be accomplished in remote or inaccessible areas, such as the tops of tall buildings or the top of a hill or mountain, far from the nearest road. Helicopters were first used as aerial cranes in the 1950s, but it was not until the 1960s that their popularity in construction and other industries began to catch on. The most consistent use of helicopters as aerial cranes is in the logging industry to lift large trees out of rugged terrain where vehicles are not able to reach, or where environmental concerns prohibit roadbuilding. These operations are referred to as longline because of the long, single sling line used to carry the load.

== History ==
Bell 47 helicopters were the first, lightweight aerial cranes to be used in the early 1950s. It was never capable of carrying more than a few hundred pounds of cargo. In the 1960s, the Sikorsky S-58 replaced the Bell 47 because of its larger power margin. Even today, S-58s can be found carrying medium-size loads. The 1960s also brought the Bell 211 HueyTug, a specially produced commercial version of the UH-1C for lifting medium loads, and even the popular Bell 206 was used for light loads. But there continued to be a demand for aircraft able to lift even larger loads

Larger helicopters became commercially available after the Vietnam War as helicopter manufacturers focused on selling commercial versions of their military aircraft. For instance, Boeing Vertol Model 107 and Model 234 aircraft have been used to carry even heavier payloads than their lighter predecessors. But the heaviest loads required a pure aerial crane. The answer came from Sikorsky's S-64 Skycrane. Originally produced for the military as the CH-54 Tarhe for heavy lifting of downed aircraft and artillery pieces, the S-64 Skycrane was nothing more than just enough airframe to attach two powerful engines, the main and tail rotors and transmissions, a cockpit, and a cargo hook and winch system.

Skycranes were used in 1972 when the Chesapeake Bay Bridge connecting Maryland and the Eastern Shore was being built to bring concrete and other supplies to the construction site. In 1993, an Erickson aerial Skycrane, normally used for hauling lumber in Oregon, was used to remove the Statue of Freedom from the top of the Capitol dome in Washington, D.C. The statue was placed on the ground while it was being cleaned and restored before being gently returned to the top of the dome, once again with a Skycrane.

== Purpose-designed aircraft ==
- Boeing Vertol XCH-62
- Kaman K-MAX
- Kamov Ka-27
- Mil Mi-10
- Sikorsky CH-37 Mojave
- Sikorsky CH-54 Tarhe
- Sikorsky S-64 Skycrane
