= Yuri Garnaev =

Famous soviet test pilot

- Born: Yuri Aleksandrovich Garnaev; 17 December [O.S. 4 December] 1917; Balashov, RSFSR
- Died: 6 August 1967 (aged 49); Le Rove, France
- Military career
- Allegiance: Soviet Union
- Branch: Soviet Air Force
- Service years: 1938 — 1945
- Rank: Captain
- Conflicts: Soviet–Japanese War
- Awards: Hero of the Soviet Union
- Other work: test pilot

Yuri Aleksandrovich Garnaev (Russian: Юрий Александрович Гарнаев; 17 December [O.S. 4 December] 1917 – 6 August 1967) was a famous Soviet test pilot of the Gromov Flight Research Institute who died in a helicopter crash while combating wildfires in France.

== Early life ==
Garnaev was born on 17 December [O.S. 4 December] 1917 in Balashov to a working-class Russian family. Having moved to the village of Lopasnya (located within present-day Chekhov) in 1934, he went on to complete his third semester at the Podolsk Industrial Technical School in the Moscow oblast before quitting in 1936 due to financial difficulties. He soon got a job at the Lianozovsky Car Repair factory, where he worked while attending the Mytishchi aeroclub. On 17 June 1937 he made his first solo flight before being drafted into the military the next year.

== Aviation career ==
After graduating from the Engels Military Aviation School in 1939 he was sent to a fighter aviation unit in Transbaikalia. From 1940 to 1942 he worked as a flight instructor in Ulan-Ude before returning to a combat regiment. In 1945 he briefly saw combat in the Soviet–Japanese War as a navigator in the 718th Fighter Aviation Regiment, making eleven sorties in a Yak-9 during the conflict. Later that year he was sentenced to a prison in Voroshilov for carelessly handling classified documents, but he was released early in October 1948. He then got a job in 1949 as a technician at the Gromov Flight Research Institute, where he participated in the development of a mid-air refueling system before he was fired in 1950 because of his past conviction. However, he was soon allowed to return to the institute as a test parachutist in January 1951, which led to the kickstart of the test pilot career in December 1951. He went on to conduct a variety of test flights, flying various experimental aircraft and helicopters. In 1957 he became the first person the fly the Rafaelyants Turbolet, and as part of the training of cosmonauts to handle zero-gravity environments in 1960 he flew a modified Tu-104 with Amet-khan Sultan. His life was saved not once but twice by his parachute while conducting test flights, in 1962 during a Mi-6 flight and later in 1964 while flying a Ka-22. Throughout his career he conducted tests on various aircraft including the An-10, Il-28, Ka-22, Mi-3, Mi-4, Mi-6, Mi-10, MiG-15, MiG-21, Tu-14, Tu-16, and Tu-104. His life was cut short on 6 August 1967; he was killed in the line of duty when piloting an Mi-6PZh helicopter (registration number СССР-06174) over France to fight forest fires. The cause of the crash remains unclear.

== Awards and honors ==
- Hero of the Soviet Union (21 August 1964)
- Honoured Test Pilot of the USSR (21 August 1964)
- Order of Lenin (21 August 1964)
- Order of the Patriotic War 1st class (28 August 1945)
- Order of the Red Banner of Labour (12 July 1957)

== Memorials ==
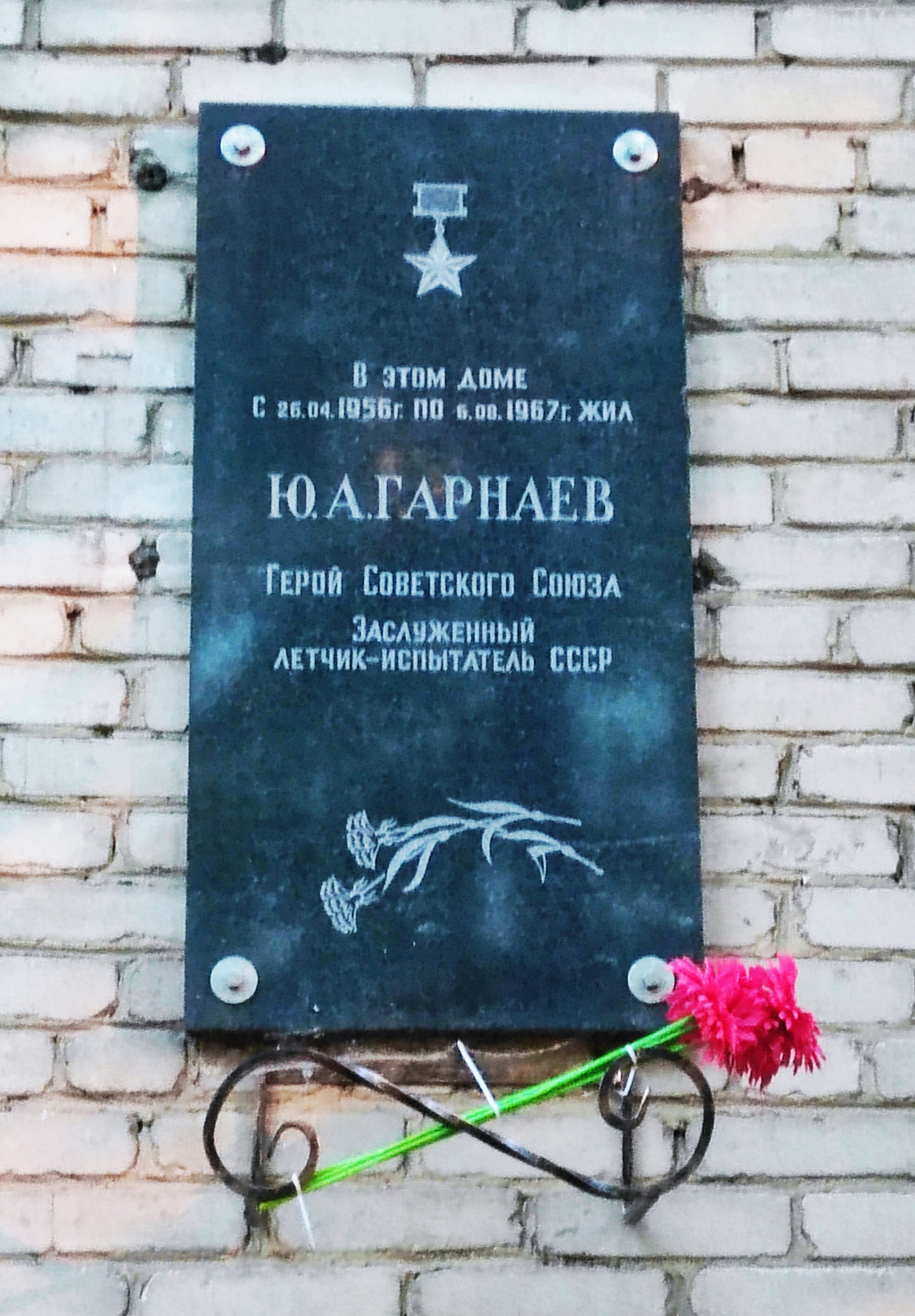
Yuri Garnaev commemorative plaque in Zhukovsky, Russia

- Garnaev is buried at the memorial Novodevichy Cemetery in Moscow
- There is a memorial plate installed on the wall of building 6, Lomonosov Street in Zhukovsky, Russia
