= V16 =

V16 may refer to:

== Aircraft ==
- Fokker V.16, a German experimental aircraft
- Mil V-16, a Soviet helicopter
- McDonnell Douglas AV-16, a proposed ground-attack aircraft

== Other uses ==
- Cadillac V-16, an American car
- V16 engine, a sixteen-cylinder engine
- V16 warning beacon lights
- V16, a grade in bouldering
- V16, a family history of malignant neoplasm, in the ICD-9 V codes
- Nissan V16, the name adopted in Chile for the Nissan Sentra
