= MI16 (disambiguation) =

MI-16, MI16, MI 16 or variant may refer to:

- MI16, British Military Intelligence Section 16
- Mil Mi-16 a.k.a. Mil V-16, helicopter
- Michigan's 16th congressional district
- U.S. Route 16 in Michigan, highway
- Some DOHC 16 valve versions of PSA_XU, XU9 and XU10
