= Yakovlev Yak-60 =

Experimental helicopter design

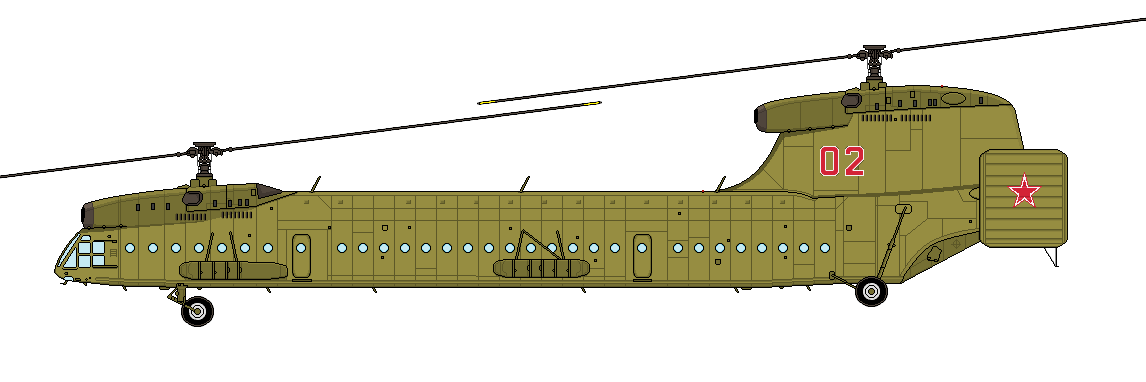
Yak-60

Yakovlev Yak-60 (known as Yak-32 in some sources) is the possible designation for an experimental Yakovlev tandem-rotor heavy-lift helicopter design of the late 1960s. This design never progressed beyond the model stage.

== Development ==
This helicopter was designed in the late 1960s, and may have been a competing design to the Mil Mi-12 heavy lift helicopter. It featured two Mil Mi-6 rotors in tandem, each driven by a pair of 6,500 hp (4,800 kW) Soloviev D-25VF engines, potentially giving it four times the payload capacity of the Boeing CH-47 Chinook. The cockpit would have been similar to that of the Yakovlev Yak-24. Compared to the radical Mi-12, the Yak-60 design was far more conventional, though two Mi-12s were produced and no Yak-60s.

It has been suggested that the designation Yak-60 was based on an extant study model which had the number "60" painted prominently on its side.

== Specifications (Yak-60 estimated) ==
Data from

General characteristics

- Crew: three
- Capacity: 42 t (93,000 lb) of cargo
- Length: 46 m (150 ft 11 in)
- Empty weight: 55,000 kg (121,254 lb)
- Max takeoff weight: 100,000 kg (220,462 lb)
- Powerplant: 4 × Soloviev D-25VF turboshaft engines in pairs for each rotor, 4,800 kW (6,500 shp) each
- Main rotor diameter: 2 × 35 m (114 ft 10 in)

Performance

== See also ==
- Yakovlev VVP-6
- Mil V-12
