= Help Flash =

Signaling device

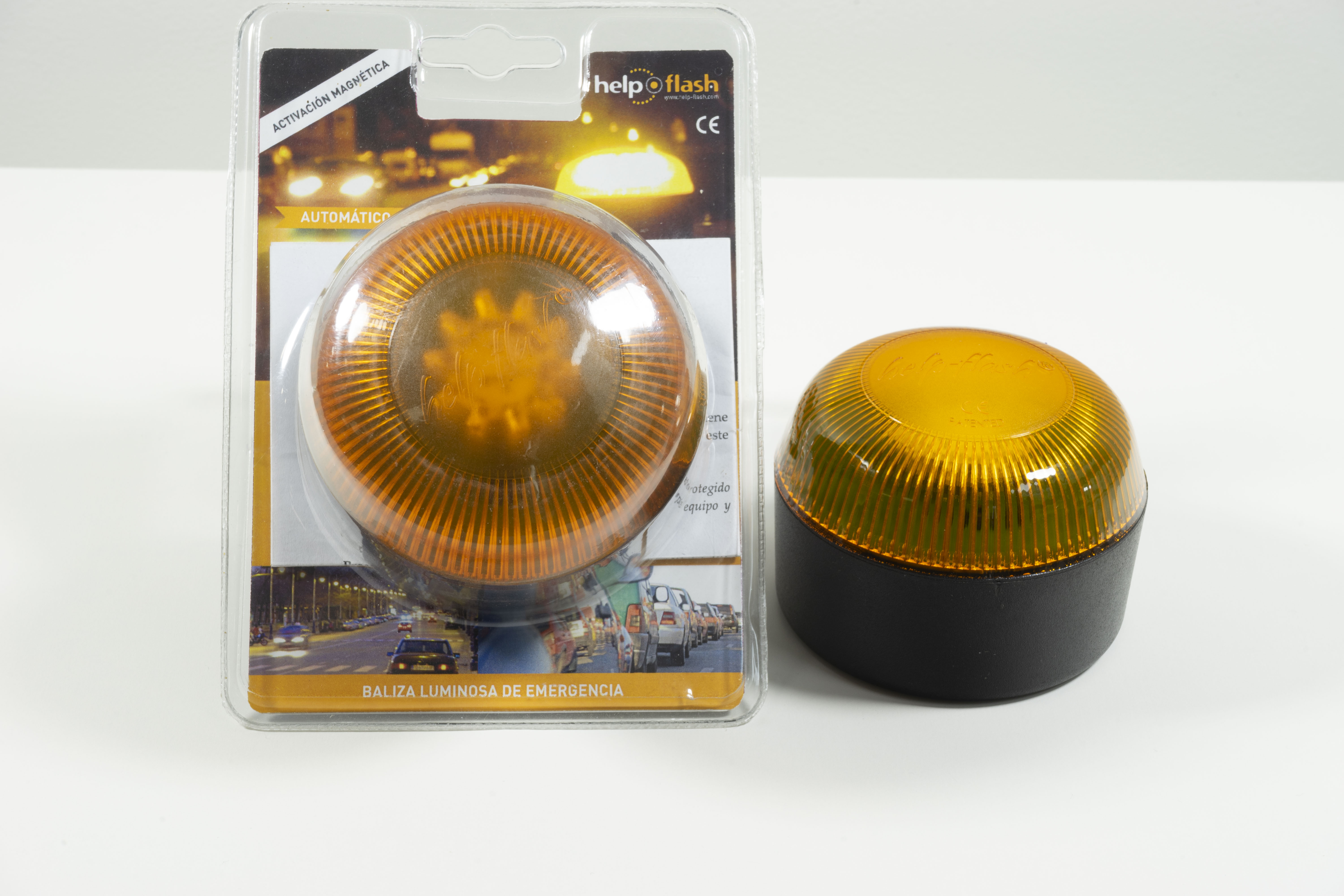
A Help Flah device with its pack

Help Flash is a signaling device for road safety to be used in the event of breakdowns, accidents or when vehicles need to stop on the road. It has been a pioneer among official V16 warning beacon lights, the emergency light signals for automobiles. It stands out from other beacons due to its automatic ignition by magnetism: the flashing light is activated upon contact with the metal of the vehicle's roof.

In Spain the official V16 warning beacon lights came into force on July 31, 2018, when an amendment to the General Vehicle Regulations was officially published. On July 1, 2021, these signs became legal substitutes for the emergency triangle, and are scheduled to definitively replace the triangles in 2026.

Help Flash is a product manufactured by Netun Solutions, a Spanish company located in Vigo that provides several technological solutions for mobility.

== Description ==
Help Flash is a circular, cordless, luminous beacon that is placed in a visible location in the event of an emergency. In the case of four-wheeled vehicles, it is placed on the roof of the vehicle without getting out, in less than 30 seconds. It can be activated manually or automatically by contact with a metal surface. With intense yellow flashing, it warns other vehicles. It has a range of 1 km and 360º visibility in all weather conditions.

It is small in size - less than 10 centimeters in diameter and weighs less than 100 grams - and can be stored under the seat of the motorcycle, in the glove compartment or in the interior space of the vehicle doors.

The beacon fulfills the technical requirements and has been recommended by the Spanish Dirección General de Tráfico (DGT) and the Europe by Data Road Safety. It is approved by the Official Accredited Applus Laboratory.

== History ==
The invention was developed by two Galician entrepreneurs, Jorge Torre and Jorge Costas; at 2016 began to be sold. From its beginnings it had the backing and recognition of the automotive and safety sector.

Jorge Torre, with a clear vocation as an inventor, had been thinking about solving the high accident rate due to vehicle breakdowns or accidents on the road since 2006. In 2015 he created the Help Flash prototype and teamed up with Jorge Costas, who was in charge of the commercial side. Thus was born the first V16 warning light, a product that did not exist before.

The project was developed in cooperation with the Galician Automotive Technology Center (CTAG), based in O Porriño. In 2018 the product was approved by Applus, one of the world's leading companies in the inspection, testing and certification sector.

Information about the usefulness and functionality of the product quickly spread informally among individuals and companies, involving many automobile professionals and associations of traffic victims.

That same year several administrations recognized the V16 warning beacon lights approved by the DGT as the most efficient way to reduce the accident rate associated with vehicle breakdowns or accidents; so they were included in the reform of the General Vehicle Regulations through Ministerial Order PCI/810/2018.

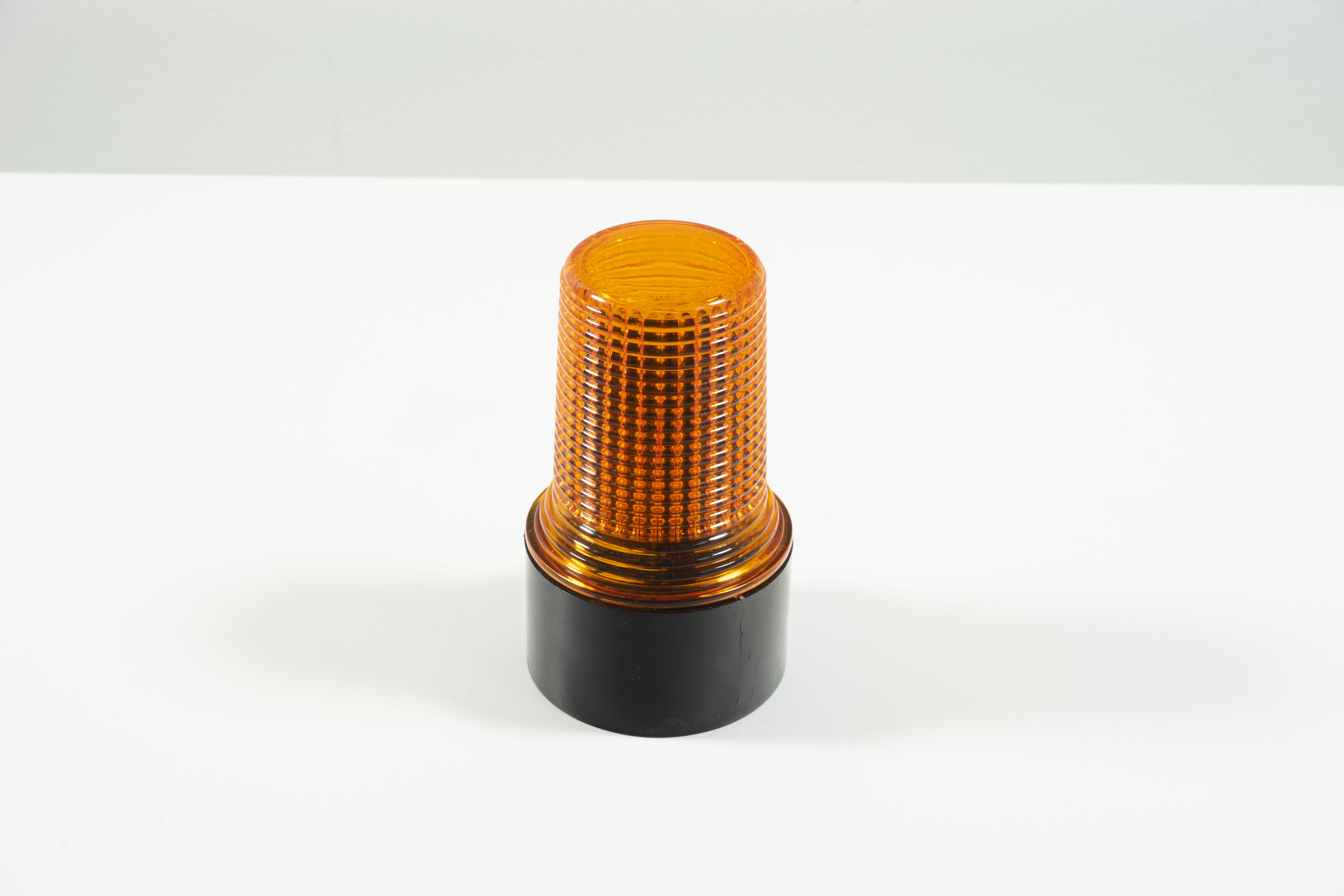
1998. First Functional Prototype

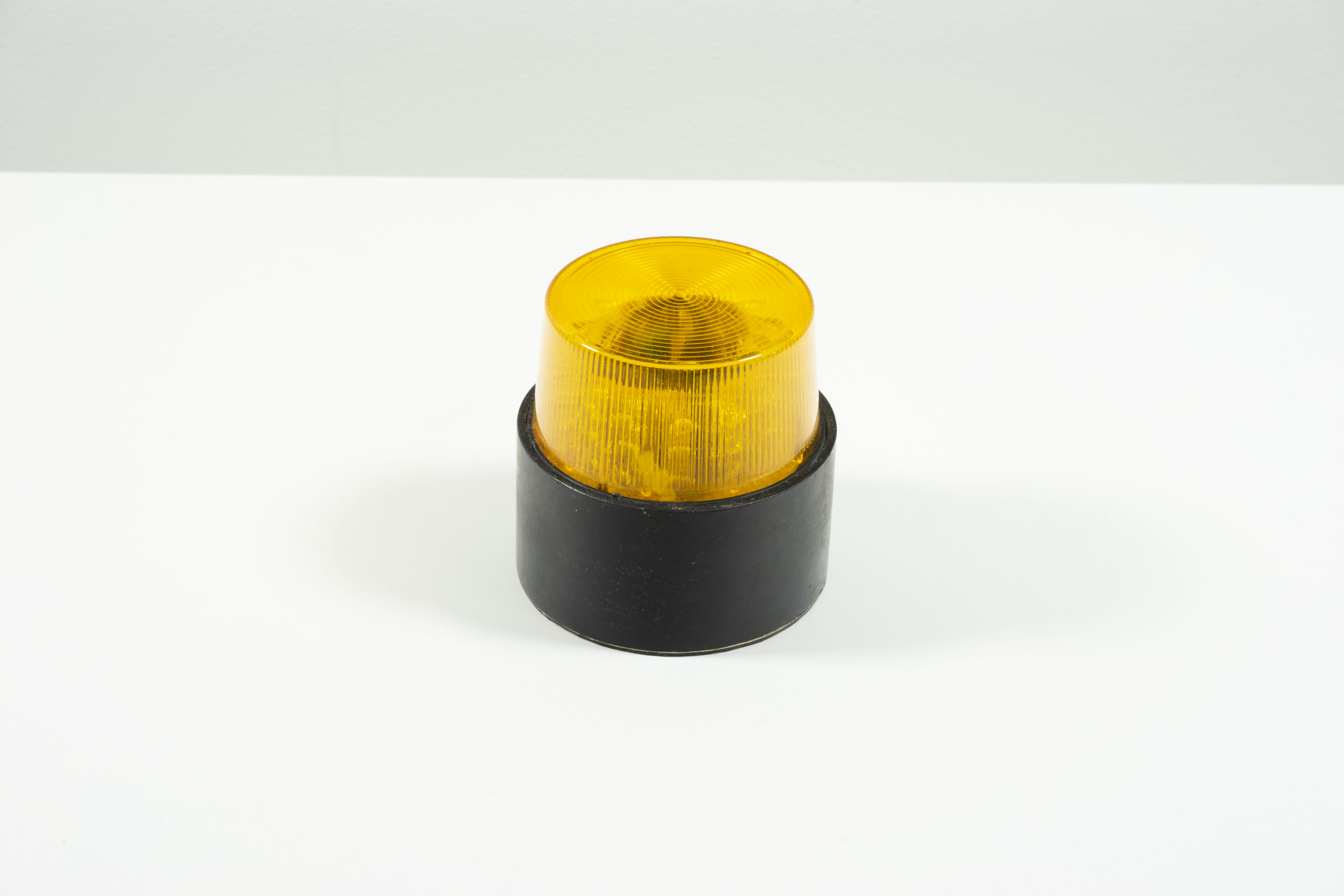
2001, Prototype testing of light power, climate, and magnetic induction

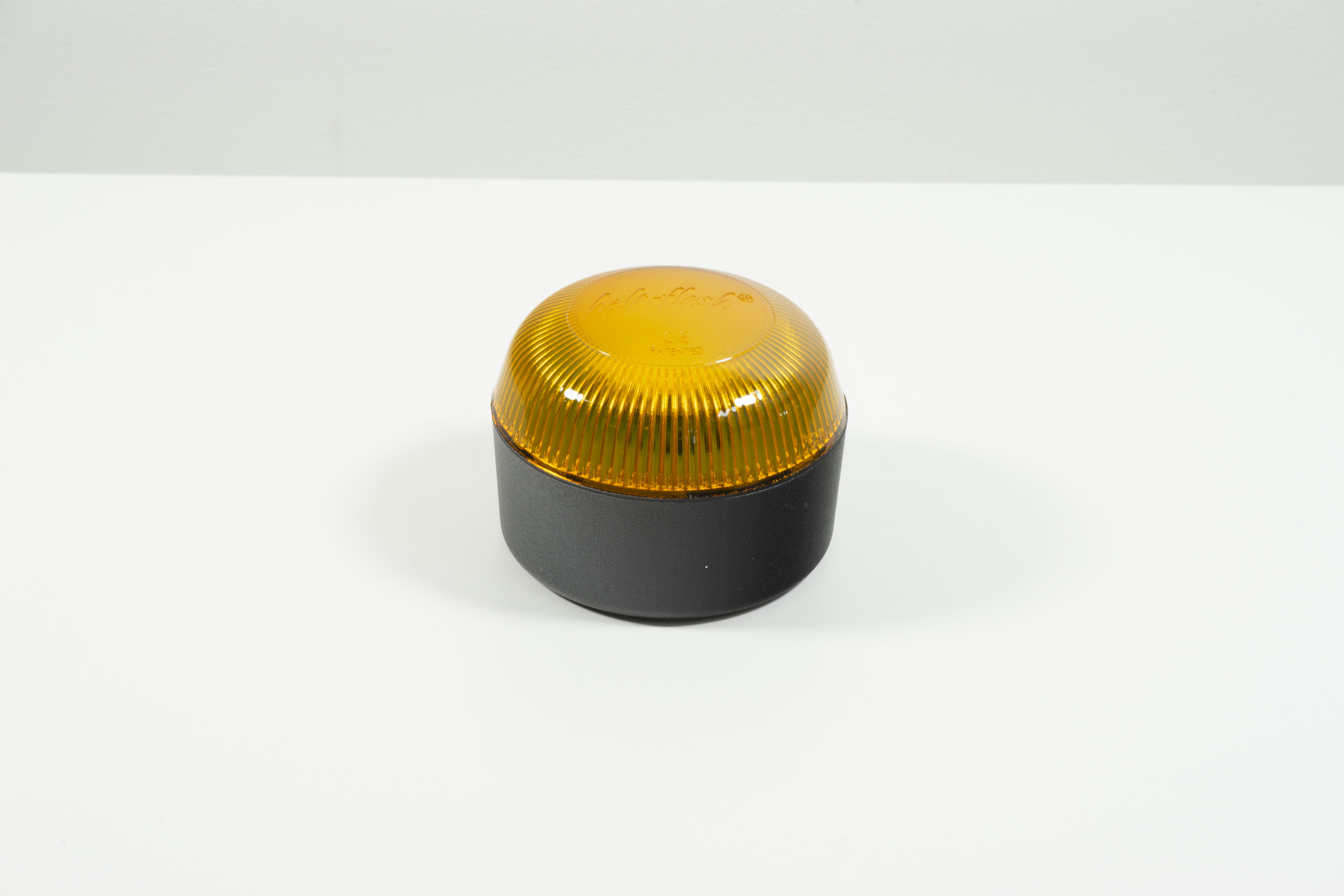
2009, Help Flash Piccolo

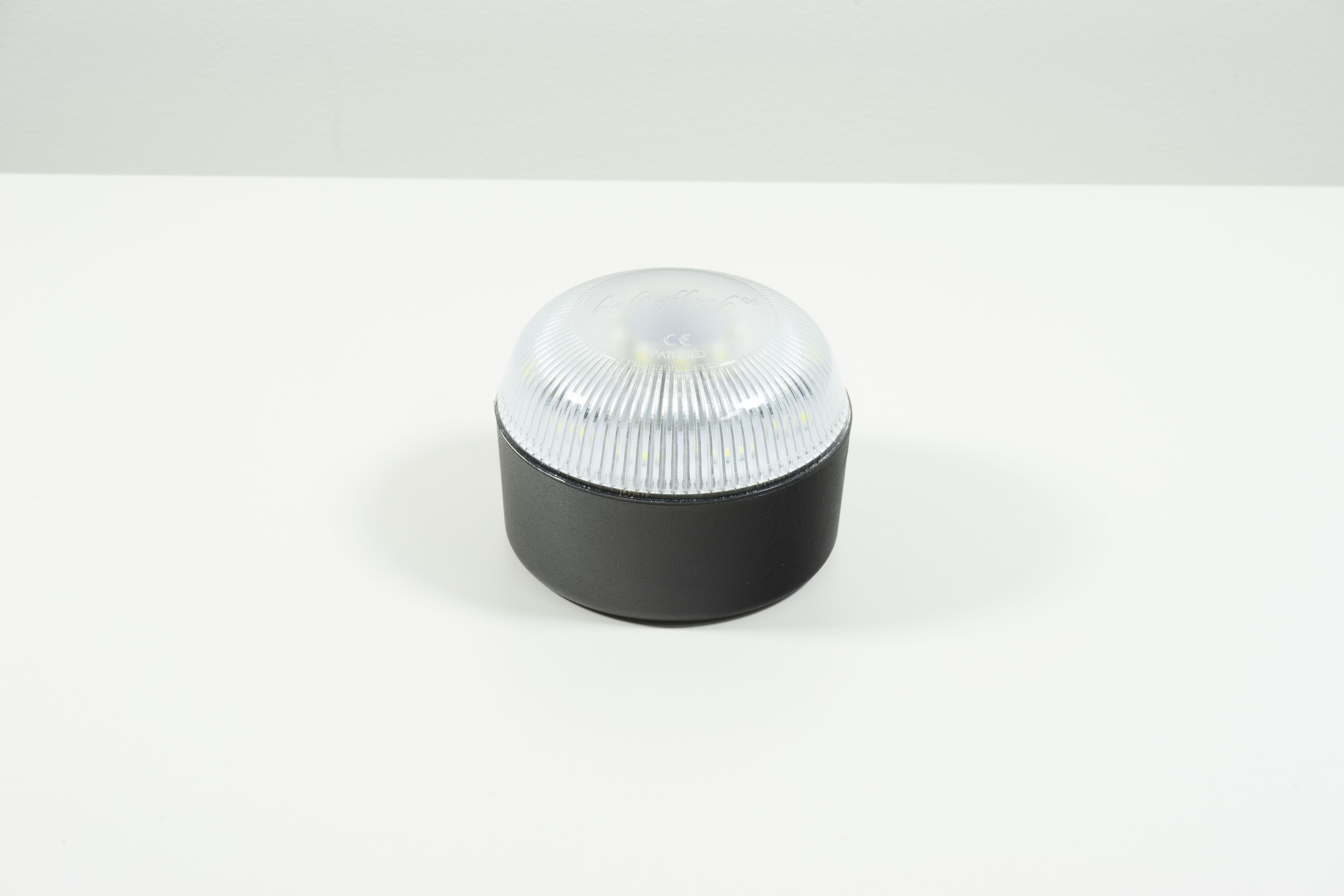
2013, Help Flash Piccolo Comby

In 2020, the first connected V16 warning beacon light was launched, the Help Flash Smart, connecting with emergency or roadside assistance services via the Incidence app. In 2021 Help Flash 2.0 was launched, and Royal Decree 159/2021 approved the replacement of the triangle by V16 warning beacon lights, that by 2026 will be directly connected to the DGT. The most advanced product, Help Flash IoT, has been developed between Vodafone and Netun Solutions, and will be manufactured in Spain like the other company's devices.

== Devices ==
There are several models of Help Flash, both in conventional and connected versions.

=== Help Flash V2.0 ===
It is a conventional V16 warning beacon light: a power switch allows to set mode, perform a battery test and activate the device with one hand. Can also be used as a lamp or flashlight. With a life of 2.5 hours in emergency mode and 5 hours as a constant light, it has enough autonomy. Powered by one 9V 6LR61 alkaline battery.

=== Help Flash Smart ===
The device in connection with the smartphone and the App Incidence, communicates directly with the insurance company and emergency services and reports the location of the vehicle. Like the original device, it features push-button functionality for use as a lamp and uses the same type of alkaline battery.

=== Help Flash IoT ===
In addition to the emergency signal functionality, it integrates NB-IoT technology that will allow other vehicles on the road to know the exact location of the breakdown or accident. The problem will be reflected on variable information panels, navigators and future V27 signs, significantly reducing the chances of a hit and run or impact. While the geolocation system is activated, the device sends the location to the DGT 3.0 cloud, and will share it in anonymous form with vehicles and infrastructures.

== Recognitions ==
- Innovation Gallery Awards at MOTORTEC 2017.
- III Edition of the Entrepreneurs and Road Safety Award of FUNDACIÓN LÍNEA DIRECTA, 2017.
- 4th Edition AXA Opensurance Insurtech, 2017.
- CNAE Foundation Award, 2017.
