= Mil V-16 =

1960s Soviet heavy transport helicopter project

V-16

General information
- Type: Heavy transport helicopter project
- National origin: USSR
- Manufacturer: Mil
- Primary user: USSR

History
- Developed from: Mil V-12

The Mil V-16 was a Soviet heavy cargo/transport helicopter project of the late 1960s. The Mil V-16 was designed by Mil Design Bureau, a Moscow helicopter plant. The original scheme described a heavy side-by-side twin-rotor aircraft with two Soloviev D-25VF gas turbine engines below six-bladed rotors at the tips of heavily supported wings on each side of the fuselage and tricycle-type landing gear, with both rear landing wheels mounted below the wings while the front wheel was located below the cockpit, as well as located directly under the wings.

Designed to be capable of transporting large numbers of combat units, the V-16 was also intended as a Soviet military vehicle transportation aircraft. This aircraft was one of the first for the USSR to begin using operational based algorithms within its controlling systems.

== Variants ==
V-16
Proposed ultra-heavy version of the Mil V-12, intended to lift 40,000 to 50,000 kg (88,000 to 110,000 lb). Originally envisaged in a three rotor layout, powered by six Soloviev D-25VF engines, but reverted to a two-rotor system similar to the V-12 powered by two large gas generators supplying a single large low pressure free-turbine driving a main gearbox each.
Mi-16
The proposed VVS designation for the production V-16.

== Specifications (V-16) ==
General characteristics (planned):

Length: 37 m (121 ft 5 in)
Wingspan: 67 m (219 ft 10 in) across rotors
Height: 12.5 m (41 ft)
Empty Weight: 69,100 kg
Gross Weight: 97,000 kg
Max Takeoff Weight: 105,000 kg

- Freight compartment: 28.15×4.4×4.4 m (92.4×14.4×14.4 ft)
