= Yakovlev VVP-6 =

Experimental design for a flying support and surface-to-air missile platform

General information
- Type: Multi-rotor flying platform
- National origin: USSR
- Manufacturer: Yakovlev

The Yakovlev VVP-6 was an experimental design for a flying support and surface-to-air missile platform, capable of vertical takeoff and landing. It never progressed beyond the model stage.

== Development ==
Perhaps the most radical design ever to emerge from the Yakovlev OKB studio, the VVP-6 appeared more science fiction than a craft likely to have seen production. The VVP-6 was designed as a giant VTOL support platform which would work in coordination with VTOL jets, such as Yakovlev's Yak-38.

Among the many functions envisioned for this line of vehicles was the transportation of food, fuel and munitions. The huge, box-like design was to have been 49m long. In one version it was capable of carrying a complete SAM missile system, including six SA-2 (ASCC name "Guideline") missiles with launchers mounted on the craft's upper surface. Reloads and supporting radars were to be stored internally.

The VVP-6 was to have been fitted with six six-blade rotors mounted on six pylons extending from the craft's sides. Each rotor was to have been driven by four turboshaft engines, giving the VVP-6 a total of 24 engines.

The requirement for such a craft ended when the Soviet Air Force failed to put land-based VTOL jets into service.

== See also ==
- Yakovlev Yak-60
- Mil V-12
