= Hotelicopter =

Viral video

Hotelicopter is an April Fools' Day video produced as a viral marketing campaign in 2009 by Hotelicopter, a hotel meta search site that has since been purchased by RoomKey. It showed a craft based on the Soviet giant Mil V-12 military helicopter, leading millions to believe the world's first luxury hotel/helicopter was a reality. The video and website explained the first commercial flight of Hotelicopter was scheduled to take off on 26 June 2009 from JFK Airport in New York City and reach the UK later that August.

In 2010, the Christian Science Monitor named the Hotelicopter as one of its top five online April Fools' pranks. The Times also included the prank in its "10 best travel April fools," rating it as a 10/10.
