= V16 warning beacon lights =

Spanish device for cars

V16 warning beacon
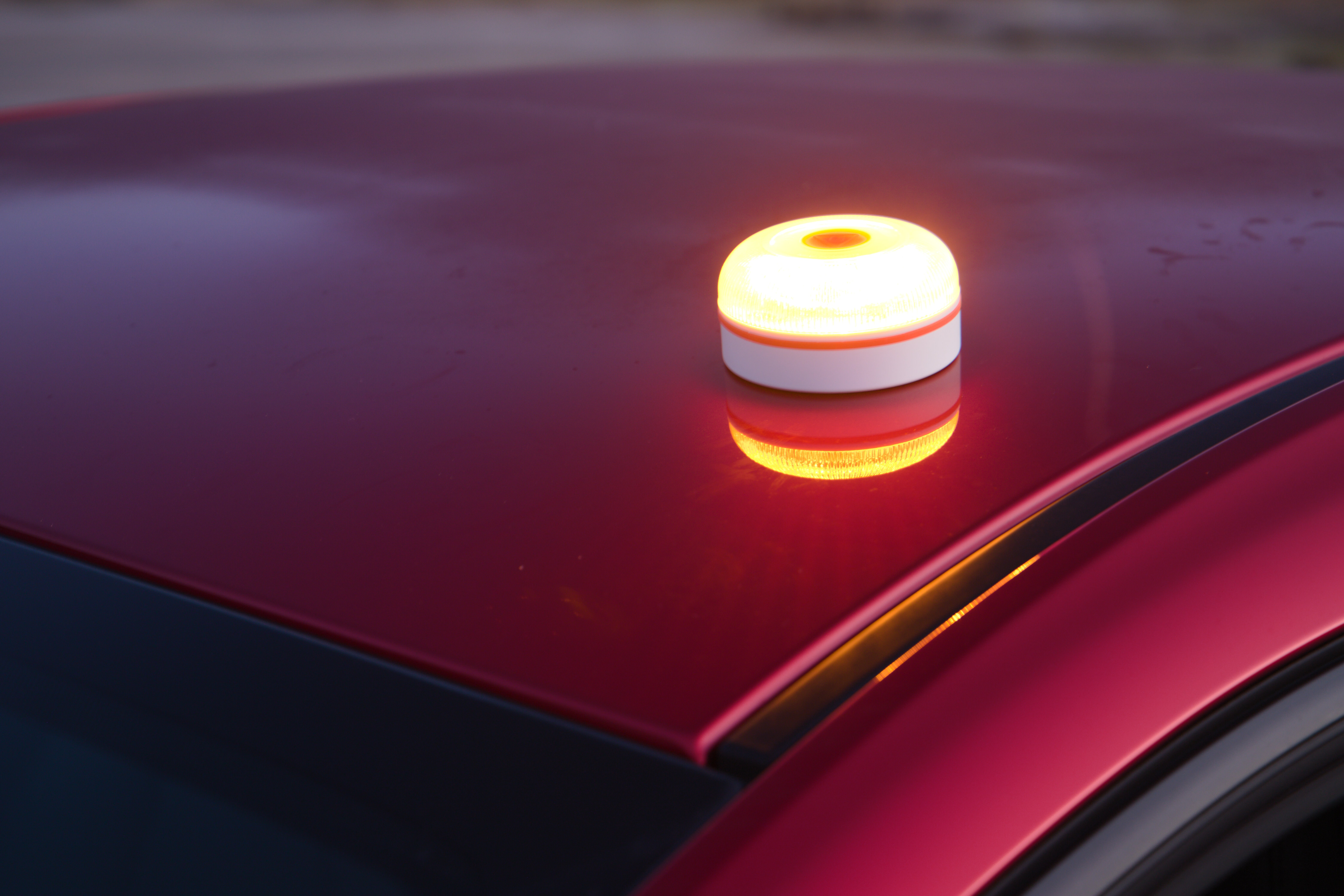
- V16 lit up warning beacon lights
- Type: Vehicle warning device

V16 is the official name used in Spain for a warning beacon light. It is designed to be placed on the roof of a vehicle without the driver needing to exit, making the vehicle immediately visible in the event of an accident or breakdown.

The use of warning beacon lights came into force on 1 July 2021, during a transitional period in which both the traditional warning triangle and conventional V16 lights may be used until January 2026. After that date, the only legal roadside warning device in Spain will be the V16 beacon light equipped with integrated geolocation and connectivity to the DGT 3.0 cloud.

== Description ==
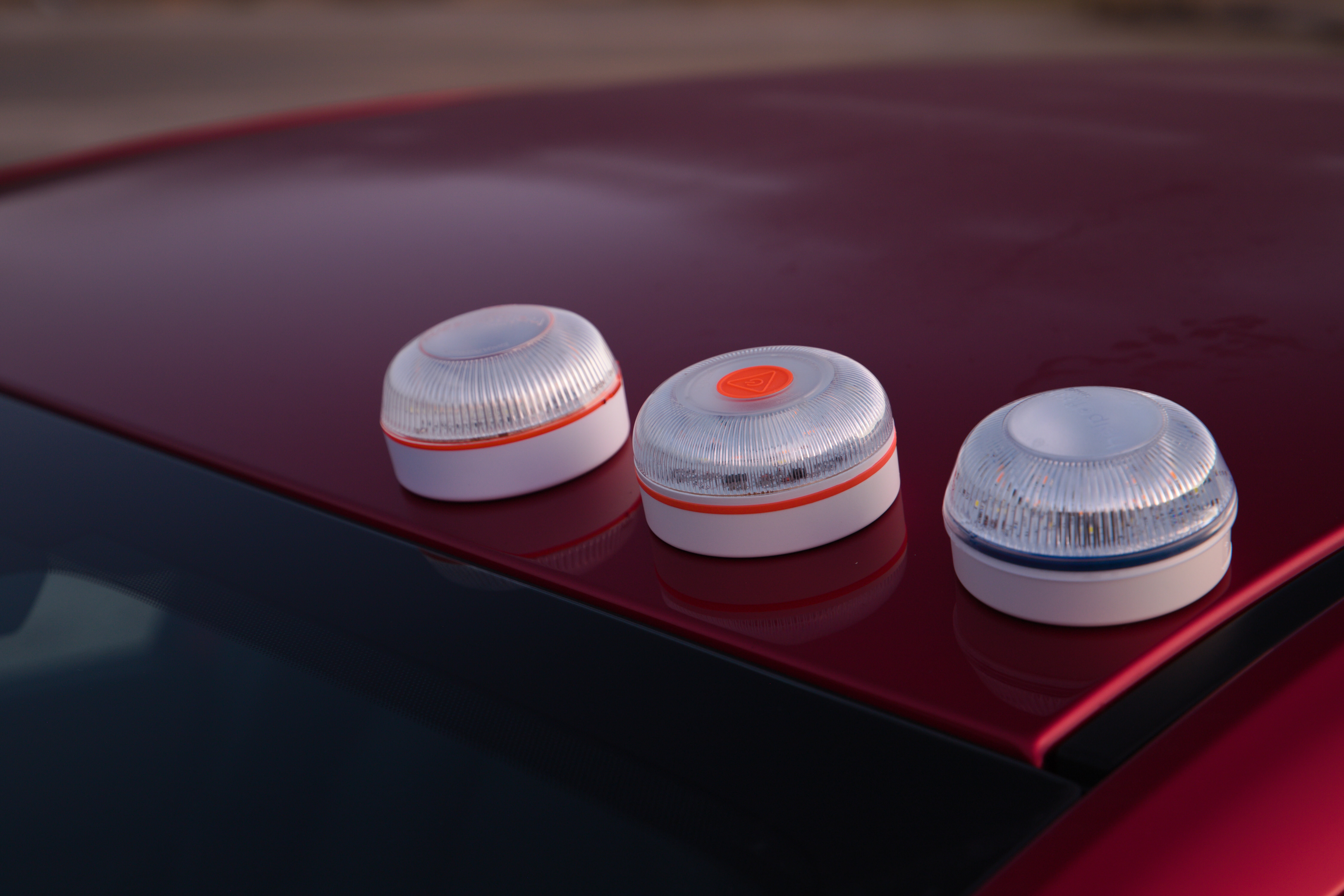
Various types of V16 beacon lights

V16 devices are yellow flashing warning lights that are placed on the roof of a vehicle without the driver exiting it. The light provides a 360-degree horizontal field of visibility, with a vertical visibility of at least ±8 degrees. The device has an autonomous power supply, is unwired, and is activated via a button or internal battery designed to guarantee operation after 18 months.

The V16 beacon must display a visible and durable approval code, either LCOE XXXXXXXXXXXXXXXXG1 or IDIADA PC XXXXXXXXXXXX. In these codes, the letter X is replaced by the approval date and the serial number.

== Regulation ==
Vehicle signaling regulations vary across European countries and are subject to periodic revision. In Spain, legislation has progressively favored the use of V16 devices as a safer alternative to warning triangles. The use of connected V16 devices will become mandatory in 2026.

== History ==
The V16 beacon was created by Galician inventor Jorge Torre who, aware of the high accident rate on the road due to vehicle breakdowns or accidents, had been looking for a solution to reduce the number of deaths and injuries. In 2015, Torre created the first prototype and teamed up with Jorge Costas, also an entrepreneur, to launch the first brand of V16 devices: Help Flash.

In 2018, following the commercialization of the product, several Spanish administrations recognized the V16 lights, which were approved by the DGT as the most efficient for reducing the accident rate associated with vehicle stops on the road due to breakdown or accident; they were therefore included in the Reform of the Vehicle Regulations through Ministerial Order PCI/810/2018.

In March 2021, Royal Decree 159/2021 was approved for the replacement of the triangle by V16 type signs, which in 2026 will be directly connected to the DGT 3.0 cloud.

== Related links ==
- Royal Decree 159/2021, regulating roadside assistance services.
- Light V16 DGT: answers to the five questions we all ask ourselves.
