= Kamov Ka-22 =

Soviet experimental gyrodyne

Ka-22
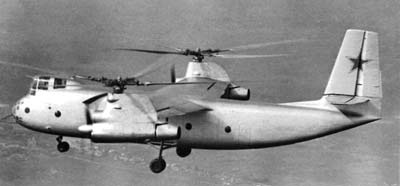

General information
- Type: Transport Gyrodyne
- National origin: Soviet Union
- Manufacturer: Kamov
- Designer: Vladimir Barshevsky
- Number built: 4

History
- First flight: 15 August 1959
- Retired: 12 August 1964

The Kamov Ka-22 Vintokryl (rotor-wing, or literally, (air)screw-wing) (Cyrillic: Камов Ка-22 Винтокрыл) (NATO reporting name: Hoop) was a rotorcraft developed by Kamov for the Soviet Air Force. The experimental transport aircraft combined the capabilities of a helicopter for vertical take-off and landing with those of a fixed-wing aircraft for cruise. The Ka-22 carried a large payload, having a hold comparable in size to the Antonov An-12. Eight world records for altitude and speed were set by the Ka-22 in its class, none of which have since been broken.

== Development ==
In order to increase the effective range of a helicopter, Kamov designer Vladimir Barshevsky drew up a design for a helicopter with wings and an aeroplane propulsive system. In 1954 a proposal was agreed to produce three Ka-22s. The programme was delayed and on 28 March 1956 prototypes 2 and 3 were cancelled. The Ka-22 first lifted from the ground on 17 June 1959, and made its first untethered flight on 15 August 1959. Serious control difficulties were encountered, leading to orders being postponed until the problems were solved, and in July 1960 an order was received to manufacture three more Ka-22s.

== Design ==
The Ka-22 was in essence a fixed-wing aircraft with rotors fitted above the wing tips. An engine was mounted on each wing tip, with drive to both a four-bladed tractor propeller and a four-bladed main rotor. The original prototype was powered by 5,900shp Kuznetsov TV-2VK engines, although these were later replaced by the 5,500shp Soloviev D-25VK. The fuselage contained three-seat cockpit above the glazed nose and a main cargo area large enough to contain 80 seats or 16.5 tonnes of cargo. The entire nose could swing open to starboard for loading bulky items. In helicopter mode, the propeller drive was disconnected, and the flaps were lowered to 90 degrees. In fixed-wing mode, the lifting rotors were free to windmill, and the aircraft was controlled by the ailerons and tail surfaces. The twin-wheel landing gear was fixed.

== Operational history ==
During its short operational history, a total of eight world records were set by the Ka-22, piloted by D.K. Yefremov and V.V. Gromov. In the 1961 Soviet Aviation Day, this aircraft was on display, making its first public appearance. On 7 October 1961, with spats over the wheels and a fairing behind the cockpit, a class speed record was set at 356.3 km/h. The spats and fairing were then removed and on 24 November 1961 a payload of 16,485 kg was lifted to 2,557 m.

On 28 August 1962, while on an intermediate stop during a ferry flight to Moscow for acceptance testing, Ka-22 01-01 rolled to the left and crashed inverted, killing the entire crew. The cause was found to be the starboard rotor collective pitch control linkage, and further inspection found that two of the other three Ka-22s suffered from similar problems. Subsequently, in order to improve stability and control, a complex differential autopilot was installed. This sensed attitude and angular accelerations, and fed into the control system.

On 12 August 1964, while involved in Soviet Air Force testing, 01-03 was destroyed. The aircraft entered an uncontrolled turn to the right, and in efforts to correct the Ka-22 pitched into a steep dive. The order was given to abandon the aircraft, and three of the crew survived, but Col S.G. Brovtsev, who was flying, and technician A.F. Rogov, were killed.

After this, the Ka-22 was abandoned, with the Mil Mi-6 having already taken on the heavy helicopter role. Eventually the two surviving machines, 01-02 and 01-04, were scrapped. The Ka-22 was only seen once by western observers during the Cold War during an Aviation Day display in Moscow on 9 July 1961.

== Specifications (Ka-22) ==
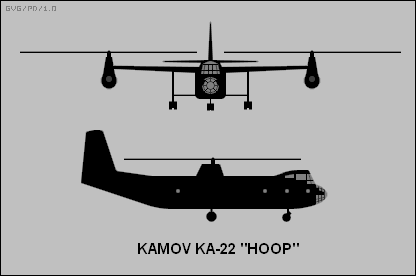
Kamov Ka-22

Data from

General characteristics

- Capacity: 100 passengers
- Length: 27 m (88 ft 7 in)
- Wingspan: 22.5 m (73 ft 10 in) fixed wing
- Wing area: 105 m^{2} (1,130 sq ft)
- Empty weight: 28,200 kg (62,170 lb)
- Gross weight: 35,500 kg (78,264 lb) VTO
- Max takeoff weight: 42,500 kg (93,696 lb) STO
- Powerplant: 2 × Soloviev D-25VK turboshaft engines, 4,045 kW (5,424 hp) each
- Main rotor diameter: 2 × 20 m (65 ft 7 in)
- Main rotor area: 795.2 m^{2} (8,559 sq ft) total
- Propellers: 4-bladed Variable-pitch propellers

Performance

- Maximum speed: 375 km/h (233 mph, 202 kn)
- Range: 450 km (280 mi, 240 nmi)
- Service ceiling: 5,500 m (18,000 ft)

== See also ==
Aircraft of comparable role, configuration, and era

- Fairey Rotodyne
- Mil V-12

Related lists

- List of military aircraft of the Soviet Union and the CIS
