= Soloviev D-25 =

Soviet helicopter engine

D-25V
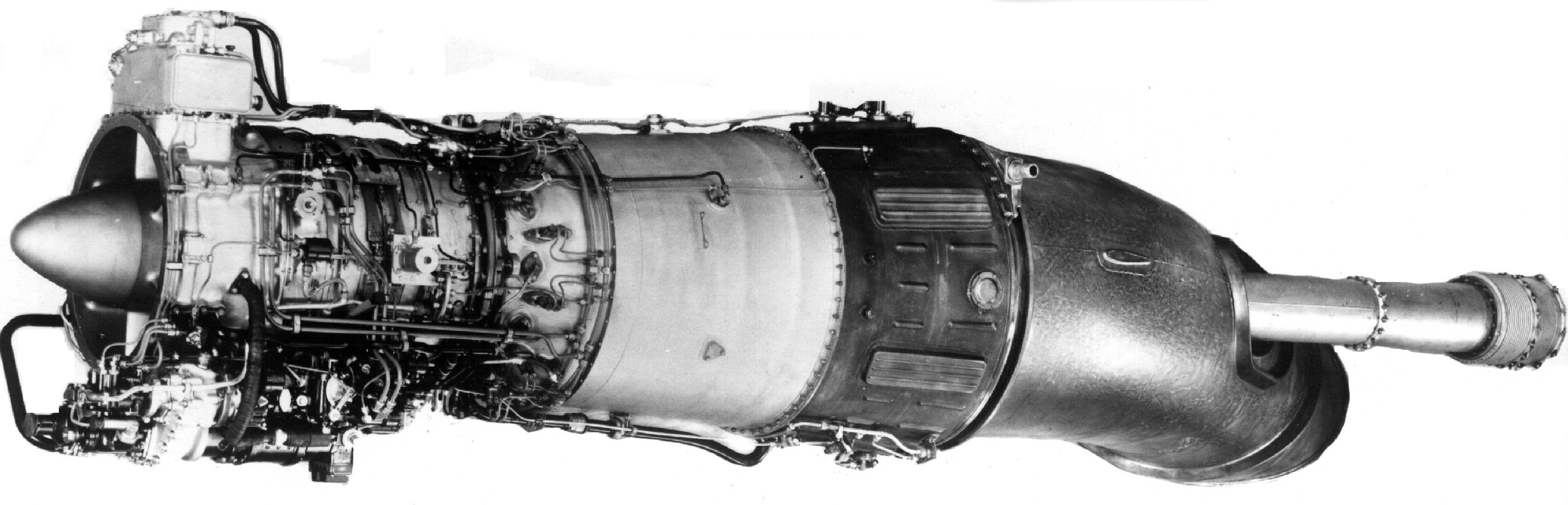
- Type: Turboshaft
- Manufacturer: Soloviev Design Bureau
- First run: 1954
- Major applications: Mil Mi-6.

The Soloviev D-25V (Russian: Д-25В) is a Soviet gas-turbine turboshaft engine for use in large helicopters. Designed and originally manufactured by the Soloviev Design Bureau the engine has been in production since May 1960. The power unit consists of two engines coupled to a gearbox weighing 3,200 kg (7,050 lb).

The V in the designation means vertolyotnyy (Russian: Вертолётный), for helicopters.

== Variants ==
D-25V
Standard helicopter use production engines
D-25VF
Additional compressor zero-stage, power output 6,500 hp (4,847 kW)
D-25VK
A combined propeller and shaft output engine for the Kamov Ka-22 developing 5,500 hp (4,101 kW)

== Applications ==
- Mi-6 helicopter
- Mi-10 helicopter
- Mi-10K "flying crane" helicopter
- Mi-12 helicopter
- Kamov Ka-22 compound helicopter
- Yakovlev Yak-60 heavy lift helicopter (concept cancelled during design stage)

== Specifications (D-25V) ==
Data from Aircraft engines of the World 1970.

==== General characteristics ====
- Type: Free-turbine single-shaft turboshaft engine
- Length: 2,737 mm (107.8 in)
- Diameter: 508 mm (20.0 in) (casing)
- Width: 1,086 mm (42.8 in)
- Height: 1,158 mm (45.6 in)
- Frontal area: 0.2 m^{2} (2.2 sq ft)
- Dry weight: 1,200 kg (2,600 lb)

==== Components ====
- Compressor: Nine-stage axial flow
- Combustors: 12-chamber cannular
- Turbine: Single-stage compressor turbine, two-stage free power turbine
- Fuel type: Aviation kerosene based fuels, such as Jet A, Jet A-1, JP-4
- Oil system: Pressure spray at 4.7 bar (68 psi) with return

==== Performance ====
- Maximum power output:

- Take-off power: 5,500 shp (4,100 kW) (equivalent) sea level to 3,000 m (9,800 ft) at 8,300 free power turbine rpm
- Cruising power: 4,700 shp (3,500 kW) (equivalent) at 3,000 m (9,800 ft) at 8,300 free power turbine rpm

- Overall pressure ratio: 5.6:1
- Air mass flow: 58 lb/s (26 kg/s) at 9,950 rpm
- Turbine inlet temperature: 1,103 K (1,526 °F; 830 °C)
- Specific fuel consumption: 0.639 lb/shp/h (0.1080 kg/kW/ks) (equivalent)
- Power-to-weight ratio: 3.42 kW/kg (2.08 shp/lb)

== See also ==
Comparable engines

- Pratt & Whitney T73

Related lists

- List of aircraft engines
