= Mil Mi-10 =

Heavy transport helicopter

Mi-10
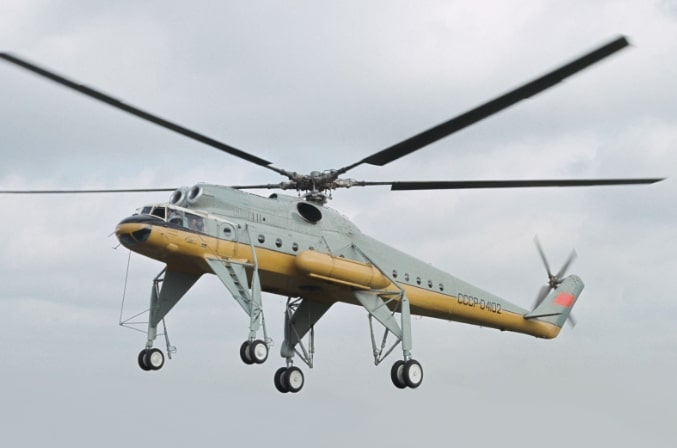
- Mil Mi-10 in flight

General information
- Type: Aerial crane
- National origin: Russia
- Manufacturer: Mil Moscow Helicopter Plant
- Status: Active as of 2014 (Mi-10K)
- Number built: 55

History
- Manufactured: 1964–69
- Introduction date: 1963
- First flight: 15 June 1960
- Developed from: Mil Mi-6

The Mil Mi-10 (NATO reporting name Harke), given the product number izdeliye 60, is a Soviet military transport helicopter of flying crane configuration, developed from the Mi-6, entering service in 1963. While most versions had been retired by 2009, the short-legged Mi-10K was still in service as of 2014.

== Design and development ==
The advent of the Mi-6 gave the Soviet Union the very useful ability to move and place large, bulky or heavy loads with precision. Limitations of the Mi-6 in the flying crane role included a weight to payload ratio and the inability of the crew to easily see the load and its intended final position. A Council of Ministers directive of 20 February 1958 tasked OKB-329 (OKB Mil) with the development of a dedicated flying crane helicopter for carrying bulky loads unable to be carried in the hold of an Mi-6.

The Mil OKB's response drew heavily on the Mi-6, utilising the dynamic components and 4,100 kW (5,500 hp) Soloviev D-25V turboshaft engines, on a slim fuselage sitting on four tall strut braced undercarriage legs, with a wide track allowing the helicopter to taxi over loads, or for mobile loads to be moved underneath. The fuselage can carry 28 passengers inside the cabin as well as 3 t (6,600 lb) of cargo loaded through a side door in the aft fuselage, by an integral boom and winch. Underslung loads can be attached directly to the fuselage by hydraulically operated clamps, or carried on a 8.5 m × 3.6 m (28 ft × 12 ft) pallet lifted by the winch and braced by cables and/or struts to the undercarriage legs. The external sling system of the Mi-6, with a capacity of 8 t (18,000 lb) could also be fitted under the centre fuselage.

The first prototype V-10 emerged with canted main undercarriage legs with single wheels on all four legs, as well as a retractable emergency escape chute extending below the cockpit and external auxiliary fuel tanks either side of the centre fuselage. As development progressed the main undercarriage legs were replaced with vertical units carrying twin wheels, twin nose undercarriage wheels after a period retaining the single wheels, an auxiliary power unit (APU) installed behind the cockpit on the starboard side and emergency escape slide cables for use when the pallet is carried.

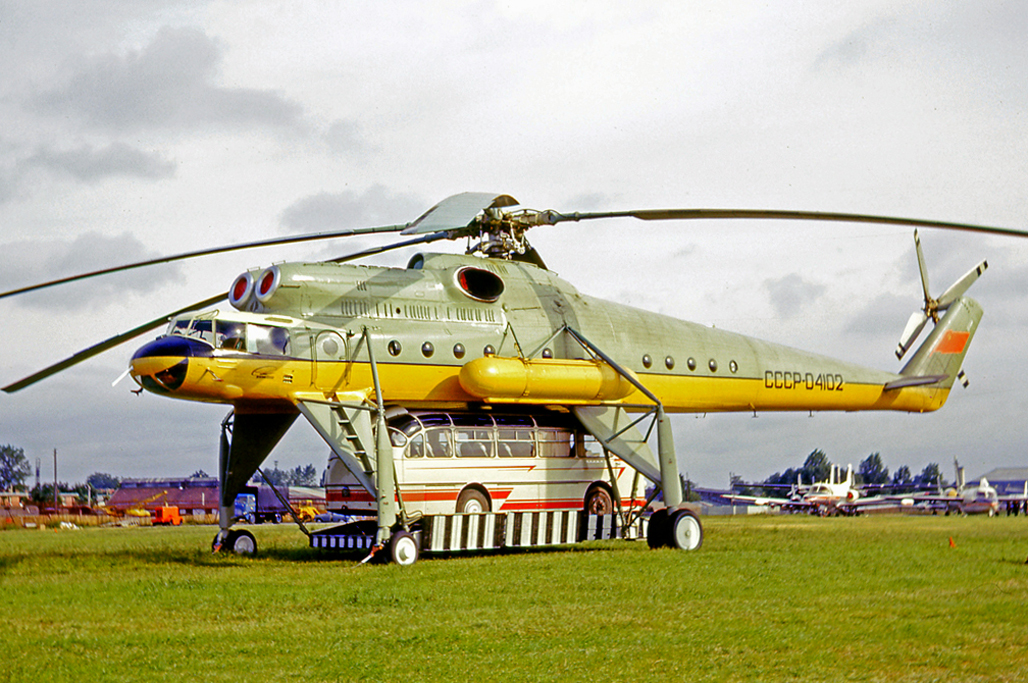
Mil Mi-10 displayed at the 1965 Paris Air Show with a LAZ bus carried beneath it.

The first prototype V-10 was completed in 1959 and was soon officially allocated the service designation Mi-10. The first flight took place on 15 June 1960 and flight testing continued successfully until in May 1960 the first prototype crashed during a precautionary landing resulting from loss of gearbox oil pressure, only the Navigator/ radio operator surviving. After joining the flight test programme the second prototype began a series of world record breaking altitude/payload flights for turbine powered helicopters. State acceptance trials were passed successfully in 1961, but production did not commence until 5 March 1964 at the Rostov-on-Don factory, with first flight of a production aircraft on 10 September 1964, leading to a total of forty of the long-legged Mi-10 helicopters built, from 1964 to 1969.

An early production Mil Mi-10 was exhibited in western Europe for the first time at the June 1965 Paris Air Show at Le Bourget Airport.

=== Mi-10K (short legged version) ===
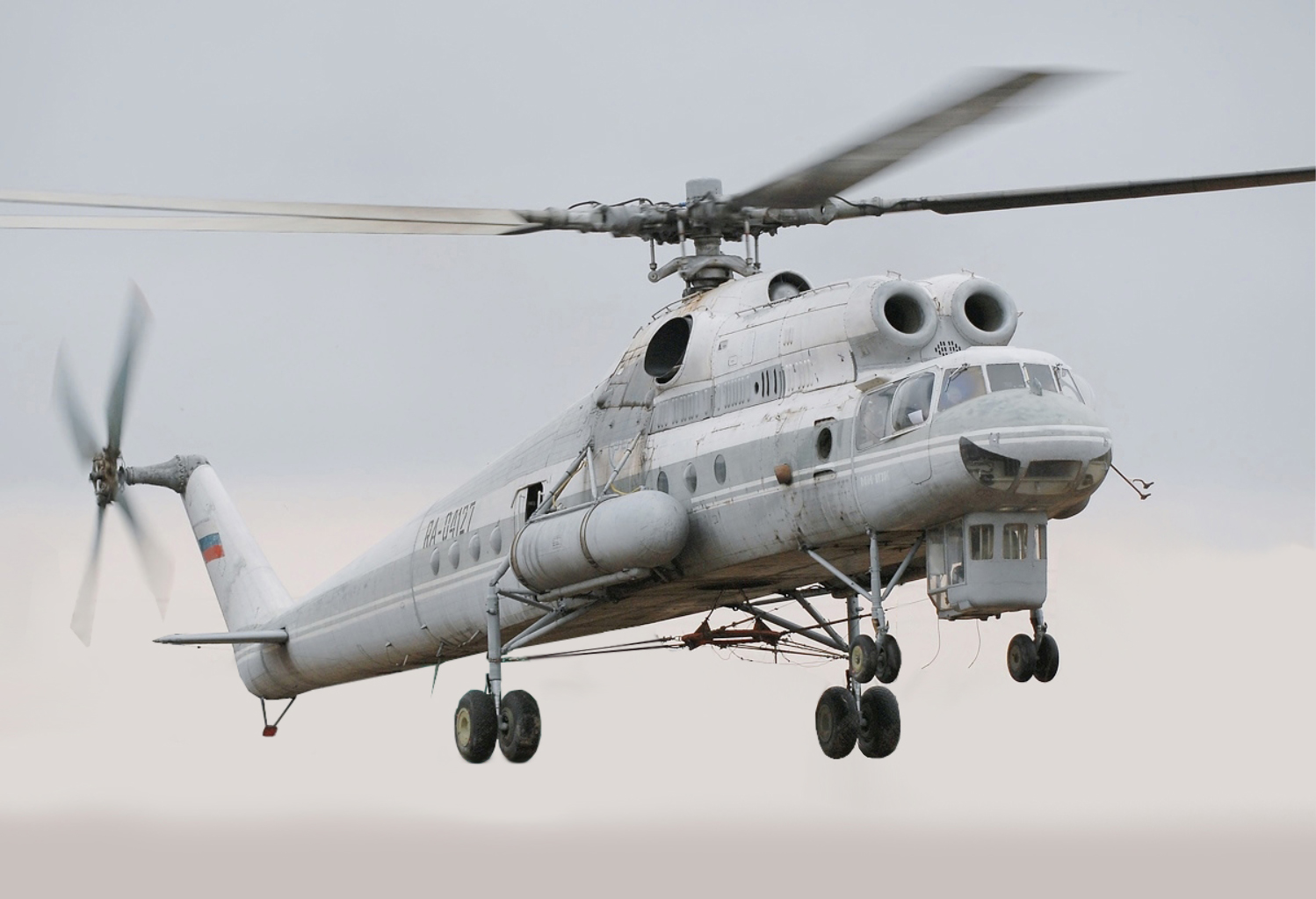
Short-legged Mi-10K

The limitations of the Mi-10 in the slung load mission soon became obvious, chiefly, the loss of payload due to the heavy and complicated undercarriage, and more importantly the almost complete lack of oversight of the slung load, despite the inclusion of a CCTV (closed circuit television) system intended for observation of slung loads.

Foregoing the requirement to carry palleted or podded cargoes, Mil redesigned the Mi-10 with a much shorter, fixed, four-leg undercarriage and replaced the extendible escape chute with a gondola fitted with flying controls for a pilot to fly the aircraft during slung load operations. The remainder of the aircraft is essentially identical with the long-legged version. Seventeen of the new flying crane were produced as the Mi-10K, including two conversions from Mi-10s from 23 March 1974 to 1977.

== Operational service ==
The operational service of the Mi-10 was of moderate success, being distributed mainly to units of the VVS (Voyenno-Vozdushnyye Sily, Soviet Air Force) which already operated the Mi-6. Operations with no load were found to be unstable, and the best procedure for take-off was found to be a rolling take-off, which usually also resulted in nose-wheel shimmy when lightly loaded. The main mission of the early Mi-10 virtually evaporated with the improvements in contemporary ballistic missiles; thus the majority of the long-legged variants were converted to Mi-10PP (or Mi-10P) airborne Electronic Counter-Measures helicopters, carrying a large ST-900 Step (Steppe) ECM pod under the fuselage mounted on a pallet.

Other Mi-10 long legged aircraft were converted to carry out a wide variety of missions but usually only as single prototypes. Of special note was the Mi-10R (R for recordnyy, record) record breaking helicopter, converted from a production machine, with the undercarriage of an Mi-6 fitted with fairings and spats, as well as a tail bumper to reduce the risk of damage to the rear fuselage on landing.

=== World records ===
The Mi-10R has held seven world records, none of which are still current, in the FAI E1 General class for rotorcraft powered by turbine engines.

Data from: Gordon, Komissarov & Komissarov 2005, p. 47

Date	Type	Record description	Achievement	Pilot
23 September 1961	Mi-10	Altitude with 15,000 kg (33,000 lb) payload	2,326 m (7,631 ft)	G.V. Alfyorov
23 September 1961	Mi-10	Maximum load to 2,000 m (6,600 ft)	15,103 kg (33,296 lb)	B.V. Zemskov
26 May 1965	Mi-10R	Altitude with 2,000 kg (4,400 lb) payload	7,151 m (23,461 ft)	V.P. Koloshenko
28 May 1965	Mi-10R	Altitude with 5,000 kg (11,000 lb) / 5,175 kg (11,409 lb) payload	7,151 m (23,461 ft)	V.P. Koloshenko
28 May 1965	Mi-10R	Altitude with 15,000 kg (33,000 lb) payload	2,840 m (9,320 ft)	G.V. Alfyorov
28 May 1965	Mi-10R	Altitude with 20,000 kg (44,000 lb) payload	2,840 m (9,320 ft)	G.V. Alfyorov
28 May 1965	Mi-10R	Altitude with 25,000 kg (55,000 lb) payload	2,840 m (9,320 ft)	G.V. Alfyorov
28 May 1965	Mi-10R	Maximum load to 2,000 m (6,600 ft)	25,105 kg (55,347 lb)	G.V. Alfyorov

== Variants ==
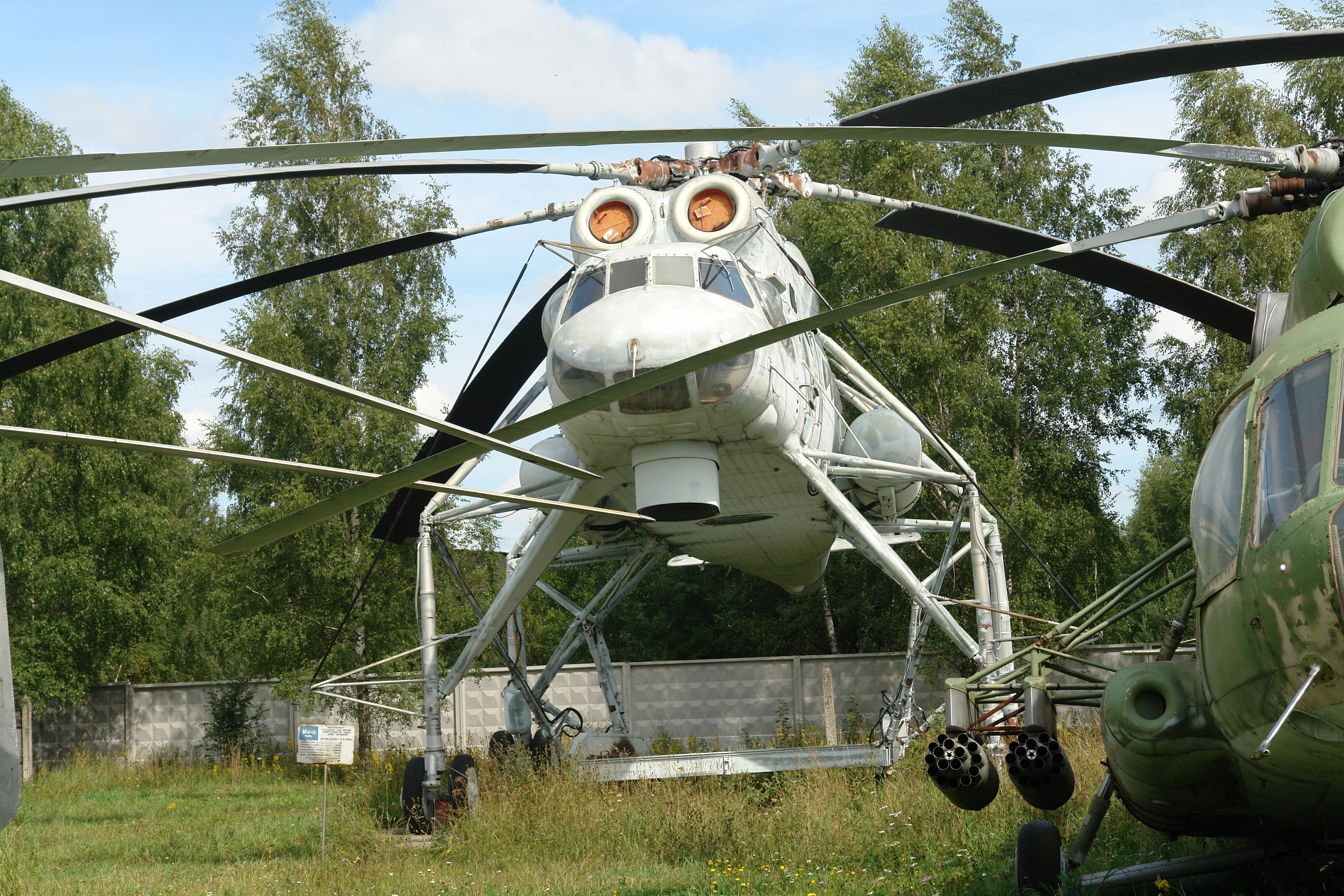
Mil Mi-10 at Monino Central Air Force Museum (Moscow)

izdeliye 60
Product / article number.
V-10
Prototypes of the Mil Mi-10 helicopter.
Mi-10
Initial standard long-legged production helicopter
Mi-10GR
A single production Mi-10 fitted with Grebeshok (Comb) direction finding equipment, for ELINT (Electronic Intelligence) duties, in a pod slung between the undercarriage legs.
Mi-10K
(K - korotkonogiy - short legged) (NATO - Harke-B) Flying crane helicopter with short-legged narrow-track undercarriage and a ventral gondola for a second pilot.
Mi-10RVK
(RVK - raketno-vertolyotnyy kompleks - heliborne missile system) Numerous variations of heliborne missile systems were envisaged, but only the 9K74 (aka S-5V) system reached the flight test stage. Missiles on launchers were carried complete with tractor units to be deployed on landing. Due to the increased take-off weight of 44.6 t (44,600 kg; 98,000 lb), the VRK was fitted with low-pressure tyres. Development was abandoned when the 4K95 cruise missile element was discontinued.
Mi-10PP
(PP - Postanovschik Pomekh jammer) ECM (Electronic Counter-Measures) helicopter, preferred military alternative designation.
Mi-10P
Company / government designation for the ECM Mi-10PP.
Mi-10R
(R - recordnyy - records) (NATO - Harke-A) A single standard production model fitted with a conventional undercarriage taken from the Mi-6 modified with spats and fairings, as well as a twin wheeled tail bumper. Some Western sources erroneously cite this aircraft as the Mi-10K.
Mi-10UPL
(universal'naya polevaya laboratoriya universal mineral laboratory) A single prototype modified to carry a detachable mobile laboratory module for ore analysis.
Mi-10 flying crane
A single prototype modified with 4,800 kW (6,500 hp) Soloviev D-25VF engines, new equipment and an up-rated transmission system.

=== Former operators ===
Russia

- UTair

Soviet Union

- Aeroflot
- Soviet Air Force

== Specifications (Mi-10) ==

Data from Taylor 1975, pp. 504–5, Gordon, Komissarov & Komissarov 2005, p. 55.

General characteristics

- Crew: 3 (pilot, copilot and flight engineer, navigator/radio operator and optional technician)
- Capacity:
  - 28 passengers or
  - 3 t (3,000 kg; 6,600 lb) internally
  - up to 15 t (15,000 kg; 33,000 lb) payload on platform or
  - 8 t (8,000 kg; 18,000 lb) max slung payload
- Length: 32.86 m (107 ft 10 in) (fuselage only), 41.89 m (137 ft 5 in) (overall length, rotors turning) (Note: According to Taylor 1975, pp. 504–5. Overall length is 41.00 m (134 ft 6 in) according to Gordon, Komissarov & Komissarov 2005, p. 55)
- Empty weight: 27,100 kg (59,745 lb) , Mi-10K 25,450 kg (56,110 lb)
- Gross weight: 43,550 kg (96,011 lb) , Mi-10K 37,000 kg (82,000 lb)
- Max takeoff weight: 43,700 kg (96,342 lb) , Mi-10K 38,000 kg (84,000 lb)
- Ground clearance under fuselage: 3.75 m (12 ft 4 in)
- Powerplant: 2 × Soloviev D-25V turboshaft, 4,100 kW (5,500 hp) each
- Main rotor diameter: 35.00 m (114 ft 10 in)
- Main rotor area: 962 m^{2} (10,350 sq ft)

Performance

- Maximum speed: 335 km/h (208 mph, 181 kn)
- Cruise speed: 180 km/h (110 mph, 97 kn)
- Range: 430 km (270 mi, 230 nmi)
- Hovering ceiling out of ground effect: 3,000 m (9,840 ft)

== See also ==
Related development

- Mil Mi-6

Aircraft of comparable role, configuration, and era

- CH-54 Tarhe / S-64 Skycrane
- CH-47 Chinook
