= Mil Mi-6 =

Transport helicopter

Mi-6
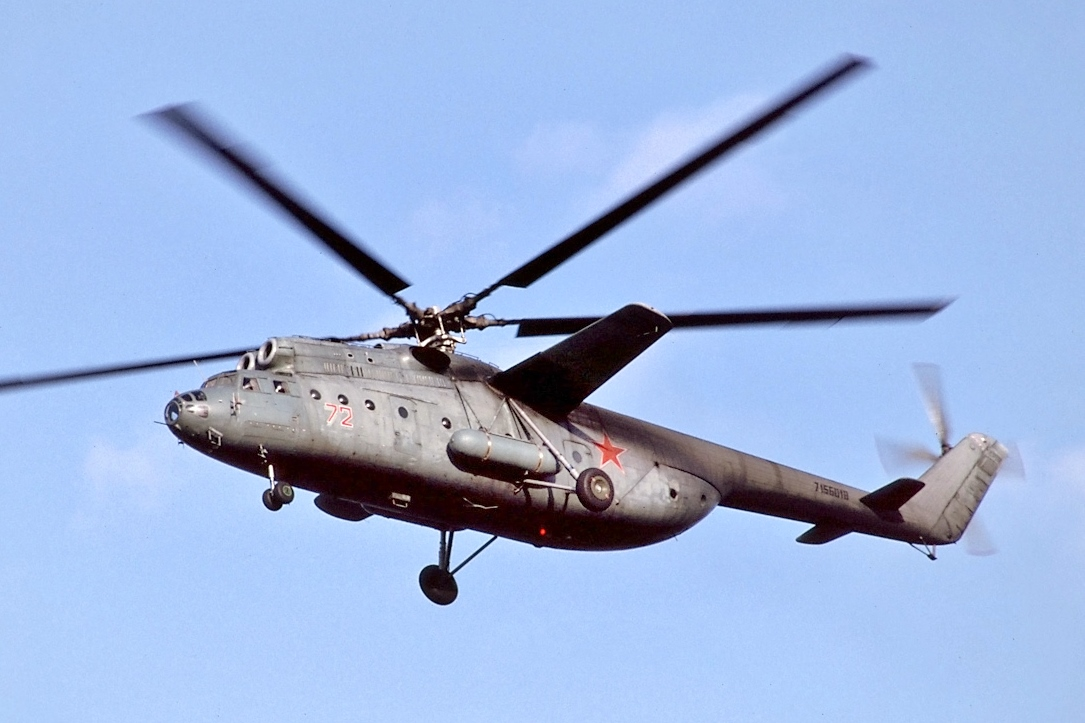
- A Mil Mi-6 of Soviet Air Forces in flight

General information
- Type: Heavy transport helicopter
- Manufacturer: Mil Moscow Helicopter Plant
- Status: Retired from service
- Primary users: Soviet Air Force (historical) Aeroflot (historical)
- Number built: 926

History
- Manufactured: 1959–1980
- First flight: 5 June 1957
- Retired: 2002 (Russia CAA)
- Variant: Mil Mi-10

The Mil Mi-6 (NATO reporting name Hook), given the article number izdeliye 50 and company designation V-6, is a Soviet/Russian heavy transport helicopter that was designed by the Mil design bureau. It was built in large numbers for both military and civil use and was the largest helicopter in production until the Mil Mi-26 was put in production in 1980.

== Design and development ==
The Mi-6 resulted from a joint civil-military requirement for a very large vertical-lift aircraft, which could be used to add mobility in military operations as well as assist in the exploration and development of the expansive central and eastern regions of the USSR. Flown for the first time on 5 June 1957, the Mi-6 was the first Soviet turboshaft-powered production helicopter.

The R-7 gearbox and rotor head developed for the project have a combined weight of 3200 kg, which is greater than the two turboshaft engines.

Variable-incidence winglets were first mounted on the craft's sides in 1960 to the 30 pre-series units. These wings provide approximately 20% of the lift required during cruise flight.

The Mi-6 was by far the world's largest helicopter when it was designed in 1954–56; with a maximum load capacity of 12,000 kg. It was also the world's fastest helicopter; with a top speed of 300 km/h (190 mph). In its early days, the Mi-6 set many world records, including one for sheer circuit speed at 340 km/h (211 mph). As of 2013, the Mi-6 still holds the FAI record of fastest 5-tonne lift over 1,000 km, in which it flew 284 km/h in 1962.

From 1959 to 1972 at least 500 units were built for various general-transport, utility, firefighting and flying-crane duties, the last two sub-types not being fitted with the large fixed wings, which in other versions bear part of the lift in cruising flight and thus enable higher speeds to be attained. The twin nose wheels and large low-pressure main wheels do not retract.

Normally flown by a crew of five or more, the Mi-6 seats 65 armed troops and can alternatively carry 41 stretcher (litter) patients and two attendants, or a wide range of bulky loads, including vehicles, loaded through rear clamshell doors. In exercises, fleets of these aircraft have airlifted many kinds of weapons, including FROG-7 rockets on their PT-76 tracked chassis, as well as large radars and heavy artillery. All Soviet armoured personnel carriers, armoured cars and light mechanised infantry combat vehicles can be carried.

The Mi-6 was finally retired in October 2002, after its type certificate was withdrawn by the Interstate Aviation Committee after the crash of RA-21074 in the Taimyr Peninsula. There have also been reports that the wooden tail rotor blades have reached the end of their service life.

== Variants ==
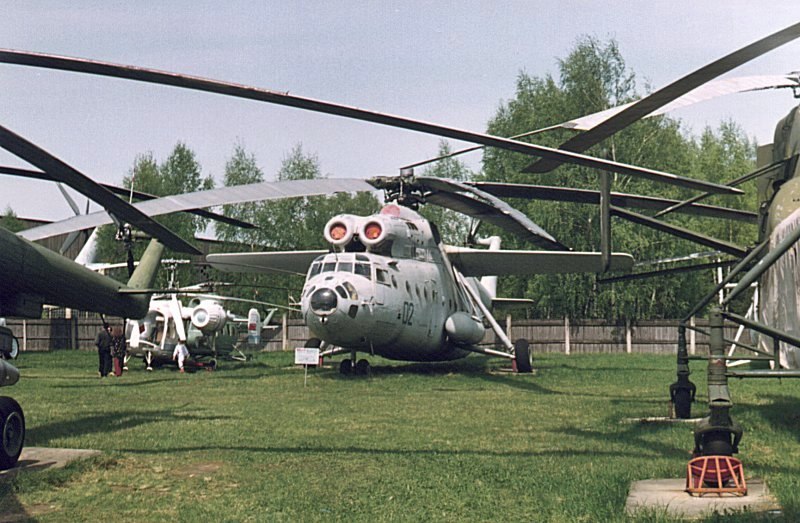
A Mil Mi-6.

Data from: Mil's heavylift helicopters : Mi-6, Mi-10, V-12 and Mi-26

izdeliye 50
The product or article number for the V-6 prototype.
V-6
(Zavod No.329 Moscow) First prototype series.
Mi-6
(NATO – Hook-A) Heavy-lift civil and military transport helicopter.
Mi-6A
Troopships and commercial transport helicopters built to a new baseline standard with improvements in reliability and new avionics.
Mi-6AYa
(NATO – Hook-D) OKB designation for the Mi-6VzPU and Mi-22 airborne command posts, with SLAR.
Mi-6APS
(PS – poiskovo-spasahtel'nyy – search and rescue) A limited number of search and rescue helicopters converted from Mi-6A standard aircraft.
Mi-6ATZ
(TZ – toplivo-zapravshchik – fuel tanker) Fuel transport helicopter variant of the Mi-6A.
Mi-6 Boorlak
(boorlak – barge hauler) Prototype ASW/MCM helicopters, used for research into ASW equipment when delays to the mission equipment forced cancellation.
Mi-6BUS
(NATO – Hook-C) (Also Mi-6AYa and Mi-22) airborne command post helicopter of 1975.
Mi-6L
(Also Mi-6LL: Letayushchaya laboratoriya) Flying laboratory variant with D-25VF engines used for flight improvements of the Mi-6 and testbed for the powerplant of the Mi-12.
Mi-6M
(M – morskoy – maritime) Anti-submarine variant armed with four aerial torpedoes and ASW rockets, and equipped with various experimental ASW systems. First built in 1963 and modified in 1965 for the "Barge Hauler" program.
Mi-6M
(M – modifitseerovannyy – modified) A projected redesign of the Mi-6 to carry 11 to 22 t (11,000 to 22,000 kg; 24,000 to 49,000 lb) over 800 km (500 mi), cancelled due to the limitations of the five-bladed rotor specified.
Mi-6P
(P – passazheerskiy – passenger) Passenger transport helicopter, with accommodation for 80 passengers. One prototype was converted from a stock Mi-6.
Mi-6PP
(PP – postanovshchik pomekh – ECM aircraft) A prototype Counter-ELINT aircraft to protect air-defense radars from enemy ECM and/or ELINT activities .
Mi-6PR
(Protivodeystviya Radiorazvedke) Development in 1962 for jammer/electronic warfare variant.
Mi-6PRTBV
(podvizhnaya raketno-tekhnicheskaya baza vertlyotnovo tipa) A few modified as mobile missile maintenance technical bases and missile transporters.
Mi-6PS
(PS – poiskovo-spasahtel'nyy – search and rescue) Search and rescue (SAR) helicopter developed in 1966 for pick-up of the landed Vostok and Soyuz space modules.
Mi-6PSA
Alternative designation, used in some sources, for the Mi-6APS.
Mi-6PZh
(PZh – pozharnyy – fire fighting) Fire fighting variant, with a 12,000 L (2,639.63 imp gal; 3,170.06 US gal) tank in the cabin and six 1,500 L (329.95 imp gal; 396.26 US gal) bags suspended from the fuselage. The sole prototype crashed in France fighting a fire, soon after display at the 27th Paris Air Show.

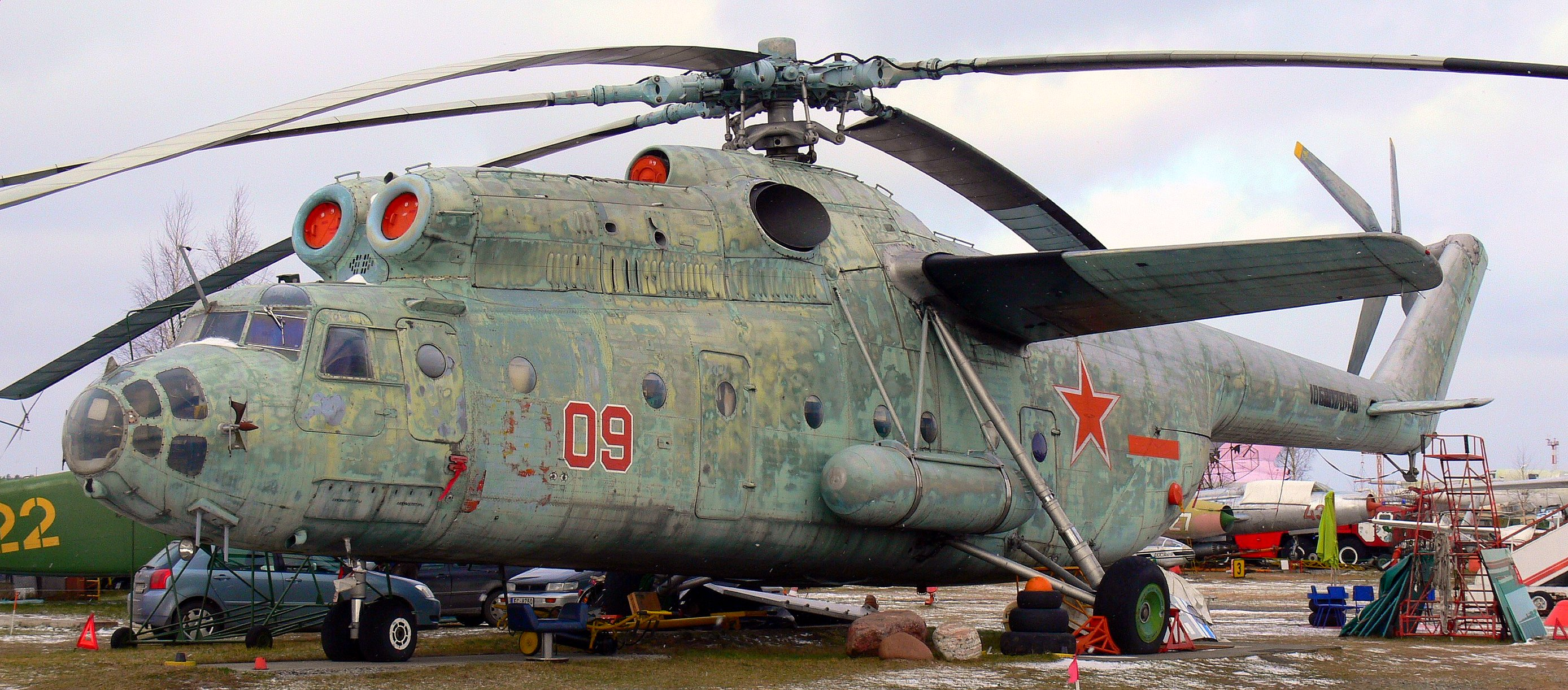
An Mi-6 at Riga, Latvia

Mi-6PZh2
A second firefighting helicopter prototype and several conversions with a steerable water cannon in the nose.
Mi-6R
(R – Retranslyator – ) Specialised radio communications relay variant developed in 1974, prototype conversions only.
Mi-6RVK
(RVK – raketno-vertolyotny kompleks – heliborne missile system) Tested in 1965 loaded with 9K53, 9K73, 9M21 Luna-MV or 8K114 mobile missile systems.
Mi-6S
Medical evacuation helicopter, which can carry 41 litters.
Mi-6T
(NATO – Hook-A) Military transport helicopter, which can seat up to 70 people on tip-up seats along the cabin sides, with additional seat along the center-line.
Mi-6TP
Convertible freight/passenger helicopter.
Mi-6TZ
(TZ – toplivo-zapravshchik – fuel tanker) Fuel transport helicopter to refuel vehicles and helicopters on the ground.
Mi-6TZ-SV
(TZ-SV – toplivo-zapravshchik – sookhoputnyye voyska – fuel tanker-ground forces) Fuel transport helicopter to refuel vehicles on the ground.
Mi-6VR
(VR - Vodoley – Aquarius) A water spraying research helicopter to test helicopter anti-icing systems.
Mi-6VKP
(NATO – Hook-B) (VKP – vozdooshnnyy poonkt – airborne command post) Command post transport helicopter to deploy comms and war room on the ground, not usable in flight.
Mi-6VUS
(NATO – Hook-D) airborne command post with SLAR.
Mi-6VzPU
(NATO – Hook-D) Service designation of the Mi-6AYa airborne command post with SLAR, entered service as the Mi-22.
Mi-6?
Developed in 1962 with collapsible BU-75BRM drilling rig for oil exploration in Siberia. Exact designation unknown.
Mi-6?
Missile fuel transport to supplement the Mi-6PRTBV
Mi-6?
An experimental conversion in 1976 for testing the rotor system of the Mi-26.
Mi-22
VVS designation of the Mi-6AYa/VzPU airborne command post helicopters.

== Operators ==
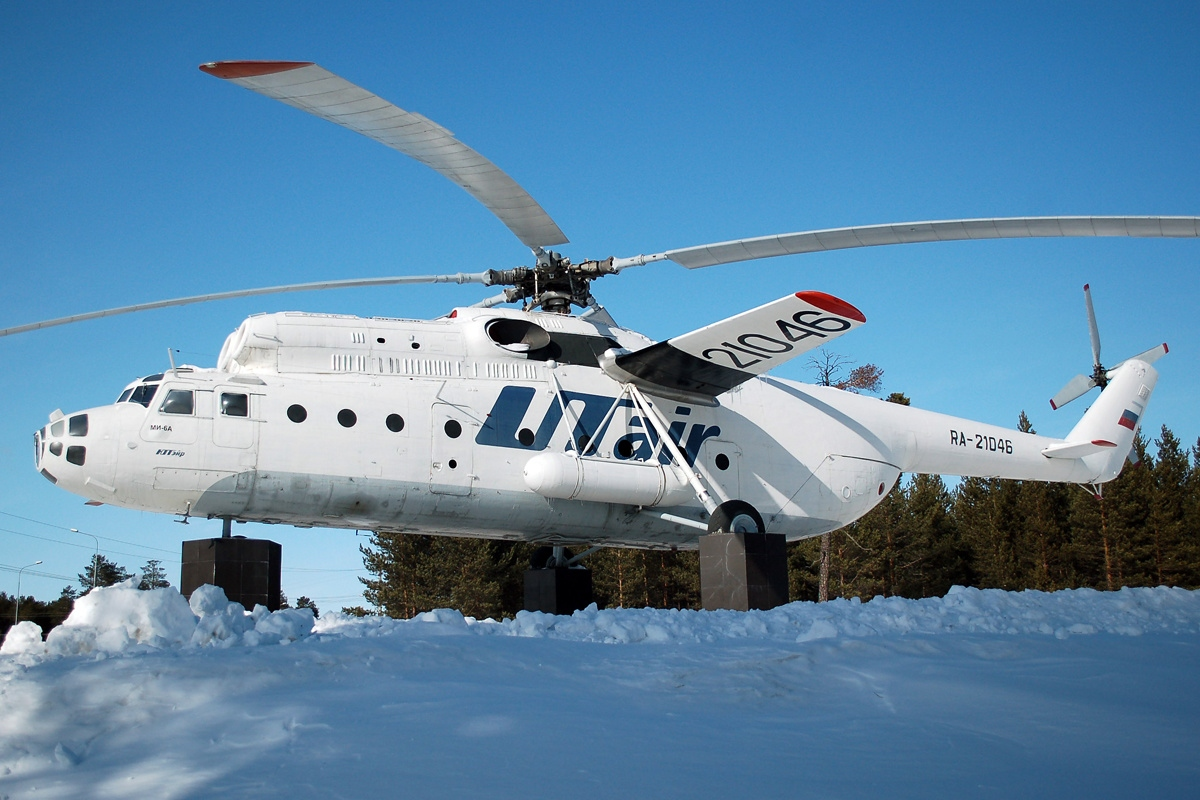
An Mi-6 with UTair Aviation

=== Former military operators ===
Democratic Republic of Afghanistan

- Afghan Air Force
- Afghan Army

Algeria

- Algerian Air Force

Belarus

- Belarus Air Force

China

- People's Liberation Army

Egypt

- Egyptian Air Force

Ethiopia

- Ethiopian Air Force

Indonesia

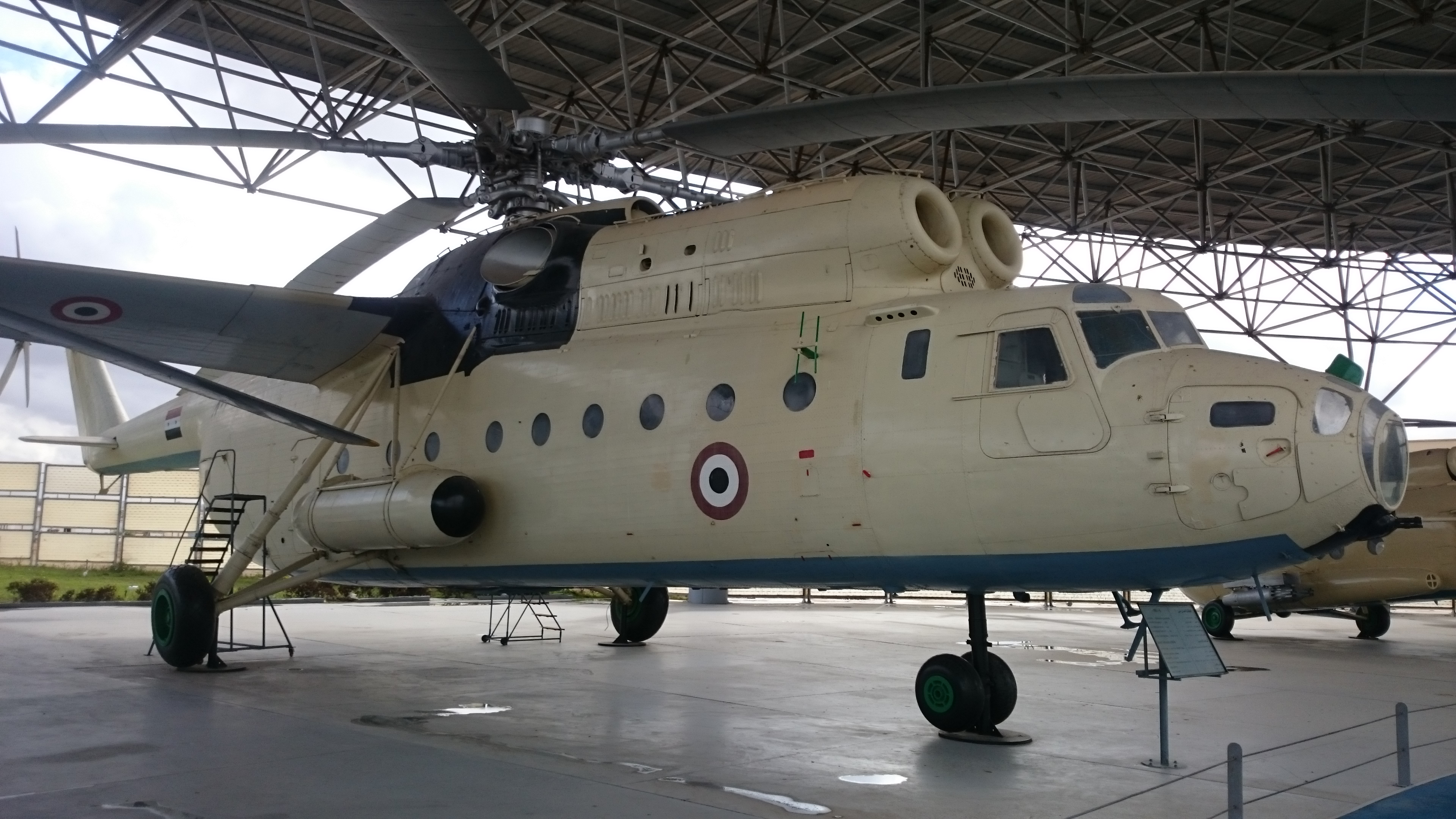
Egyptian Air Force Mil Mi-6 on display at the Air Force museum in Almaza Air Base, Cairo.

- Indonesian Air Force

Iraq

- Iraqi Air Force

Kazakhstan

- Kazakh Air Force

Laos

- Laotian Air Force

Pakistan

- Pakistan Army (Note: The sole Mi-6 acquired by Pakistan for trial basis was for the Pakistan Army Aviation but flown by Pakistan Air Force pilots till its fatal crash in 1968 near Gilgit Source:)

Peru

- Peruvian Air Force
- Peruvian Army

Polish People's Republic

- Polish Air Force

Russia

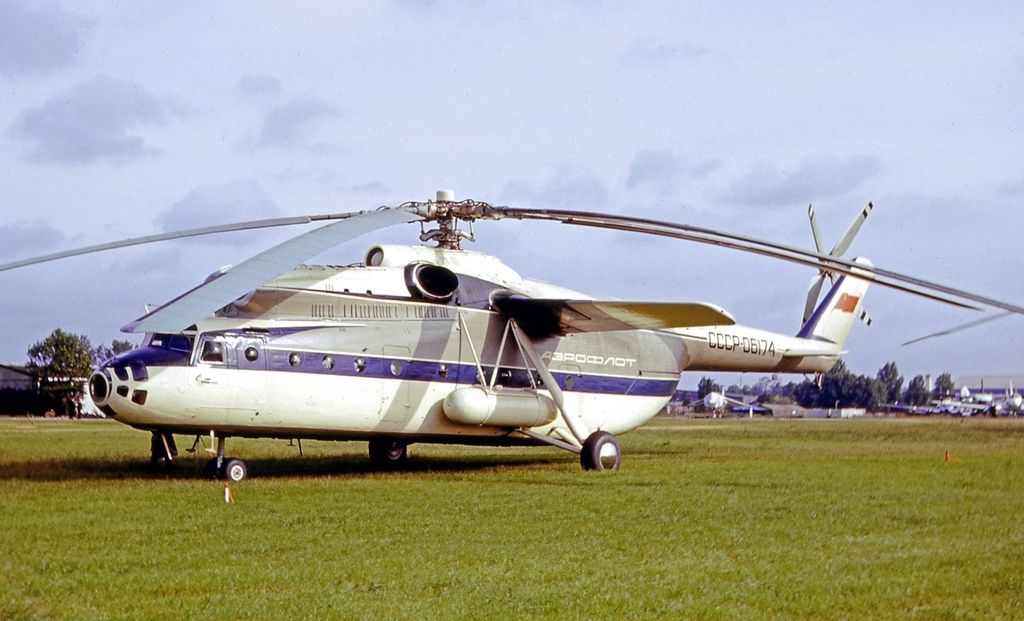
A Mil Mi-6 of Aeroflot at the 1965 Paris Air Show

- Russian Air Force

Ukraine

- Ukrainian Air Force

Soviet Union

- Aeroflot
- Soviet Air Force

Vietnam

- Vietnamese Air Force

== Specifications (Mi-6) ==
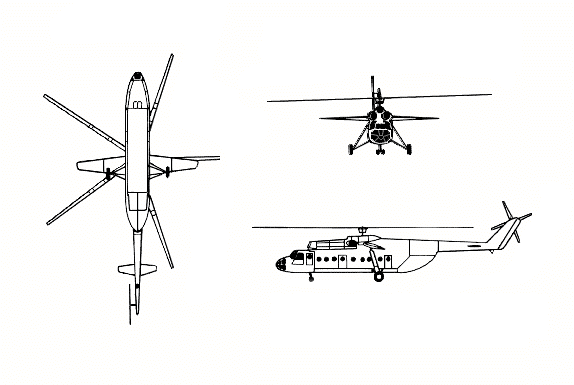

Data from Jane's All The World's Aircraft 1992–93, Mil's heavylift helicopters : Mi-6, Mi-10, V-12 and Mi-26

General characteristics

- Crew: 6 (pilot, copilot, navigator, flight engineer, radio operator, technician)
- Capacity: 90 passengers / 70 airborne troops / 41 stretcher cases with 2 medical personnel
- Payload: 12,000 kg (26,455 lb) maximum internal cargo

9,016 kg (19,877 lb) at 44,000 kg (97,003 lb) TOW
7,516 kg (16,570 lb) at 42,500 kg (93,696 lb) TOW
5,516 kg (12,161 lb) at 40,500 kg (89,287 lb) TOW

- Maximum slung load: 8,000 kg (17,637 lb)
- Height: 9.156 m (30 ft 0 in)
- Wing area: 35 m^{2} (380 sq ft) auxiliary wing (when fitted)
- Airfoil: root:TsAGI P-35 (15%); tip:TsAGI P-35 (12%)

Port wing 14° 15' incidence; Starboard wing 15° 45' incidence

- Gross weight: 40,500 kg (89,287 lb)
- Max takeoff weight: 44,000 kg (97,003 lb)
- Fuel capacity: 8,250 L (2,180 US gal; 1,810 imp gal) (6,315 kg (13,922 lb)) in 11 fuselage tanks + 4,500 L (1,200 US gal; 990 imp gal) in two external tanks + optional 4,500 L (1,200 US gal; 990 imp gal) in auxiliary cabin tanks
- Maximum fuel capacity: 17,250 L (4,560 US gal; 3,790 imp gal)
- Powerplant: 2 × Soloviev D-25V turboshaft engines, 4,100 kW (5,500 shp) each equivalent for take-off

2,312 kW (3,100 shp) at 3,100 m (10,200 ft) and 250 km/h (160 mph; 130 kn)

- Main rotor diameter: 35 m (114 ft 10 in)
- Main rotor area: 962.1 m^{2} (10,356 sq ft)
- Blade section: root: NACA 23011 mod; tip: TsAGI

Performance

- Maximum speed: 300 km/h (190 mph, 160 kn)
- Cruise speed: 250 km/h (160 mph, 130 kn)
- Range: 970 km (600 mi, 520 nmi) at 1,000 m (3,300 ft) at 40,500 kg (89,287 lb) TOW
- Ferry range: 1,450 km (900 mi, 780 nmi)
- Endurance: 2 hours 51 minutes at 140–160 km/h (87–99 mph; 76–86 kn) at 1,000 m (3,300 ft) and 40,500 kg (89,287 lb) TOW
- Service ceiling: 4,500 m (14,800 ft) up to 42,500 kg (93,696 lb) TOW

3,000 m (9,800 ft) at more than 42,500 kg (93,696 lb) TOW

- Time to altitude: at 40,500 kg (89,287 lb) TOW

3,000 m (9,800 ft) in 9 minutes 42 seconds
4,500 m (14,800 ft) in 20 minutes 42 seconds

- Wing loading: 32.15 kg/m^{2} (6.58 lb/sq ft) at 40,500 kg (89,287 lb) at cruise speeds
- Disk loading: 44.17 kg/m^{2} (9.05 lb/sq ft)
- Power/mass: 0.21 kW/kg (0.13 hp/lb)

Armament
The navigator's station can be equipped with a 12.7 mm (0.500 in) Afanasev A-12.7 machine-gun with up to 270 rounds

== See also ==
Related development

- Mi-10
- V-12
- Mi-26

Aircraft of comparable role, configuration, and era

- CH-54 Tarhe / S-64 Skycrane
- CH-53 Super Stallion
- CH-47 Chinook
- Aérospatiale Super Frelon
- Kamov Ka-22

== Bibliography ==
- Gordon, Yefim; Komissarov, Dimitriy; Komissarov, Sergey (2005). Mil's heavylift helicopters : Mi-6, Mi-10, V-12 and Mi-26. Red Star. Vol. 22 (2nd ed.). Hinckley: Midland Publishing. ISBN 1-85780-206-3.
- Mondey, David (1982). Encyclopedia of the World's Commercial and Private Aircraft. New York City: Crescent Books. p. 201.
- "Pentagon Over the Islands: The Thirty-Year History of Indonesian Military Aviation". Air Enthusiast Quarterly (2): 154–162. n.d. ISSN 0143-5450.
