= RBM10 =

Protein-coding gene in the species Homo sapiens

Identifiers
- Aliases: RBM10, DXS8237E, GPATC9, GPATCH9, S1-1, TARPS, ZRANB5, RNA binding motif protein 10
- External IDs: OMIM: 300080; MGI: 2384310; GeneCards: RBM10
Available structures
PDB	Ortholog search: PDBe RCSB
PDB	List of PDB id codes 2LXI, 2M2B, 2MXV, 2MXW

Gene location (Human)
Chr.	X chromosome (human)
Band	Xp11.3	Start	47,145,221 bp
Band	Xp11.3	End	47,186,813 bp

Gene location (Mouse)
Chr.	X chromosome (mouse)
Band	X|X A1.3	Start	20,483,742 bp
Band	X|X A1.3	End	20,517,140 bp
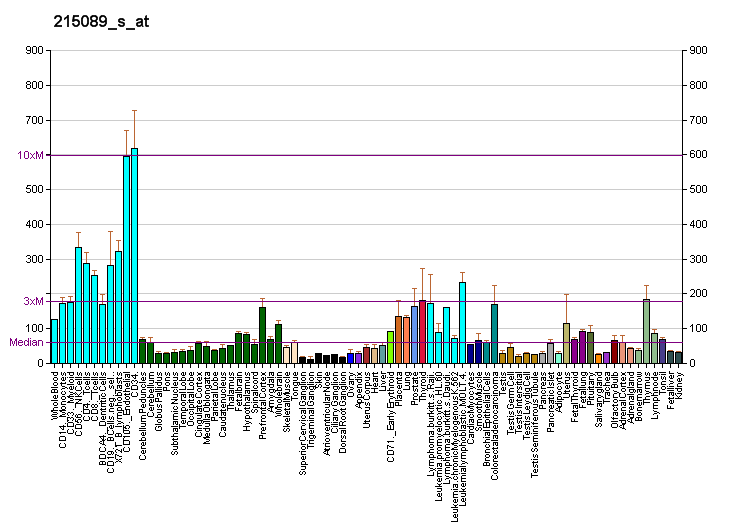

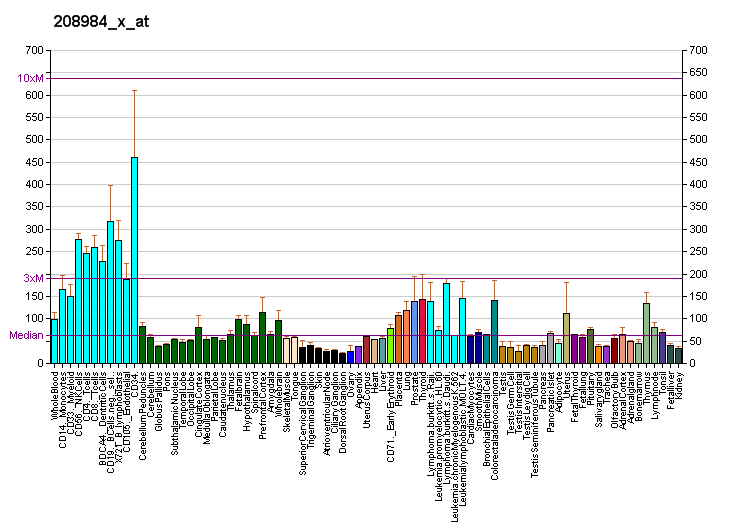

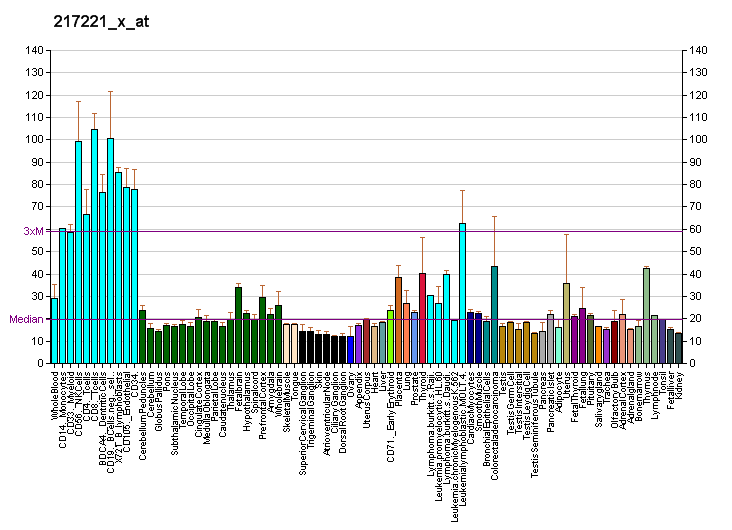
RNA expression pattern
Bgee	Human / Mouse (ortholog); Top expressed in: right hemisphere of cerebellum; ventricular zone; ganglionic eminence; granulocyte; left ovary; tendon of biceps brachii; right ovary; pituitary gland; anterior pituitary; mucosa of transverse colon / Top expressed in: Rostral migratory stream; endocardial cushion; renal corpuscle; medullary collecting duct; ureter; Paneth cell; primitive streak; trigeminal ganglion; fossa; condyle; More reference expression data
BioGPS	More reference expression data
Gene ontology
Molecular function	protein-containing complex binding; protein binding; metal ion binding; identical protein binding; nucleic acid binding; RNA binding; miRNA binding
Cellular component	nucleus; nuclear speck; protein-containing complex
Biological process	regulation of apoptotic process; mRNA processing; regulation of alternative mRNA splicing, via spliceosome; RNA splicing; negative regulation of transcription by RNA polymerase II; biological process; negative regulation of cell population proliferation; regulation of smooth muscle cell apoptotic process; positive regulation of smooth muscle cell apoptotic process; negative regulation of mRNA splicing, via spliceosome; 3'-UTR-mediated mRNA stabilization
Sources:Amigo / QuickGO
Orthologs
Databases	NCBI: entry; OMA: entry
Species	Human	Mouse
Entrez	8241	236732
Ensembl	ENSG00000182872	ENSMUSG00000031060
UniProt	P98175; Q7Z3D7	Q99KG3
RefSeq (mRNA)	NM_001204466; NM_001204467; NM_001204468; NM_005676; NM_152856	NM_001167775; NM_001167776; NM_145627; NM_001358903; NM_001358904 NM_001358905
RefSeq (protein)	NP_001191395; NP_001191396; NP_001191397; NP_005667; NP_690595 NP_001191397.1	NP_001161247; NP_001161248; NP_663602; NP_001345832; NP_001345833 NP_001345834
Location (UCSC)	Chr X: 47.15 – 47.19 Mb	Chr X: 20.48 – 20.52 Mb
PubMed search
- Wikidata
View/Edit Human	View/Edit Mouse

RNA-binding motif 10 is a protein that is encoded by the RBM10 gene. This gene maps on the X chromosome at Xp11.23 in humans. RBM10 is a regulator of alternative splicing. Alternative splicing is a process associated with gene expression to produce multiple protein isoforms from a single gene, thereby creating functional diversity and cellular complexity. RBM10 influences the expression of many genes, participating in various cellular processes and pathways such as cell proliferation and apoptosis. Its mutations are associated with various human diseases such as TARP syndrome, an X-linked congenital disorder in males resulting in pre‐ or postnatal lethality, and various cancers in adults.

== Gene and protein ==
The RBM10 gene spans ~41.6 kb and contains 24 exons. This gene is subjected to X-inactivation, in which one of the two RBM10 genes in female cells is transcriptionally silenced by heterochromatin formation.

RBM proteins constitute a large family of RNA-binding proteins (RBPs). There are 52 RBM proteins (HGNC: HUGO Gene Nomenclature Committee), each containing one to several RNA-binding domains called RNA recognition motifs (RRMs). RBM10 contains two RRMs (RRM1 and RRM2) and other domains such as two zinc fingers (ZnFs), an octamer repeat (OCRE), three nuclear localization signals (NLSs), and a glycine-rich domain (G-patch). The amino acid (aa) sequence of RBM10 is conserved among mammals. Human RBM10 isoform 1 shares 96% and 97% sequence homology with those of mice and rats, respectively, indicating that the molecular functions of RBM10 are essentially the same in humans and rodents.

RBM10 has multiple isoforms, generated via alternative splicing events of the RBM10 primary transcript. The main isoforms, 1–4, may contain an exon 4 sequence (77 residues) and/or a Val residue corresponding to the last codon of exon 10. Isoform 1 (930 residues) contains both the exon 4 sequence and V354, whereas isoform 4 (929 residues) does not contain this valine residue. Similarly, the exon 4–minus isoform 3 (853 residues) contains V277, whereas isoform 2 (852 residues) does not. Isoform 5 (995 residues) has a longer 65-aa N-terminus, compared with that of isoform 1. In addition, automated computational analysis using the Gnomon gene prediction tool (NCBI gene) has shown that there may be more than 10 different RBM isoforms.

== Function ==
RBM10 is ubiquitously expressed in almost every type of cell, both growing as well as quiescent (UniProtKB-P98175 [human] and Q99KG3 [mouse]; The Human Protein Atlas). In general, it is more strongly expressed in actively transcribing cells.

In the alternative splicing regulation, RBM10 promotes the exclusion of an exon, called a cassette or alternative exon, from target pre-mRNAs, and less frequently, other alternative splicing events such as alternative 5ʹ-splice site selection. In the exon skipping process, RBM10 binds close to the 3ʹ- and 5ʹ-splice sites of cassette exons and interferes with the recognition and/or the pairing of the splice sites, thereby enhancing the pairing of the splice sites distal to the cassette exons, which ultimately leads to the exclusion of the exons together with the flanking upstream and downstream introns.

The diversity of target RNAs bound by RBM10 in cells suggests that it is involved in various metabolic processes such as oxidative phosphorylation; pathways linked to cell proliferation, apoptosis, cell adhesion, and actin/cytoskeleton reorganization; and various diseases such as cancers and neurodegenerative diseases. These data, together with the ubiquitous expression of RBM10, indicate that it is a fundamental cellular component participating in various cellular processes. In addition to alternative splicing regulation, RBM10 participates in other reactions. Some examples are polyadenylation of cardiac pre-mRNAs of anti-hypertrophy regulators, wherein it acts as a co-regulator of STAR-poly(A) polymerase, stabilization of angiotensin II receptor mRNA by binding to its 3ʹ-UTR, let-7g miRNA biogenesis through interaction with its precursor, p53 stabilization by binding to its negative regulator, MDM2, cell cycle arrest, and anti-viral reactions.

RBM10 localizes to the nucleoplasm, where transcription and splicing occur, as well as in membrane-less nuclear compartments called S1-1 nuclear bodies (S1-1 NBs). The numbers (ca. 10–40 per nucleus) and sizes (ca. 0.5 μm) of S1-1 NBs vary with the cell type and cellular conditions. When RNA polymerase II transcription decreases, RBM10 in the nucleoplasm is sequestered in S1-1 NBs, which become larger and spherical; when transcription is restored, RBM10 and the S1-1 NBs return to their initial states. S1-1 NBs often overlap with nuclear speckles (also known as splicing speckles or interchromatin granule clusters), seemingly indicating a close functional relationship between these nuclear domains, i.e., alternative splicing regulation and splicing reaction.

== Regulation ==
In females, most genes on one of the two X chromosomes are transcriptionally silenced by heterochromatin formation, and RBM10 is subjected to this X-inactivation. In addition, there are mechanisms to control elevated cellular levels of RBM10. RBM10 auto-regulates its overexpressed pre-mRNA by alternative splicing to exclude exon 6 or 12, which generates a premature stop codon in the transcripts, leading to their degradation through nonsense-mediated mRNA decay (NMD). When RNA polymerase II transcription decreases, RBM10 is sequestered in S1-1 NBs until transcription is restored. In addition, RBM10 undergoes post-translational modifications: phosphorylation at many sites in response to various stimuli and changes in cellular conditions (UniProtKB-P98175; PhosphoSitePlus RBM10), as well as ubiquitylation, acetylation, and methylation. However, the molecular and biological significance of these various post-translational modifications of RBM10 is not well understood.

== Clinical significance ==
Mutations in RBM10 are associated with various human diseases. The phenotypes caused by RBM10 mutations differ by the stages of development and affected tissues. Typical examples are TARP syndrome, an X-linked pleiotropic developmental malformation in neonates, and various cancers such as lung adenocarcinoma (LUAD) and bladder carcinoma (BLCA) in adults. These diseases are more common in males than in females. One reason for this is the difference in the copy number of the RBM10 gene in a cell (one in male cells and two in female cells). Mutations in RBM10 occur throughout the molecule, and many of them are null mutations. TARP syndrome is generally pre- or postnatally lethal. However, patients aged 11, 14, and 28 years have been reported to escape these null mutations. RBM10 mutations have also been identified in other cancers such as renal carcinomas, pancreatic cancers, colorectal cancers, thyroid cancers, breast cancers, bile duct cancers, prostate cancer, and brain tumor meningiomas and astroblastomas.

NUMB is the most studied downstream effector of RBM10. RBM10 promotes the skipping of exon 9 of the NUMB transcript, producing a NUMB isoform that causes ubiquitination followed by proteasomal degradation of the Notch receptor, and thereby inhibits the Notch signaling cell-proliferation pathway. In various cancers, RBM10 mutations that inactivate or reduce its alternative splicing regulatory activity enhance the production of the exon 9–including NUMB isoform, which promotes cancer cell proliferation through the Notch pathway.

RBM10 suppresses cell proliferation and promotes apoptosis. Hence, it is generally regarded as a tumor suppressor. However, in certain cases, it may exert an opposite oncogenic function by acting as a tumor promoter or growth enhancer, presumably due to the cellular contexts composed of different constituents and active pathways. A typical example of this is patients with pancreatic ductal adenocarcinoma (PDAC) having RBM10 mutations, who exhibit a survival rate remarkably higher than the general 5-year PDAC survival rate of less than 7–8%.

== Paralogs and splicing network ==
RBM5 and RBM6 are paralogs of RBM10. They were generated by gene duplications during genome evolution. They generally function as tumor suppressors, and their mutations are often identified in lung cancers. RBM5, RBM6, and RBM10 regulate alternative splicing and generally act on different RNAs; however, in certain cases, they act on the same subset of RNAs, likely producing synergistic or antagonistic effects. There is a cross-regulation between RBM5 and RBM10; RBM10 lowers RBM5 transcript levels by alternative splicing–coupled NMD. Furthermore, RBM10 perturbation (knockdown or overexpression) brings about splicing alterations in multiple splicing regulators, including RBM5, and also significantly influences the expression of other splicing regulators, including RBM10 itself. In addition, RBM10 primary transcripts are subjected to alternative splicing at several exons by unidentified splicing regulators, leading to the generation of multiple RBM10 isoforms. These data suggest the existence of an alternative splicing network formed by RBM5, RBM6, and RBM10, as well as other splicing regulators. Studies on such networks are expected to promote our understanding of transcriptomic homeostasis regulated by splicing and the molecular and biological significance of RBM10 in cells.

RBM10 regulates hundreds of genes. Further studies on the various RBM10-mediated processes and pathways may help elucidate the pathogenesis and progression of diseases caused by RBM10 mutations and the mechanisms of the antithetical actions of RBM10 as a tumor suppressor, and in certain cases, a tumor promoter, and provide clues for better treatment of the diseases.
