= H37 =

H37 may refer to:

- H-37 (Michigan county highway)
- HMS Garland (H37), a Royal Navy G-class destroyer
- London Buses route H37, a Transport for London contracted bus route
- RBM5, a gene
- Sikorsky CH-37 Mojave, an American helicopter
