= Convair NC-131H Samaritan =

In-flight simulator aircraft

NC-131H Samaritan
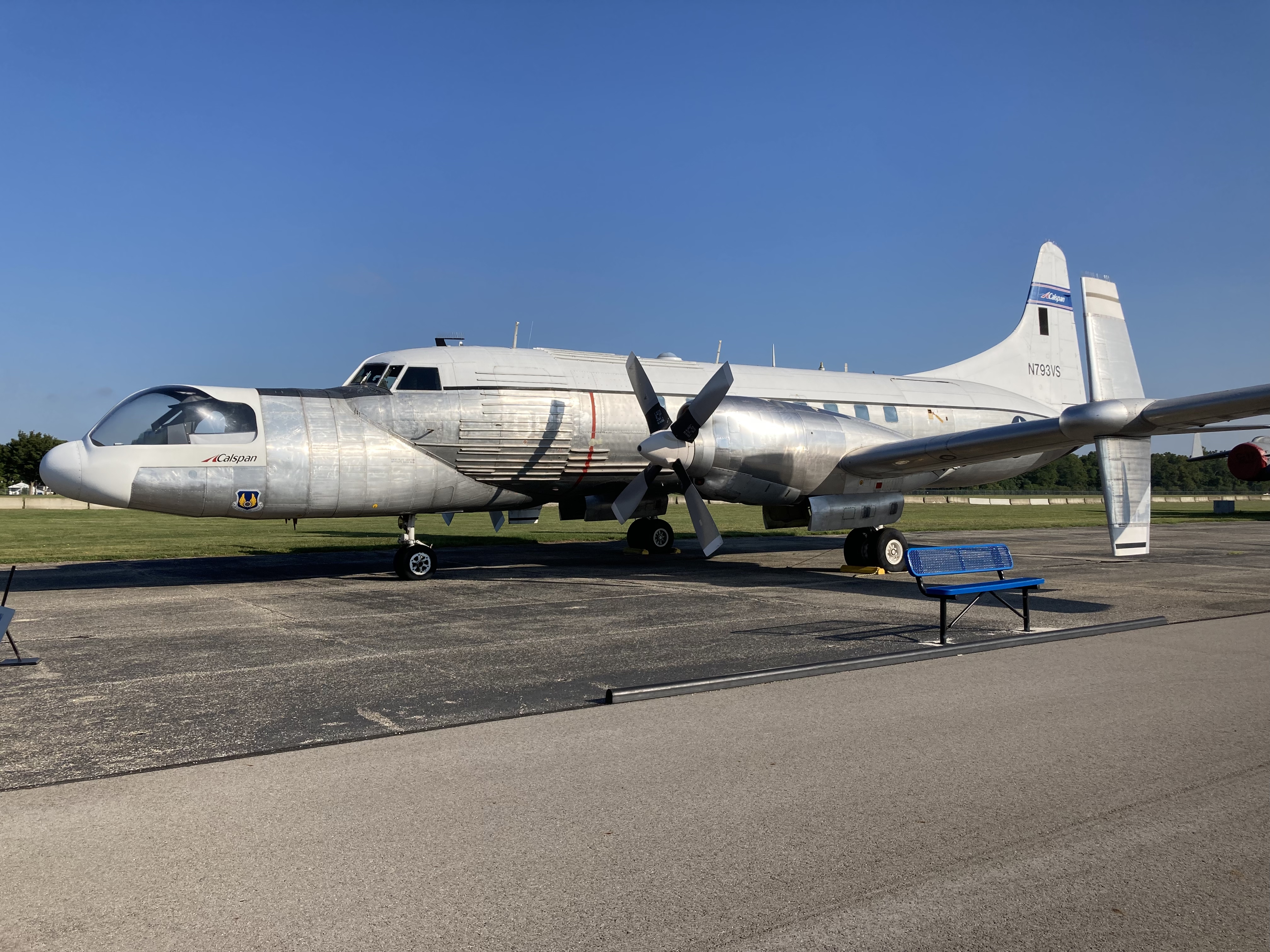
- Convair NC-131H at the Airpark section of the National Museum of the United States Air Force

General information
- Type: In-Flight Simulator
- Manufacturer: Convair
- Status: Retired, on display at the National Museum of the United States Air Force
- Primary user: United States Air Force
- Number built: 1

History
- Manufactured: Late 1960s
- Introduction date: 1971
- First flight: 1970
- Retired: 2008
- Developed from: Convair C-131 Samaritan

The Convair NC-131H Samaritan, also known as the Total In-Flight Simulator (TIFS), is a modified Convair C-131 Samaritan that was used to study aircraft handling characteristics. Built as a C-131B, the aircraft underwent extensive conversion and modification by the United States Air Force, NASA, Calspan and others from the late 1960s until the 2000s. TIFS' maiden flight was in 1970.

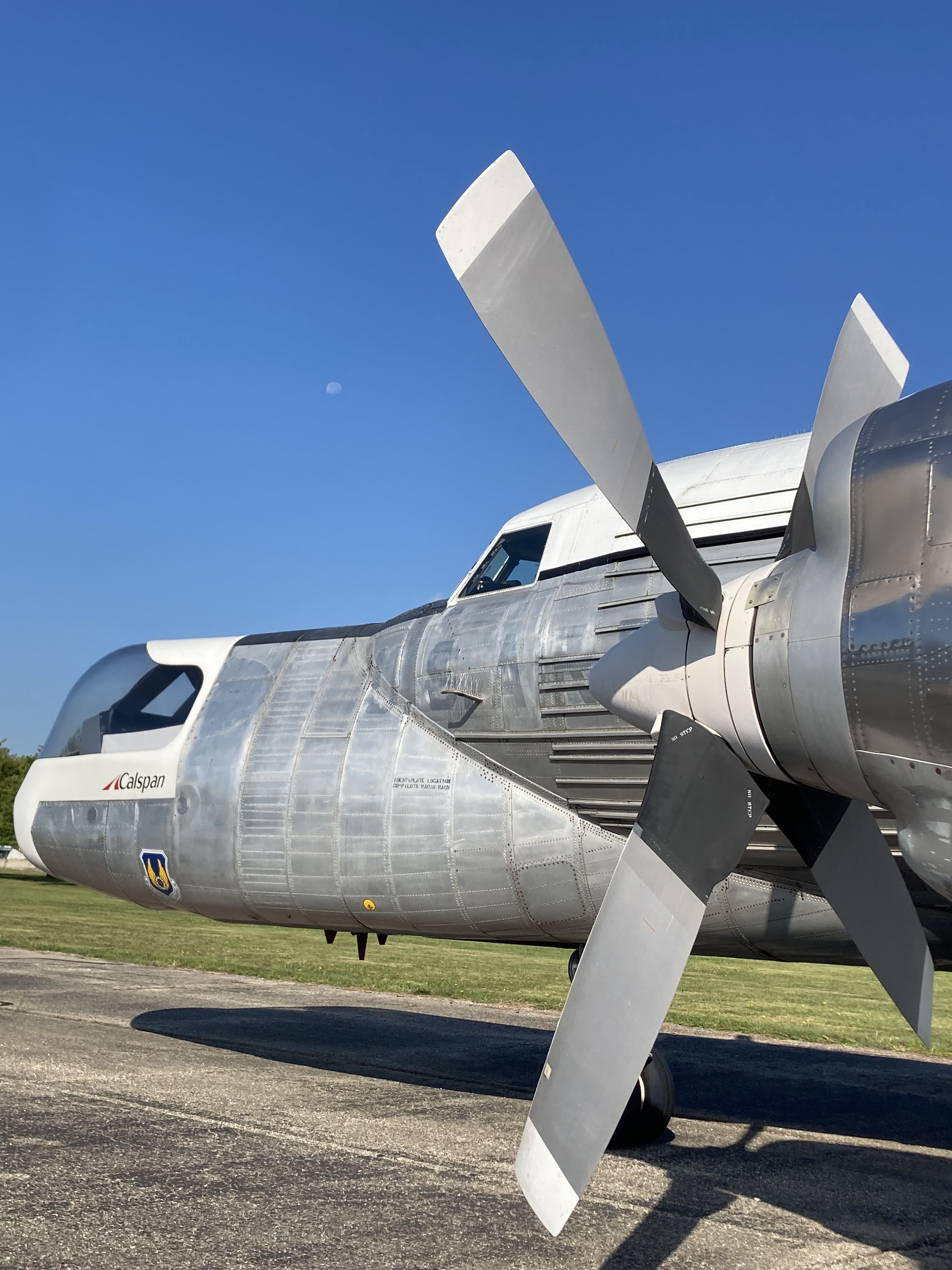
NC-131 showing off its elongated nose for simulation

== Design and development ==
The aircraft, at the time, a C-131B transport, was modified with assistance from NASA, into the NC-131B Control Configured Vehicle, a variable stability aircraft. It would go on to experience further modification, being re-engined and re-designated as the NC-131H by the USAF Research Labs (AFRL). The "N" in the designation indicates that the aircraft had been permanently (ergo, extensively) modified. TIFS is hailed by Calspan as a "cost effective and efficient test-bed aircraft" with a "spacious cabin and replaceable nose." its use was intended for programs with large equipment needs. The TIFS is equipped with a removable, modular simulation cockpit.

The original piston engines were replaced by turboprop engines a second cockpit was added, and vertical fins were installed on the wings to provide side forces, simulating crosswinds to provide test data. The aircraft is owned by the Flight Dynamics Laboratory (FDL), but is operated and maintained by The Calspan Corporation (originally Cornell Aeronautical Labs).

According to Calspan, the computers onboard TIFS were designed for ease of programming allowing rapid turnaround and system changes. This is to increase the efficiency (and thus, profitability) of hosting and checkout of customer software. Since the simulation is not critical to safety of flight, changes can be made without extensive verification and validation, allowing onboard flight test engineers to reprogram the system in flight if necessary.

== Operational history ==
The TIFS first flew in 1970, and its first research project helped devise the B-1 bomber's flying characteristics. Over its 40-year career, the TIFS has been continuously modernized to simulate and aid in the development of many military, NASA, and Civilian aircraft, including the Boeing X-40, Northrop Tacit Blue, Space Shuttle, Northrop Grumman B-2 Spirit, Northrop YF-23, Boeing C-17 Globemaster III, Boeing SST, McDonnell Douglas MD-12 and IPTN N-250.

Engineers also utilize the TIFS for studying how large aircraft handle during critical phases of flight like takeoff and landing.

During the Martin Marietta Smart Weapons Program, TIFS was modified to replicate an intelligent cruise missile.

== Aircraft on display ==
In 2008, sole NC-131H was moved to the National Museum of the United States Air Force in Dayton, Ohio. As of 2024, the aircraft remains on display in the Air Park outside the museum.

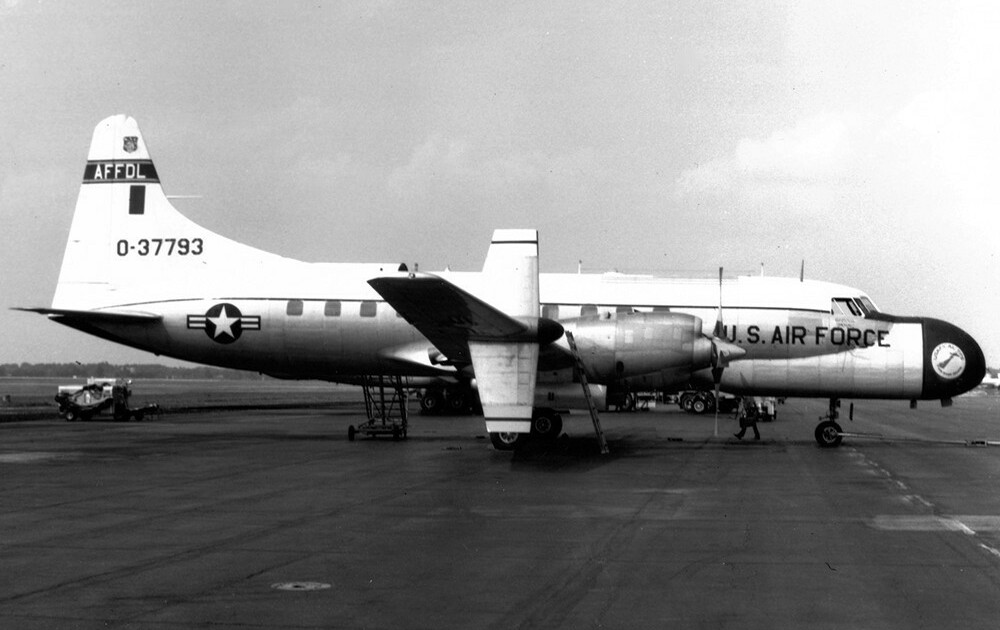
Circa 1995, photographer: USAF photo

== Specifications ==
Data from United States Military Aircraft since 1909 (Note specs might not be 100% accurate they are educated guesses)

General characteristics

- Crew: 5
- Length: 85 ft 0 in (25.908 m)
- Wingspan: 106 ft 0 in (32.3 m)
- Height: 28 ft 0 in (8.59 m)
- Wing area: 920 sq ft (85.5 m^{2})
- Empty weight: 57,000 lb (25,855 kg)
- Max takeoff weight: 135,000 lb (61,235 kg)
- Powerplant: 2 × Allison 501-D22G Turboprop engine, 4,368 hp (3212.659 kW) each

Performance

- Maximum speed: 570 mph (917 km/h, 500 kn)
- Range: 1,610 mi (2,590 km, 1,400 nmi)
- Service ceiling: 40,000 ft (12,192 m)
- Rate of climb: 4,500 ft/min (22.9 m/s)
