= Canadair CC-109 Cosmopolitan =

Military transport aircraft

CC-109 Cosmopolitan CL-66
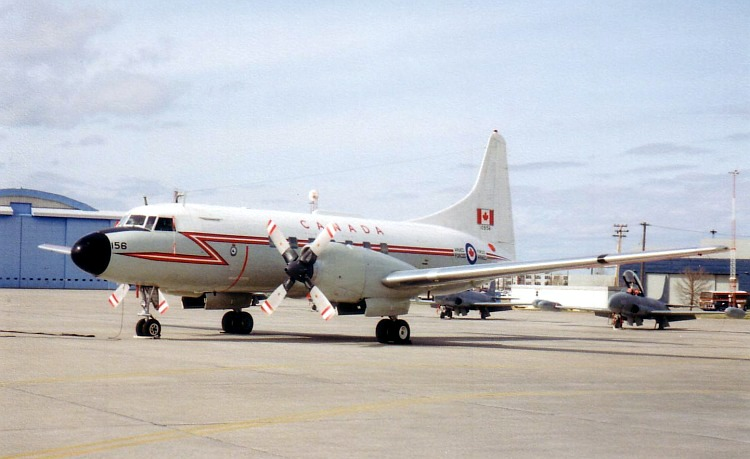
- A CC-109 Cosmopolitan of 412 Squadron at CFB Cold Lake in 1985

General information
- Type: Transport aircraft
- Manufacturer: Canadair
- Primary users: Royal Canadian Air Force Canadian Armed Forces
- Number built: 13

History
- Manufactured: 1959, 1966 (reconfigured variant)
- Introduction date: 1960
- First flight: 2 February 1959
- Retired: 1994
- Developed from: Convair 440
- Variant: Convair 540

The Canadair CL-66 is a turboprop version of the civilian Convair CV-440 Metropolitan. The CC-109 Cosmopolitan or "Cosmo" in RCAF service became the standard VIP aircraft as well as replacing the Douglas Dakota and the North American B-25 Mitchell in light transport duties. After a lengthy career stretching into the 1990s, the CC-109 was replaced by the CC-142 Dash 8 and CC-144 Challenger.

== Design and development ==
With the close of production of the Convair CV-440 in San Diego, Canadair acquired the rights to the design along with the jigs, tooling and even three unsold 440s. With the availability of a Napier Eland turboprop conversion, the re-engined CV-440s became the CV-540, an all-cargo variant.

In 1958, the RCAF wanted to replace their aging C-47 Dakotas with a turbine-powered aircraft. Their choice was the Vickers Viscount, but the Canadian government decided against this aircraft. Instead, Canadair offered a series of CV-540 variants powered by Napier Eland turboprops. The project was given the number CL-66 and three versions were considered. The CL-66A was to be a 48/64 passenger aircraft. The CL-66B designed to be a cargo/passenger configuration with a payload of 14200 lb. The CL-66C used the Convair-built CV-440s, having only their new engines fitted at Canadair.

The first CL-66 to fly was a "C" version with its first flight in February 1959; the CL-66B had its first flight in January 1960. No "A" versions were built.

== Operational history ==
Canadair was not able to get contracts from any major airline for the CL-66. It was too expensive and other similar types had better performance. The two aircraft, both of them CL-66Cs, that had been used for extensive sales demonstrations, were sold to the local carrier Quebecair. The RCAF took ten aircraft, mainly Bs. The Eland not only proved to be unreliable, but also did not deliver the expected power, consequently, the RCAF instituted an engine upgrade in 1966–1967, installing Allison 501-D36 engines. After eight airframes had been re-engined, the company phased out further development work on the type, "orphaning" the remaining two Eland-powered examples, which were subsequently scrapped.

No. 412 Squadron at CFB Ottawa (S), or "Uplands" flew the "Cosmo", from 1960 to 1994 as VIP transport. The Cosmopolitan aircraft were also deployed to Europe for Canadian NATO contingent support as well as to the US in support of Canadian NORAD operations.

== Operators ==
Military

Canada

- Royal Canadian Air Force
- Canadian Armed Forces
  - used at CFB Lahr in support for Canadian operations for NATO and NORAD in Europe

== Specifications (CL-66 – Eland) ==
Data from Jane's All The World's Aircraft 1961–62

General characteristics

- Crew: 3 or 4
- Capacity:
  - 64 passengers
  - Payload: 12,939 lb (5,869 kg)
- Length: 81 ft 6 in (24.84 m) (with nose radar)
- Wingspan: 105 ft 4 in (32.11 m)
- Height: 28 ft 2 in (8.59 m)
- Wing area: 963.82 sq ft (89.542 m^{2})
- Aspect ratio: 12:1
- Airfoil: NACA 63.4-120
- Empty weight: 32,333 lb (14,666 kg)
- Max takeoff weight: 53,200 lb (24,131 kg)
- Fuel capacity: 1,690 imp gal (2,030 US gal; 7,700 L)
- Powerplant: 2 × Napier Eland NE1.6 Mk 504A turboprops, 3,500 shp (2,600 kW) each (eshp)
- Propellers: 4-bladed de Havilland constant-speed propellers, 13 ft 6 in (4.11 m) diameter

Performance

- Maximum speed: 340 mph (550 km/h, 300 kn)
- Cruise speed: 322 mph (518 km/h, 280 kn) at 20,000 ft (6,100 m) and 46,000 lb (21,000 kg)
- Stall speed: 92 mph (148 km/h, 80 kn)
- Range: 1,244 mi (2,002 km, 1,081 nmi) (48 passengers, 45 min reserves)
- Ferry range: 2,275 mi (3,661 km, 1,977 nmi) (extra fuel)
- Time to altitude: 6.4 min to 10,000 ft (3,000 m)

== See also ==
- Military transport aircraft

Related development

- Convair CV-240 family
- Convair C-131 Samaritan

Related lists

- List of aircraft of Canada's air forces
