= Convair C-131 Samaritan =

1954 airlifter series by Convair

C-131 Samaritan R4Y / T-29
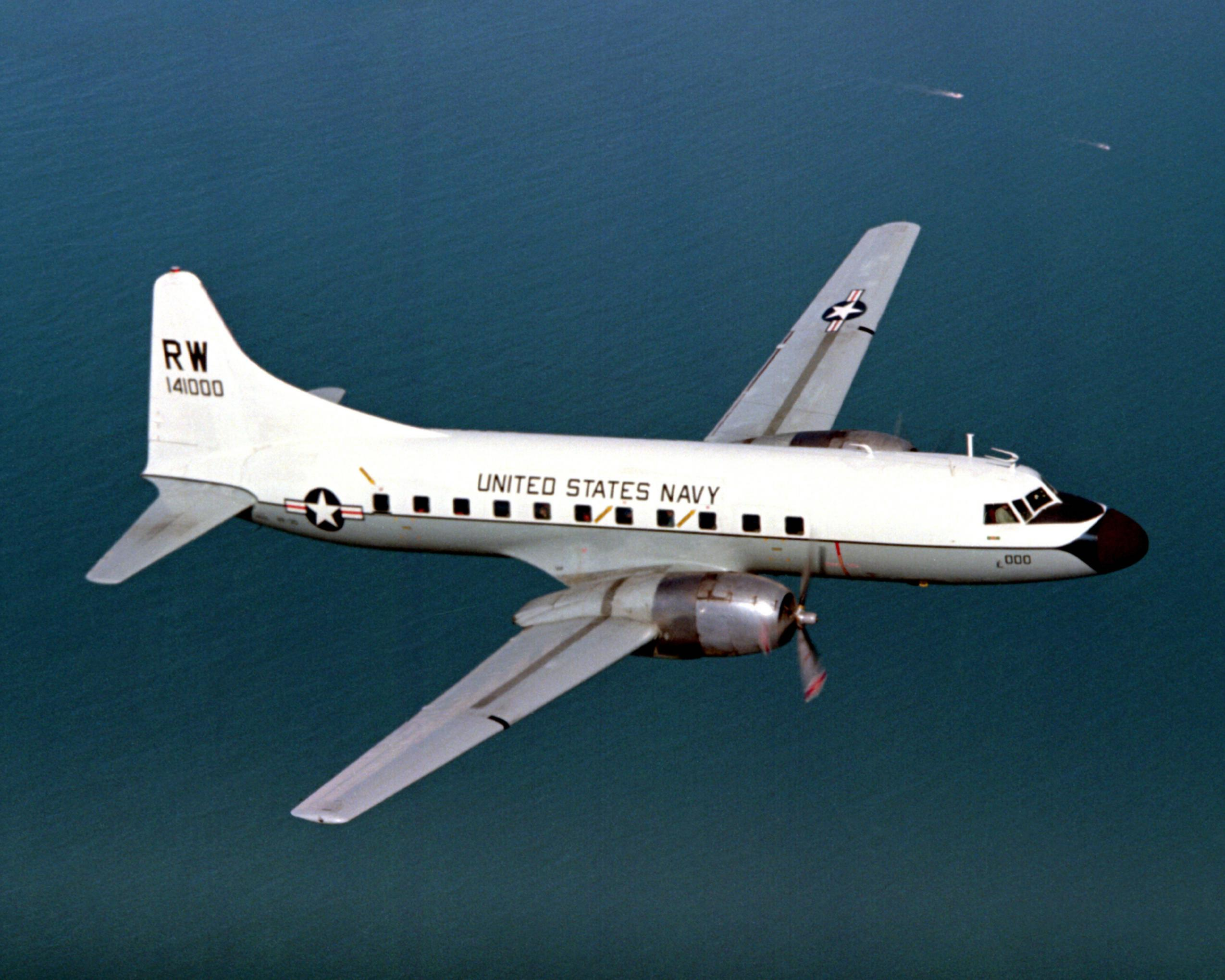
- Convair C-131F Samaritan

General information
- Type: Military transport
- Manufacturer: Convair
- Primary users: United States Air Force United States Navy; United States Marine Corps; United States Coast Guard
- Number built: 512

History
- Introduction date: 1950
- First flight: 22 September 1949
- Retired: 1990
- Developed from: Convair CV-240
- Variant: NC-131H TIFS

The Convair C-131 Samaritan is an American twin-engined military transport produced from 1954 to 1956 by Convair. It is the military version of the Convair CV-240 family of airliners.

This was one of the last radial engined aircraft in US service, along with the Grumman C-1 Trader.

== Design and development ==
The design began life in a production requirement by American Airlines for a pressurized airliner to replace the Douglas DC-3. Convair's original design had two engines and 40 seats, and thus it was designated the CV-240. The first CV-240 flew on March 16, 1947, and production aircraft were first delivered to American on February 28, 1948. Seventy-five were delivered to American, with another fifty going to Western Airlines, Continental Airlines, Pan American Airways, KLM, Sabena, Swissair and Trans Australia Airlines.

== Operational history ==
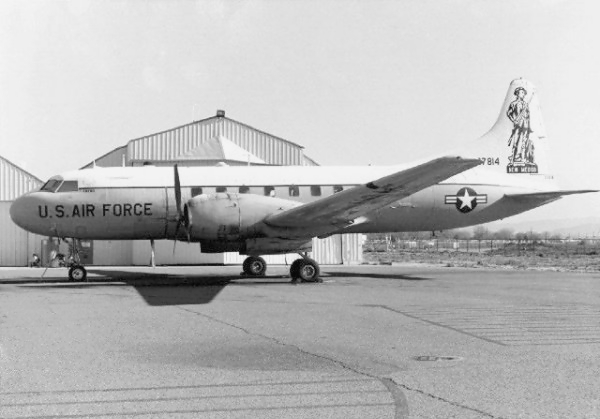
A C-131B used by the New Mexico Air National Guard.

The CV-240/340/440 series was used by the United States Air Force (USAF) for medical evacuation and VIP transport and was designated as C-131 Samaritan. The first model Samaritan, the C-131A, was derived from the CV-240 model, and was delivered to the USAF in 1954.

The initial trainer model, designated the T-29, was also based on the Convair CV-240 and was used to instruct USAF navigators for all USAF aircraft and United States Navy (USN) Naval Flight Officers (NFOs) selected to fly land-based aircraft. The first deliveries to the USAF were made in 1950 followed by large production quantities until early 1955. The USAF and the USN operated T-29s in separate units at separate locations until 1976. In 1974, the USAF T-29s with the 323d Flying Training Wing (323 FTW) at Mather AFB, California began to be replaced by the Boeing 737-derived T-43. In 1975, the Navy retired all of its T-29s assigned to Training Squadron Twenty-Nine (VT-29) at NAS Corpus Christi, Texas, deactivated VT-29, and merged their advanced navigator training program for land-based NFOs with the Air Force's program at Mather AFB.

A planned bomber training version of the T-29 (designated T-32) was never built.

From 1952, the USN and United States Marine Corps (USMC) took delivery of 36 R4Y-1 transport aircraft similar to the commercial CV-340 and USAF C-131D, configured with 44 passenger seats and powered by a pair of 2,500 hp (1,900 kW) Pratt & Whitney R-2800-52W engines. A single otherwise similar aircraft was acquired with a 24-seat VIP interior and designated R4Y-1Z. In 1957, the USN took delivery of two additional aircraft similar to the commercial CV-440 and designated R4Y-2. With the 1962 redesignation of USN/USMC aircraft, the three types were redesignated as the C-131F, VC-131F, and C-131G respectively. A number of R4Y-1 (C-131F) aircraft were converted to R4Y-1Z (VC-131F) or R4Y-2 (C-131G) standards after delivery, and several C-131F and C-131G aircraft were ultimately sold as military surplus and converted to civil use.

Nearly all of the C-131s left the active USAF inventory in the late 1970s, but the U.S. Coast Guard (USCG) operated the aircraft until 1983, while the Air National Guard (ANG) and USN units operated additional C-131 airframes, primarily as Operational Support Aircraft (OSA) for ANG flying wings and as naval air station "station aircraft" until 1990. The C-131 was primarily replaced by the C-9 Nightingale in regular USAF service, with the ANG replacing their OSA with C-130 Hercules aircraft and the USN with C-12 Hurons.

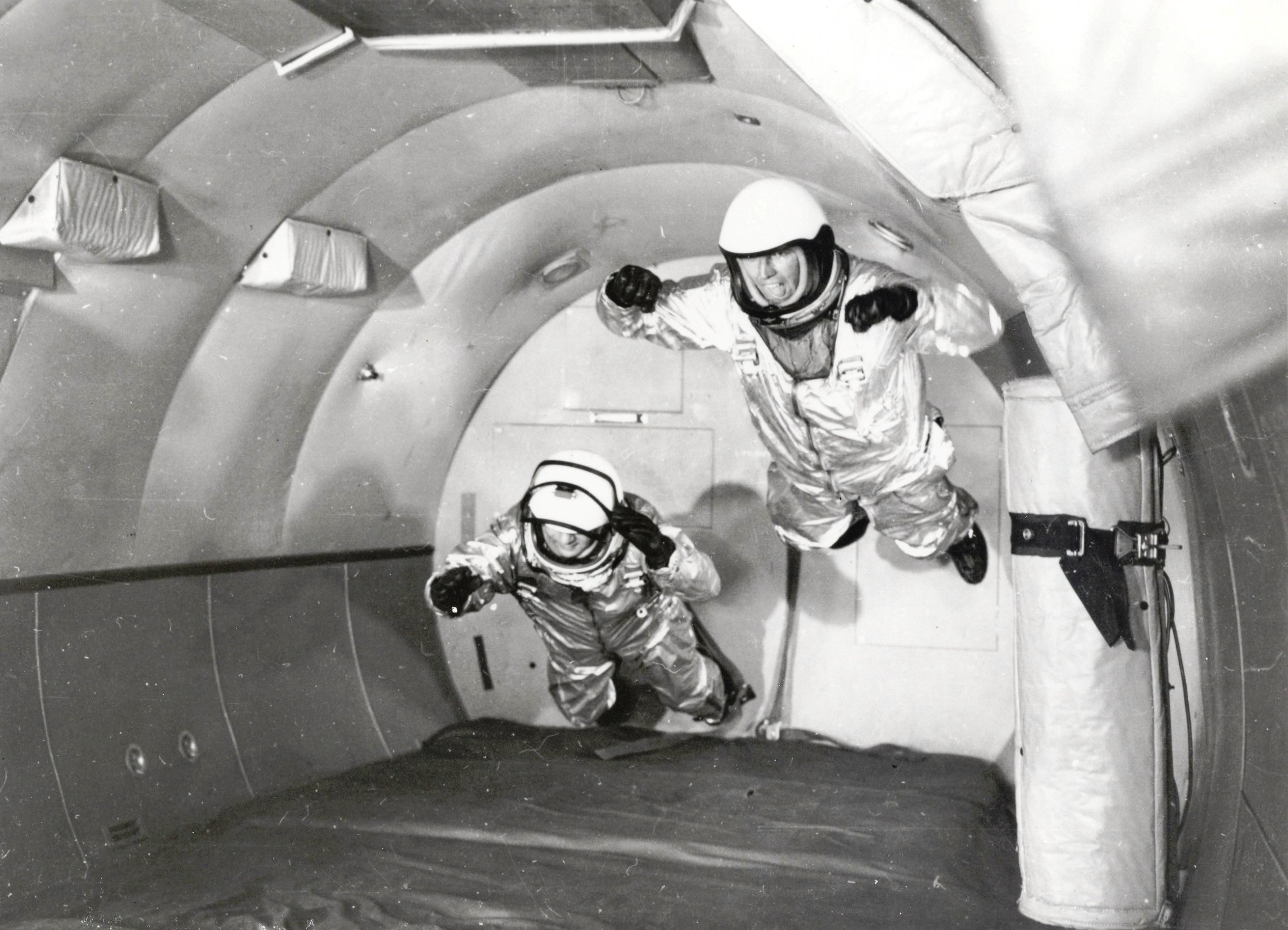
Mercury astronaut training in 1959

In 1959, a C-131 was the first aircraft to be used as a reduced-gravity aircraft or 'vomit comet', for astronaut training as part of Project Mercury.

A Samaritan was the first aircraft used as a flying gunship testbed in mid-1963, in a program known as "Project Tailchaser". A C-131B (AF Ser. No. 53-7820) was given a gunsight for the side window, but instead of guns it had cameras in the cargo area. Eventually the C-131 was ferried to Eglin AFB in Florida and a General Electric SUU-11A/A 7.62 mm Gatling-style Minigun was installed. Live ammunition was used and both over-water and overland tests were successful.

== Accidents and incidents ==
On 17 December 1960, a USAF C-131D Samaritan crashed at Munich after one engine lost power on takeoff from Munich-Riem Airport. Flying in heavy fog and unable to gain altitude, the aircraft struck the steeple of St. Paul's Church and crashed onto a tram, killing all 20 people on the aircraft and 32 on the tram.

== Variants ==
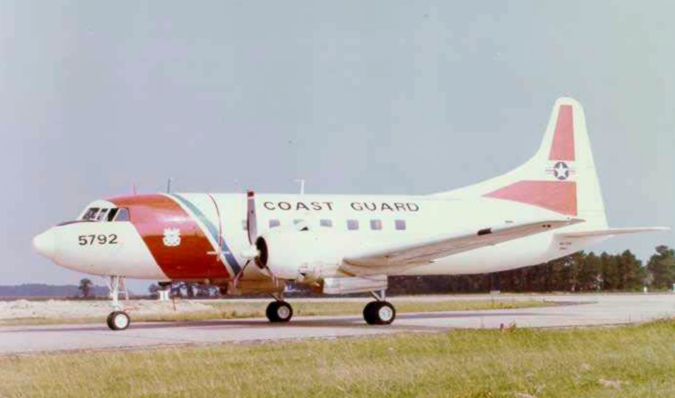
A U.S. Coast Guard HC-131A.

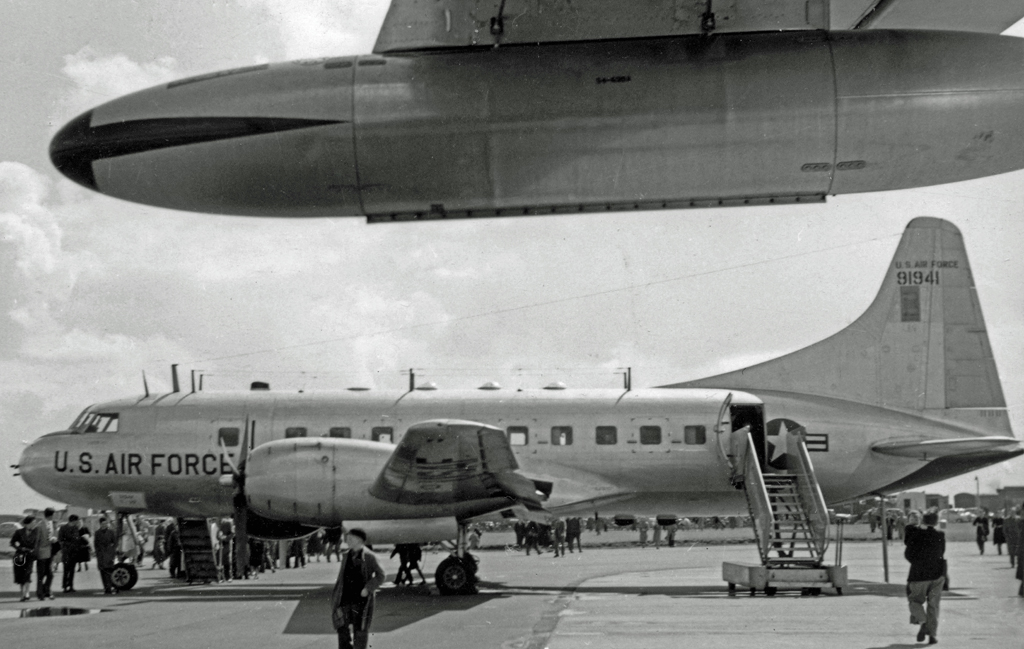
Convair T-29A navigational trainer of the U.S. Air Force with four astrodomes on top of the fuselage

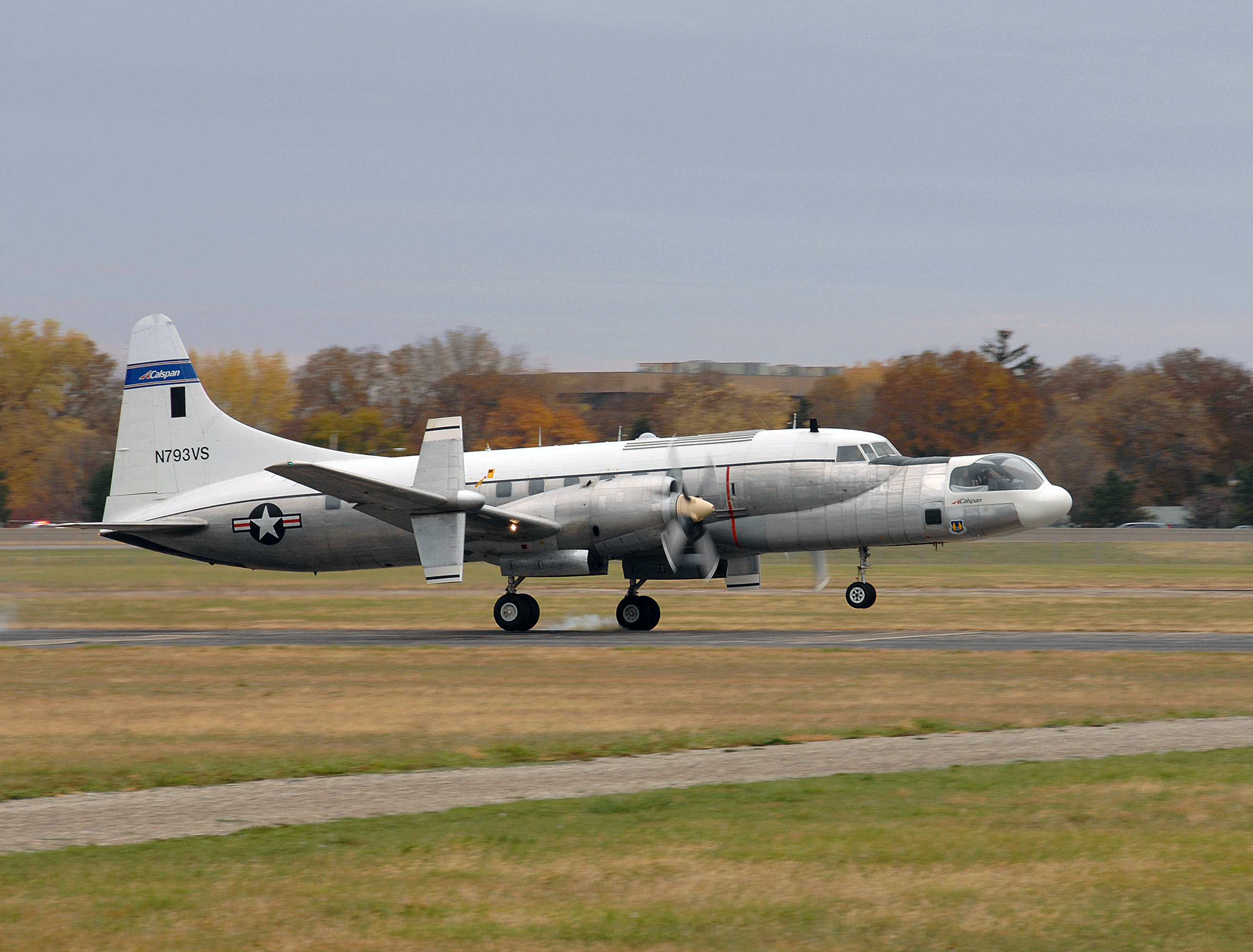
The NC-131H Total-In-Flight Simulator at Wright-Patterson Air Force Base, Ohio

C-131A
Transport for USAF based on CV-240, capable of carrying 39 passengers on rearward facing seats, or 20 stretchers and 7 seats; 26 built.
HC-131A
Surplus C-131As transferred to the USCG, 22 transferred.
MC-131A
C-131A used for medivac duties with 27 stretchers.
VC-131A
C-131A used as a staff transport.
C-131B
A hybrid CV-240/340 with seats for 48 passengers, 36 built.
JC-131B
C-131B converted for missile tracking, six conversions.
NC-131B
One C-131B used for permanent testing.
VC-131B
C-131B when used as a staff transport.
YC-131C
Two CV-340s modified with Alison 501D-13 turboprop engines.
C-131D
Military version of the Model 340 with seats for 44 passengers, 33 built.
VC-131D
C-131D when used as a staff transport.
C-131E
Electronic countermeasures (ECM) training version for Strategic Air Command (SAC), later designated TC-131E, 15 built and one conversion from C-131D, two transferred to United States Navy as R4Y-2.
TC-131E
C-131E redesignated.
C-131F
R4Y-1 redesignated.
RC-131F
Conversions for photo-mapping and survey, six conversions.
VC-131F
R4Y-1Z redesignated.
C-131G
R4Y-2 redesignated.
EC-131G
One C-131G modified as an electronics trainer.
RC-131G
One C-131G modified for airways checking duties.
VC-131G
C-131G when used as a staff transport.
C-131H
Conversions to CV-580 turboprop standard.
NC-131H
One conversion with an extended nose incorporating a separate cockpit as a Total In-Flight Simulator. This aircraft was transferred to the National Museum of the United States Air Force at Wright-Patterson AFB, Ohio on November 7, 2008
R4Y-1
USN/USMC version of CV-340 with 44 passenger seats, redesignated C-131F in 1962, 36 built.
R4Y-1Z
USN/USMC 24-seat VIP staff transport, redesignated VC-131F in 1962, one built and conversions from R4Y-1.
R4Y-2
USN/USMC version of CV-440, redesignated C-131G in 1962, two built and conversions from R4Y-1; an additional 13 canceled, of which six were completed as CV-440 airliners.
R4Y-2Q
Proposed ECM version of the R4Y-2, five canceled.
R4Y-2S
Proposed anti-submarine warfare version of R4Y-2, 14 canceled.
XT-29
Prototype military trainer version of the Model 240 for the United States Air Force, two built.
T-29A
Initial production version for navigator training, unpressurized cabin for 14 students, 46 built.
VT-29A
T-29As converted for staff transport.
T-29B
Pressurized version with room for 10 navigator and four radio operator students, 105 built.
NT-29B
One T-29B used for permanent testing.
VT-29B
T-29B converted for staff transport with seating for 29 or 32 passengers.
T-29C
T-29B with 2,500 hp (1,900 kW) Pratt & Whitney R-2800-29W engines, 119 built.
AT-29C
T-29C modified for airways checking duties, redesignated ET-29C in 1962.
ET-29C
AT-29C redesignated.
VT-29C
T-29C converted to staff transport.
T-29D
Bombardier training version of the T-29C with room for six students, 93 built.
ET-29D
Airways checking conversion of the T-29D.
VT-29D
Staff transport conversion of the T-29D.
XT-29E
Proposed turboprop version of T-29B, none built.
YT-32
Proposed bomber training version with transparent nose, none built.

== Operators ==
Paraguay

- Paraguayan Air Force operated one former USAF Convair C-131D

United States

- United States Air Force operated T-29 and C-131 aircraft.
- United States Navy operated R4Y/C-131 and T-29 aircraft.
- United States Coast Guard operated R4Y/C-131 aircraft.
- NASA

== Surviving aircraft ==
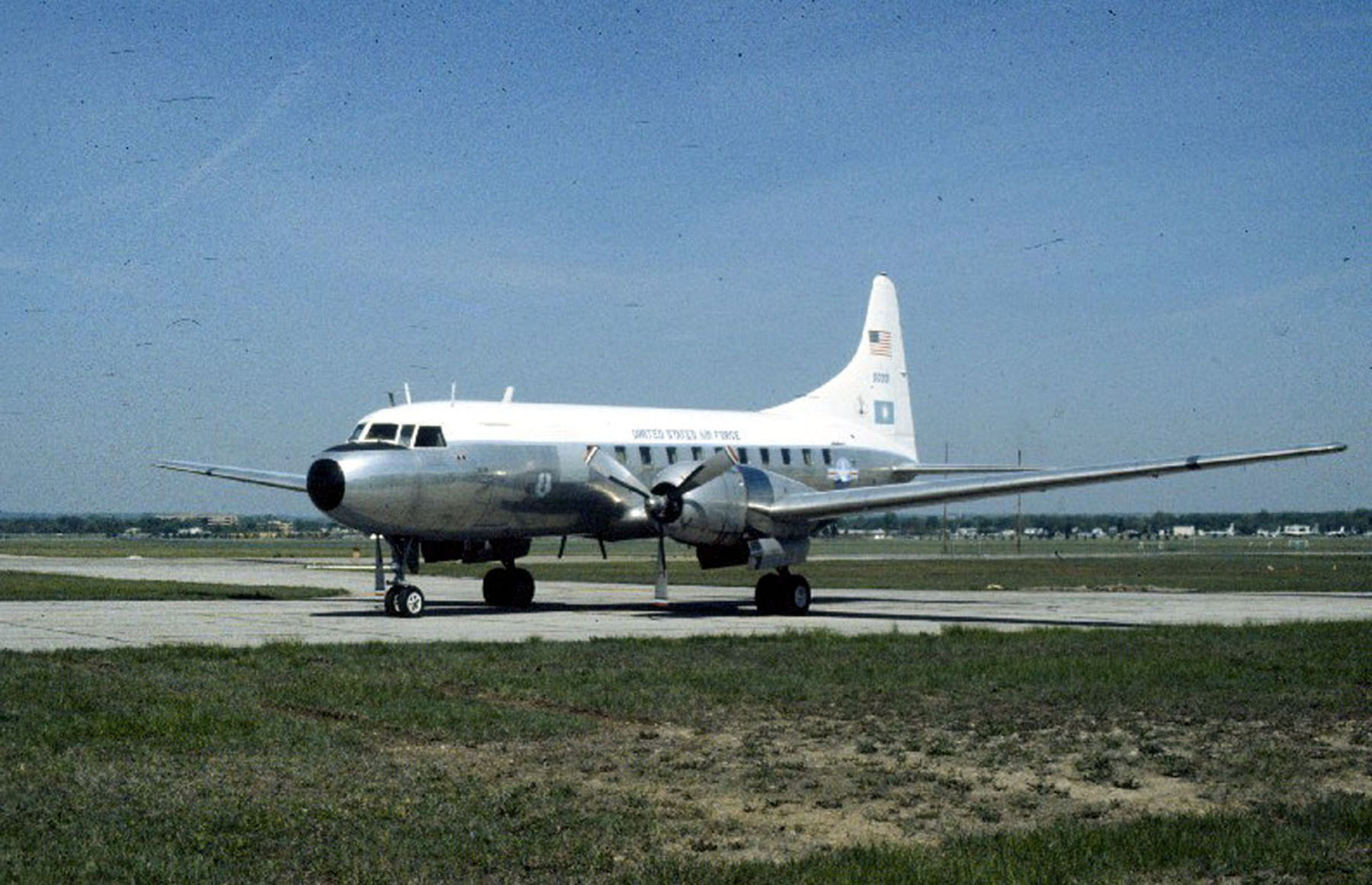
Convair C-131D of the U.S. Air Force Museum at Dayton, Ohio.

HC-131A

- 52-5794 – On display at the Pueblo Weisbrod Aircraft Museum in Pueblo, Colorado.

C-131A

- 55-4757 – On display at the Minnesota Air National Guard Museum in Minneapolis, Minnesota.

C-131B

- 53-7811 – Last registered to Tatonduk Outfitters Limited in Fairbanks, Alaska. This aircraft was previously on display at the Kelly Field Heritage Museum, Lackland AFB, Texas.
- 53-7819 – Airworthy with Airborne Resources Inc in Midlothian, Texas.
- 53-7821 – On display at the Air Force Armament Museum, Eglin AFB, Florida.

C-131D

- 54-2806 – On display at the Jimmy Doolittle Air & Space Museum, Travis AFB, California.
- 54-2808 – On display at the March Field Air Museum, March ARB (former March AFB), Riverside, California.
- 54-2810 – Stored at Burlington Air National Guard Base in Burlington, Vermont.
- 54-2822 – On display at the Aerospace Museum of California, former McClellan AFB, California.
- 55-0292 – On display at the South Dakota Air and Space Museum, Ellsworth AFB, South Dakota.
- 55-0293 – On display at the Selfridge Military Air Museum, Selfridge Air National Guard Base, Michigan.
- 55-0294 – Formerly on display at The Leonardo in Salt Lake City, Utah, in process of being scrapped as of September 2026.
- 55-0295 – On display at the Air Mobility Command Museum, Dover AFB, Delaware.
- 55-0300 – On display at the Hill Aerospace Museum, Hill AFB, Utah.
- 55-0301 – Cockpit only with unknown owner in Kenosha, Wisconsin. This airframe was previously on display at the National Museum of the United States Air Force, but was scrapped before 2009.

C-131F

- 140996 – Airworthy with Gulf & Caribbean Cargo of Waterford, Michigan.
- 141008 – Airworthy with Conquest Air Inc of Miami Lakes, Florida.
- 141013 – On display at the Yanks Air Museum in Chino, California.
- 141015 – On display at the National Museum of Naval Aviation, NAS Pensacola, Florida.
- 141017 – On display at the Pima Air & Space Museum in Tucson, Arizona.
- 141025 – In storage at the Pima Air & Space Museum in Tucson, Arizona.

NC-131H

- 53-7793 – On display at the National Museum of the United States Air Force in Dayton, Ohio.

T-29A

- 49-1934 – On display at Sheppard AFB, Texas.
- 50-0190 – On display at the Strategic Air and Space Museum in Ashland, Nebraska.

T-29B

- 51-7906 – On display at the Pima Air & Space Museum in Tucson, Arizona.

T-29C

- 53-3489 – On display at the 12th Flying Training Wing area, Randolph AFB, Texas. (previously displayed at former Mather AFB, California; disassembled and relocated following BRAC closure of Mather AFB).
- 52-1175 – On display at the Linear Air Park at Dyess Air Force Base in Abilene, Texas.

== Specifications (C-131B) ==
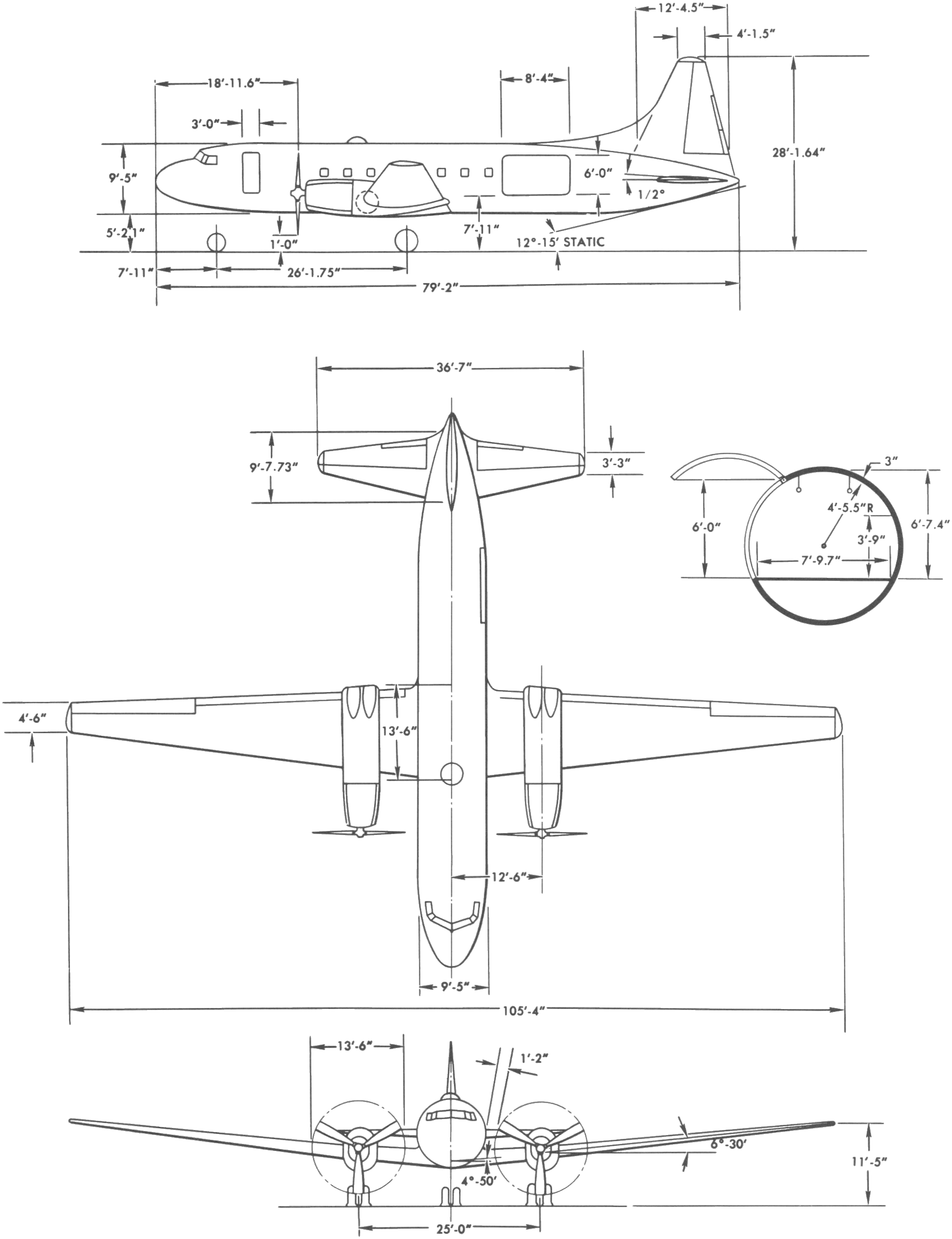
3-view line drawing of the Convair C-131B Samaritan

Data from United States Military Aircraft since 1909

General characteristics

- Crew: four
- Capacity: 48 passengers
- Length: 79 ft 2 in (24.14 m)
- Wingspan: 105 ft 4 in (32.11 m)
- Height: 28 ft 2 in (8.59 m)
- Wing area: 920 sq ft (85.5 m^{2})
- Empty weight: 29,248 lb (13,294 kg)
- Max takeoff weight: 47,000 lb (21,363 kg)
- Powerplant: 2 × Pratt & Whitney R-2800-99 "Double Wasp" 18 cylinder air cooled radial engines, 2,500 hp (1,865 kW) each

Performance

- Maximum speed: 293 mph (472 km/h, 255 kn)
- Cruise speed: 254 mph (409 km/h, 221 kn)
- Range: 450 mi (725 km, 391 nmi)
- Service ceiling: 24,500 ft (7,470 m)
- Rate of climb: 1,410 ft/min (7.2 m/s)

== See also ==
- Military transport aircraft

Related development

- Canadair CC-109 Cosmopolitan
- Convair CV-240 family

Aircraft of comparable role, configuration, and era

- Airspeed Ambassador
- Vickers VC.1 Viking

Related lists

- List of military aircraft of the United States
- List of United States Navy aircraft designations (pre-1962)
