= Sikorsky CH-37 Mojave =

1953 airlift helicopter series by Sikorsky

CH-37 Mojave HR2S-1 Deuce
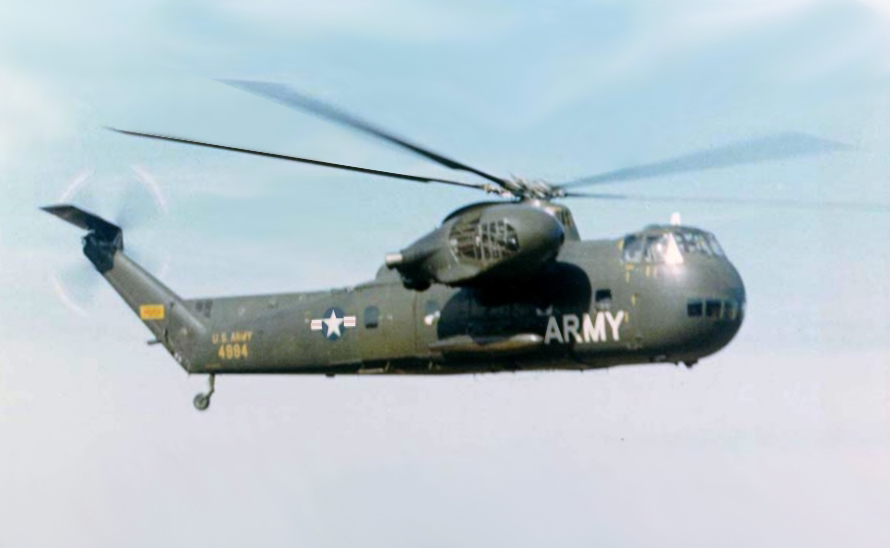
- A H-37 Mojave of the US Army in flight

General information
- Type: Cargo helicopter
- National origin: United States
- Manufacturer: Sikorsky Aircraft
- Status: Retired
- Primary users: United States Army United States Marine Corps
- Number built: 154

History
- Introduction date: July 1956
- First flight: 18 December 1953
- Retired: Late 1960s
- Developed into: Sikorsky S-60; Westland Westminster

The Sikorsky CH-37 Mojave (company designation S-56) is an American large heavy-lift military helicopter of the 1950s. It entered service as the HR2S-1 Deuce with the USMC in 1956, and as the H-37A Mojave with the U.S. Army that same year. In the early 1960s, the designation was standardized to CH-37 for both services, with the HR2S-1 redesignated as CH-37C specifically.

Developed in the early 1950s, with its first flight in 1953, it filled a 1950 Navy requirement for an assault helicopter that could carry up to 20 Marines and haul combat equipment. The design includes a front-loading ramp with side opening clam shell doors on the nose. It was powered by two radial piston engines. It served in active military service well into the 1960s, including in Indochina, before being replaced.

Many ex-military models went onto civilian service in the 1970s. This was the biggest helicopter in the world to enter service at the time, and one of the earliest twin engine models. It was known for being noisy but earned a good reputation for reliability. The Navy adapted it to carry a naval radar, with two entering service as HR2S-1W.

The design led to a production attempt as the Westland Westminster in the United Kingdom; prototypes were produced, but it did not go into full production. The S-56 was also the basis for the S-60 Skycrane helicopter prototype.

== Design and development ==
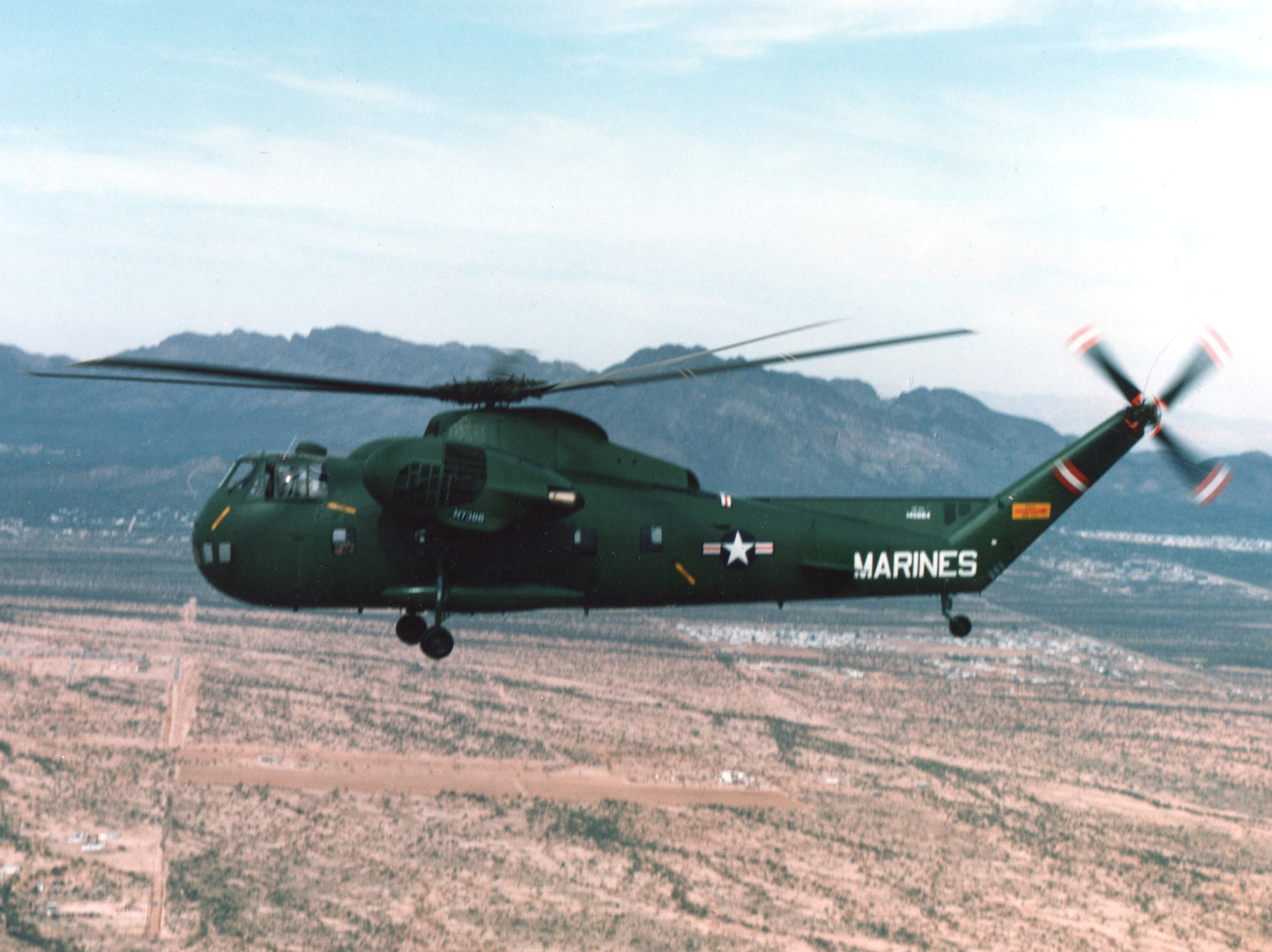
A HR2S-1

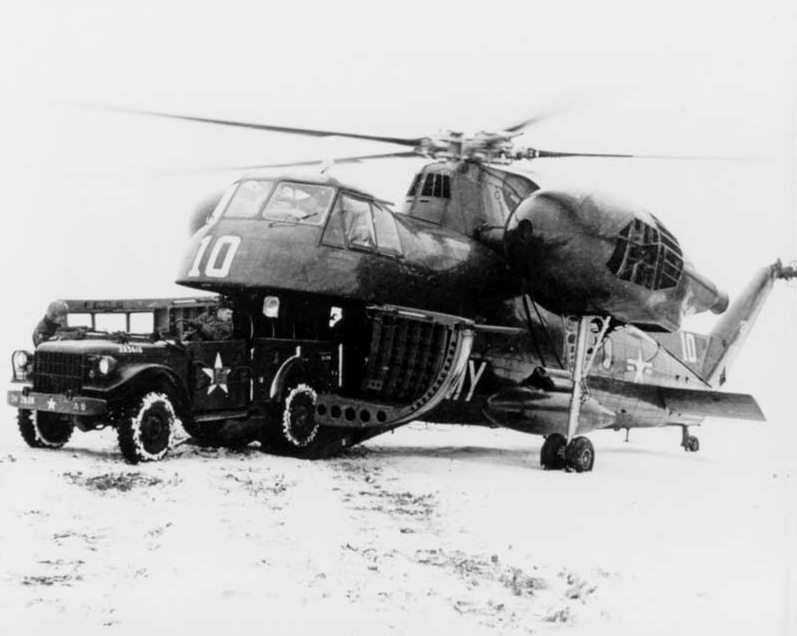
Loading a Dodge WC

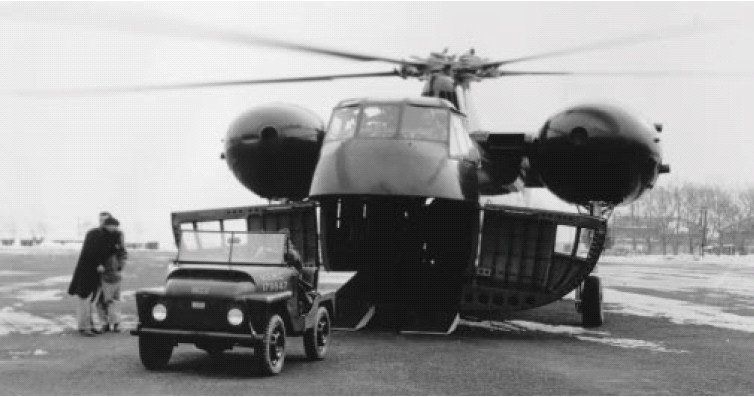
A HR2S-1 with a M422 Mighty Mite

The S-56 came into being as an assault transport for the United States Marine Corps (USMC), with a capacity of 26 fully equipped Marines. An order for the aircraft was placed in 1951 using the U.S. Navy/U.S. Marine Corps designation of the time of HR2S. The first prototype, the XHR2S-1 flew in 1953. Production deliveries of the HR2S-1 "Deuce" began in July 1956 to Marine Helicopter Squadron One (HMX-1), with sixty aircraft being produced.

The HR2S-1 set three records in 1956: a speed record without payload of 162.7 mph (141.4 kts); an altitude record of 12,100 ft (3,688.1 meters) with a 11,023 lbs (5,000 kg) load; and a load carrying record of 13,227 lbs (6,000 kg) to 6,561 feet (2,000 meters).

The United States Army evaluated the prototype in 1954 and ordered 94 examples as the CH-37A, the first being delivered in summer 1956. All Marine Corps and Army examples were delivered by mid-1960. Army examples were all upgraded to CH-37B status in the early 1960s, being given Lear auto-stabilization equipment and the ability to load and unload while hovering. In the 1962 unification of United States military aircraft designations, the USMC examples were redesignated from HR2S-1 to CH-37C.

At the time of delivery, the CH-37 was the largest helicopter in the Western world and it was Sikorsky's first twin-engine helicopter. Two Pratt & Whitney R-2800 Double Wasp radial engines were mounted in outboard pods that also contained the retractable landing gear. This left the fuselage free for cargo, which could be loaded and unloaded through large clamshell doors in the nose. The early models could carry a payload of either three M422 Mighty Mites (a lightweight jeep-like vehicle) or 26 troops. For storage, the main rotor blades folded back on the fuselage and the tail rotor mast folded forward on the fuselage.

The CH-37 was one of the last heavy helicopters to use piston engines, which were larger, heavier and less powerful than the turboshaft engines employed in later military helicopters. This accounted for the CH-37's fairly short service life, all being withdrawn from service by the late 1960s, replaced in Army service by the distantly related CH-54 Tarhe and in the Marine Corps by the CH-53 Sea Stallion.

Six CH-37C's were deployed to Vietnam in September 1965 to assist in the recovery of downed U.S. aircraft, serving in this role from Marble Mountain Air Facility until May 1967. They were very successful at this role, recovering over US$7.5 million worth of equipment, some of which was retrieved from behind enemy lines. The CH-37 was also used to perform mid-air recovery of rocket nose cones at the White Sands Missile Range. 154 were produced by the time production ended. Of those, 94 were H-37A, and 90 that were converted to H-37B, later CH-37A and B respectively. It remains the largest piston powered helicopter.

== Variants ==
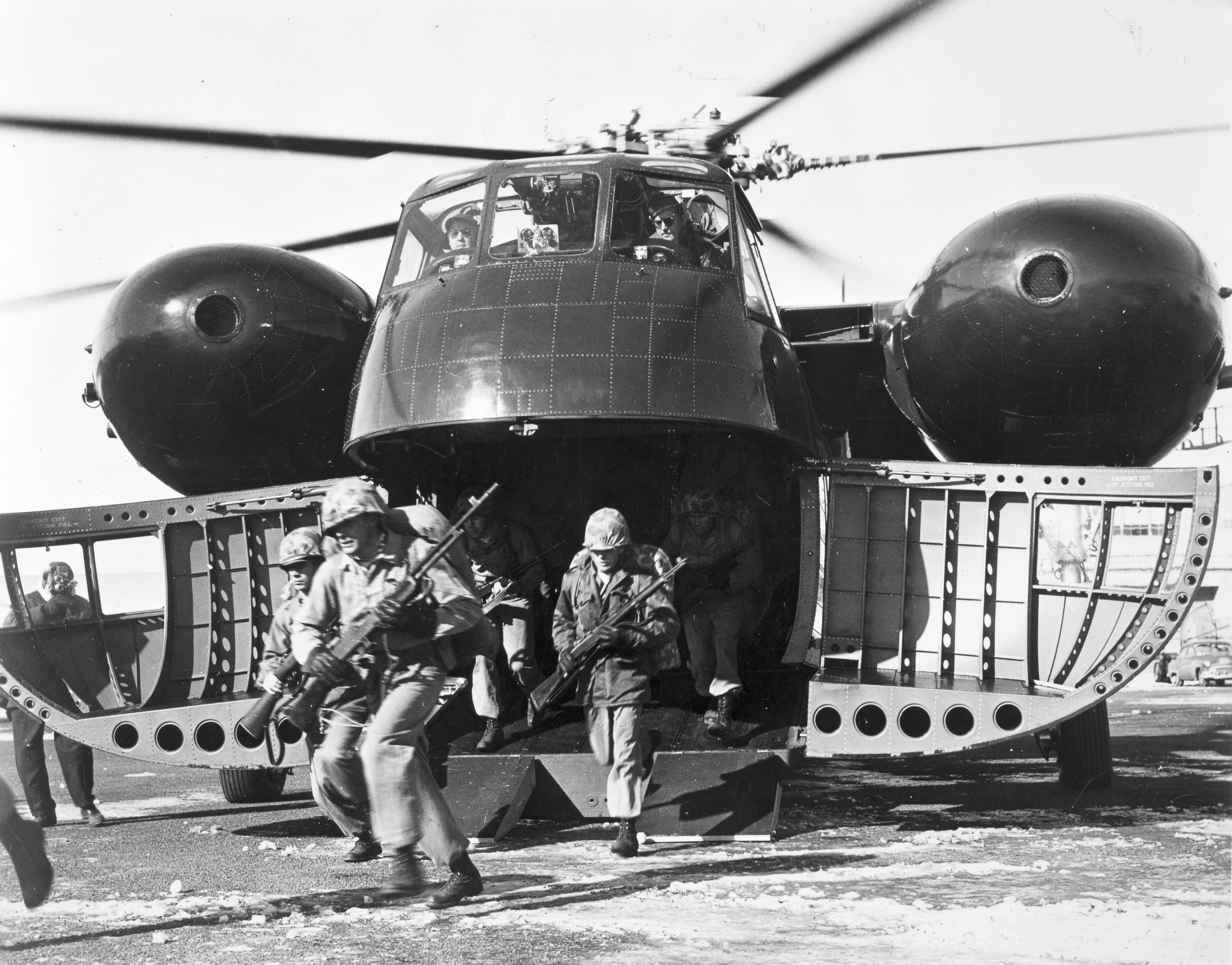
A XHR2S-1 of the USMC

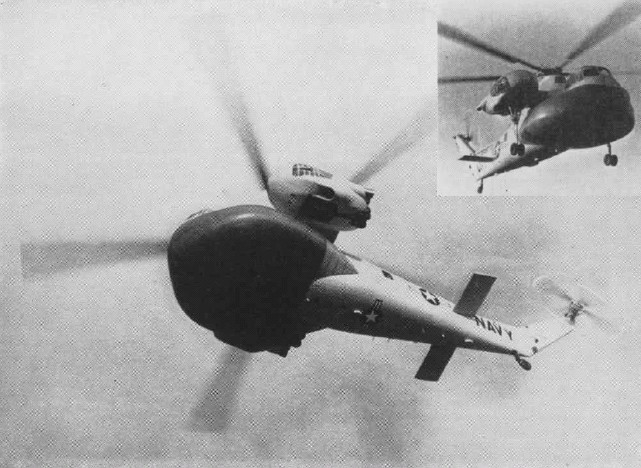
A HR2S-1W early warning helicopter

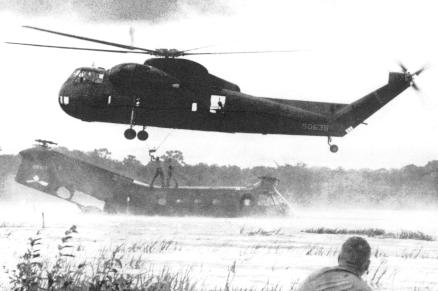
A CH-37 Mojave attempting to lift a crashed Piasecki H-21

XHR2S-1
Prototype Assault Transport for the US Marine Corps, powered by two 1,900 hp (1,400 kW) R-2800-54 engines, four built.
HR2S-1
Production model for the USMC with modified engine nacelles, twin mainwheels and dorsal fin. Redesignated CH-37C in 1962. 55 were built, with an order for an additional 36 cancelled.
HR2S-1W
Airborne early warning aircraft for the US Navy, two built.
H-37
The H-37 followed the HR2S-1 in 1954 as an army helicopter. 94 were built between 1954 and 1960. It is credited with a maximum speed of 126 mph.
H-37A Mojave
Military transport version of the HR2S for the US Army, changes included dorsal fin and modified rotor head fairing, redesignated CH-37A in 1962, 94 built.
H-37B Mojave
All but four of the H-37As were modified with a redesigned cargo door, automatic stabilization equipment and crashproof fuel cells. Engine oil tank capacity was increased from 13.3 gallons to 30 gallons per engine. Rear split cargo door was replaced with a sliding cargo door. Later redesignated CH-37B.
CH-37A
H-37A redesignated in 1962.
CH-37B
H-37B redesignated in 1962.
CH-37C
HR2S-1 redesignated in 1962.
S-56
Sikorsky company designation for H-37.

=== Derivatives and related projects ===
Sikorsky S-60
a prototype "sky-crane" with a skeletal fuselage and a crew cockpit at the front.
Westland Westminster
Unable to get government support for license production of the civil S-56, Westland Aircraft used the S-56 control systems, rotors and gearbox as the basis for the Westminster but used their own tubular frame and twin 2,900 hp (2,200 kW) Napier Eland turboshafts for power in a flying test rig. Due to vibration they changed to a six-bladed S-64 rotor. The private venture project was ended when Westland took over three British helicopter companies and their more advanced and funded projects.

== Operators ==
United States

- United States Army
- United States Marine Corps
  - HMR(M)-461 1957–1966
  - HMR(M)-462 1957–1965
  - HMR(M)-463 1958–1959

== Survivors ==
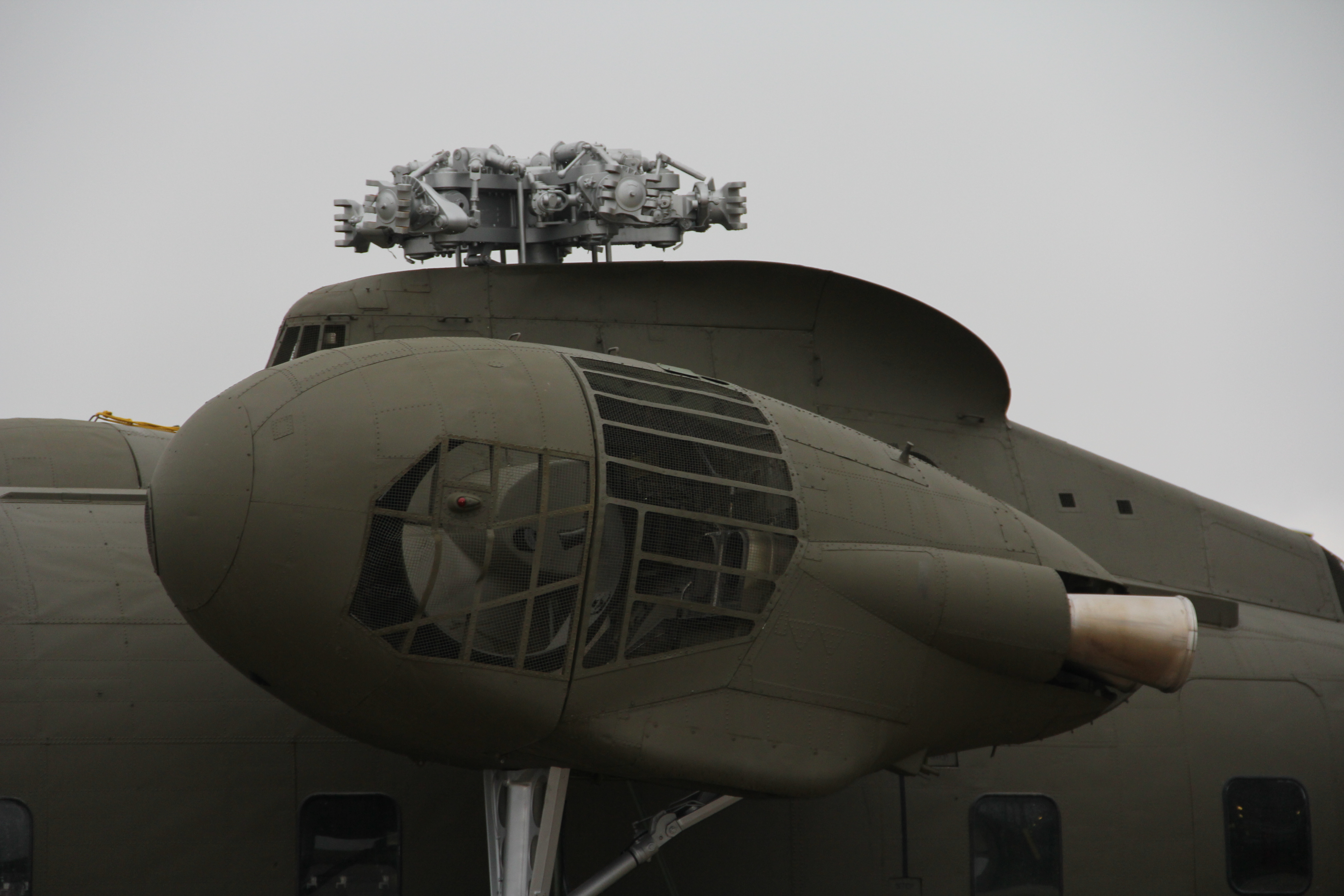
Closeup of the engine nacelle housing the Double Wasp radial engine on the Evergreen Aviation & Space Museum's Sikorsky CH-37B

- CH-37B (Army Ser. No. 55-0644) is on display at the United States Army Aviation Museum at Fort Novosel, Alabama.
- CH-37B (Army Ser. No. 58-1005) "Tired Dude" is on display at the Pima Air and Space Museum adjacent to Davis-Monthan Air Force Base in Tucson, Arizona.
- CH-37B (Army Ser. No. 57-1651) is on display at the U.S. Army Transportation Museum at Fort Eustis, Virginia.
- CH-37B (Army Ser. No. 58-0999) is on display at the Evergreen Aviation & Space Museum in McMinnville, Oregon.
- CH-37C (BuNo 145864) is on display at the National Museum of Naval Aviation at Naval Air Station Pensacola, Florida.
- CH-37B (Army Ser. No. 57-1646) is on display at the Classic Rotors Museum at the Ramona Airport, Ramona, California.

== Specifications (CH-37 Mojave) ==
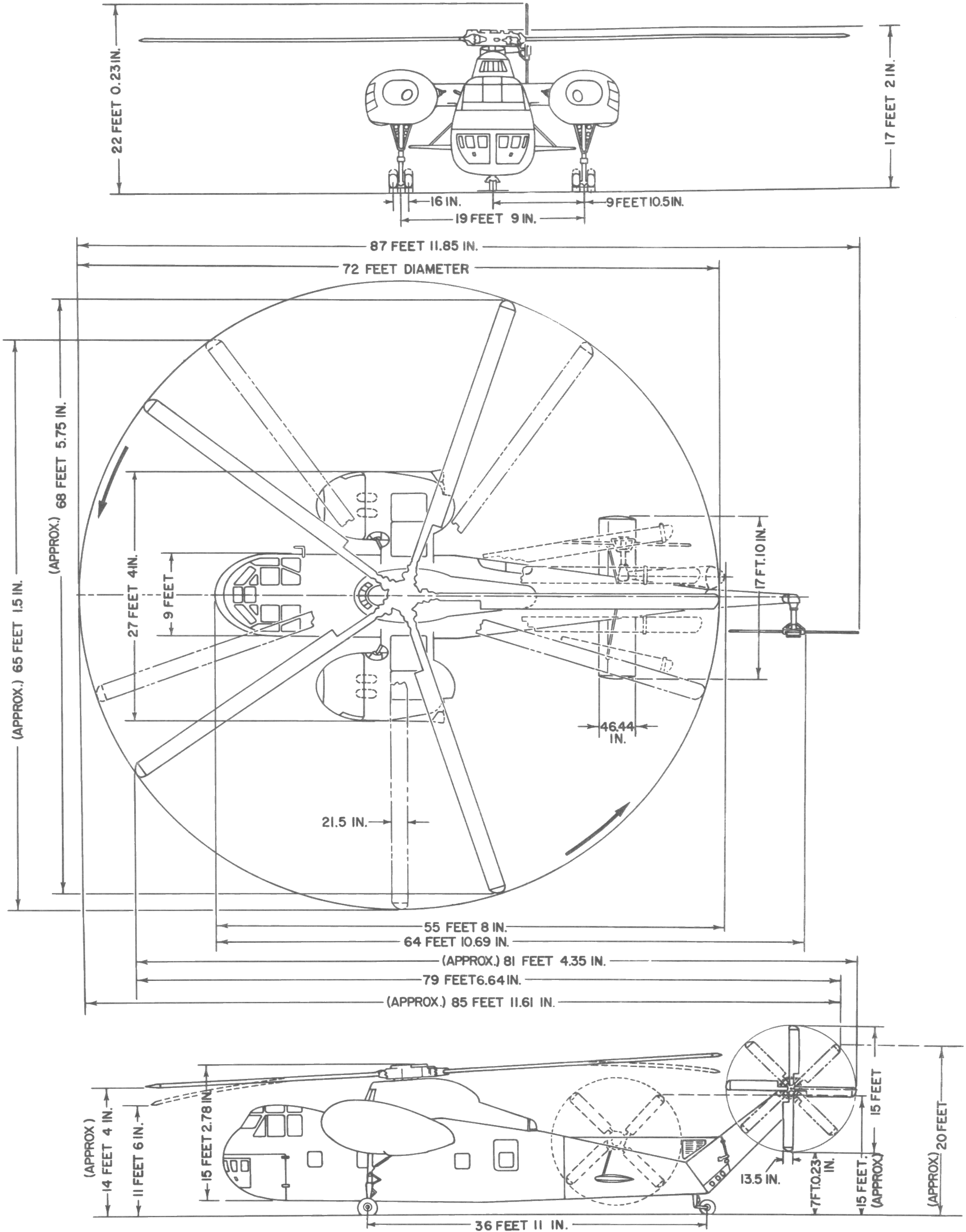
3-view line drawing of the Sikorsky CH-37A Mojave

Data from U.S. Army Aircraft Since 1947

General characteristics

- Crew: three
- Capacity: 26 troops or 24 stretchers
- Length: 64 ft 3 in (19.58 m) fuselage
- Height: 22 ft 0 in (6.71 m)
- Empty weight: 20,831 lb (9,449 kg)
- Max takeoff weight: 31,000 lb (14,061 kg)
- Powerplant: 2 × Pratt & Whitney R-2800-54 Double Wasp 18-cylinder air-cooled radial piston engines, 2,100 hp (1,600 kW) each
- Main rotor diameter: 72 ft 0 in (21.95 m)
- Main rotor area: 4,072 sq ft (378.3 m^{2}) blade section NACA 0012

Performance

- Maximum speed: 113 kn (130 mph, 209 km/h)
- Cruise speed: 100 kn (120 mph, 190 km/h)
- Range: 126 nmi (145 mi, 233 km) with maximum payload
- Service ceiling: 8,700 ft (2,700 m)
- Rate of climb: 910 ft/min (4.6 m/s)

== See also ==
- List of military aircraft of the United States
