= Westland Westminster =

British helicopter

Westminster
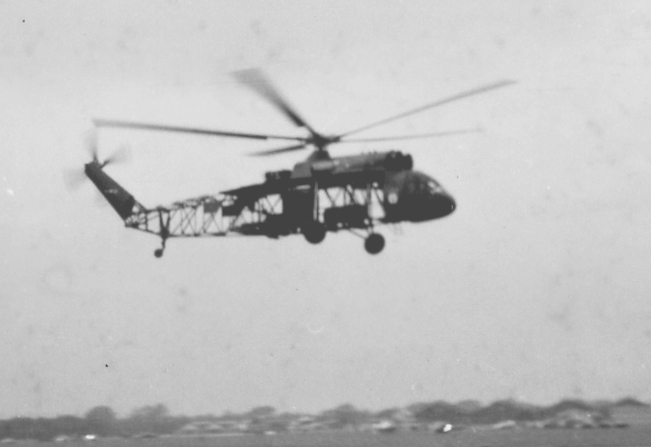
- First prototype G-APLE at Farnborough 1958

General information
- Type: Heavy-lift helicopter
- National origin: United Kingdom
- Manufacturer: Westland Aircraft
- Status: Cancelled
- Number built: 2

History
- First flight: 15 June 1958

The Westland Westminster was a British helicopter of the 1950s from Westland Aircraft. A large cargo design, it was powered by two turboshaft engines driving a single, five-bladed rotor. Initially unclad, the all-metal airframe was later enclosed in a fabric covering. Designed and built as a private venture without government assistance, it was cancelled when Westland took over rival helicopter producers and their more advanced projects.

== Development ==
The Westminster was the first tangible result of efforts that Westland Aircraft had been making throughout the 1950s to produce a gas-turbine-powered heavy-lift helicopter. Projects ranged up to the remarkable W.90, a 450-seat troopship with three Armstrong Siddeley Sapphire turbojets mounted on its rotor-tips.

In 1954, Westland investigated licensed manufacture of the Sikorsky S-56 for the civil market with turboshaft power. The company sought Ministry of Supply support for the proposal, but this was not forthcoming. In June 1958, Westland obtained an extension to their licence agreement with Sikorsky to cover the five bladed main-rotor, gearbox, tail-rotor, transmission and control systems of the S-56. Faced with continuing government indifference, Westland decided to press ahead with a private-venture design for a heavy-lift transport, built around the S-56 systems but powered by a pair of Napier Eland turboshafts. At the time, Westland was heavily committed to development of the Wessex (a turbine powered Sikorsky S-58) and the Westminster project had to be run on a shoestring.

Two variants were initially envisioned: a 40-seat, short-range civil transport and a flying crane with a 15,000 lb (6.8 t) capacity. In March 1956, Westland decided to build the first prototype as a flying test rig with a tubular steel space frame in place of the main fuselage; cockpit power-train and undercarriage attached to this. With economy a priority, off-the-shelf components were used as far as possible, with donors such as the Westland Whirlwind helicopter and the Bristol Freighter aeroplane. This prototype was completed in February 1958; after the usual static and systems testing, engine runs and nearly 20 hours of "tied-down" engine testing, the first flight took place on 15 June. Flight testing showed up significant vibration. As a result, a number of changes were made in the design of the second prototype, including replacement of the main-rotor with the six-blade unit from the Sikorsky S-64 Skycrane. Once the statutory ten hours had been flown, this first Westminster was registered G-APLE and work started on constructing the second prototype.

Around this time, the Admiralty began to feel that the Westminster project was delaying development of the Wessex for the Royal Navy. Although this was mere fancy, it boded ill for the larger aircraft. For the moment, work continued; G-APLE's space frame was covered with a streamlined shell of wood covered with Terylene fabric and the rotor was replaced with an experimental six-blade unit. It first flew in this form on 12 June 1960.

The second prototype, registered G-APTX flew on 5 September 1959 and flight testing continued, but the British helicopter industry was in a state of flux; the entire industry was being consolidated under Westland with the company's purchase of the helicopter divisions of Saunders-Roe, Bristol and Fairey. In the process, Westland acquired two potential rivals to the Westminster: the projected civil Bristol 194 development of the military Bristol Type 192 Belvedere and the Fairey Rotodyne (a gyrodyne design). Rationalisation was necessary and since the Rotodyne was already flying and government funded, work on the Westminster ceased in September 1960.

The two aircraft were broken up; the components supplied by Sikorsky were stripped out and shipped back to the US to avoid paying import duty and the airframes were sold as scrap.

== Specifications ==
Data from Westland Aircraft since 1915

General characteristics

- Crew: 2 (+2 observers projected)
- Capacity: 40 passengers (projected)
- Length: 89 ft 9 in (27.36 m) including rotors
- Fuselage length: 71 ft 4 in (22 m)
- Height: 21 ft 1 in (6.43 m)
- Empty weight: 21,245 lb (9,637 kg)
- Gross weight: 33,000 lb (14,969 kg)
- Powerplant: 2 × Napier E220 Eland turboshaft engine, 2,920 shp (2,180 kW) each equivalent
- Main rotor diameter: 72 ft 0 in (21.95 m)
- Main rotor area: 4,069 sq ft (378.0 m^{2})

Performance

- Maximum speed: 155 mph (249 km/h, 135 kn)
- Cruise speed: 115 mph (185 km/h, 100 kn)
- Range: 120 mi (190 km, 100 nmi) estimated for production model

== See also ==
Aircraft of comparable role, configuration, and era

- CH-37 Mojave

== Bibliography ==
- Ford, Daniel (July–August 2002). "Breaking the Mould: Westland's Westminster Heavy-lifter". Air Enthusiast. No. 100. pp. 46–49. ISSN 0143-5450.
- Green, William (1961). Observer's book of aircraft. London: Frederick Warne & Co. Ltd.
- James, Derek N. Westland Aircraft since 1915. London: Putnam, 1991, ISBN 0-85177-847-X.
