= RBM6 =

Protein-coding gene in the species Homo sapiens

Identifiers
- Aliases: RBM6, 3G2, DEF-3, DEF3, HLC-11, NY-LU-12, g16, RNA binding motif protein 6
- External IDs: OMIM: 606886; MGI: 1338037; GeneCards: RBM6

Gene location (Human)
Chr.	Chromosome 3 (human)
Band	3p21.31	Start	49,940,007 bp
Band	3p21.31	End	50,100,045 bp

Gene location (Mouse)
Chr.	Chromosome 9 (mouse)
Band	9|9 F1	Start	107,650,758 bp
Band	9|9 F1	End	107,750,436 bp
RNA expression pattern
Bgee	Human / Mouse (ortholog); Top expressed in: canal of the cervix; gastric mucosa; right uterine tube; right ovary; granulocyte; cerebellar hemisphere; body of uterus; right hemisphere of cerebellum; left ovary; anterior pituitary / Top expressed in: genital tubercle; tail of embryo; neural layer of retina; ventricular zone; spermatocyte; zygote; ganglionic eminence; morula; secondary oocyte; superior frontal gyrus; More reference expression data
BioGPS	n/a
Gene ontology
Molecular function	DNA binding; protein binding; nucleic acid binding; RNA binding
Cellular component	nucleus
Biological process	RNA processing
Sources:Amigo / QuickGO
Orthologs
Databases	NCBI: entry; OMA: entry
Species	Human	Mouse
Entrez	10180	19654
Ensembl	ENSG00000004534	ENSMUSG00000032582
UniProt	P78332	n/a
RefSeq (mRNA)	NM_001167582; NM_005777; NM_001349190; NM_001349191; NM_001349192 NM_001349193; NM_001349194	NM_011251; NM_029169
RefSeq (protein)	NP_001161054; NP_005768; NP_001336119; NP_001336120; NP_001336121 NP_001336122; NP_001336123	n/a
Location (UCSC)	Chr 3: 49.94 – 50.1 Mb	Chr 9: 107.65 – 107.75 Mb
PubMed search
- Wikidata
View/Edit Human	View/Edit Mouse

RNA-binding protein 6 is a protein that in humans is encoded by the RBM6 gene. RBM6 orthologs have been identified in all mammals for which complete genome data are available.

RBM6 splicing factor interacts with the DNA repair protein RAD51, and is also recruited to DNA double-strand breaks where it promotes homologous recombinational repair.
