= Napier Eland =

1950s British aircraft turboshaft engine

Eland
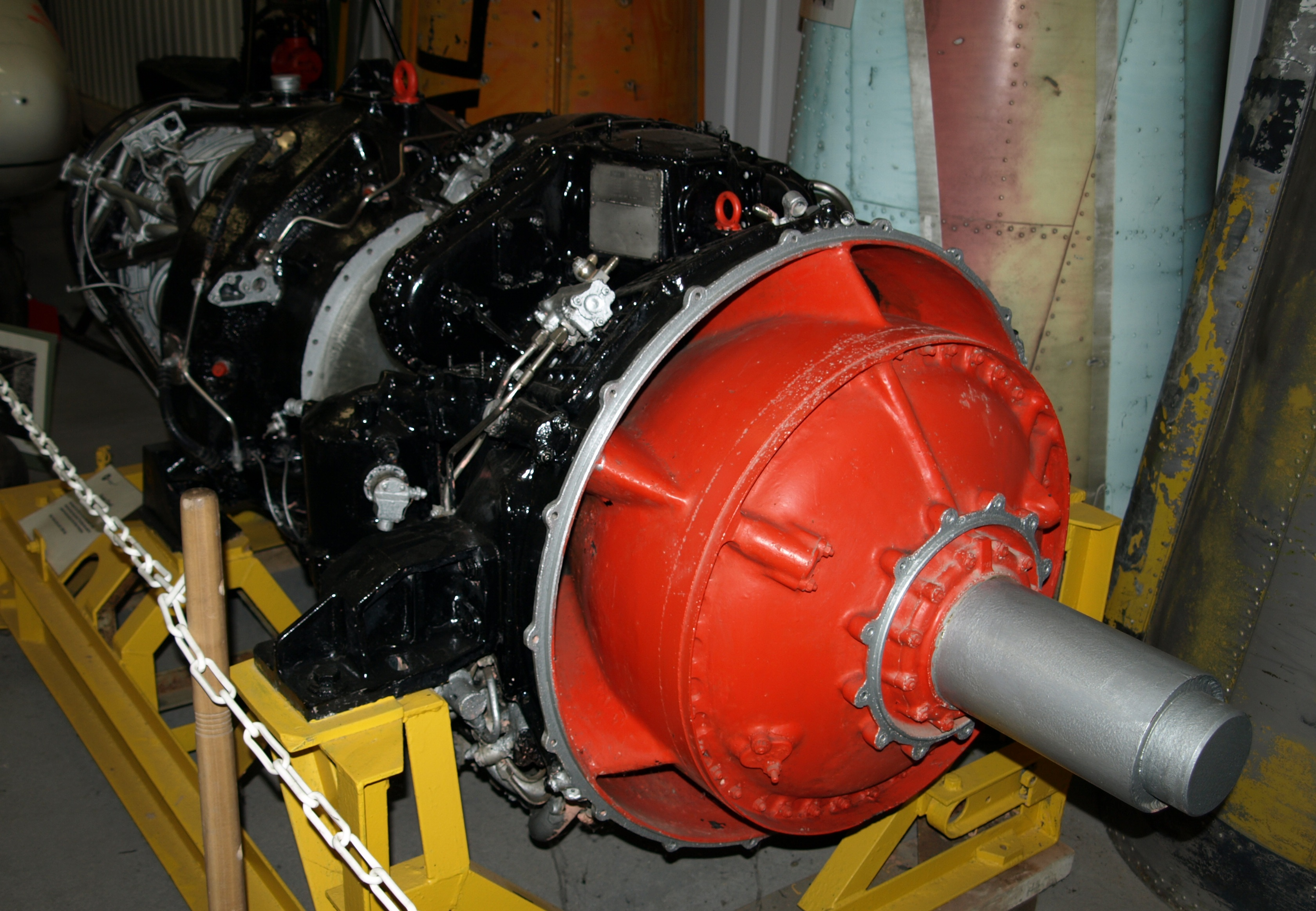
- Napier Eland on display at the Helicopter Museum (Weston).
- Type: Turboshaft/turboprop aero-engine
- Manufacturer: Napier & Son
- First run: 1953
- Major applications: Fairey Rotodyne; Convair CV-540

The Napier Eland is a British turboshaft or turboprop gas-turbine engine built by Napier & Son in the early 1950s. Production of the Eland ceased in 1961 when the Napier company was taken over by Rolls-Royce.

== Design and development ==
The Eland was first tested in flight in 1953 in a Vickers Varsity aircraft. Further flight proving was carried out from 1955 using the first production Airspeed Ambassador 2. The Eland was dropped from production when Napier was acquired by Rolls-Royce Limited in 1961.

The only production applications for the engine were two variants of the Convair CV-240 family, the Royal Canadian Air Force Canadair CC-109 Cosmopolitan and the civil Convair CV-540. The military and civil operators had perpetual trouble with the engines which were considered complex. Due to their unreliability The Department of Transport reduced the time between overhauls. The CC-106 had its Elands replaced with the Allison T56 turboprop and the CV540 was re-engined with the Pratt & Whitney R-2800 Double Wasp piston engine. Potential production applications which were subsequently cancelled were the Westland Westminster heavy-lift helicopter and the Fairey Rotodyne gyrodyne. The Rotodyne operated as an autogyro in forward flight using the Eland turboprops. For vertical flight the rotor was driven using an auxiliary compressor clutched to each Eland. They supplied compressed air to a combustion chamber at each rotor tip.

== Variants ==
Eland N.El.1
2,690 hp (2,010 kW) + 825 lbf (3.67 kN) residual thrust, static at sea level ICAN conditions.
Eland N.El.3
Powerplant for the Fairey Rotodyne driving the propeller and an auxiliary compressor to feed the rotor tip jets 2,805 hp (2,092 kW) + 500 lbf (2.22 kN) residual thrust, static at sea level ICAN conditions.
Eland N.El.4
3,765 hp (2,808 kW) + 610 lbf (2.71 kN) residual thrust, static at sea level ICAN conditions.
Eland N.El.6
Eland N.El.7
The 504 adapted to helicopter / convertiplane, compressed air generator use.
Eland E.211
The 504 adapted for mechanically driven helicopter rotors.
Eland 504
(N.El.6)
Eland 508
504 with increased max continuous rating.

== Applications ==
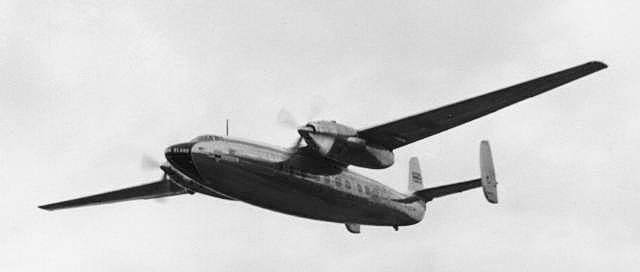
Napier's Eland testbed Airspeed Ambassador at Farnborough SBAC Show 1955

=== Turboshaft ===
- Westland Westminster

=== Turboprop ===
- Airspeed Ambassador
- Canadair CC-109 Cosmopolitan (CL-66)
- Convair CV-540
- Fairey Rotodyne
- Vickers Varsity (one aircraft as an engine test bed in 1954)

== Engines on display ==
A turboshaft Eland is on display at the Helicopter Museum, Weston-super-Mare.

== Specifications (Eland N.El.6) ==
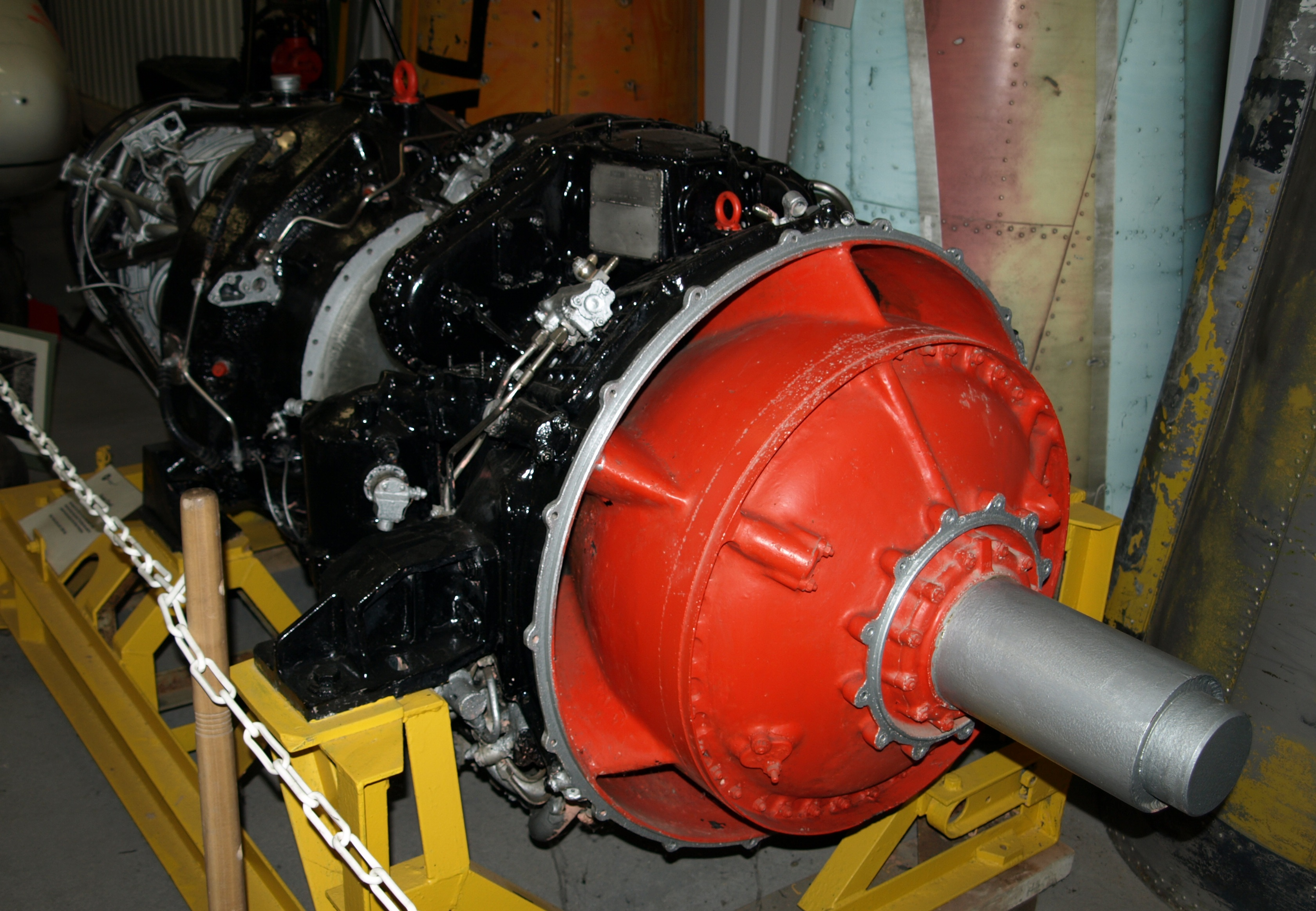
The Eland has a single shaft so the silver-coloured output shaft is connected to the compressor using gears inside the red-painted gearbox. The gears reduce the compressor speed to that required for a propeller of diameter 12 to 16 feet. For a helicopter application the output shaft goes into the helicopter gearbox for further speed reduction required by a large diameter rotor, 72 feet for the Westminster.

Data from Flight 29 August 1958 p.340

==== General characteristics ====
- Type: Single-shaft turboprop
- Length: 120 in (3,000 mm)
- Diameter: 36 in (910 mm)
- Dry weight: 1,735 lb (787 kg)

==== Components ====
- Compressor: 10-stage axial flow
- Combustors: 6 chambers
- Turbine: 3-stage
- Fuel type: Jet fuel

==== Performance ====
- Maximum power output: 3,500 hp (2,600 kW) (eshp - equivalent shaft horse-power - adding power from residual thrust)
- Overall pressure ratio: 7:1
- Air mass flow: 31 lb/s (14 kg/s)
- Specific fuel consumption: 0.595 lb/h (eshp)
- Thrust-to-weight ratio: 2.0 eshp/lb (3.3 kW/kg)

== See also ==
Comparable engines

- Allison T56
- Bristol Proteus
- Ivchenko AI-20
- Lycoming T55
- Rolls-Royce Tyne

Related lists

- List of aircraft engines
