= RBM5 =

Protein-coding gene in the species Homo sapiens

Identifiers
- Aliases: RBM5, G15, LUCA15, RMB5, H37, RNA binding motif protein 5, LUCA-15
- External IDs: OMIM: 606884; MGI: 1933204; GeneCards: RBM5
Available structures
PDB	Ortholog search: PDBe RCSB
PDB	List of PDB id codes 2LK0, 2LK1, 2LKZ

Gene location (Human)
Chr.	Chromosome 3 (human)
Band	3p21.31	Start	50,088,919 bp
Band	3p21.31	End	50,119,021 bp

Gene location (Mouse)
Chr.	Chromosome 9 (mouse)
Band	9|9 F1	Start	107,617,570 bp
Band	9|9 F1	End	107,648,195 bp
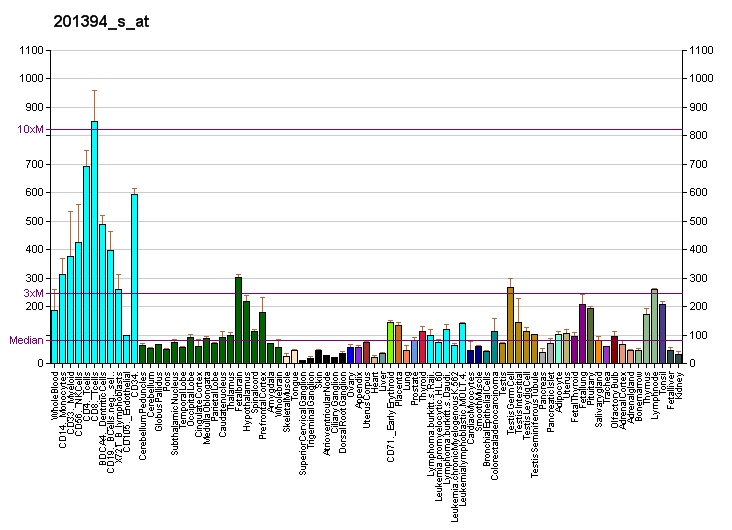

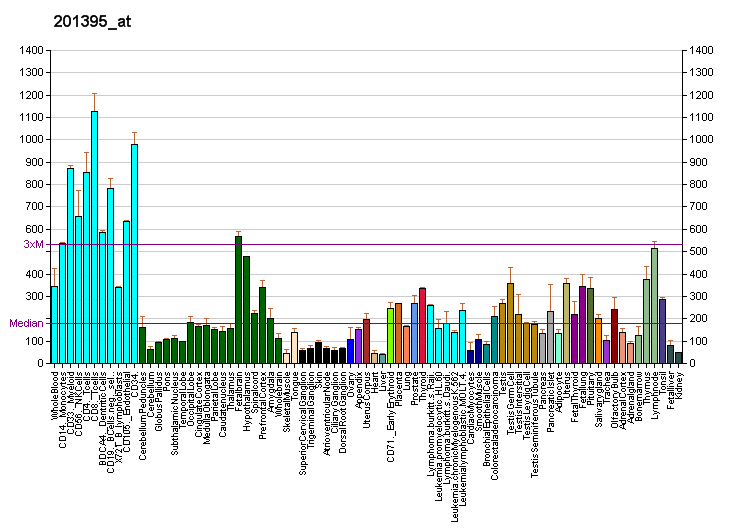
RNA expression pattern
Bgee	Human / Mouse (ortholog); Top expressed in: right uterine tube; sural nerve; Achilles tendon; left ovary; right ovary; right lobe of thyroid gland; canal of the cervix; left lobe of thyroid gland; right hemisphere of cerebellum; anterior pituitary / Top expressed in: Rostral migratory stream; genital tubercle; medullary collecting duct; tail of embryo; saccule; neural layer of retina; vestibular sensory epithelium; thymus; vestibular membrane of cochlear duct; lymph node; More reference expression data
BioGPS	More reference expression data
Gene ontology
Molecular function	DNA binding; metal ion binding; protein binding; nucleic acid binding; mRNA binding; RNA binding
Cellular component	nucleoplasm; spliceosomal complex; nucleus
Biological process	regulation of apoptotic process; mRNA splicing, via spliceosome; RNA processing; mRNA processing; regulation of alternative mRNA splicing, via spliceosome; spliceosomal complex assembly; positive regulation of apoptotic process; negative regulation of cell population proliferation; apoptotic process; RNA splicing
Sources:Amigo / QuickGO
Orthologs
Databases	NCBI: entry; OMA: entry
Species	Human	Mouse
Entrez	10181	83486
Ensembl	ENSG00000003756	ENSMUSG00000032580
UniProt	P52756	Q91YE7
RefSeq (mRNA)	NM_005778	NM_148930; NM_001359524; NM_001359525; NM_001359526
RefSeq (protein)	NP_005769	NP_683732; NP_001346453; NP_001346454; NP_001346455
Location (UCSC)	Chr 3: 50.09 – 50.12 Mb	Chr 9: 107.62 – 107.65 Mb
PubMed search
- Wikidata
View/Edit Human	View/Edit Mouse

RNA-binding protein 5 is a protein that in humans is encoded by the RBM5 gene.
