= List of accidents and incidents involving military aircraft (1950–1954) =

This is a list of accidents and incidents involving military aircraft grouped by the year in which the accident or incident occurred. Not all of the aircraft were in operation at the time. Combat losses are not included except for a very few cases denoted by singular circumstances.

== Aircraft terminology ==
Information on aircraft gives the type, and if available, the serial number of the operator in italics, the constructors number, also known as the manufacturer's serial number (c/n), exterior codes in apostrophes, nicknames (if any) in quotation marks, flight callsign in italics, and operating units.

== 1950 ==
1950
First of only two prototypes of the Fairchild XNQ-1 Navy trainer contender, BuNo 75725, written off in a crash.

5 January
A Boeing B-50A Superfortress, 46-021, c/n 15741 of the 3200th Proof Test Group out of Eglin AFB, crash lands in the Choctawhatchee Bay, northwest Florida, killing two of the 11 crew. Nine escape from the downed aircraft following the forced landing. The airframe settles in eight to ten feet of mud at a depth of 38 feet (12 m). Divers recover the body of flight engineer M/Sgt. Claude Dorman, 27, of Kingston, New Hampshire, from the nose of the bomber on Monday, 8 January. The body of S/Sgt. William Thomas Bell, 21, aerial photographer, who lived in Mayo, Florida, is recovered on Tuesday, 9 January, outside the plane from beneath the tail. The Eglin base public information officer identified the surviving crew as 1st Lt. Park R. Bidwell, instructor pilot; 1st Lt. Vere Short, pilot; 1st Lt. James S. Wigg, co-pilot; Maj. William C. McLaughlin, bombardier; and S/Sgt. Clifford J. Gallipo, M/Sgt. Alton Howard, M/Sgt. William J. Almand, T/Sgt. Samuel G. Broke, and Cpl. William F. Fitzpatrick, crewmen.

13 January
A Waco G-15A assault glider, 45-5548, of the 44085th (?) ABS, 14th Air Force, piloted by 2d Lt. Robert D. Henley, of Columbia, Missouri, crash lands on Friday the 13th at Lawson Air Force Base, Georgia, on the Fort Benning reservation, resulting in fatalities to all 13 on board. Two G-15As had been released by a Fairchild C-82 towplane and were sloping in for what appeared to be a normal landing when one tipped sideways and smashed into the ground with a "tremendous roar" that spread wreckage over 700 feet (210 m) of the runway. An enlisted man who witnessed the accident, stated that "bodies spilled out in every direction." Two Air Force officers and eleven paratroop students of Company A, Airborne Battalion, died in the accident. The paratroopers were scheduled to "graduate" on 14 January. "First reports said a sudden, strong wind current caused a wing to rip into the ground. But officers later said they did not know the cause." An observer in the control tower said that it happened so quickly that when he took his eyes from the apparently normal glider for a split-second he missed the crash. "Two gliders were coming in for a normal landing approach," said Cpl. James P. Harr of Detroit. "Everything appeared normal, so I turned to look at the C-82 that had released them. Then I turned back to look at the gliders and saw a pile of debris out there. What I thought was debris turned out to be bodies." The other glider landed safely. The Air Force identified twelve of the victims as: 2d Lt. Robert D. Henley, pilot; Sgt. 1/c Eugene S. Jones, 25, instructor, Clay, West Virginia; Sgt. Frank C. Rathberger, 23, Portland, Oregon; Pvt. Alfonso Romero, 18, Berkeley, California; Pvt. Alvin F. Runnell, 19, Creekside, Pennsylvania; Pvt. Gordon A. Smith, 23, Columbus, Georgia; Pvt. Robert Snell Jr., 18, Nashville, Tennessee; Pvt. James H. Stacey, 23, St. Helen's, Lee County, Kentucky; Pvt. Rodney R. Toeppel, 18, Wisconsin Rapids, Wisconsin; Pvt. Norman H. Vlands, 18, Holly Oak, Delaware; Pvt. Townsend E. Tomlinson, 19, Dover, Delaware; and Pvt. Richard L. Wedeikis, 18, of Kenosha, Wisconsin. The name of the second pilot was withheld. Air Force officials at Smyrna Air Force Base, near Nashville, Tennessee, which has jurisdiction over training flights at Fort Benning, began a full investigation into the cause of the accident. These were the first glider fatalities at Fort Benning since 1946.

26 January

A Douglas C-54D Skymaster, 42-72469, of the Second Strategic Support Squadron, 97th Bomb Wing, Strategic Air Command, out of Biggs AFB, Texas, departs Elmendorf Air Force Base, Alaska, for Great Falls Air Force Base, Montana, with a crew of 8 and 36 passengers (34 service personnel and 2 civilians). Two hours into a planned eight-and-a-half-hour flight, at 1709 hrs., it makes its last contact by radio and has been missing since. Despite a massive air and ground search at the time and repeated searches since 1950, as of 19 June 2011 no trace of the aircraft or its occupants has been found, nor has the cause of the aircraft's disappearance been determined.

11 February
Twin-engine Beechcraft D-18 cargo air service aircraft flying from Dayton, Ohio, to Albuquerque, New Mexico, crashed four miles (6 km) west of West Mesa Airport with a pilot and two AEC security guards aboard. Plane was making an approach to a landing strip when it encountered a cloud and broke off the approach. While circling around the mesa atop which the airstrip was located, it hit a steep slope in an upright position. Completely demolished by the ensuing impact and fire, killing all three men aboard, the classified cargo of 792 HE detonator units in 22 boxes was destroyed – salvaged from the wreckage. As there was no evidence of sabotage, and since none of the detonators appeared to be missing, the incident was not reported to the Federal Bureau of Investigation.

13 February

A U.S. Air Force Convair B-36B Peacemaker, 44-92075, of the 436th Bomb Squadron, 7th Bomb Wing, in transit from Eielson AFB, Alaska to Carswell AFB, Texas, loses three of six engines, suffers icing. To lighten aircraft, crew jettisons Mark 4 nuclear bomb casing over the Pacific Ocean from 8,000 feet (2,400 m). High explosives detonate on contact, large shockwave seen, 17 crew later bail out safely over Princess Royal Island, but five (the first to depart the bomber) are not recovered and are assumed to have come down in water and drowned. Aircraft flies 210 miles (340 km) with no crew, impacting in the Skeena Mountains at 6,000 feet (1,800 m), east of Stewart, British Columbia. Wreckage found in September 1953.

15 February
de Havilland DH 108, VW120, flown by RAE's OC, Squadron Leader J. Stewart R. Muller-Rowland, enters steep dive from 27,000 feet (8,200 m), breaking up around 10,000 feet (3,000 m) with fatal result. The main wreckage comes down at Little Brickhill, near Bletchley. The pilot's body was found near Sandy Lane near Woburn Sands also near Bletchley.

22 February
On its 102nd flight, the USAF Northrop XF-89 Scorpion, 46–678, crashed on Rosecrans Avenue, the boundary line of the cities of El Segundo and Manhattan Beach, after making a high-speed low pass for Air Force officials at Hawthorne Airport (Northrop Field). Right horizontal stabilizer peeled off, aircraft disintegrated, throwing pilot Charles Tucker clear, parachuted safely, but flight engineer Arthur Turton died in mishap. Aircraft impacted five miles (8 km) from factory, setting alight a Standard Oil below-ground storage tank. Cause was found to be high-frequency, low-amplitude aeroelastic flutter of both the vertical and horizontal stabilizers.

7 March
During a practice dive-bombing attack, Hawker Sea Fury FB.11, VX651, coded '132', of 736 Naval Air Squadron, loses part of lower engine cowling which strikes wing. Pilot returns to HMS Illustrious but misjudges landing, missing all arrestor wires, hits crash barrier, tearing engine loose, airframe overturns, burns. Pilot okay, but Sea Fury written off.

15 March
Avro Lincoln B Mk.2, RF511, of No.230 Operational Conversion Unit, crashes on Carnedd Llewelyn near Bethesda, Wales.

15 March
First Northrop YB-49, 42-102367, is wrecked this date during a high-speed taxi accident at Edwards Air Force Base, California. Outfitted with additional flight performance measuring instruments after the loss of the second YB-49 on 5 June 1948, the first YB-49 (converted from the second YB-35), being operated by an Air Force crew, piloted by Major Russell E. Schleeh, (1919–2012) engaged in testing the stabilizer response during a high-speed taxi run, experiences a violent nose wheel shimmy. Before the aircraft can be brought under control, the nose gear collapses and the airframe breaks in two, destroying it. Pilot suffers a broken back, and the flight engineer a broken wrist. Reclamation authorized by Northrop, for Air Materiel Command, 28 June 1950.

15 March
North American F-51D Mustang, 44-74896, flown by Lt. Edwin F. Gutt, strikes a building after landing at Las Vegas Air Force Base, Nevada, heavily damaging the airframe.

16 March
Two F-84s being ferried to Greater Pittsburgh Airport in Pennsylvania were cruising at 33,000 feet (10,000 m) when they ran out of fuel simultaneously. They were forced down in the rugged hills of Greene County, Pennsylvania, near the town of Spragg. Each pilot crash landed on a different narrow, twisting two-lane highway, narrowly missing automobile traffic and several houses as they came in. Both aircraft were destroyed, but each pilot walked away from his aircraft with minor injuries.

17 March
First Mikoyan-Gurevich I-330 SI, prototype for the Mikoyan-Gurevich MiG-17, crashes this date. First flown 14 January 1950, piloted by Ivan Ivashchenko, he is killed when the aircraft develops flutter which tears off his horizontal tail, causing a spin and crash. Lack of wing stiffness also resulted in aileron reversal, which was discovered and fixed.

22 March
Fuerza Aérea Argentina Avro Lincoln B.Mk. II, B-019, lost in storm over Tierra del Fuego, eleven killed. Wreckage finally found on a glacier on the Chilean side of Tierra del Fuego in 1983.

22 March
Two North American F-86A Sabre fighter jets attached to the 93d Fighter-Interceptor Squadron, 81st Fighter-Interceptor Group, at Kirtland AFB, New Mexico, crash in Emmons, West Virginia, just outside Charleston. They had landed in Charleston the previous day due to low fuel on a cross-country flight. After fuel was delivered from Wright-Patterson AFB, Dayton, Ohio, the pilots, Lt. Col. A. F. Reinhardt, 43, and Capt. George Evans, 28, took off this date in morning marginal weather with low clouds and rain. A few minutes later, both aircraft nose-dived into the side yard of local landowner. Both pilots KWF. F-86A 48–306, and F-86A 49-1019, took off in parallel from Kanawha Airport and had an apparent mid-air collision.

26 March
RAF Short S.25 Sunderland GR.5, SZ513, sank at RAF Seletar after a bomb explosion while being prepared for a sortie, two killed.

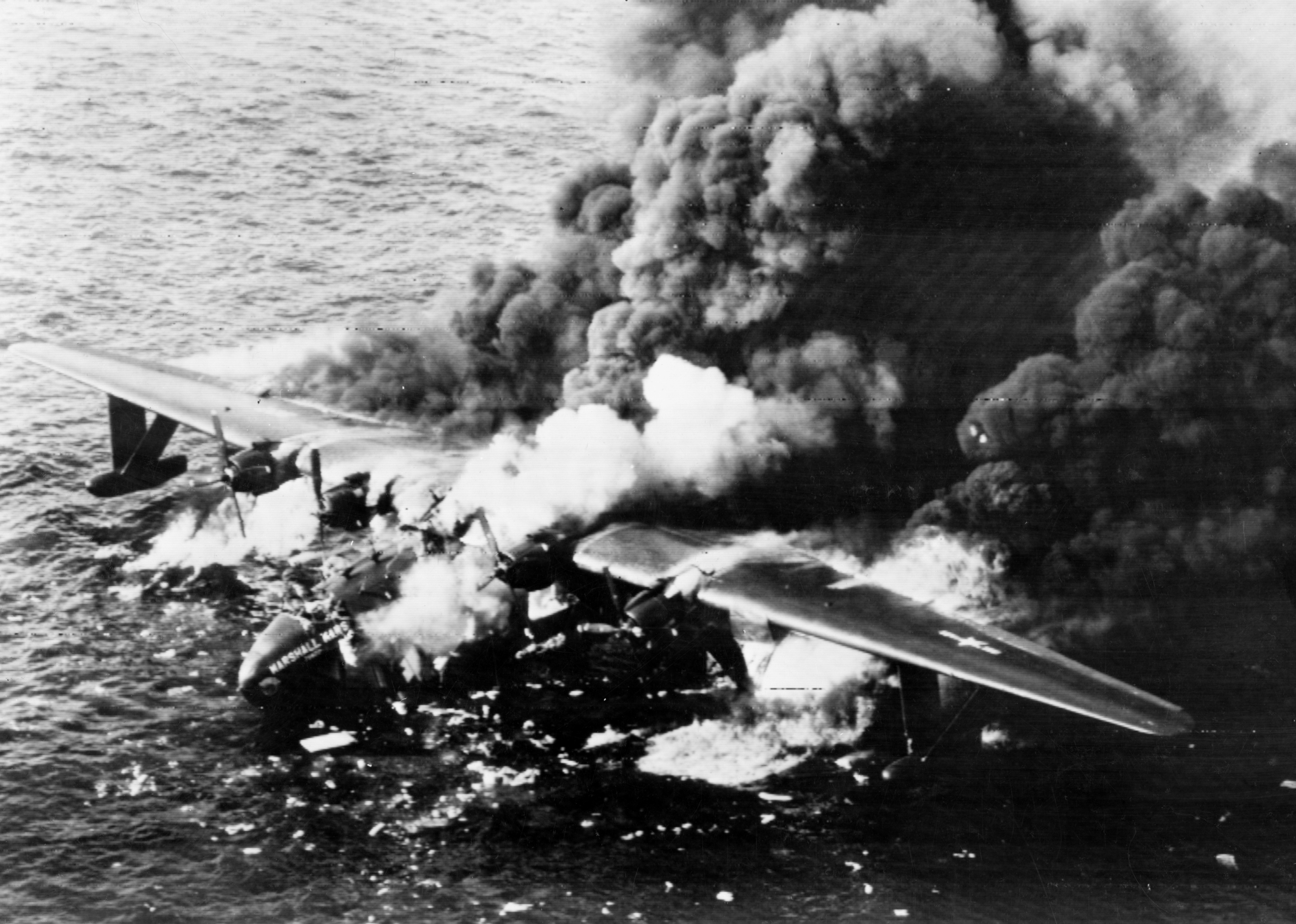
JRM-3 Marshall Mars burning near Honolulu, Hawaii

5 April
Martin JRM-3 Mars flying boat, BuNo 76822 named "Marshall Mars", destroyed by fire near Honolulu, Hawaiian Islands – force landed in Keehi Lagoon, Oahu, with engine fire. Crew were rescued after which aircraft exploded. Although an order for 20 was placed by the Navy, with the end of the war, this was reduced to the five already in production.

7 April
Sole prototype, Nord NC 1080 single-engine naval fighter, F-WFKZ, first flown 29 July 1949, is completely destroyed in a flight accident. Pilot Pierre Gallay dies in the accident. Cause is never determined, and the project is abandoned.

11 April
A USAF Boeing B-29-50-MO Superfortress, 44-86329, of the 830th Bomb Squadron, 509th Bomb Wing (M), on a routine flight, crashes into mountain on Manzano Base Nuclear Weapons Storage Area (WSA), three minutes after take-off from Kirtland AFB, New Mexico, killing 13 crew. One fully assembled bomb casing (probably a Mark 4 nuclear bomb) on board is completely shattered when triggers explode. A fissile pit, carried separately, was recovered.

23 April
Prototype SNCASO 4000, France's first jet bomber design, F-WBBL, rolled out 5 March 1950, suffers undercarriage collapse during taxiing trials causing extensive damage. Complex gear design proves too fragile for aircraft weight. With repairs and strengthened gear, the bomber makes its first and only flight on 15 March 1951 but design is found to be underpowered and unstable and never again takes to the air.

1 May
Third and final de Havilland DH 108, TG283, crashes near Hartley Wintney, Hants, during stall tests, kills replacement RAE OC, Squadron Leader George Genders. Aircraft entered uncontrollable spin, pilot bails out, parachute fails.

11 May
Lockheed XP2V-1 Neptune, BuNo. 48238, second P2V prototype, written off this date near Oyster, Virginia, during flight test out of NAS Patuxent River, Maryland, when engine fell off.

12 May
After the United States Air Force gives Convair a contract to install an Allison J33-A-29 jet engine with afterburner in place of the Allison J33-A-23 in the Convair XF-92A, 46-0682, test pilot Chuck Yeager attempts ferry flight from Edwards AFB, California to the Convair plant at San Diego but engine fails immediately after takeoff, forcing an emergency landing on the dry lakebed. Airframe is subsequently trucked to San Diego.

23 May
While flying Supermarine Attacker F.1, WA469, to test airbrakes, Supermarine pilot Leslie R. Colquhoun makes a high-speed run over South Marston airfield, experiences a sudden nose-down pitch as the starboard wingtip folds upwards. Using only the rudder – the ailerons had jammed – he makes a wide circuit and touches down at ~200 knots (370 km/h), coming to a stop just short of the end of the runway with a burst tyre. He receives the George Medal for saving the aircraft under daunting circumstances.

25 May
First prototype of Arsenal VG 90 turbojet strike fighter design for the Aéronavale, VG-90.01, F-WFOE, first flown 27 September 1949, crashes this date killing the pilot Pierre Decroo.

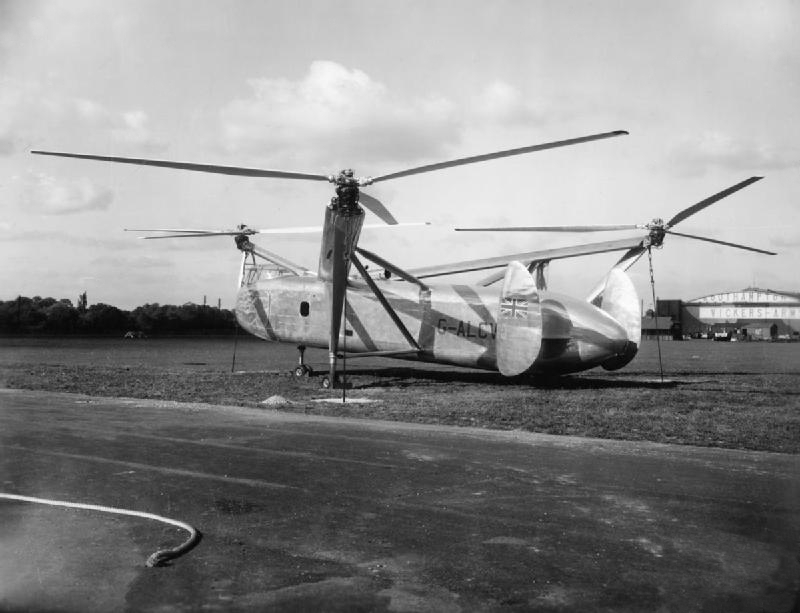
The example of the Cierva Air Horse lost on 13 June 1950.

13 June
First of two RAF Cierva W.11 Air Horse helicopters, VZ724, G-ALCV, (at the time, the largest helicopter type flown), breaks up in flight and crashes due to fatigue failure of a swashplate carrier driving link in the front rotor hub, killing all three crew: Ministry of Supply chief helicopter test pilot Squadron Leader F. J. "Jeep" Cable, Cierva's Chief Test Pilot Alan Marsh and flight test engineer Joseph K. Unsworth.

16 June
The McDonnell XF-88A Voodoo, 46–526, piloted by Gen. Frank K. Everest, is damaged in a belly landing after engine failure at Edwards AFB, California, this date. The XF-88A will eventually be sent to the Langley Aeronautical Laboratory to serve as a spares source in 1955 in support of flight testing of the XF-88B, 46–525, through 1956, after which both airframes are scrapped. Another source gives the date for the landing mishap as 9 November 1949, and states that the airframe was trucked to St. Louis for repairs.

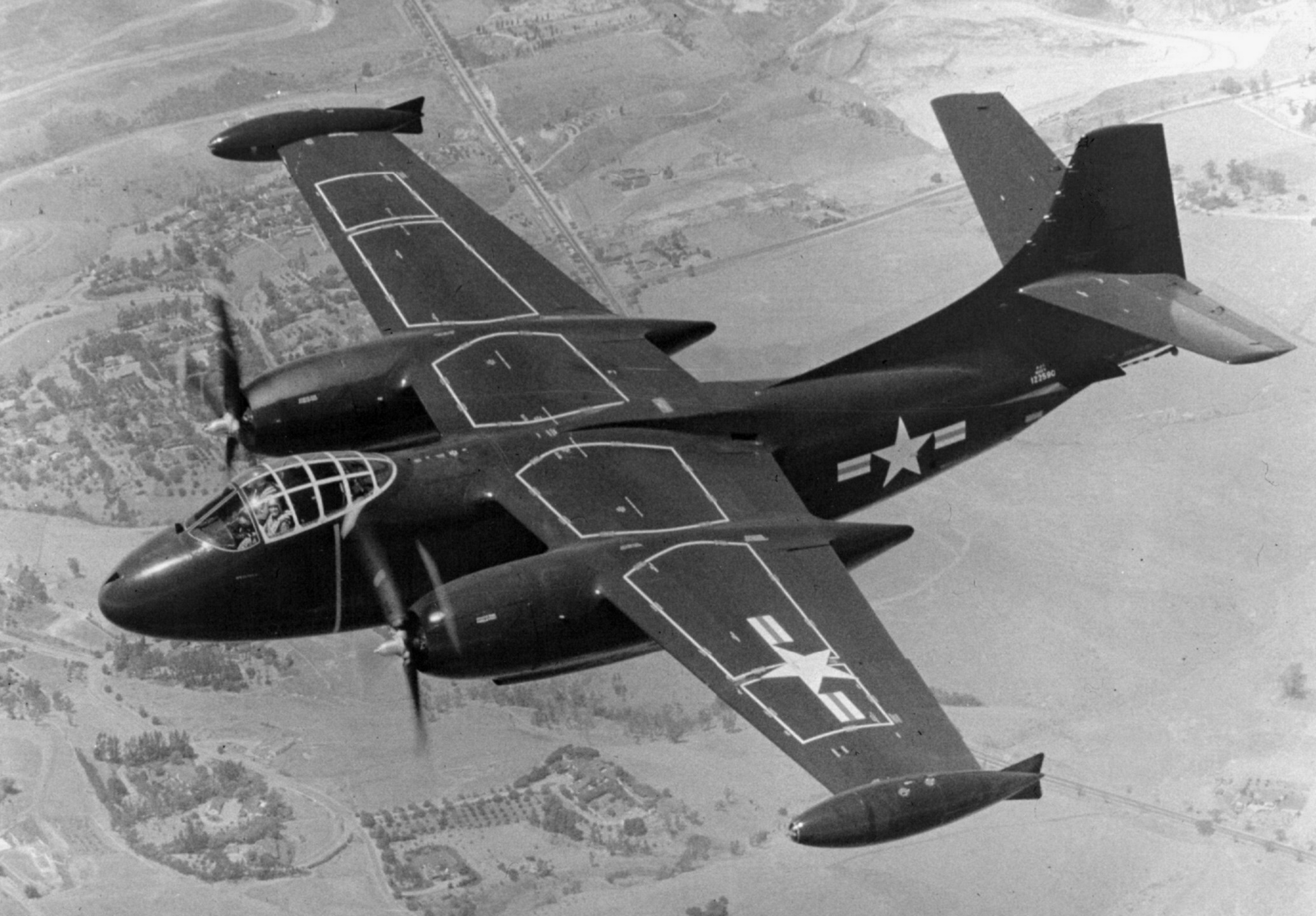
The first production AJ-1 Savage over Southern California in 1950, lost near Bedford, Virginia, on 22 June 1950.

22 June
The first production North American AJ-1 Savage, BuNo 122590, c/n 156-38465, crashes and burns at ~2030 hours ET at Huddleston, Virginia, in Bedford County, whilst on a ferry flight from Edwards AFB, California, to NAS Patuxent River, Maryland. Lt. Cmdr. Willard Sampson, USN, and civilians Holiday Lee Turner of the Navy Bureau of Aeronautics, and James A. Moore Jr., an employee of North American Aviation, are KWF. On a hot sticky summer night, with no air conditioning, Larry Lynch, then 12 years old, and his family were sitting on the porch when "they heard a plane approaching from the west. 'It made a strange noise and then there was a loud pop,' said Lynch of Bedford. 'It was also cloudy, so you didn't see all of it until it broke through the clouds pretty low.' The plane was in a dive. Lynch recalls hearing the plane crash moments later about two miles from his family's home on the J. A. Laughlin farm in Huddleston. 'There was a neighbor, and my dad and I got in the truck and went over to the crash site,' recalled Lynch. 'There were probably less than 10 vehicles when we got there.' Hundreds of other cars would follow in the hour before the sheriff's department and fire department arrived. The drivers turned their cars so the headlights shone on the scene. The crash sight was on fire and the stench of gasoline filled the air. Lynch remembers seeing plane and body parts strewn across the field. 'It was a pretty gruesome sight,' he said. 'I was 12 years old and it made a very big impression on me.'" In 2002, a permanent memorial was erected near the crash site at Glenwood Sunoco, 2074 Smith Mountain Lake Parkway in Huddleston, to the three men who died. "The memorial was the brainchild of Jeffrey Clemens, then pastor of New Prospect Church in Bedford. A former Army pastor, he was interested in erecting memorials at the sites of five military plane crashes that killed 13 men in Bedford County from 1943 to 1950. The community came together for the task, raising money and arranging dedication ceremonies. Richard McGann, president of McGann Masonry in Lynchburg built the markers. At the Huddleston crash site, an 868-pound (394 kg) granite marker was dedicated on 10 November 2002.

30 June
Royal Canadian Navy Lt. Mervin C. “Butch” Hare of the 803 Naval Fighter Squadron departs from Montreal, Quebec, in Hawker Sea Fury FB.11, TF997, but fails to arrive at home base of HMCS Shearwater, Dartmouth, Nova Scotia. Despite a massive international air search, nothing is found. In February 1968, two foresters discovered the wreckage in a remote area of Maine. The Sea Fury had struck a tree on top of the ridge with its port wing root and struck the ground within about 150 feet (46 m). The force of the impact dug a 15-foot (4.6 m) diameter crater and the aircraft broke up and scattered, within a 50-yard (46 m) radius. There had been several small fires. Lt. Hare's parachute harness pieces were later found near the crater, ending an initial speculation that he had bailed out and perished elsewhere in the Maine woods.

6 July
Third prototype of three Vought XF7U-1 Cutlass twin-tailed fighters, BuNo 122474, suffers engine explosion during flight exhibition at NAS Patuxent River, Maryland. Vought test pilot Paul Thayer ejects, parachutes into 2 feet (0.61 m) of water, airframe impacts in dense woods on Drum Point island in the Patuxent River. An account in Naval Aviation News states that Thayer had made a couple of high-speed passes over the field and was at ~15,000 feet (4,600 m) when he had a flameout. Unable to get a relight, he attempts to roll the fighter inverted and unfastens his belt to drop out of the cockpit. Unable to get the jet to roll, he ejects at ~2,000 feet (610 m), believed to be the first ejection in which the pilot was not securely belted into the seat. Pilot is returned safely to the admiral's reviewing stand, show announcer inquires "What will you do for an encore Mr. Thayer?" He learns that he suffered fracture to small bone at base of spine – later tells Vought management that he was the only manager who actually "broke his ass for the Company."

13 July
A USAF Boeing B-50D Superfortress, 49–267, of the 97th Bomb Wing out of Biggs AFB, Texas, carrying a nuclear weapon bomb casing (but no fissile pit), stalls at 7,000 feet (2,100 m) at about 1454 hrs. EST, crashes between Lebanon and Mason, Ohio, killing four officers and twelve airmen. No radio communication was received before the crash, and although all crew wore parachutes, none bailed out. HE in bomb casing explodes on impact leaving crater 200X25 feet, explosion heard for 25 miles (40 km). One account states that the weather was clear, but Joe Baugher reports that bomber was in a storm system.

28 July
Royal Navy Supermarine Seafire F.47 VP473 of 800 Naval Air Squadron operating from HMS Triumph, is shot down over Korean waters by a USAF Boeing B-29 Superfortress. Pilot is rescued by an American destroyer.

5 August

A USAF Boeing B-29 Superfortress, 44-87651, of the 99th Bomb Squadron, 9th Bomb Group, 9th Bomb Wing, carrying a Mark 4 nuclear bomb, suffers runaway propellers and landing gear retraction problems during takeoff at Fairfield-Suisun Air Force Base, Fairfield, California; concerned that the aircraft cannot clear rising terrain ahead, aircraft and mission commander Brig. Gen. Robert F. Travis orders a return to the airfield. The pilot completes a 180-degree turn, but he and the copilot are subsequently unable to correct a descending turn to the left, and the B-29 crashes along the airfield perimeter at a speed of 120 mph (190 km/h) in a wing-low attitude, breaking apart and catching fire. After emergency personnel arrive at the scene, a huge explosion occurs, killing 7 on the ground and 12 aboard the plane, including Travis; the airfield is later renamed Travis Air Force Base in his honor. Numerous nearby mobile homes are severely damaged and dozens of civilians, firefighters, and USAF ground crew are injured. The USAF attributes the explosion to conventional 500-pound (230 kg) HE bombs aboard the B-29 and claims that the nuclear bomb's fissile pit was aboard a different aircraft, but admits that the bomb casing contained depleted uranium used as ballast, and later orders a public health assessment of the crash site. Investigators attribute the crash to improper maintenance and the USAF makes several changes to B-29 operating and maintenance procedures.

24 August
Two Douglas B-26 Invaders of the 729th Bombardment Squadron (Light), 452d Bombardment Group (Light), based at George AFB, California, collide in flight over El Mirage Dry Lake, 10 miles NW of Victorville, California. B-26B, 44-34174, piloted by Ouris H. Cuerton, and B-26B, 44-34677, piloted by Lyle N. Leavitt, both crash with crew fatalities during attempted bail-outs. The 729th/452d had been ordered to active service on 10 August 1950.

25 August
RAF Douglas Dakota C.4, KN630, of No. 52 Squadron crashes in dense jungle near Kampong Jenera during a target making and supply dropping mission, 12 dead. Nine Britons, along with three Malaysians on board, are killed when the Dakota crashes into a ravine near Kampung Jendera, in the Sungai Beluar valley in the communist-infested jungles of Gua Musang, Kelantan. The Britons who perished were identified as RAF crew pilot Lt Edward Robert Talbot, 27, from Dorchester; navigator Sgt Geoffrey Carpenter, 23, from West Norwood; and signaller Sgt Thomas O'Toole, 34, from Merthyr Tydfil. The Royal Army Service Corps air despatchers were Corporal Phillip Bryant, 25, from Southend-on-Sea; and Privates Peter Taylor, 20, from Bournemouth; Roy Wilson, 21, from Birkenhead and Oliver Goldsmith, 21, from Neston – all drivers. The passengers were army officer Major John Proctor and land development officer Anker Rentse. The Malaysians were police constable Mohammed Abdul Lalil Jalil, civilian Yaacob Mat and an Orang Asli guide, Saiap Alais Sherda, from the Sakai tribe. RAF records showed the plane, based in Changi, Singapore, had flown to Kota Baru with three crew and four despatchers. In Kota Baru, the aircraft picked up the five passengers and flew east of Kampung Jendera to drop a marker flare at a clearing for eight Lincoln bombers. "The aircraft made a second low-level pass to drop another marker flare when it is believed that it suffered engine trouble due to the adverse weather condition, making it unable to clear a ridge. It then rammed into trees and crashed into a ravine, killing all aboard. The crash happened when the country was struggling with communist insurgents, a period known as the Malayan Emergency (1948–60), when British, Commonwealth and other security forces in Malaya fought the insurgents. The Communist Party of Malaya had demanded Malaya's independence, but Britain responded by mounting a large-scale military and political counter-insurgency operation. Malaya finally won Independence on Aug 31, 1957." On 15 March 2012, the remains of the crew were reburied at the Commonwealth War Grave in Cheras with full military honours in the presence of both British and Malaysian Defence Ministry officials, and members of the Ex-British Army Association of Malaysia.

9 September
A Douglas R5D-3 crashed shortly after take off from Kwajalein atoll in the South Pacific Ocean en route to Tokyo, Japan. 26 U.S. Navy personnel were killed, including 11 nurses. Navy R5D-3, BuNo 56496, c/n 10624, was the airframe involved.

13 September
A F-86 Sabre Jet #49-1203 crashed near Highmarket, close to Griffiss Air Force Base in Rome, New York, USA. The pilot was on a training mission in preparation to go to Korea and was killed. George H Helbing : Second Lieutenant from Iowa, Korean War Casualty

19 September
A U.S. Navy C-54 en route to Korea crashed into the sea approximately one minute after takeoff from Kwajalein Atoll, Marshall Islands. The aircraft had 26 personnel aboard including eleven nurses. There were no survivors.

26 September
USAF Douglas C-54D-1-DC Skymaster medical aircraft, 42-72457, c/n 10562, of the 6th Troop Carrier Squadron, 374th Troop Carrier Wing, from Tachikawa Air Base, Japan, crashes in the Korea Strait, one mile from the end of the runway after taking off from Ashiya Air Base, Kyushu, killing 23 of 51 on board.

27 September
An Argentine Air Force Vickers VC.1 Viking, T-8, was burnt out in a hangar fire at El Palomar, Argentina.

29 September
Landing aboard USS Philippine Sea, which was operating as flagship of Task Force 77 in Korean waters, Grumman F9F-2 Panther, BuNo 123432, of VF-111, crashes through all barriers and hits eleven parked aircraft.

27 October
North American AJ-1 Savage, BuNo 124163, of VC-5, fails to climb out on launch from the USS Franklin D. Roosevelt, and goes into the water directly off the bow, reportedly off of Guantanamo Bay, Cuba. The Plane Commander was LCDR Dave Purdon, the B/N was LTJG Ed Decker, and the Third Crewman was Chief Edward R. Barrett. Only Decker escapes from the wreckage with minor injuries to be rescued by the plane guard helicopter. Cause was possibly accidental engagement of the flight control gust locks. Newsreel footage of this accident was released through Movietone News.

8 November
Boeing SB-17G Flying Fortress, 43-39364, of the 3d Air Rescue Squadron, is heavily damaged while parked when struck by SB-17G, 43-39365, of the same unit, at Ashiya Air Base, Japan, when its hydraulics failed. The noses of both are wrecked and both are written off.

9 November
Boeing RB-29A Superfortress, 44-61813, c/n 11290, built as a B-29A-50-MO, modified to F-13A, redesignated RB-29A, Circle X tailcode, of the 31st Strategic Reconnaissance Squadron, damaged by MiG-15s, during touch-down at Johnson Air Base, Japan, lands too hot and with too much nose-down attitude, overshoots runway, ends up in a cabbage patch, airframe breaks into five major portions. Small fire extinguished quickly but it is written off. Five crew died.

10 November

A USAF Boeing B-50 Superfortress of the 43d Bomb Wing on a routine weapons ferrying flight between Goose Bay, Labrador and its home base at Davis-Monthan AFB, Arizona, loses two of four engines. To maintain altitude it jettisons empty Mark 4 nuclear bomb casing just before 1600 hrs. at 10,500 feet (3,200 m) above the St. Lawrence River near the town of St. Alexandre-de-Kamouraska, about 90 miles (140 km) northeast of Quebec, Canada. HE in the casing observed detonating upon impact in the middle of the twelve-mile (19 km)-wide river, blast felt for 25 miles (40 km). Official Air Force explanation at the time is that the Superfortress released three conventional 500-pound (230 kg) HE bombs.

11 November
A Fairchild C-82A-FA Packet, 45-57739, c/n 10109, of the 375th Troop Carrier Wing (Medium), en route from Maxwell AFB, Alabama, and due to land at Greenville AFB, South Carolina, at 2230 hrs., crashes near Pickens, South Carolina, ~40 miles (64 km) W of the destination, shortly after 2200 hrs. this date. On approach to Greenville, the aircraft strikes Bully Mountain in northern Pickens County, killing three crew and one passenger. KWF are Capt. John Miles Stuckrath, pilot; 1st Lt. Robert P. Schmitt, co-pilot; and S/Sgt. John Davis Bloomer; all were attached to Greenville AFB and were part of a Pittsburgh reserve wing called to active duty on 15 October 1950. The passenger was S/Sgt. Walter O. Lott, of Pensacola, Florida. He was a member of a Maxwell AFB unit. "The plane apparently began to plunge after it sheared off tree tops. It cut a cyclonic gap through the immense trees for about 100 yards and plowed into the 2,500-foot mountain near its peak. The impact of the crash sent one motor hurling 800 feet down one side of the mountain, and the other motor landed 500 feet down the opposite side." A post-crash fire burned two acres of forest land. The aircraft had just been overhauled at McChord Air Force Base, Washington, and had refueled at Maxwell AFB before transiting to its new assignment at Greenville AFB.

22 November
First official test flight of the U.S. Navy Vought XSSM-N-8 Regulus, FTV-1, (Flight Test Vehicle), '1', from Rogers Dry Lake, Edwards AFB, California, goes badly when, after reaching an altitude of several hundred feet after lift-off, the J33 jet-powered missile rolls violently right and crashes. Had it rolled to the left, it would likely have struck the USN Lockheed TV-2 Seastar chaseplane piloted by Chuck Miller with Roy Pearson on board as missile controller. Cause is found to be a broken brass pin in the port elevator pump assembly that allowed the elevator to deploy, the pin having been worn out during months of ground test runs. Brass is subsequently replaced by steel pins, and problem is solved.

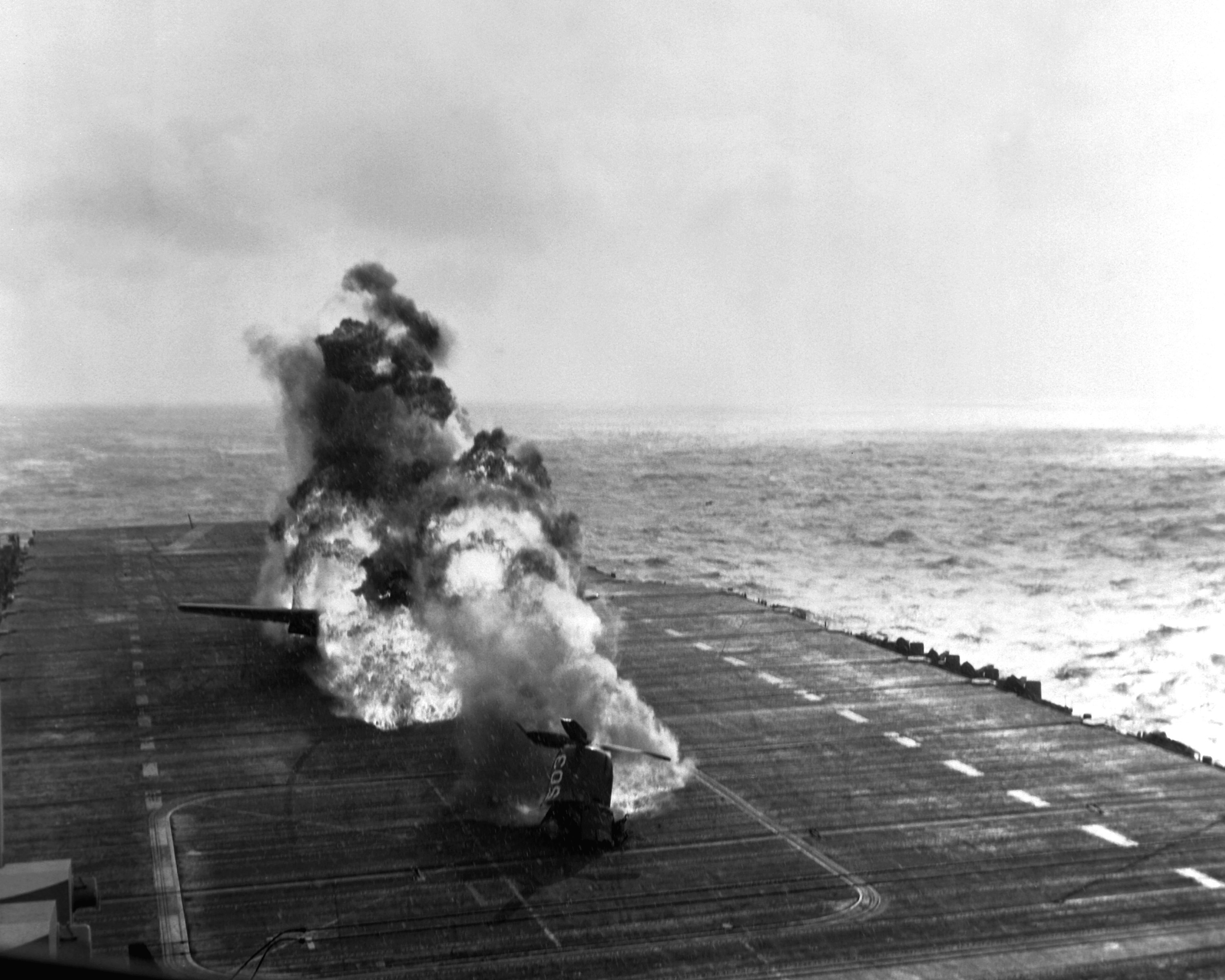
An AD-4 Skyraider of VA-115 crashes aboard USS Philippine Sea (CV-47).

12 December
A U.S. Navy Douglas AD-4 Skyraider of Attack Squadron 115 "Arabs", Carrier Air Group 11 (CVG-11), bursts into flame as the engine breaks off upon landing aboard the U.S. aircraft carrier USS Philippine Sea (CV-47). The Skyraider had been hit by enemy flak over Korea.

19 December
First prototype Douglas XA2D-1 Skyshark, BuNo 122988, c/n 7045, crashes at Edwards AFB, California, on its 15th flight. Taken up by Navy Lt. Cdr. Hugh Wood for dive tests, the first was initiated from 30,000 feet (9,100 m). During the 5 g pullout from the second dive, begun at 20,000 feet (6,100 m), vapor begins trailing from the airframe, soon enveloping it, but stops when the ventral dive brakes are retracted. While turning back for a visual inspection from the ground, the XA2D begins losing altitude rapidly. Pilot attempts to land on the dry lakebed but is unable to flare properly and the dive angle is too steep. With the undercarriage in the down position, the airframe strikes the ground at high speed at a 30-degree angle, shearing off the gear, the prototype then sliding several hundred yards before burning, killing the pilot. Investigation finds that the starboard power section of the coupled Allison XT40A turboprop engine had failed and did not declutch, allowing the Skyshark to fly on the power of the opposite section, nor did the propellers feather. As the wings' lift disappeared, a fatal sink rate was induced. Additional instrumentation and an automatic decoupler are added to the second prototype, but by the time it is ready to fly on 3 April 1952, sixteen months have passed, and with all-jet designs being developed, the A2D program is essentially dead. Total flight time on the lost airframe was barely 20 hours.

23 December
U.S. Navy Lockheed P2V-3W Neptune, BuNo 124357, of VP-931, NAS Whidbey Island, crashes on McCreight Mountain, Vancouver Island, British Columbia. Wreckage found 21 September 1961, according to Joe Baugher. Pilot Lt. Lalonde M. Pinne and ten crew KWF. Another source cites crash date of 18 December 1950. Yet another source lists discovery date as 21 October 1951, found by a Canadian aircraft that was off-course.

== 1951 ==
10 January
Boeing B-50D-80-BO Superfortress, 48-0070, c/n 15879, of the Headquarters Squadron, 3077th Evaluation Group, Edwards AFB, California, piloted by Capt. William Alexander Bailey Jr., and Maj. Gordon L. Payne, strikes a ridge in the Shadow Mountain range N of El Mirage Dry Lake, near Victorville, California, ~25 miles SE of Edwards AFB, while flying in overcast on approach to Edwards. All aboard are KWF. "In addition to Bailey and Payne, there were four Sergeants, and two civilians onboard. The sergeants were, Robert E. Mathusa, James H. Willingham, Lilburn N. Cate, and Carl A. Milhoan. The civilians were, C. A. White, and W. J. Christian. Both civilians worked for the Ryan Aircraft Co., and were classified as test engineers."

11 January
Boeing B-29-95-BW Superfortress bomber, 45-21771, c/n 13671, of the 3512th AMS, 3510th AMG, returning to Randolph Air Force Base, Texas, after a seven-hour training flight, crashed 10 miles SW of Seguin, Texas. At 8,000 feet the pilot, Captain Norman A. Bivens, cut off the automatic pilot and began descending through an overcast, flying on instruments. Bivens reported losing all flight instruments and the aircraft became uncontrollable. Six of the crew members were killed, while five others parachuted to safety.

15 January
A Douglas B-26C, 44-35736, (built as an A-26C-45-DT), of the 168th Bomb Squadron, Illinois Air National Guard, based at O'Hare International Airport, suffers heavy icing conditions, attempts an emergency landing at NAS Glenview, Illinois, but explodes in midair just before landing, coming down in Northbrook along Willow Road, spreading wreckage over a half mile area. All five on board, pilot Capt. Myron A. Bourland, two other officers, and two enlisted men are killed. All victims were reported to be residents of the Chicago area.

21 January
Lockheed P2V-4 Neptune, BuNo 124227 , of VP-22, deployed to WestPac during the Korean War on 1 November 1950 and based at Naha Air Base, Okinawa, is lost this date due to starboard engine failure during takeoff. The P2V crashed and sank in 20 fathoms of water one mile off the end of the runway. There were 11 survivors and two crewmen were listed as missing (their bodies were later recovered). Crew: Pilot LCDR William R. McDowell (seriously injured), LT J. T. White (seriously injured), LT (jg) K. R. Kiddoo (minor injury), ENS W. E. Todd (minor injury), LCDR J. G. Thompson (seriously injured), ADC F. L. Gabbard (minor injury), AD2 J. H. Raby (missing), ALC W. M. Benson Jr. (minor injury), AL3 B. G. Carter (missing), AT3 E. W. Ammons (minor injury), AT1 M. M. Iverson (minor injury), AO G. W. Wilt (minor injury), and AA C. D. Cowan (minor injury).

28 January
World War II fighter ace and test pilot Don S. Gentile is KWF Lockheed T-33A-1-LO Shooting Star, 49-905, of the 1053d AMS, 1050th AMG, which crashes at Forestville, Maryland, near Andrews AFB. Second crew also killed. Gentile Air Force Station, Kettering, Ohio, was named in his honor.

31 January
A Douglas C-54D-1-DC Skymaster, 282, c/n 10597, operated by the Força Aérea Portuguesa, crashes into the sea at 2303 hrs. while approaching Lajes Field, having taken off from Lisbon, Portugal, killing all 14 on board. Fatalities included two pilots, nine mechanics and three military personnel.

14 February
Major Raymond S. Wetmore, World War II ace (21.25 kills), and commander of the 59th Fighter-Interceptor Squadron at Otis Air Force Base, Massachusetts, is killed this date in the crash of North American F-86A-5-NA Sabre, 48-0149, c/n 151-43517 at age 27. After a cross-country flight from Los Angeles, California, to Otis AFB, he was on his final approach when his plane suddenly shot up skyward, and then turned towards the ground where it crashed. Raymond was killed instantly. He was reported to have said that he had trouble steering and ejecting from the plane. He was also reported to have said to the tower that, "I'm going to go up and bring it down in Wakeby Lake, so I don't hit any houses." When he died, he left a widow and four children.

13 March
1st Lt. Henry A. Crescibene suffers forced landing due to mechanical failure 3 miles W of Aldenhoven, Germany, in Republic F-84E-15-RE Thunderjet, 49-2379, of the 307th Fighter-Escort Squadron, 31st Fighter-Escort Group, based at RAF Manston. Aircraft damaged, pilot survives.

14 March
RAF Coastal Command Avro Lancaster GR.3, TX264, 'BS-D', of 120 Squadron RAF Kinloss, off-course in high winds and heavy overcast during a night-time navigation exercise between the Faroes and Rockall, crashes into Beinn Eighe's Triple Buttress at ~0200 hrs., just 15 feet (4.6 m) below the top of the 2,850-foot (870 m) westernmost gully of the buttress known as Coire Mhic Fhercair in the Scottish Highlands, killing all eight crew. Wreck not found until 17 March, crew remains not recovered until August. Due to remoteness of the crashsite the wreckage is still there.

17 March
A U.S. Navy Beechcraft JRB Expeditor, flying from Corry Field, Pensacola, Florida, suffering power loss, descends from "low-hanging clouds" and crashes in a meadow near Monroe, Louisiana, killing all six aboard and "hurling wreckage for half a mile." The bodies were so dismembered that state police could initially only identify five of the victims, although the sixth was later found a half mile away, stated a United Press report. An Associated Press report identifies the crash site as at Calhoun, Louisiana, and states that the explosion on impact spread wreckage "over a square mile." The only witness, M. A. Heisler, of East Monroe, stated that he heard the plane pass over his home shortly before 0500 hours, but it only caught his attention when he heard the engines sputter. He glanced out a window and saw the plane crash into woods in the pre-dawn with a "terrific explosion." Commander J. Walter Winslow, of Naval Air Station Pensacola, said the flight left Pensacola at 0237 hours, bound for Dallas, Texas. Killed were Lieut. (jg) Emmitt C. Burleson, Pensacola, the pilot; Ensign James F. Mahan, Texarkana, Arkansas, co-pilot; Robert Crittenden, photographer 1/C, Findlay, Ohio; Bert Thomas Fox, photographer 3/C, Fort Worth, Texas; John F. Hanrahan, apprentice, Fort Worth, Texas; and Harry William Hobbs, 25, of Frederick, Oklahoma, a naval reservist.

23 March

A United States Air Force Douglas C-124A Globemaster II, 49–244, c/n 43173, of the 2d Strategic Support Squadron, Strategic Air Command, en route from Gander, Newfoundland, to RAF Mildenhall, missing over the Atlantic Ocean; wreckage found near Ireland. 53 went MIA, including Gen. Paul T. Cullen and his command staff, en route to his headquarters of the newly activated 7th Air Division, SAC, at South Ruislip, London, England. Cullen had been deputy commander of Barksdale Air Force Base, Louisiana. The crew and passengers survived the water landing and were observed in the water, but none were recovered after an extensive search. It has been speculated that they may have been captured by Soviet naval forces.

3 April
Sole prototype Hawker P.1081, converted from second prototype Hawker P.1052, VX279, with 5,000 lb (2,300 kg). s.t. Rolls-Royce Nene turbojet, first flown 19 June 1950, crashes this date at high speed on the South Downs, killing pilot Squadron Leader T. S. "Wimpy" Wade, DFC, AFC, Hawker's chief test pilot. He attempts ejection but his non-Martin-Baker seat fails. Cause was never fully established, but aircraft may have gone out of control during dive and exceeded limitations, witnesses reported hearing sonic boom as it came down. Australian interest in building type under license disappears, both they and the Royal Air Force acquiring F-86s to fill requirement for a high-speed fighter. Program abandoned.

5 April
ALBUQUERQUE, N. M., April 5 (UP) – Six servicemen, one a reservist who went along “just for the ride,” were killed today when an Air Force C-45 plane crashed and burned high atop a 9,000-foot mountain. The plane was attached to the Sandia atomic weapons base here and five of those aboard were stationed at the base. Among the dead was Capt. Ralph I. Bowman, 29, of Los Angeles.

5 April
First of two pilotless Royal Australian Air Force GAF Pikas, (Project 'C'), A92-1, C-1, "P", crashes at Woomera, Australia, and is subsequently broken up. Second prototype is now on display at the RAAF Museum at Point Cook. Production drones will be built as GAF Jindiviks.

6 April
A USAF Grumman SA-16A Albatross, 48-0602, of the 5th Air Rescue Squadron, crashes into a concrete recreation center in Mount Clemens, Michigan, formerly used by the USO, and partially on a children's playground. School had not been let out and there were no children on the playground. Four of eight on the amphibian were injured. The plane "barely missed" a half dozen resort hotels as it crashed within three blocks of the downtown. Airframe to reclamation at Selfridge AFB on 23 April 1951.

8 April
A Douglas C-47D Skytrain (built as a C-47B-1-DK), 43-48298, c/n 25559, of the 123d Air Base Group, Godman AFB, Kentucky, with nine officers and 12 enlisted men on board to attend the funeral of a brother pilot who died in a crash Thursday, crashes ~eight miles NE of Kanawha Airport, Charleston, West Virginia, when it clips the top of a hill at ~1156 hrs. Nineteen are killed and two suffer serious burns. Wreckage of the plane was scattered over an area 250 feet wide by 100 feet long. A section of earth was gouged out on the side of the hill where the plane struck. It then apparently vaulted over the top of the hill and struck 50 feet on the other side, where it sheared off trees. Several Air Force veterans said if the plane had been 30 feet higher it would have cleared the hill top. At the time of the crash it was misting rain and the ceiling was almost at tree-top level. Pilot was Lt. Col. James K. McLaughlin of Charleston, deputy commanding officer of the 123d Fighter-Bomber Wing, of which the men are members. The two injured men were taken to Staats Hospital, where attendants said they had a 50–50 chance of surviving. They were identified as Capt. Harry K. Blackhurst of Charleston and Maj. Isaac E. Bonifas of Portland, Indiana. The airmen were to comprise an honor guard for the funeral at St. Albans yesterday of Maj. Woodford W. (Jock) Sutherland, 34. Sutherland, who was also stationed at Godman Air Force Base, was killed in a ground crash when his F-51 collided with another fighter at Eglin Air Force Base, Florida. Major General Victor E. Bertrandias, deputy inspector general for technical inspection and flight safety research for the USAF, dispatches a group of officers from Norton AFB, California, on 9 April, headed by Major. Brendan Dixon, investigator-analyst of the cargo branch of the Air Force's directorate of flying safety, headquartered at Norton.

25 April
Cubana de Aviación Flight 493, Douglas DC-4, registration CU-T188, (ex-C-54A-15-DC, 42-72263) c/n 10368, en route from Miami, Florida, United States, to Havana, Cuba, has a mid-air collision with US Navy Beechcraft SNB-1 Kansan, BuNo 39939, which was on an instrument training flight in the vicinity of Naval Air Station Key West at the same time. All 43 aboard the airliner and four on the SNB were killed. Flight 493 departed Miami at 1109 hrs. and was cleared to climb to 4,000 feet (1,200 m) on a direct heading to Key West. Approximately ten minutes later, the SNB-1 took off from NAS Key West for simulated instrument training. Although the flight was not cleared to a specific altitude or heading, standard instrument training procedures were in place. At 1149 hrs. Flight 493, heading south, and the SNB-1, heading west, collided over NAS Key West at an estimated altitude of 4,000 feet (1,200 m).

27 April
Convair B-36D-25-CF Peacemaker, 49-2658, of the 436th Bomb Squadron, 7th Bomb Wing, Carswell AFB, Texas, collides with F-51D-25-NT Mustang, 44-84973, of the 185th Tactical Reconnaissance Squadron, Oklahoma Air National Guard, out of Will Rogers Field, Oklahoma City, during gunner training NE of Perkins, Oklahoma, 55 Miles NE of Oklahoma City, Oklahoma, at ~1325–1330 hours. Mustang pilot Lt. Fred Black killed, as well as 13 of 17 B-36 crew. Killed in the Peacemaker was pilot Capt. Harold Leslie Barry, 31, who was the pilot of a B-36 that crashed in British Columbia in February 1950. Five men were lost in that accident. All the survivors of the mid-air escaped from the aft compartment behind the bomb-bay. They were Tech. Sgt. Ellis E. Maxon, 31, of 104 Lockwood, Fort Worth, Texas, scanner; 1st. Lt. Elroy A. Melberg, 32, of 516 Yount, Fort Worth, flight engineer; Master Sgt. W.M. Blair, 31, of 4117 Surrey, Fort Worth, crew chief; and Tech. Sgt. Dick Thrasher of 4421 Sandage, Fort Worth, gunnery instructor. Thrasher had also survived bail out from the British Columbia crash.

6 May
Convair B-36D-25-CF Peacemaker, 49-2660, of the 7th Bomb Wing, Carswell AFB, Texas, crashes while landing at Kirtland AFB, New Mexico, in high winds, 23 of 25 crew killed.

18 May
Gloster E.1/44, TX145, following test flight out of the Royal Aircraft Establishment (RAE), Farnborough, suffers damage when starboard undercarriage leg collapses on landing. Probably not repaired as it is struck off charge on 2 August and sent to the Proof and Experimental Establishment (PEE) at Shoeburyness.

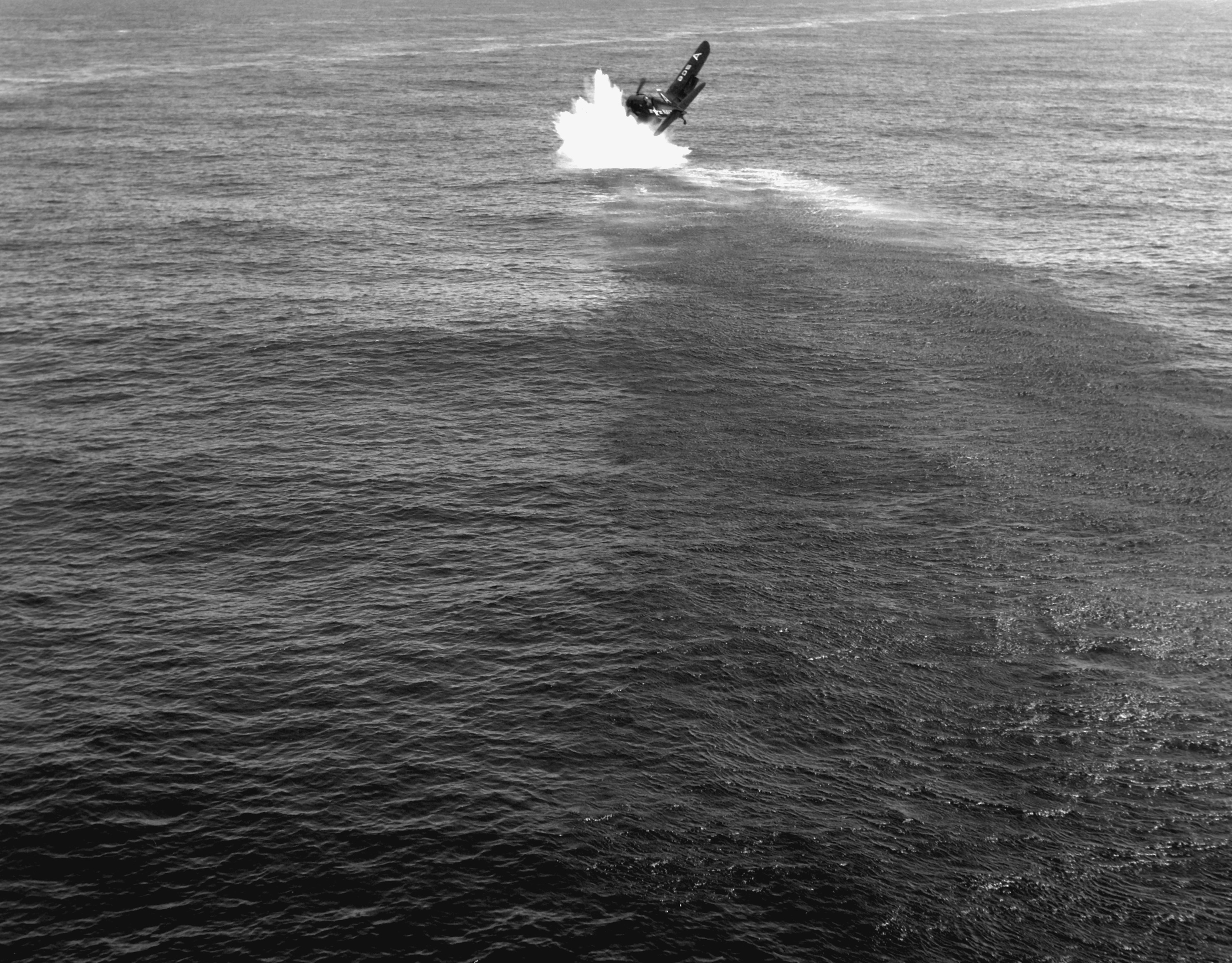
A F4U-4 of VF-884 crashes off the bow of USS Boxer (CV-21).

19 May
A U.S. Navy Vought F4U-4 Corsair, BuNo 81969, assigned to Fighter Squadron 884 "Bitter Birds", CVG-101, crashes after experiencing an engine failure on takeoff from the aircraft carrier USS Boxer (CV-21) on 19 May 1951 off Korea. The pilot, Lt.(jg) Oliver D. Droege, of Kansas City, Missouri (USA), was rescued by a helicopter. Another source identifies the pilot as Wallace Gene Richardson.

8 June
Eight USAF Republic F-84E Thunderjets of the 560th Fighter-Day Squadron, 12th Fighter Escort Group, Strategic Air Command, Bergstrom AFB, Texas, crash near Richmond, Indiana. Mission escorting B-36 Peacemaker bombers from Wright-Patterson AFB, Dayton, Ohio, to Selfridge AFB, Michigan. Worst mass air crash to date. Eight planes failed due to internal engine icing unknown to happen until this disaster. They were serials 50-1120, -1130, -1133, and -1209, and 51-0479, -0506, and -0679. Three pilots were killed. Approximately ten minutes after the 32-plane flight departed Wright-Patterson, the eight suffered engine failure. "Three of the pilots were killed as they dived into farm fields or manufacturing yards within a 25 mile circle around Richmond, Ind. The other five planes were brought into belly landings from which three pilots escaped unscathed and the other two suffered injuries. Bergstrom base identified one of the dead as Capt. Edward J. Moroney Jr., Austin, son of Mr. and Mrs. Edward J. Moroney of Highland Park, Ill. He also is survived by his wife and a daughter, 6. The other dead were listed as Maj. George W. Alexander, Austin, and 1st Lt. Robert E. Horne Jr., 24, Bergstrom air base, whose parents live in Gulfport, Miss." Maj. Richard E. Willsic (also reported as Willsie), in 50-1130, and Capt. Bryce E. Long, in 50-1120, parachuted from their aircraft, while Lt. Eustace Coltharp, in 51-0479, rode his plane in and escaped injury. Three other fighters which suffered partial power loss limped back into Wright-Patterson, while the remaining 21 landed at Selfridge. Sabotage as a cause is quickly discarded with initial suspicions falling on possible fuel contamination, as all of the flight had tanked up at the Dayton, Ohio, base before departure. Lt. Gen. Curtis LeMay heads up the investigation which initially samples fuel from the belly-landed jets as well as those that landed safely in Michigan to look for impurities. The presence of thunderstorms in the area is also acknowledged early in the investigation, with the three fatalities thought to have been due to pilots losing control of their powerless aircraft and then diving out of low clouds.

13 June
RAF English Electric Canberra B.1, VN850, bailed to Rolls-Royce for Avon engine tests. Crashed on approach to Hucknall with engine fire, coming down just outside field perimeter, killing Rolls-Royce test pilot R. B. Leach. This was the first loss of a Canberra.

15 June
RAF Bristol Brigand B.1, VS857, delivered 13 May 1949, 'OB-K', of 45 Squadron, based at RAF Station Tengah, crashes at ~1130 hrs., this date in the Kranji River, Singapore, killing the navigator/bomb aimer, although the pilot, Allan Martin, and radar operator, Peter A. Weston, survive. The Straits Times, Singapore, reported that despite the efforts of a working party, the crewman's body still had not been recovered by nightfall of 18 June, the twisted wreckage being located in the tidal portion of the river where low-water periods are brief, complicating the salvage and recovery. Deployed to fight Communist insurgents during the Malayan Emergency, the humid climate created operating problems for Brigands, not the least of which was a tendency to throw a propeller blade due to corrosion, the resultant imbalance shearing the engine from the wing, rendering the plane uncontrollable. VS857 lost its starboard engine in this manner. "Gas was spewing out and the aircraft was gyrotating, Alan could get no control at all except for the first couple of seconds, his words will never leave me, the plane was changing attitude all the way down, at first the engine bulkhead was acting like a dive brake just on one side, after that the controls gave up and she was in a dive, we hit the ground first at a slight angle, a bit of luck, (This all was surmised at the inquiry) the nose came away Alan was slung out for about 50/70 ft.into the water, it bounced on and over and `then` hit the water," recalled Weston. The wings and the fuselage demated on impact.

18 June
An infamous day in the history of RAF Biggin Hill when three Gloster Meteors and their pilots are killed in accidents, all three crashing in an area of about 100 yards. The first, a Mk.8, WB110, piloted by Flight Lieutenant Gordon McDonald of 41 Squadron, crashed shortly after take off, corkscrewing as pieces of structure fell from the aircraft. The aircraft hit a bungalow killing the pilot. The jet wash of his flight leader was named as a possible cause. Within seconds of this accident two Mk.4 Meteors of 600 Sqn., Royal Auxiliary Air Force, piloted by Sergeant Kenneth Clarkson and Squadron Leader Phillip Sandeman, both circling over the wreckage and preparing to land, collided at 2,000 feet (610 m) above the scene. Although Sandeman managed to bail out he was killed when his parachute failed to open. Clarkson was killed in his aircraft. A week after this incident, another Meteor overshot the runway, narrowly missing passing cars. After these incidents, several residents stated they would be "selling up" and there were calls for traffic lights to be sited on the Bromley road for use during take-offs and landings. Princess Elizabeth, soon to be Queen Elizabeth II, was visiting the station on this day.

21 June
On June 21, 1951, a PB4Y-2 Privateer patrol bomber on a training mission when the aircraft crashed in Skagit Bay about 50 miles north of Seattle killing 5 naval aviators with 5 survivors. Lt. Carl L. Hodge, Pilot departed NAS Seattle at 0611 PDT on a training flight through Admiralty Inlet and the Strait of Juan de Fuca at an altitude of 200 feet. Air to ground gunnery exercises were completed following which mining exercises commenced. Pilot descended from 500 feet to 300 feet on an easterly heading. Pilot commenced a left 20 degree banked turn at 160 knots. After turning 30 degrees towards North the aircraft struck the water. The Naval inquiry found it was not possible to determine with certainty the accident's primary cause. The aircraft had 10 aviators with 5 killed and 5 surviving. The 5 surviving members were exhaustively questioned none able to state the cause as either material or personnel error.

Possibilities of the accident are: Personnel errors: 1) at the time of the accident the plane was operating at an authorized altitude using radar pilotage which requires a high degree of skill and attention on the part of both pilot and crew; 2) Water over which the aircraft was flying was glassy making depth perception difficult; 3) No definitive evidence of material failure was presented to inquiry board; 4) Since radar operator was able to maintain a good picture on his scope prior to accident with no radical maneuvers being made prior to accident; 5) in view of the foregoing, pilot misjudged altitude due to glassy water, and even with unrestricted visibility, could fly the plane into the water. The pilot was seaplane qualified with 3700 hours total flying time.

Deceased: 1) Aviation Ordnanceman Third Class Donald W. Cunningham; 2) Aviation Chief Radioman Richard McDaniel Tucker; 3) Aviation Electronics Man First Class Anthony Vano; 4) Pilot/Navigator Franklin Percival Goulburn; and 5) Herbert William Hedquist.

Survivors: Pilot in Command Carl L. Hodge; 2) James L. Babb; 3) Aircraft Mechanic Ronald D. McWilliams; 4) Aviation Electronics-Man Curley A. Owens; and 5) Aircraft Mechanic Robert F. Phillips.

23 June
Second Avro CF-100 Mk.1, 19102, 'FB-K', crashes on the day it is handed over to the RCAF.

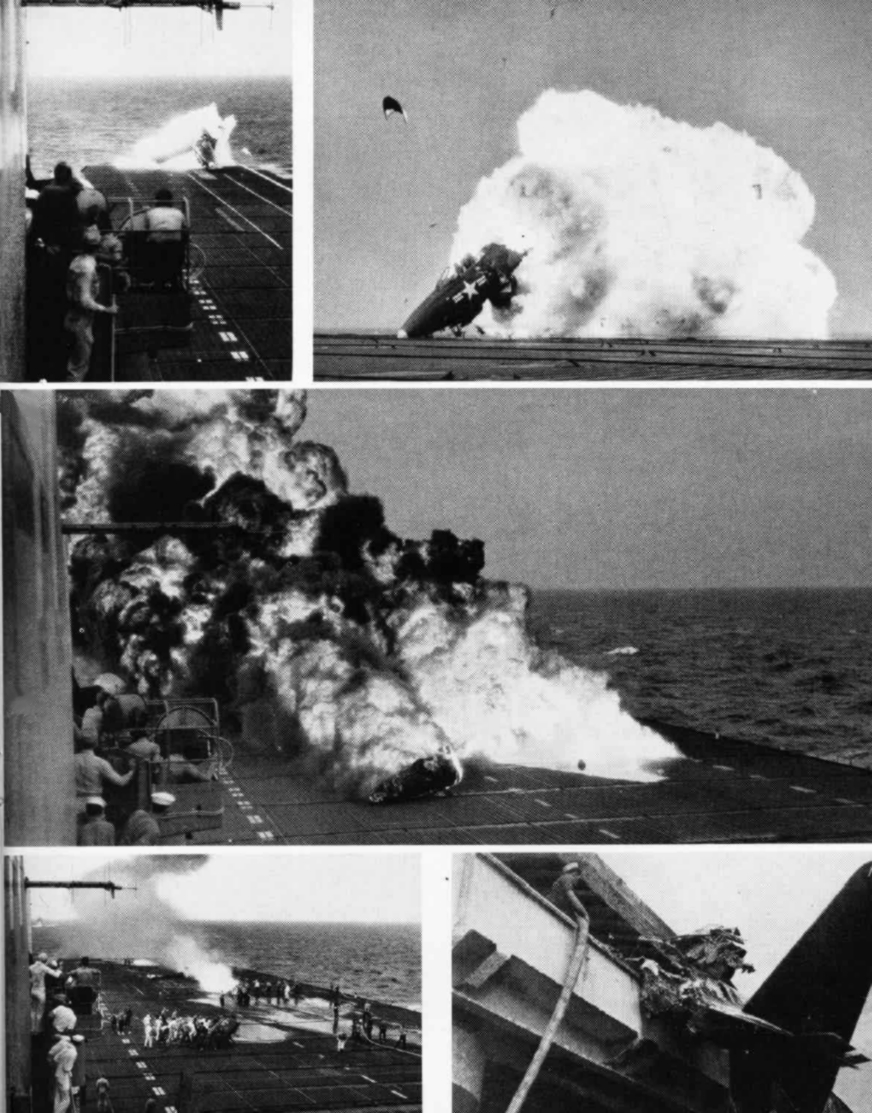
Cdr. Duncan's crash on USS Midway, 23 June 1951.

23 June
The famous non-fatal Grumman F9F-2 Panther ramp strike accident occurs as Cdr. George Chamberlain Duncan attempts landing on USS Midway in BuNo 125228, during carrier suitability tests in the Atlantic Ocean. Forward fuselage breaks away and rolls down the deck, pilot suffering burns. Footage of this accident has been used in several films including Men of the Fighting Lady, Midway, and The Hunt for Red October.

30 June
The second prototype Republic XF-91 Thunderceptor, 46–681, had an engine failure during takeoff from Edwards AFB, California. Republic Aviation test pilot Carl Bellinger escaped from the aircraft just as the tail melted off; total flight time was a mere ninety seconds. By the time fire apparatus arrived, driving seven miles (11 km) across the dry lake bed, the tail section had been reduced to ashes.

8 July
Supermarine Spitfire Tr.IX 163 of the Irish Air Corps made a wheels-up landing on delivery at Baldonnel Airfield. Subsequently repaired and entered service.

31 July
SAN DIEGO, July 31 (AP) – A Navy fighter plane carried its pilot to flaming death in a crash near Mt. Palomar today. The Corsair fighter was on a flight from the San Diego naval air station. It exploded as it struck and the flames spread in dry grass, burning over about an acre in the dry hills, about 50 miles north of here. The pilot has not been identified.

Summer
A 7th Bomb Wing Convair B-36 Peacemaker crew on a training mission out of Carswell AFB, Texas, to the Eglin AFB bombing range in the Gulf of Mexico off the Florida panhandle to drop an unarmed obsolete Mark 4 nuclear gravity bomb on a water target. Due to past mechanical problems, the bombardier was briefed to open the bomb bay doors at the Initial Point (IP). Although the bomber's bombing navigation radar was still in the navigation mode, the bomb dropped unexpectedly when the bay doors were opened, and the 5,000 lb (2,300 kg). of high explosives in the weapon burst in the air over a non-designated target area. An intensive investigation concluded that a corroded D-2 switch, a hand-held bomb release switch, was found to be in the "closed" position and the bomb was dropped through equipment malfunction.

13 August
A Boeing Boeing B-50D-110-BO Superfortress, 49-0268, on test flight out of Boeing Field, Seattle, Washington after modifications, suffers problems immediately after take off, fails to gain altitude, comes down two miles (3 km) N of field, clipping roof of a brewery with the starboard wing, cartwheels into wooden Lester Apartments, wreckage and structure burns for hours. Six on bomber (three Air Force crew, three Boeing employees) and five on ground die.

18 August
Boeing XB-47-BO Stratojet, 46-065, first prototype of two, stalls on landing, suffers major structural damage. No injuries. Another source cites date of 18 August 1950.

21 August
A Lockheed T-33A-1-LO Shooting Star, 49-917, of the 5th Fighter-Interceptor Squadron, 52d Fighter-Interceptor Group, crashes on take off from McGuire Air Force Base into a scrub pine forest at adjacent Fort Dix, New Jersey, killing the two crew and spraying burning fuel over a group of 54 U.S. Army soldiers assigned to B battery of the Ninth division's 26th Field Artillery Battalion, wrapping up an army communications exercise, killing 11 and injuring 20. The trainer, unable to gain altitude, clips trees at the edge of a clearing and impacts 50 feet (15 m) from an army six-by-six troop carrier vehicle upon which some soldiers had already boarded. Others were lined up in formation close by. Eight died almost instantly and three succumbed later in hospital. All Army fatalities were 22 or younger, all hailed from New York, New Jersey, and Connecticut, and all had been in the army for less than five months. Also killed were pilot Capt. William H. Raub, (also reported as William H. Rauh), 31, of Seattle, and his passenger, Maj. Theodore Deakyne, 30, of Levittown, New York. "It was an unfortunate tragedy – a remarkable coincidence of circumstances which brought the plane to the spot where the men were on the verge of moving out. Thirty seconds later might have made a lot of difference," Lt. Bertram Brinley, Fort Dix public information officer, said.

22 August
Bell X-1D, 48-1386, suffers fire/explosion internally while being carried aloft for its first flight, jettisoned from mothership, Boeing B-29-96-BO Superfortress, 45-21800, impacting on Rogers Dry Lakebed, Edwards AFB, California.

26 August
Handley Page HP.88, VX330, a two-fifths scale flying testbed for the Handley Page HP.80 Victor bomber to prove crescent wing design, breaks up in flight when the rear fuselage separates during a manoeuvre. During a high-speed, low-level pass over Stansted's main runway, it suffered a failure of its slab-type tailplane's servo-control system, producing severe oscillations that subjected the airframe to excessive G-forces, causing the ship to break up, killing pilot D. J. P. Broomfield.

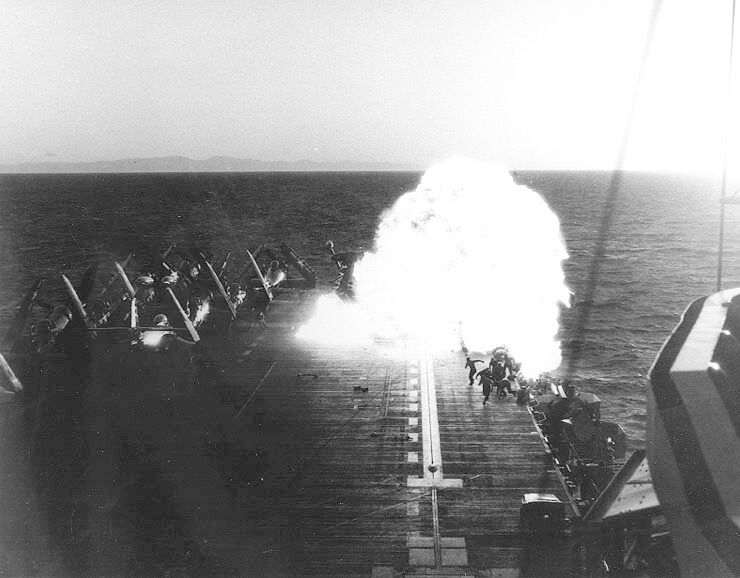
US Navy personnel aboard aircraft carrier USS Essex (CV-9) flee as McDonnell F2H-2 Banshee strikes parked aircraft and explodes; 16 September 1951.

27 August
"HAWTHORNE, Aug. 27 UP – Northrop Aircraft pilot James Bugbee, 29, was seriously injured today when his F-89 twin-jet Scorpion crashed off the end of the runway at Hawthorne Municipal airport [sic] during its initial takeoff attempt."

3 September
"CLINTON, N. C., Sept. 3, UP – An Air Force B-26 bomber crashed and exploded in a desolate wooded area three miles south of here early today, trapping one helpless airman and burning him to death while three others floated to safety. Air Force officials withheld the name of the dead airman pending notification of next of kin. Capt. Irvin Rappaport, public information officer of the Ninth Air Force at Pope Air Force base [sic], N. C., said he was not a member of the bomber's crew, but was riding as a passenger."

16 September
A damaged McDonnell F2H-2 Banshee jet fighter, BuNo 124968, of VF-172, returning to the US Navy aircraft carrier USS Essex, on its first Korean War cruise, misses the recovery net and crashes into several planes parked on the ship's deck, killing seven and destroying four aircraft, two F2H-2s, BuNos. 124966 and 124968, both of VF-172. and two F9F-2 Panthers, BuNos. 125128 and 125131, of VF-51. This crash led the USN to equip all future carriers with angled flight decks for safer airplane recovery.

25 September
Two North American F-86E Sabres in a flight of three from the 97th Fighter-Interceptor Squadron, 142d Fighter-Interceptor Group, Wright-Patterson AFB, Ohio, flying from west to east out of Wallaceburg, Ontario, 25 miles S of Sarnia, touch wings in mid-air at ~10,000 feet and both crash, exploding about a mile apart on farms in Western Ontario. Both pilots are killed.

29 September
A Royal Air Force Boeing Washington B.1, WF555, of 57 Squadron, RAF Waddington, experiences runaway propeller on number 3 (starboard inner) engine which hits number 4 (starboard outer) causing severe damage. Three crew in rear fuselage ordered to bail out before bomber makes successful wheels-up landing at a disused airfield near Amiens, France – no casualties, but airframe written off. Scrapped 3 January 1952.

6 October
Dakota, HJ-920, of the No. 12 Squadron IAF was on its way from England to India. While flying over the Mediterranean between Malta and Cyprus, the aircraft encountered adverse weather conditions over Cyprus. Emergency landing at Nicosia was not possible because of poor visibility. The aircraft lost its way in the fog and crashed near Gulnar in the Mersin province in Southern Turkey. The crash resulted in the death of all five crew. The fledgling Indian Air Force's third senior-most officer Air Commodore Narendra and Flying Officers P. V. Phillipose and Sunil Kumar Ghosh and Sergeants B. S. Gill and Sergeant D'Souza were killed.

15 October
Convair B-36D-35-CF Peacemaker, 49-2664, c/n 127, '664', triangle 'J' tail markings, of the 436th Bomb Squadron, 7th Bomb Wing, Carswell AFB, Texas, experiences main gear extension failure, pilot Maj. Leslie W. Brockwell bellies it in at Kirtland AFB, New Mexico, with just the nose gear extended, doing such a deft job that this is the only B-36 ever crashlanded that was returned to flight.

11 November
An Argentine Air Force Vickers VC.1 Viking T-77 crashed at Morón Air Base.

13 November
A USAF Fairchild C-82A-FA Packet, 45-57801, c/n 10171, 'CQ-801', of the 11th Troop Carrier Squadron, 60th Troop Carrier Group, en route from Rhein-Main Air Base, Germany to Bordeaux–Mérignac Airport, France, goes off-course due to wind drift, compounded with having received weather briefings for 8,000 feet (2,400 m), but flew at 6,000 feet (1,800 m), hits the side of Mt. Dore in poor weather at ~1300 hrs., 20 miles (32 km) SW of Clermont-Ferrand, France. Six crew and 30 passengers all killed. It was transporting US Army postal workers to set up a military post office at Bordeaux, France. This remains the worst all-time C-82 accident in terms of human loss.

19 November
A Boeing B-47B-5-BW Stratojet, 50-006, crashes shortly after an afternoon take-off at Edwards Air Force Base, California, killing three crew. The bomber comes down a quarter mile W of the runway and explodes. Officials at the base said the bomber was beginning a routine test flight. Killed are Captain Joseph E. Wolfe Jr., the pilot, Chattanooga, Tennessee; Major Robert A. Mortland, 30, co-pilot, of Clarion, Pennsylvania, and Sergeant Christy N. Spiro, 32, of Worcester, Massachusetts.

27 November
French Leduc 0.22-01 ramjet-powered prototype interceptor is badly damaged in landing accident and the pilot seriously injured.

3 December
A Boeing B-29A-45-BN Superfortress, 44-61797, of the 3417th AMS, 3415th AMG, Lowry AFB, Colorado, piloted by James W. Shanks, trying to reach Lowry Air Force Base in Denver, Colorado, with one motor not working crashed into a row of residential homes, killing eight airmen. At least one civilian and five airmen were injured. Five houses were damaged – four of them demolished.

7 December
The 6555th Guided Missile Squadron at Cape Canaveral, Florida, launches Martin B-61 Matador, GM-547. Lift-off and flight were normal, but the missile did not respond properly to guidance signals, and it finally went out of control and fell into the Atlantic 15 minutes and 20 seconds after launch. The flight covered a distance of 105 miles.

21 December
English Electric Canberra B2, USAF 51-17387, ex-RAF WD932, used as pattern aircraft for Martin B-57 Canberra, crashes during flight from Martin plant at Middle River, Maryland, north of Baltimore. It lost a wing during a 4.8g manoeuvre at 10,000 feet (3,000 m) over Centerville, Maryland, on the Delmarva Peninsula due to incorrect fuel handling that led to tail heaviness which caused loss of control during the high g manoeuvring. Both crew members ejected, but the engineer-observer, Captain Reid Johns Shaw, 29, was killed when his parachute failed to open.
22 December
DENVER AP – A two-engined B-25 bomber with eight persons aboard, including one woman, crashed in an East Denver residential Saturday night. No homes were hit and no one was killed. Two aboard the plane were injured. Lowry Air Base officials said the injuries were not believed to be serious. One motor appeared to burn as the plane came down on its belly about 400 yards from the nearest dwelling. The scene was less than a mile from where a four-engined B-29 crashed Dec. 3, killing eight crewmen and destroying or damaging five homes. The woman on the plane is a Waf. Air Force officials at Lowry Field said the plane was from Andrews Field, Maryland, and was taking off for Perrin Air Force Base near Sherman, Tex.”

== 1952 ==
12 January
Prototype RAF Vickers Valiant, WB210, catches fire during in-flight engine relight trials, crew bails out but the co-pilot is killed when his ejection seat strikes tail.

15 January
French Leduc 0.16 research ramjet suffers landing gear collapse on its first flight and is damaged.

19 January
Boeing SB-17G Flying Fortress, 44-85746A, built as a B-17G-105-VE, of the 4th Air Rescue Squadron, McChord Air Force Base, Washington, returning from a mission, clips a ridge in Washington state's Olympic Peninsula, 20 miles from Sequim, slides into a 2,000-foot valley, shedding parts and men as it goes. Three of eight on board are killed. Survivors are rescued by helicopter the following day. Much of the wreckage is still there.

21 January
Second prototype of Arsenal VG 90 turbojet strike fighter design for the Aéronavale, VG-90.02, first flown June 1951, crashes this date killing pilot Claude Dellys.

22 January
Avro Lincoln B.Mk.2 SX923, 49 Squadron RAF: Written off (destroyed): Flew into the ground on GCA (Ground Controlled Approach) to RAF Marham, Norfolk. Per the official report: " On the night of 22 January 1952, Avro Lincoln SX923 of 49 Sqn was diverted to Marham from its home airfield at Upwood. While circling to land, the aircraft crashed near the Downham Market road at Black Drove, Fincham. The wreckage was spread over a wide area. Rescuers managed to drag the only survivor, Air Gunner Sergeant John F Green clear, who was seriously injured."
The 49 Squadron Association's record into the incident reads as follows:
"On the night of 22nd January 1952, Avro Lincoln SX923 of 49 Sqn was diverted to Marham from its home airfield at Upwood. While circling to land, the aircraft crashed near the Downham Market road at Black Drove, Fincham. The wreckage was spread over a wide area. Rescuers managed to drag the only survivor, Sgt J F Groom clear who was seriously injured. F/O Chatterjee (one of those killed) was attached to the squadron for two weeks training from No.81 Reserve Centre.

It is believed that the crash was caused when the starboard inner engine failed while the aircraft had full flaps applied for the final stages of the approach to Runway 06". The casualties were:
- Flight Sergeant (781020B) Boleslaw Wejman (pilot, aged 30) - killed, buried at Wood Lane Cemetery, Ramsey, Huntingdonshire

- Flight Sergeant (1457278) Robert Erddyn Griffith - killed, buried at Wood Lane Cemetery, Ramsey, Huntingdonshire - Sergeant (1569283) William Pickering (Navigator, aged 28) - killed, buried at St Mary Magdalene Church, Whalton, Northumberland, - Sergeant (579107) Frederick Robert Edwards (Flight Engineer, aged 25) killed, buried at Poole Cemetery, Poole, Dorset - Flying Officer (196342) Moni Lall Chatterjee (Wireless Operator, aged 37) - killed, cremated at Golders Green Crematorium, London NW11. Flying Officer Chatterjee's ashes were removed from Golders Green following cremation.

Links: Crash of an Avro 694 Lincoln B.2 in RAF Marham: 5 killed | Bureau of Aircraft Accidents Archives 49squadron.co.uk/personnel_index/detail/Wejman_FNU 49 Squadron Association : Personnel Index - Detail 49 Squadron Association : Personnel Index - Detail 49 Squadron Association : Personnel Index - Detail Catalogue description Squadron Number: 49 Summary of Events: Y

24 January
Grumman SA-16A Albatross, 51-001, c/n G-74, of the 580th Air Resupply Squadron (a Central Intelligence Agency air unit of the Air Resupply and Communications Service), on cross-country flight from Mountain Home AFB, Idaho, to San Diego, California, suffers failure of port engine over Death Valley, crew of six successfully bails out at ~1830 hrs. with no injuries, walks S some 14 miles to Furnace Creek, California, where they are picked up the following day by an SA-16 from the 42d Air Rescue Squadron, March AFB, California. The abandoned SA-16 crashes into Towne Summit mountain ridge of the Panamint Range W of Stovepipe Wells with starboard engine still running. Wreckage is still there.

29 January
Convair B-36D Peacemaker, 44-92080, of the 92nd Bomb Wing, lands short at Fairchild AFB, written off. All crew survive. Aircraft had been built as a B-36B-20-CF, upgraded.

6 February
Martin P4M-1Q Mercator, BuNo 124371, based in Port Lyautey, French Morocco, staging out of Nicosia, Cyprus. Operationally attached to NCU-32G. Returning from the Black Sea made an open ocean dead-stick landing east of Cyprus. Lt. Robert Hager, killed, 14 survivors rescued by HMS Chevron.

19 February
A Fairey Firefly of 816 Squadron RAN goes missing, and is believed to have crashed into the sea near Moruya, New South Wales. Lieutenant Brian Wall and Sub Lieutenant Douglas Saunders are both lost.

22 February
Second accident in three days for 816 Squadron RAN occurs when a Fairey Firefly carrying Sub Lieutenant Durrant Small and Observer J. G. Sharp crashes into the sea near Seven Mile Beach, New South Wales. Both Small and Sharp are killed.

3 March
A Royal Air Force Vickers Valetta VW153 crashed on take-off from RAF Butterworth, Malaya.

21 March
10 Navy airmen are killed when a four-engine Consolidated PB4Y-2 Privateer patrol bomber, bound for NAS Alameda, California, dives into Corpus Christi Bay less than a mile from Naval Air Station Corpus Christi, Texas. All aboard the plane are killed. KWF are: four officers, Lt. William Ervin Dozier, Ltjg Bertram Magna Roeder, Delangton Ernest Ruttledge, and Rodney Gwynn Williams; two Naval Air Cadets, Richard Wilfred Augrain, and Robert Benedict Nye; and four enlisted crew, Aviation Machinists Mate Airman Richard Charles Chase, Aviation Machinists Mate Third Class John Leonard Daffenberg, Airman Donald Jarrell Givens, and Airman Apprentice Robert Herman Steinbaugh.

21 March
A USAF North American B-45A-5-NA Tornado, 47-075, of the 85th Bomb Squadron, 47th Bomb Group, crashes shortly after departure from Reese AFB, Texas, on the return leg of a cross-country training flight to its home base at Langley AFB, Virginia, from Mather AFB, California, killing all four crew. The bomber came down 22 miles (35 km) NW of Paducah, Texas in Cottle County, in a severe dust storm. The wife of a railroad worker, Mrs. I. R. Hull, saw the plane plunge to earth near the small community of Narcisso and notified a funeral home at Paducah. It was several hours before searching parties reached the scene. KWF were pilot 1st Lt. Billy M. Reynolds, 26, Cleveland, Mississippi; Lt. Winfred R. Weller, Denver, Colorado; Cpl. Henry G. Geiger, 19, Cedar Rapids, Iowa; and Pfc. Thomas F. Penninger, 21, gunner, son of Mr. and Mrs. Harlon M. Penninger, Lubbock, Texas.

3 April
A United States Air Force Boeing B-29A-65-BN Superfortress, 44-62164, crashes at night. Suspected reason – Fuel line issues. The crew bailed out over a farmer's field 8 miles (13 km) N/5.5 miles W of Onaga, Kansas, United States. The captain died in the crash and one airman perished when his parachute failed to open. In addition, several cattle were killed. The surviving crew was fired at by the farmer, who believed them to be invading "ruskies".

4 April
A United States Air Force Douglas C-124A-DL Globemaster II, 50-1260, collides at night in midair with a Douglas VC-47D Skytrain, 45-926, c/n 16929/34187, over Mobile, Alabama, United States; 15 die.

15 April
While making a maximum gross weight takeoff at ~ 0345 hrs., a Convair B-36B-10-CF Peacemaker, 44-92050, c/n 47, failed to become safely airborne and crashed off the end of a runway at Fairchild AFB. The aircraft was airborne briefly for ~ a quarter mile, when one starboard engine began backfiring and caught fire, followed by the shutdown of all six engines. The aircraft then skidded on its nose for another quarter mile, struck a ditch, and exploded. A "large heavy object (of highly classified nature)" tore through the front of the plane on impact, causing severe injuries to many crewmen. Later, amid several smaller explosions, a huge single explosion shook the ground. Seventeen men were aboard the plane; 15 were killed and two survived with major injuries. Joe Baugher states that the aircraft failed to climb out due to mis-set elevator trim which kept nose down on takeoff.

27 April
A United States Air Force Republic F-84 Thunderjet (Serial Number 49-2111) crashed in the streets of St Peter's, Kent killing approximately 3 people. The plane came from the nearby Manston Airport and the engine caught fire mid flight. On Tuesday 8th April 2003, the Mayor of Broadstairs and St peter's (Hazel Pinder-White) unveiled the memorial.

9 May
Maj. Neil H. Lathrop attempts low-level aileron roll in second prototype Martin XB-51-MA, 46–686, crashes at end of runway at Edwards AFB, California with fatal result.

9 May
French Leduc 0.16 research ramjet again suffers landing gear collapse on touchdown and is damaged. After several more flights in 1954, it will be retired to the Musée de l'Air.

5 June
Exercise Bluebird: a Royal Netherlands Air Force Republic F-84 Thunderjet collided with the mast of the British Royal Navy motor launch HMML 2582 and crashed onto the deck in flames. The launch sank with the loss of fifteen crew and the pilot of the Thunderjet. The accident occurred in the Marsdiep, Netherlands.

13 June
Republic F-84G-11-RE Thunderjet, 51-10121, of the 127th Pilot Training Group, crashes near Luke AFB, Arizona, after colliding with Douglas B-26B-66-DL Invader, 44-34673, c/n 22952. Fighter pilot killed.

24 June
On the eighth test flight of the first Convair YB-60-1-CF, 49-2676, a flutter condition resulted in the trim tab disintegrating and the rudder suffering severe torsional wrinkles while flying at 263 mph (423 km/h) at 35,000 feet (11,000 m). Replaced by rudder built for second prototype which never received one and never flew. As the Boeing B-52 project was succeeding, the Convair B-60 program was canceled and the two airframes were salvaged in 1954 for parts.

30 June
A Royal Canadian Air Force bomber with four aboard goes missing in the Yukon. Still missing on 4 July.

8 July
Israeli IAF/DF de Havilland Mosquito T.3, 2119, as Capt. Daniel Shapira demonstrates a take-off to Lt. Ze'ev Tavor it goes badly, airframe ending up in the weeds. Despite this, both pilots eventually become test pilots. This was the first Israeli loss of the type.

10 July
A Boeing B-29-95-BW Superfortress, 45-21761, c/n 13655, converted to F-13A, crashes on the runway at Fairchild AFB, Washington, with ROTC cadets on board. There were no casualties, although the aircraft was a total loss and the hulk was later used by the fire department for practice fires.

11 July
Seven of eight crew survive the crash landing of a Boeing SB-17 Flying Fortress, of the 10th Air Rescue Squadron at Anchorage, Alaska, when it fails to return from a search for an RCAF bomber, missing since 30 June with four aboard. The Fortress had apparently completed its six hour search sweep and was en route to Whitehorse when it crashed. The last radio message, shortly before noon, stated that they were over their search area in fair to good weather. The hunt for the B-17 began at 2015 hrs. when it had not returned by fuel exhaustion limits. An amphibian sighted the downed plane in the night and dropped food and sleeping bags. American parachutists jumped to the downed crew's aid on 12 July and three helicopters – two American and one Canadian – began moving survivors to Snag, Yukon territory, about 30 miles SW of the crash site. A seriously burned crewman was ferried by C-47 to Elmendorf Air Force Hospital at Anchorage. Two other survivors were not as seriously injured.

25 July
French Leduc 0.22-01 ramjet-powered prototype interceptor, repaired following 27 November 1951 landing accident, strikes its SNCASE Languedoc launch aircraft, F-BCUT, on release and is forced to make a belly-landing. Limited range of design causes project to be dropped and second prototype not completed.

29 July
A Royal Air Force Boeing Washington B.1, WW349, hit while parked at Wisley, Surrey by Vickers Valiant, WJ954, in taxi accident. No injuries. Airframe had been intended for transfer to RAAF as third of three.

5 August
Convair B-36D-25-CF Peacemaker, 49-2661, c/n 121, on bailment to Convair, San Diego, California, crashes into San Diego Bay at 1430 PDT, while on a normal shakedown flight following completion of "San-San" project modification. The number 5 engine catches fire in flight and then falls off the wing. The aircraft is destroyed by impact and explosion. Four of the eight crewmembers, all Convair flight test employees, receive minor injuries, two are uninjured, and two are lost, first flight engineer W. W. Hoffman, by drowning, while the pilot, David H. Franks, 40, stays with the plane to manoeuvre it out to sea and away from occupied land. His body is never found. Coast Guard planes rescue four and Navy ships pick up two. The rescued, none seriously injured, are R. W. Adkins, co-pilot; Kenneth Rogers, flight engineer, W. F. Ashmore, Roy E. Sommers, D. R. Maxion and W. E. Wilson, all of San Diego. The UB88 Project dive team determined that the bomber actually came down in the Pacific off of Mission Beach.

6 August
A fire breaks out on the hangar deck of the USS Boxer at ~0530 hrs. when a fuel tank of a Grumman F9F Panther catches fire while the ship is conducting combat operations in the Sea of Japan. The blaze is extinguished after a four- to five-hour fight. The final total of casualties was determined to be: 8 dead, 1 missing, 1 critically injured, 1 seriously burned and some 70 overcome by smoke. Of the 63 who had gone over the side, all were rescued and returned to the Boxer by helicopters and ships of Task Force 77. Eighteen aircraft, mostly Grumman F9F-2 Panthers, were damaged (by fire and saltwater) or destroyed.

7 August
A U.S. Navy Martin PBM-5S Mariner, BuNo 84774, 'SE-7', of VP-892, crashes on the west slope of Bataan Mountain, in Luzon's Mariveles Mountains near the entrance to Manila Bay, the Philippines. Thirteen bodies were recovered from the wreckage, with no survivors. SE-7 had departed Naval Station Sangley Point, Philippines, on a patrol in extremely bad weather. Reported losing one engine and was attempting to return to base on single engine. KWF were LT Thomas Leslie Rhodes Jr., PPC, LTJG Robert Fred Bahlman, ENS Lee Marvin Moore, AD1 Charles Chauncey, AD3 William E. Bailey, AL1 John Stanley Dedman, AL3 Forrest B. Nance, AL3 William F. O'Hare, AL3 James Alfred Smith Jr., AO2 Tommy T Simmons, AN Edward Joseph Gimburek, AN Sidney Paul Krasnesky, Aviation Photographer's Mate Donald Elwin Spence.

8 August
Whilst on a night ASW patrol flight, a U.S. Navy Martin PBM-5S Mariner, BuNo 87842, 'SE-2', of VP-892, out of MCAS Iwakuni (on temporary assignment out of Naval Station Sangley Point, the Philippines), crashes into a mountain on Shikoku Island, Japan. The entire crew, including five officers and nine enlisted men, are KWF. Lost are: LT Howard L. "Sam" Cornish (PPC), LT (jg) Steven Arthur Dobbins, LT (jg) Donald E. Richardson, ENS Wayne Grogan, LT Ebbie Wells (Squadron Maintenance Officer), ADC Lee Ladd, AD2 George J. Brambinck, AD3 John Edward Meriwether, AL2 William Morrison Grayson, AL3 Joseph Arnold Hall Jr., AO 3 Davis Mawney, AN Roscoe Bence, AN L. Lowell and AN George A., Murray Jr. "It was vectored into a mountain by radar ground control. Investigation revealed that a U.S. Air Force ground controller, unfamiliar with the extremely slow climb performance of a loaded Mariner, had assumed SE-2 had reached an altitude to clear the hills."

25 August
Building 100 on the flightline at Eglin Air Force Base, Florida, is named the Audette Airborne Systems Building. A dedication plaque at the front entrance reads: "In memory of Lieutenant Colonel Leo R. Audette, United States Air Force – in recognition of his contribution in the development of airborne electronics systems – who on 25 August 1952, while a member of this command, gave his life while participating in operations which advanced the development of these systems." His aircraft, DB-17G Flying Fortress drone control ship, 44-83680, built as a B-17G-90-DL, is accidentally shot down by F-86D-1-NA Sabre, 50-469, of the 3200th Proof Test Group, flown by Colonel Arthur R. DeBolt, 39, of Columbus, Ohio. Colonel William Arthur "Mac" McWhorter was piloting the mother ship with a QB-17 drone in trail over the Gulf of Mexico for a radar-controlled approach by the jet fighter, "which by mistake fired a rocket that sent a B-17 bomber spinning into flames into the Gulf of Mexico. Six of eight crewmen on the bomber may have been killed. The Air Force said the pilot, DeBolt, apparently mistook the B-17 mother" [sic] plane for a radio-controlled drone during a test operation. Col. DeBolt was overcome with grief by the tragic error."

Two Shot Down By Error Survive – Weary Pair Battled Gulf for 24 Hours

PANAMA CITY, Fla. AP – Thirst for drinking water was the chief worry of two weary airmen during a 24-hour battle in the storm-swept Gulf of Mexico in a life raft. They were brought here Tuesday.

S-Sgt. Charles D. Jones, 31, of Meridian, Miss., and Airman 2-c Peter R. Rosing, 22, of Ingleside, Ill., were the only known survivors of a B-17 bomber shot down by mistake Monday by a new-type automatically-controlled jet fighter.

HAD NO DOUBTS

We never had any doubts but that we would be picked up,' said Jones, a sandy-haired veteran of six years with the Air Force. 'Our only real concern was whether we'd be able to last until we got some good drinking water.

Jones and Rosing were picked up by a Coast Guard minesweeper Tuesday, then transferred to an Air Force rescue boat for an 18-mile run in to Tyndall Air Force Base. A C-47 took them to the base hospital at Eglin Air Force Base north [sic] of here.

For security reasons, newsmen were not permitted to ask the airmen about the accident which caused their plight.

SUFFERS BURNS

Rosing, a stocky, black-haired youth, was brought off the crash boat on a stretcher. He suffered second and third degree burns about the hands and face when his plane caught fire. He also was suffering from shock, and medics administered plasma as soon as he arrived.

Jones said his first thought when the plane was hit was to jump, even though he'd never made a parachute jump before in his life.

An Air Force C-47 spotted the raft bobbing about in the Gulf 60 miles southwest of Panama City, and directed the minesweeper Seer to the spot.

Both came aboard under their own power, although Rosing had severe burns of the face and hands caused when the plane caught fire. Before the rescue they spent 24 gruelling hours being tossed about by 15 feet high waves in the Gulf.

The Air Force refused to give up hope for the remaining crewmen. It speculated that heavy currents might have carried any other survivors several miles from the spot where the plane came down.

A large force of air and surface rescue craft ranged over a wide area of the Gulf searching for remaining crewmen.

The rocket that sent the B-17 plunging into the Gulf was fired by the pilot of an F-86D. This is the Air Force's newest all-weather fighter, which has been undergoing operational suitability tests at the air proving ground at Eglin before being placed in combat service.

The Air Force said the pilot, Col. Arthur R. DeBolt, 39, of Columbus, O., apparently mistook the B-17 "mother" plane for an uninhabited radio controlled drone which it was guiding.

Col. DeBolt described by the Air Force in Washington as "an exceptional officer," was grief stricken at the error, and said he was unable to explain it.

He saw the hit plainly on his radarscope and figured it was scored on the drone.

The first I new [sic] it was a mistake, I heard a voice on the radio from one of the other planes accompanying us saying, 'Watch for chutes. He got the wrong plane.'

Colonel DeBolt was the commanding officer of the 2d Air Commando Group from its activation on 22 April 1944, and of the 67th Reconnaissance Wing from 25 November 1947 to 24 August 1948. He was promoted to the rank of brigadier general in 1962. An Eglin AFB website gives the accident date as 23 August 1952, although period press coverage clearly states the date as 25 August. Missing (and killed) were Lt. Col. Leo R. Audette, 34, of Chicopee, Massachusetts; Maj. Henry V. Ford, 32, of Richmond, Virginia.; Lt. Col. William A. McWhorter, 36, Dewey, Oklahoma; Maj. Harold S. Leffel, 33, Shawyer Mill, Virginia; Capt. Roger H. Blake, 30, of Miami, Florida, and Technical Sgt. Lyle C. Phillips, 31, of Brewton, Minnesota.

29 August
Boulton Paul P.120, VT951, first flown 6 August 1952, crashes this date on Salisbury Plain, Wilts, Great Britain after control failure, tail flutter. Pilot A.E. "Ben" Gunn ejects safely. Airframe had accumulated only ~eleven hours flying time. This is the first recorded loss of a delta-wing-design airframe.

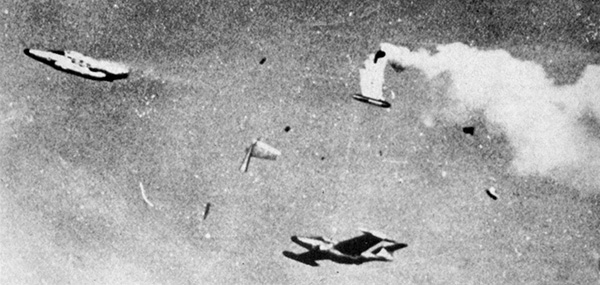
The Northrop F-89 Scorpion disintegrating at Detroit, 1952

30 August
As a pair of Northrop F-89 Scorpions of the 27th Fighter-Interceptor Squadron, Griffiss AFB, New York, perform a flypast, Northrop F-89C-30-NO, 51-5781, disintegrates in flight during a display at the International Aviation Exposition at Detroit-Wayne Major Airport, Detroit, Michigan, killing the Scorpion pilot, Maj. Donald E. Adams, a Korean war jet ace (6.5 kills), radar operator Captain Edward F. Kelly Jr., and one spectator. Cause was found to be from severe torsional aeroelastic problems that led to all F-89Cs being grounded and returned to the factory for wing structural redesign.

1 September
Several tornados sweep across Carswell AFB, Texas destroying Convair B-36B Peacemaker, 44-92051, and damaging 82 others of the 11th Bomb Group, 7th Bomb Wing, including ten at the Convair plant on the other side of the Fort Worth base. Gen. Curtis LeMay is forced to remove the 19th Air Division from the war plan, and the base went on an 84-hour work week until repairs were made. 26 B-36s were returned to Convair for repairs, and the last aircraft deemed repairable was airborne again on 11 May 1953.

6 September
Prototype de Havilland DH 110, WG236, flown by John Derry and flight observer Anthony Richards disintegrates at the Farnborough Air Show during pull out from high speed dive, killing both crew, debris, including engines, falls among crowd killing 29 spectators. Another source cites 28 dead. It was eventually established that disintegration had followed structural failure of the wing (possibly weakened earlier), almost certainly resulting from violent tail flutter.

10 September
A contractor-led team launches the first Boeing XF-99 Bomarc propulsion test vehicle from the Air Force Missile Test Center (AFMTC) Launch Complex 4 at Patrick AFB, Florida, on mission 621–1, but the test fails.

10 September
Six Grumman F9F-4 Panthers from VMF-115, part of a 21-plane flight returning from a mission, and diverting from K-3 to K-2, crash into Unman-san, a South Korean mountain, in foggy conditions, following lead aircraft navigational instrument failure. All six pilots killed. Lost are Maj. Raymond E. De Mers in BuNo 125168, 2d Lt. Richard L. Roth in BuNo 125170, 2d Lt. Carl R. La Fleur in BuNo 125173, Maj. Donald F. Givens in BuNo 125178, 1st Lt. Alvin R. Bourgeois in either BuNo 125181 or 125182, and 2d Lt. John W. Hill Jr. in BuNo 125223. Another source cites crash date of 11 September 1952.

11 September
Three Air Force crew and two civilians aboard a Beechcraft C-45F Expeditor on a routine flight from Bedford, Massachusetts, to Griffiss AFB, near Rome, New York, take to the silk and bail out at 2,500 feet at ~8:50 p.m. EST near Stittville after the aircraft's port engine loses power over central New York state ~50 miles from its destination. The lightened plane then flies onward on automatic pilot for more than an hour before crashing into Lake Ontario off of Oswego. A team of researchers from the Rochester area seeking historic shipwrecks in the lake's eastern end discover the "nearly intact" airframe in deep water on 27 June 2014 using side-scan sonar. The nose and twin fins are separated from the aircraft, but the rest is there. Pilot was Lt. Col. Charles Callahan, 32, of Monticello, Mississippi. All on board were attached to the Air Development Center at Griffiss AFB. The others on board were 1st Lt. Sam Sharf, of New York City; Lt. Col. G. S. Lam, of Newport News, Virginia; William Bethke, a civilian technician who lives near Rome; and Joseph M. Eannario, who lives in Rome.

1 October
U.S. Navy Grumman TBM-3S2 Avenger, BuNo 53439, of Air Anti Submarine Squadron-23, NAS San Diego, California, on night radar bombing training flight strikes Pacific Ocean surface at 110 knots (200 km/h) ~2 1/2 miles W of Point Loma. Both crew survive the accidental ditching, with pilot Lt. Ross C. Genz, USNR, rescued after four hours in a life raft by a civilian ship, but radarman AN Harold B. Tenney, USN, apparently drowns after evacuating the bomber and is never seen again. Wreckage discovered in 1992 during underwater survey.

8 October
A US Air Force Boeing B-29A-75-BN Superfortress, 44-62320, of the 1st Bomb Squadron, 9th Bomb Wing, 15th Air Force, Travis AFB, California, and Lockheed F-94A-5-LO, 49-2574, of the 318th Fighter-Interceptor Squadron, 4704th Defense Wing, McChord AFB, Washington, collide 1.5 miles N of Wilsonville, Oregon. The B-29 was making a simulated attack on Portland, Oregon, when it was struck by the F-94, making a simulated gunnery pass. Fighter landed at the Aurora State Airport, but the B-29 was lost with all 11 crew killed.

17 October
A North American F-51 Mustang of 113th Fighter-Interceptor Squadron exploded mid-air while on a routine flight in Belleville, Illinois over the home of the pilot's family, killing him.

23 October
SNCASE Languedoc F-RAPC of the Aéronavale crashes at Bonneuil-sur-Marne, Val-de-Marne, killing all eleven people on board.

26 October
Boeing WB-29 Superfortress, 44-69770, "Typhoon Goon II", (built as B-29-60-BW), of the 54th Weather Reconnaissance Squadron, Guam, is lost during a low-level penetration of Typhoon Wilma, a Category 5 storm, ~300 miles E of Leyte, Philippines, 10 crew killed. Lost are: Maj. Sterling L. Harrell, Capt. Donald M. Baird, Capt. Frank J. Pollack, 1st Lt. William D. Burchell, 1st Lt. Clifton R. Knickmeyer, M/Sgt. Edward H. Fontaine, A1C. Alton B. Brewton, A1C. William Colgan, A1C. Anthony J. Fasullo, and A3C. Rodney E. Verrill. No wreckage is found.

27 October
An Argentine Air Force Vickers VC.1 Viking T-64 crashed at Morón Air Base.

1 November
A USAF F-84G of 1211th Test Squadron piloted by Capt. Jimmy Priestly Robinson during atomic testing Operation Ivy is lost at sea and neither Robinson nor his aircraft are ever found.

15 November
A United States Air Force Fairchild C-119C-23-FA Flying Boxcar, 51-2570, c/n 10528, disappears on a flight from Elmendorf AFB to Kodiak Naval Air Station with 20 on board.

17 November
On the first launch attempt of the Martin B-61A Matador, GM-11042, the JATO booster malfunctions and penetrates the rocket which then crashes 400 feet from the launch point.

22 November

A United States Air Force Douglas C-124A Globemaster II, 51-0107, c/n 43441, on approach to Elmendorf AFB, Anchorage, Alaska, United States crashes into a remote glacier. The wreckage was found several days later on the South side of Mount Gannett. There were no survivors killing all 52 aboard. [41 Army and Air Force passengers and 11 crewmen.] 4th worst accident involving a Douglas C-124 This includes crashes as a result of criminal acts (shoot down, sabotage etc.) and does also include ground fatalities. 4th loss of a Douglas C-124. This is the 4th Douglas C-124 plane that was damaged beyond repair as result of an accident, a criminal act or a non-operational occurrence (hangar fire, hurricanes etc.) Debris from the crash was again found in June 2012. Bodies of 17 of the victims of this crash have been identified and returned to their families for burial with full military honors.

24 November
The second Boeing EB-50A Superfortress, 46-003, which spends most of its operational career used for testing, first by Boeing, and later by the Air Research and Development Command, and Air Materiel Command, primarily at the Aberdeen Proving Ground, is involved in a fatal accident at Aberdeen, Maryland, this date. Four crew killed when it crashes in the Bush River near Edgewood, Maryland.

1 December
A USAF Douglas C-47B-50-DK Skytrain, 45-1124, crashes in the San Bernardino Mountains with 13 aboard "during a lashing storm while ferrying personnel from its home base, Offutt Air Force Base, Omaha, Nebraska to March Air Force Base near here." Search parties fly out of Norton Air Force Base, San Bernardino, California, and search snow-covered 8,000-foot (2,400 m) level near Big Bear Lake, where a sheriff's deputy reported seeing a fire on Monday night. The aircraft was last heard from at 2151 hrs. PST. Wreck found on 22 December at ~11,485-foot (3,501 m) level of Mount San Gorgonio, buried twelve feet in the snow. All 13 killed while flying (KWF). One source gives crash date as 28 November.

14 December
A Royal Air Force Boeing Washington B.1, WF570, of 35 Squadron, RAF Marham, flies into ground five miles (8 km) ENE of Marham whilst attempting a radio compass let down in bad weather. Both pilots, the nav/plotter and the radio operato are killed, whilst the flight engineer and one of the air gunners suffer serious injuries.

20 December

A United States Air Force Douglas C-124A Globemaster II, 50-0100, c/n 43238, crashed on takeoff from Larson AFB, Moses Lake, Washington, United States. 115 on board (105 Passengers, 10 Crew); 87 killed (82 Passengers, 5 Crew). This was the highest confirmed death toll of any disaster in aviation history at the time. Cause attributed to maintenance error; the elevator and rudder gust locks were not disengaged before takeoff.

26 December
A U.S. Navy Martin PBM-5 Mariner aircraft of Patrol Squadron 47 (VP-47), based at MCAS Iwakuni, Japan, crashes in the Sea of Japan 50 miles E of Kosong, North Korea, whilst on anti-submarine patrol, killing ten members of the crew of fourteen. The Navy in Tokyo announces on 29 December that two bodies had been recovered, and that four injured crew were rescued by the destroyer USS Renshaw.

== 1953 ==
5 January
A Royal Air Force Boeing Washington B.1, WF553, of 15 Squadron, RAF Coningsby, crashes whilst attempting a Ground Controlled Approach at Coningsby in bad weather, impacting near Horncastle. Both pilots, the flight engineer, radio operator and nav/radar are killed, whilst the nav/plotter survives with serious injuries.

8 January
A Royal Air Force Boeing Washington B.1, WF502, of 90 Squadron, RAF Marham, crashes at Llanarmon, North Wales whilst on a simulated night radar bombing exercise. Dives into ground at high speed, all ten crew killed.

12 January
"An Eglin (AFB) North American F-86 Sabre crash landed on Range 51 injuring the pilot." Aircraft was North American F-86F-30-NA, 52-4306, of the 3200th Flight Test Squadron, 3200th Proof Test Group, piloted by Robert G. Loomis; suffered engine failure.

13 January
Strategic Air Command Boeing B-50D-125-BO Superfortress, 49–386, c/n 16162, of the 93d Bombardment Wing, Castle AFB, California, one of a flight of four on a routine navigational flight, spins down out of clouds at 1340 hrs. PT and crashes 13 miles (21 km) W of Gridley, California, killing all 12 on board. Witnesses said that the bomber appeared to lose power. "When we first saw the plane it was coming out of the clouds in a steep spin at about 2,000 feet," said John Cowan, manager of Grey Lodge Waterfowl refuge. "The pilot gave it full power several times, but he couldn't pull it out." Just before they hit the ground, the plane appeared to level out some, but it was too late. "They hit the ground with a tremendous thudding sound." Cowan, a flier himself, and a pilot of Navy planes during the war, could offer no explanation for the crash. "We could hear the pilot hit his engines before he dropped out of the clouds," Cowan said. A special investigations team was dispatched early today (14 January) from Wright-Patterson Air Force Base, Dayton, Ohio. Salvage, and additional recovery of bodies, waited on the arrival of a 92-foot (28 m) crane sent from McClellan Air Force Base, Sacramento. Gridley residents said the doomed plane "barely cleared treetops" while passing over the town seconds before the crash, but regained altitude momentarily. Eyewitnesses to the actual crash said the bomber came out of the clouds at 2,000 feet (610 m) in a spin. Many heard the pilot gunning his engines during the fall, and the plane appeared to level out slightly just before the impact half buried it in the mud of an open grain field on the Terrill Sartain property, two miles (3 km) W of the Butte-Colusa county line. Shortly before the crash the flight of four bombers were seen in formation over Oroville. Killed were T/Sgt. Curtis F. Duffy, 27, husband of Ruth A. Duffy, Atwater, California; T/Sgt. Bobby G. Theuret, 29, son of Mr. and Mrs. Harry D. Theuret, Box 413, Costa Mesa, California, and husband of Barbara L. Theuret, Atwater; M/Sgt. William H. Clarke, 32, husband, of Audrey W. Clark, Merced, California; M/Sgt. Wallace N. Schwart, 28, Maywood, Illinois. Those missing and presumed dead include Lt. Col. Gerald W. Fallon, 34, husband of Elaine K. Fallon, Merced; Maj. William P. McMillan, 37, husband of Greta A. McMillan, Atwater; Capt. William S. Raker, 27, husband of Lorraine G. Raker, Atwater; M/Sgt. Joe L. Bradshaw, 37, husband of Jessamine Bradshaw, Atwater; A.J. William B. Crutchfield, 27, husband of Della Ann Crutchfield, Atwater; A1C Charles W. Hesse, 21, Sauk Center, Minnesota; Capt. Edward Y. Williams, 33, Spokane, Washington; and 1st Lt. George D. Griffitts, 23, Hico, Texas.

15 January
Two RAF aircraft, Vickers Valetta, VX562, and an Avro Lancaster, TX270, collide over the Mediterranean Sea with 26 killed.

31 January
A USAF North American F-86F Sabre crashes in bad weather while on final approach to Truax Field, Wisconsin, killing the pilot Major Hampton E. Boggs a former Korean War pilot and second ranking ace with the 459th Fighter Squadron flying the Lockheed P-38 Lightning during the China-Burma-India campaign (1943–1945).

31 January
A Lockheed P2V-5 Neptune, BuNo 127751, c/n 426-5085, of VP-22 goes missing out of Naha Air Base, Okinawa. Subsequent search reveals the wreckage 45–50 miles from the base with 11 victims on a mountainside at the northeast end of Okinawa. Aircraft struck 1,200–1,300 foot cliff at the 1,000 foot level. Crew killed: Pilot: LT (jg) D. E. Russell, LT (jg) J. L. Kreeting, USN (co-pilot), ENS C. D. Oliver, USNR A (navigator), AD1 R. J. Helms (plane captain), AOAN N. J. Nellis (ordanceman), AOAN J. H. Franks (ordanceman), AL2 L. Baltzar (radioman), AL2 A. G. Sanderson (2nd radioman), ATAN G. A. Knochel (2nd radarman), AT2 J. D. Norris (radar observer), and AD3 K. E. Johnson (2nd mechanic).

7 February
"Operation Styleshow", simulated combat mission by 18 Convair B-36 Peacemakers of the 7th Bomb Wing, staging through Goose AFB, Labrador, from Carswell AFB, Texas, to RAF Fairford, ends badly for B-36H-25-CF, 51-5719, of the 492th Bomb Squadron, 7th BW. Weather had deteriorated when the flight arrived in the morning over Fairford. Undermanned and inexperienced GCA personnel led to delays while other B-36s landed. After two missed GCA approaches and extended holding, 5719 faced fuel exhaustion. Pilot Lt. Col. Herman F. Gerick, rather than risk the lives of his crew or those on the ground, orders bail out 22 miles NE of Fairford and aims bomber at open country. All crew parachute safely – sole injury is one breaks a leg upon landing. Unmanned B-36 flies 30 miles before breaking up and impacting at Nethermore Woods, Lacock, near Chippenham, Wiltshire, England. Gerick, the co-pilot George Morford, and crew members Royal Freeman, Edwin House and Doug Minor will all be KWF in the crash of B-36D 44-92071 on 11 December 1953. Other crew were William Minelli and Bill Plumb. No coverage was reported in the local Wiltshire Times, the sole mention being a letter published 14 February, berating the U.S. Air Force crew for abandoning the airframe to its fate, and inquiring, "I wonder whether any of our British boys would have done such a thing? Somehow, I don't think so."

27 February
A Lockheed P2V Neptune, transiting from Cecil Field, NAS Jacksonville, Florida, to Port Lyautey, French Morocco, suffers engine failure in mid-ocean, ditches near, and guided by, U.S. Coast Guard cutter USCGC Coos Bay (WAVP-376), 800 miles W of Bermuda. Lt. Cdr. J. R. Bird, of Jacksonville, puts the bomber down in the lee of the ship in a 30-mile-an-hour wind. Four crew are rescued from the water and six taken off a raft from the plane. None are injured, including Frederic M. Horn, of Galesburg, Illinois, an electronics man. The P2V apparently stayed aloft for two hours after the initial distress message was sent. The Coos Bay was heading for Bermuda to transfer the crew to the cutter Barataria. The Navy said that they would be taken to New York. where Third Naval District coordinated the rescue.

27 February
An engine on a Boeing B-29 Superfortress weather plane disintegrates over the Tokyo suburb of Tokorozawa and seven crew successfully bail out, the Air Force in Tokyo reports. "The crippled plane, on a routine training flight, presumably crashed in the Pacific ocean."

27 February
The Associated Press reports from Seoul that the Air Force announced the crash of a Douglas B-26 Invader shortly after takeoff from a South Korean air base today. Three airmen were killed and the pilot injured.

9 March
USMC Grumman F9F-4 Panther, BuNo 125199, 'WP 10', of VMF-223, piloted by Capt. William H. Bezzell, USMC, suffers apparent tailhook failure while coming aboard USS Bennington, operating off of Guantanamo Bay Naval Base during post-refit shakedown training, bounces into the air, sails through the nylon Davis safety net airborne, hits deck again and dives into the forward elevator well, landing on top of nose of another F9F-4 of the same unit on the lowered elevator. Quick reactions by hangar crew in flooding the area with foam and closing doors to the hangar bay averts disaster and no post-crash fire occurs. Pilot uninjured, and injuries to most of 40 crew involved are minor, but Airman Ricketts, who was underneath the Panther on the elevator, is seriously injured and is eventually discharged when his condition does not improve.

12 March
A RAF Avro Lincoln, RF531, 'C', of Central Gunnery School, is shot down 20 mi (32 km) NE of Lüneburg, Germany by a Soviet MiG-15 as it flies to Berlin on a training flight, resulting in the deaths of the seven crew members.

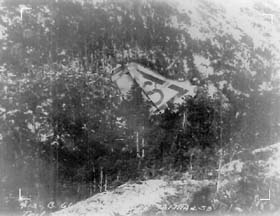
Official US Air Force accident incident photo of the 18 March 1953 RB-36H crash. The picture shows the detached remains of the fin and upper part of the rudder of the RB-36.

18 March
Brig Gen Richard E. Ellsworth, commander of the 28th Strategic Reconnaissance Wing, is killed in the crash of Convair RB-36H-25-CF Peacemaker, 51-13721, he was co-piloting on a 25-hour journey as part of a simulated combat mission flying from Lajes, Azores back to Rapid City Air Force Base, South Dakota. As part of the exercise, the bomber was observing radio silence and had switched off their radar guidance, flying via celestial navigation. They had planned to fly low over the ocean, steadily increasing to higher altitudes before reaching the mountainous countryside of Newfoundland. Late into the night, the aircraft struck bad weather and went off course, reaching Newfoundland 90 minutes earlier than planned. At 0410 hrs. at a hill near Burgoyne's Cove, inland from Nut Cove, Trinity Bay, Newfoundland, with sleet, fog, freezing drizzle, and visibility estimated at less than 1/8-mile (0.20 km), the plane struck an 896-foot (273 m) hill at 800 feet (240 m) with a ground speed of 202 knots (374 km/h). The aircraft's propellers severed the tops of pine trees while the plane's left wing hit the ground, tore off, and spilled fuel. The rest of the plane impacted some thousand feet further. The impact and subsequent fire from the plane's fuel tanks scorched an 8-foot-deep (2.4 m) trench in the countryside. Loggers on a nearby hill spotted the fireball and alerted rescuers, but all 23 on board were killed on impact. Much of the wreckage remains at the crash site. That same night, a Boeing SB-29-70-BW Superfortress, 44-69982, search and rescue plane of the 52d Air Rescue Squadron, 6th Air Rescue Group, based at Harmon Air Force Base, Newfoundland, was sent out to assist in search efforts. It disappeared shortly before landing, crashing into St. Georges Bay, a few miles from the runway, killing 11. Wreckage never found. In the aftermath of the B-36 crash, an accident investigation board recommended new procedures to scan more frequently for approaching high terrain and to climb to safer altitudes before approaching within 200 miles (320 km) of a water-land boundary. President Dwight Eisenhower personally went to the Rapid City base and re-named it Ellsworth Air Force Base, to honor the general

21 April
T396, the last Handley Page Halifax in RAF service, a Mk IX of No. 1 Parachute Training School, RAF Henlow is written off in an accident.

24 April
USAF Strategic Air Command experimental project MX-1018, Project Tom-Tom, an attempt to extend fighter escort for bombers on long-range missions by coupling a pair of Republic F-84s onto bomber wingtips, suffers setback when EF-84D, 48–641, loses control, rolls upside down, hits wing of Boeing ETB-29A-60-BN Superfortress, 44-62093, sending both aircraft down to crash in Peconic Bay, New York, killing all aboard both aircraft. The program is immediately cancelled.

May
An RCAF Avro Lancaster of No. 407 Squadron RCAF crashes into Iron Mountain, Oregon. "It is unclear why 407 Squadron was operating over northern Oregon at the time, but Iron Mountain is southwest of the Hanford nuclear production facility in Washington state. It is possible that the aircraft was engaged in sampling training during a controlled release of Hanford radioactive material, but since such activities were cloaked in extreme secrecy at the time, the reasons for the flight and crash must remain speculative."

11 May
First prototype of the Tupolev Tu-95 Bear, Tu-95/1, first flown 12 November 1952, crashes this date NE of Noginsk, Russia, during its 17th flight and burns due to an engine fire in the starboard inner turboprop. Engine falls off of wing, nine of twelve crew parachute to safety but three are killed, including test pilot Alexey Perelet.

12 May
Bell X-2, 46–675, exploded in belly of Boeing EB-50D Superfortress mothership during captive LOX topping-off test and was dropped into Lake Ontario. Bell test pilot Jean "Skip" Ziegler's body dropped with airframe and Bell flight engineer Frank Wolko is also apparently carried over the side in the explosion. Neither body recovered. The EB-50D, 48-096, limps into Niagara Falls Airport, New York – never flies again.

15 May
An errant United States Air Force Republic F-84E-30-RE Thunderjet, 51–628, of the 22d Fighter-Bomber Squadron, 36th Fighter-Bomber Group, collides with two USAF C-119 Flying Boxcars of the 10th Troop Carrier Squadron, 60th Troop Carrier Group, flying in formation near Weinheim, Germany, sending all three planes down in flames. Fairchild C-119C Flying Boxcar, 51-8235, was struck by the fighter, which then struck C-119C, 51-8241, three Flying Boxcar crew killed, three injured. F-84 pilot James W. Chilton parachutes to safety.

26 May
A Royal Canadian Air Force Avro Lancaster, KB-995, crashed into the east side of Oregon’s Iron Mountain. All 10 people on board were killed.

9 June
An Argentine Air Force Vickers VC.1 Viking T-6 crashed at Praderes, Buenos Aires, Argentina.

11 June
The second Gloster Javelin prototype, WD808, with modified wing, crashes after experiencing a deep stall (elevators masked from airflow by wings, making recovery impossible) on climb-out from RAF Moreton Valance, Gloucestershire, killing test pilot Lt. Peter G. Lawrence MBE RN, when he delays ejection too long whilst steering towards unpopulated ground, his chute having insufficient time to open. Airframe impacts at Ashton Court Park, Long Ashton, near Bristol, Somerset.

13 June
A McDonnell F2H-2 Banshee, BuNo 123333, suffers an engine fire while parked on the deck of the USS Lake Champlain (CVA-39) off the coast of Korea, but is doused quickly.

17 June
A McDonnell F2H-3 Banshee of VC-4 Det. 6 (?), landing aboard the USS Coral Sea, CVA-43, during Mediterranean cruise, misses all arresting wires, then bounces completely over the nylon Davis safety barrier. Aircraft shears port undercarriage leg off on a starter tractor and then crashes into a pair of Douglas AD Skyraiders spotted on the forward flight deck before continuing over the bow. Pilot Lt. (jg) Robert E. Berger, of Denver, Colorado, killed in the accident, posthumously receives the Navy and Marine Corps Medal which is presented to his widow in a ceremony at the Naval training center of the Denver Federal Center.

18 June

A United States Air Force Douglas C-124A Globemaster II, 51-0137, c/n 43471, crashes at Kodaira, Japan after engine failure on take-off at Tachikawa Air Force Base, Tokyo, Japan. 129 die, making this the deadliest recorded disaster in aviation history at the time.

21 June
Two crew of the 3200th Fighter Test Squadron, Air Proving Ground Command, Eglin AFB, Florida, are killed in a Lockheed F-94C-1-LO Starfire, 50-969, when it crashes at Fairfax Field, Kansas City, Kansas. Fighter had departed the airfield on a routine training mission for a flight to Scott AFB, Illinois, when the pilot attempted to return shortly after the 1330 hrs. CST take-off. Fighter struck a dike short of the runway, hitting ~10 feet (3.0 m) below the top, and caromed onto the runway. Radar operator was killed on impact and the pilot died later of injuries.

15 July
First of two Convair XP5Y-1s (and only one to fly), BuNo 121455, is lost on 42nd flight during high-speed testing by pilot Don Germeraad over the Pacific near San Diego, California. While operating at 115 percent of design limits under Navy contract, the elevator torque tube breaks, aircraft commences cycle of rollercoaster climbs and dives which continues for 25 minutes until control obviously being lost, all eleven on board go over the side and are rescued. Flying boat crashes into the ocean and sinks ~six miles off Point Loma, wreckage never recovered. A chase plane awaiting a Convair F2Y Sea Dart filmed the final minutes of the hair-raising flight, but it was classified secret and has probably never been released. Airframe had over 102 hours of flight time. When first flown on 18 April 1950, it was the first turboprop-powered flying boat to fly.

17 July
US Marine Corps Fairchild R4Q-2 Packet, BuNo 131663, c/n 10830, crashes in a wooded area N of Milton, Florida, shortly after take off from NAS Whiting Field, Florida, where it had made a refueling stop. Five of six crew, and 39 of 40 passengers are killed. The transport was one of 20 being used to take Naval Reserve Officer Training Corps midshipmen, college students, in their sophomore and junior years and from many states, from NAS Corpus Christi, Texas, to Chambers Field, NAS Norfolk, Virginia. All 46 passengers were ROTC members. "As part of their reserve work they are required to take six weeks summer training at naval installations in Corpus Christi and Norfolk. Altogether, 1,600 ROTC men are taking part in this summer's program, half of them at Corpus Christi and half at Norfolk. At the end of three weeks, the 800 at Norfolk and 800 at Corpus Christi swap bases for the final three weeks. The group which had stopped at Whiting was half of the 800 being flown to Norfolk. Rear Adm. J. P. Whitney, chief of Naval Air Basic Training, appointed a special board to investigate the crash." Most of the dead were students at the University of Oklahoma and Rice University, with one victim from the Georgia Institute of Technology.

30 July
A Sikorsky H-19 Chickasaw helicopter, 51-3896, crashed near O'Neill NB when a central rotor blade came loose during flight and struck the rear rotor. The entire crew of 6 was killed. The aircraft had flown cross-country from Bedford, Massachusetts, and was conducting high-altitude turbulence research. The aircraft carried Dr. Guenter Loeser, a German meteorological scientist, A2C Donald Eddy, A2C Francis "Jerry" Mapes, Capt Charles A. Johnson of San Gabriel, Calif., the co-pilot, Lt. Francis L. Gasque, of Conway, SC, and the crew chief as Sgt. Robert Ide of Scranton, PA.

6 August
Israeli Air Force de Havilland Mosquito FB.6 2113, (another source states that was an NF.30) disappeared in flight over the Mediterranean, Two crew missing, Uriel Ashel and Oded Shatil. Crashed into the sea at night.

6 August
The first attempted launch of a Northrop B-62 Snark at Cape Canaveral, Florida, fails when, after 15 seconds of flight, the drag chute deploys prematurely and the missile crashes.

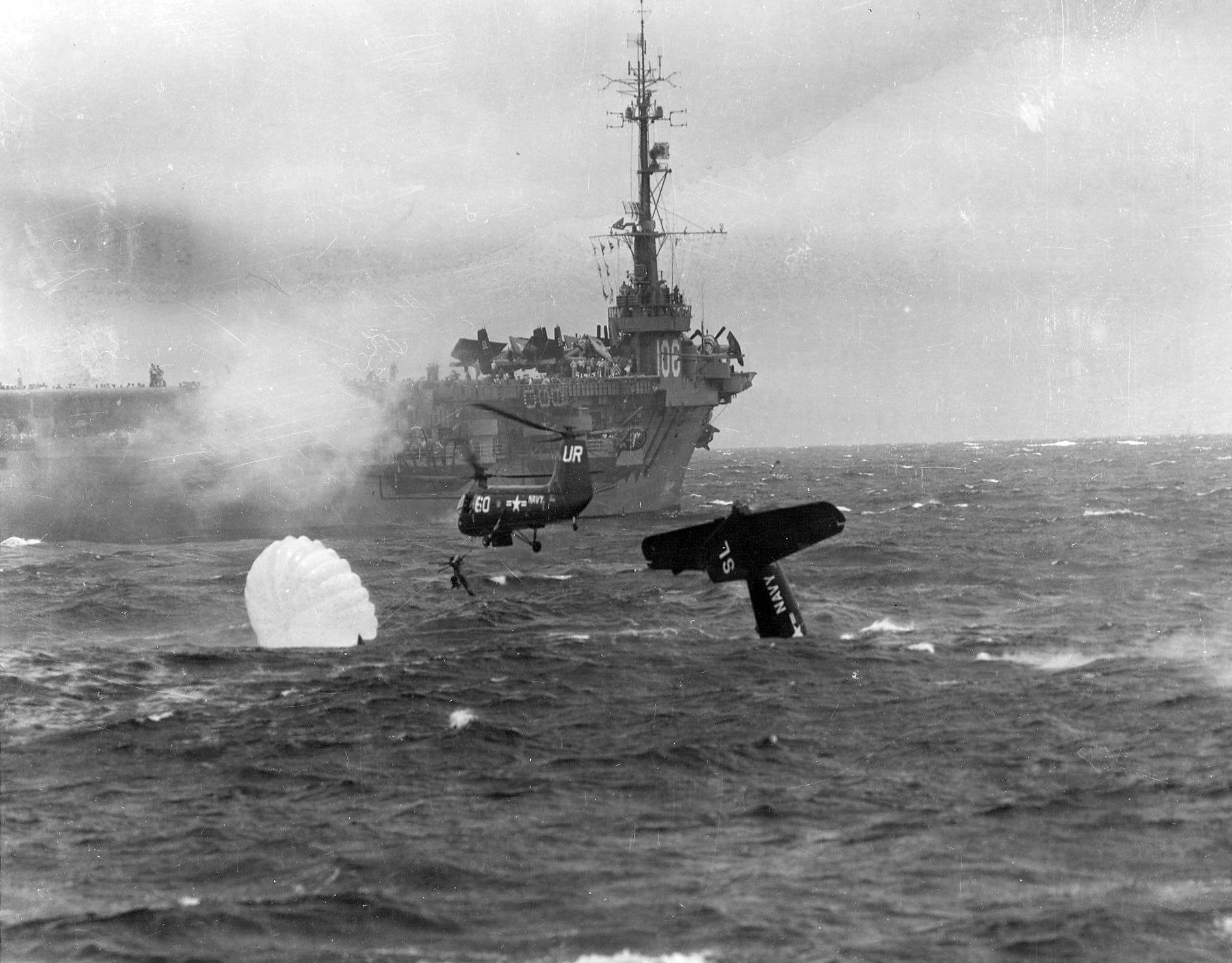
Recovery of a Grumman AF pilot from USS Block Island (CVE-106).

12 August
A US Navy Grumman AF-2 Guardian, 'SL', from Anti-submarine Squadron VS-22 crashes into the ocean immediately after launch from the escort carrier USS Block Island (CVE-106). The pilot, Ensign E.H. Barry, is recovered by a Piasecki HUP plane-guard helicopter.

23 August
First prototype Short SB.6 Seamew, XA209, flown by Shorts chief test pilot, New Zealand-born, ex-RNZAF, RAF, and ETPS-trained Squadron Leader Walter J. "Wally" Runciman, suffers heavy landing on its first flight, this date; damage takes three weeks to repair, but it is finished in time for the Farnborough air show.

26 August
U.S. Coast Guard Boeing PB-1G Flying Fortress, BuNo 77253, ex-44-85827, loses brakes while landing at NAS Sand Point, near Seattle, Washington, overruns runway, crushes nose as it ends up in Lake Washington. Retrieved and sold for salvage.

30 August
Second prototype SNCASO SO.9000 Trident I -002 makes first and last flight, crashing and being a total write-off.

5 September
"TOKYO (AP) – Wild mountain country in Western Japan Saturday cloaked the fate of a U.S. jet pilot, one of six forced to crash or bail out when a sudden violent storm hid their bases until their jets ran out of fuel. The pilot unaccounted for was flying one of five F86 Sabres Friday from Kisarazu maintenance base on the east side of Tokyo Bay to Tsuiki Air Base at Fukuoka, Kyushu's principal city. Two crash-landed at or near Tsuiki. One pilot parachuted into the Pacific off Shikoku Island and was rescued by a fisherman. Another parachuted on a housetop. The fifth pilot disappeared in an area somewhat resembling America's mountainous Olympic Peninsula country. At the same time that tragedy beset the Sabres, an F84 Thunderjet crash-landed near Itazuke Air Base near Fukuoka. The jet crashed into a barn, injuring the pilot. No names were released."

9 September
A USAF Lockheed T-33A Shooting Star attempting a landing at San Fernando Valley Airport comes down a half mile short, sweeps over an open lot and under powerlines, bounces on a street, and crashes into the front door of the John T. Chandler home in Van Nuys, California. The trainer tears through the center of the home, leaving a wing in the living room and a tank embedded in the kitchen wall, and comes to rest in the backyard. There is no fire. Mrs. Phyllis O'Kray, 48, Chandler's mother-in-law, is killed while sleeping in the living room. Chandler, 35, and his wife Helen, 28, in a corner bedroom, suffer only shock. Mrs. O'Kray was buried in the debris, firemen report. The jet narrowly misses the Chandler's daughter, Candee, 6, and a neighbor boy, Gary Friay, 8, playing in the backyard. The plane's crew, Capt. Samuel Fast, 34, of San Fernando, the pilot, and Capt. Howard Rhodes, 30, Santa Monica, step from the fuselage unaided with only minor cuts and bruises. "The plane was on a routine acceptance test flight when landing gear trouble was reported, the CAA said." On Friday 11 September, nearly 200 women and children picket the Lockheed assembly plant at the Lockheed Air Terminal, to protest the testing of jet planes in the populous area. The Associated Press reports the location as the "San Fernando Valley Airport".

9 September
A U.S. Navy Douglas AD-4 Skyraider crashes, explodes on impact, and burns on the middle of Owens Dry Lake near Olancha, ~60 miles N of Naval Ordnance Test Station Inyokern. The bodies of three crew were retrieved by afternoon. The bomber was on a routine training mission out of NAS North Island, California, but San Diego officials refused to identify the victims pending notification of the next of kin, however did say that one man was a local resident while two were out-of-state residents. Wreckage was strewn over a 200-yard radius. The pilot's body was recognizable but the two crew bodies were burned beyond recognition, security investigators from the Inyokern station said. "Occupants of a companion plane on the flight saw the plane crash and reported it to the Inyokern station, which dispatched a rescue team and security officers. The accident occurred at 11:38 a.m. Included in the security and rescue groups were Jack Leslie and Val Cummings, security policemen; Lt. Allen W. Lee, assistant security officer; Lt. Brooke Montgomery, flight officer; Edward Stanton, chief of the identification branch; Dr. Evans Spear, assistant medical officer; and Stanley Jackson, hospital corpsman." The Navy identified the dead the following day as: Ens. A. R. Stickney, son of Mr. and Mrs. Charles E. Stickney, North Hollywood; John C. Peckenpaugh, AOM 3-c, son of Robert A. Peckenpaugh, Hardinsburg, Kentucky; and Paul D. Pock, son of Mr. and Mrs. Paul C. Pock, Altamont, Illinois.

9 September
"MERCED (AP) – A two-engine Navy plane from Monterey crashed near Castle Air Force Base Wednesday and was demolished by fire. Two of the four crewmen received major injuries, All four received second degree burns."

11 September
One North American F-86D Sabre crashes, and another unaccounted for after a flight of four 62d Fighter-Interceptor Squadron fighters gets separated during a wind and rain storm over Northern Illinois on Friday night. Maj. Robert L. Thomas, at O'Hare Air Reserve Station, said that two aircraft apparently lost their bearings. One came down on a farm near the farm community of Wilton Center, ~35 miles SW of Chicago, the pilot safe after bailing out at 10,000 feet. "The second plane was reported to have crashed in Lake Michigan adjacent to Chicago, but Thomas said that report later was found incorrect."

19 September
RCAF Squadron Leader Ray Greene is killed when his F-86 Sabre comes out of a loop in a steep dive before 60,000 National Air Show spectators at Toronto, skips along on the surface of Lake Ontario for a few hundred feet, then explodes into a ball of flame, the blast of which can be heard a mile away. The pilot had planned to close his display with a sonic boom but was killed before that.

19 September
A WB-29 Superfortress, en route to Bermuda from Hunter AFB, Georgia. suffers an engine fire, drops the engine from the wing, then suffers collapse of the wing. Nine bail out and are rescued 150 miles off Charleston, South Carolina. The Coast Guard said there was little hope for the seven who were still on board when the plane hit the sea. The Coast Guard said that the steamship Nassau picked up four survivors, and the S.S. Seatrain Georgia, a railroad car-carrying vessel, rescued three more. Two other men found floating in lifejackets were picked up by unidentified surface craft. The first four recovered were on rafts, but the others spent the night in the water in lifejackets although they were able to climb onto rafts dropped to them before rescue. Flares visible on a clear night led search planes to where the survivors were clustered. One survivor was badly burned, Hunter AFB reported. Three were in good condition while the condition of the others was not known. A second disaster was averted when an Air Force rescue amphibian (SA-16 ?) tore off a float while attempting to land to pick up survivors. Its crew off nine was also fished up by the SS Nassau.

25 September
The last Boeing B-29 Superfortress to be delivered, Boeing-Wichita-built B-29-100-BW, 45-21872, in September 1945, converted to a WB-29, was destroyed in a crash this date near Eielson AFB, Alaska, while assigned to the 58th Strategic Reconnaissance Squadron (Medium), Weather.

1 October
A USAF North American TB-25J, 44-86779A, built as a B-25J-30/32-NC, (Joe Baugher states that it was modified and redesignated to TB-25N status, but the official accident report refers to it as a TB-25J) attached to Andrews AFB, Maryland, crashes in fog and heavy overcast into the forested pinnacle of historic Pine Mountain, striking Dowdell's Knob at ~2130 hrs., near Warm Springs in western Georgia, killing five of six on board, said spokesmen at Lawson AFB. The bomber struck the 1,395-foot peak at the 1,340 foot level. It had departed from Eglin AFB, Florida, at 1930 hrs. for Andrews AFB. Two Eglin airmen were among those KWF. The sole survivor, Richard Kendall Schmidt, 19, of Rumson, New Jersey, a Navy fireman assigned to the crash crew at NAS Whiting Field, Florida, who had hitch-hiked a ride on the aircraft, was found by two farmers who heard the crash and hiked to the spot from their mountainside homes "and found the sailor shouting for help as he lay in the midst of scattered wreckage and mutilated bodies. They said [that] they found a second man alive but base officials said [that] he died before he could be given medical attention." First on the scene was Lee Wadsworth, of Manchester, Georgia, who, while visiting his father-in-law, Homer G. Swan, in Pine Mountain Valley, had heard and seen the Mitchell in level flight at very low altitude AGL on an easterly course moments before impact at ~2130 hrs. Immediately following the crash, Wadsworth, Swan, and Wadsworth's brother-in-law, Billy Colquitt, drove a truck to the knob, arriving there at 2145 hrs. After a short search, they smelled gasoline and heard the cries for help from Schmidt. They proceeded to render aid for two and a half hours until the first medical help arrived, in the person of Dr. Bates from Pine Mountain Valley. Schmidt was loaded into Dr. Bates' automobile and was driven east towards Columbus to meet the military ambulance dispatched from Martin Army hospital at Fort Benning. The semi-conscious man had died of his injuries some 35 minutes after the first responders got to him. The Air Police, and Sheriff and Coroner for Harris County arrived at ~0030 hrs., 2 October. Tom Baxley, one of the farmers, said that the bodies of the dead, most of them torn by the collision, were flung about among the pine trees, and bits of the plane were hurled over a wide area. Schmidt was hospitalized with a possible hip fracture and cuts. Among the fatalities were two airmen assigned to Eglin AFB who had also hitch-hiked a ride and were on their way home on leave. The impact location is on the site of the proposed $40,000,000 Hall of History to mark a scenic point frequented by the late President Franklin D. Roosevelt. Killed were Capt. Stephen A. Clisham, pilot; Capt. Virgil G. Harris, co-pilot; T/Sgt. Othelier B. Hoke, flight engineer; and passengers A3C Robert W. Davidson, and A2C Benny J. Shepard. Shepard, riding in the waist section aft the bomb bay, as was Schmidt, survived the initial impact and was thrown from the wreckage, but died of his severe injuries before assistance arrived.
This accident was added to the Wikipedia article on 12 June 2012. Exactly one month later, it was discovered by board members of the Pine Mountain Trail Association at the F. D. Roosevelt State Park, who had been seeking details of the 1953 accident. Based on information in this article, they were able to locate survivor Richard Schmidt within a day, and on the Veterans Day weekend, 10 November 2012, he and Monica Clisham Coffey, the daughter of the B-25's pilot, unveiled a plaque and a memorial rock at Dowdell Knob to those who died in the crash, and in Schmidt's honor. Schmidt was also reunited with 84-year-old Robert Lee Wadsworth of nearby Manchester, and 88-year-old Billy Colquitt, "the minister who accompanied Wadsworth up the mountain and prayed with Airman 2nd Class Benny J. Shepard as he drew his dying breaths."

1 October
"An Air Force Sabre jet plane, its electric firing device out of order, sprayed this western Pennsylvania town (Farrell, Pennsylvania) with machine gun bullets for several terror-filled seconds. The whining .50 caliber slugs riddled 12 autos, setting two afire and tore into nearly 30 buildings and homes yesterday (1 October). No one was hurt although several persons had narrow escapes. 'Something happened to one of its machine guns,' Police Chief John J. Stosito said after a conference with Maj. A. F. Martin Jr. of the Vienna Air Force Base near Warren, Ohio. The plane was on a routine flight from the base. Name of the pilot was withheld. Witnesses said [that] the craft was several thousand feet up as it zoomed over the city. Martin, who came here to conduct an investigation, said [that] there is "only about one chance in a million" of such a thing happening and added [that] the Air Force would pay all damages."

7 October
Second Lt. G. A. Thomas, of the 18th Fighter-Interceptor Squadron, based at Saint Paul, Minnesota, departs from Yuma, Arizona, on a gunnery training flight, in an F-86A Sabre, but has an emergency and attempts to bail out. The pilot's body is found Wednesday 7 October, 25 miles S of the Mexican-American border. March AFB officials said that the downed fighter was located on Thursday, four miles N of the border.

8 October
"Three Air Force fliers died in the blazing wreckage of their jet bomber which crashed Thursday at 4:55 p.m., 15 miles southeast of Riverside while on a test flight. An Air Force spokesman said the plane was a jet B45 Tornado, stationed temporarily at Norton Air Force Base, San Bernardino, while undergoing repairs. He said the plane left Norton on a routine test flight at 4:18 p.m., carrying a crew consisting of a major and two first lieutenants. According to the Air Force spokesmen, the three officers were making final test runs with the plane before returning to their home base, which was unknown at the time. Names of the fliers are being withheld pending notification of relatives. The bodies were taken to Preston Funeral Home in Riverside." At 4:56 p.m., the Riverside sheriff's office received a call from an unidentified woman that a plane had crashed about seven miles SE of March Air Force Base, near Lakewood. The victims' bodies were badly charred as the wreckage burned for four hours. Reports that the plane exploded in air were disbelieved by investigators as the wreckage was concentrated in a small area. A board of Air Force officers will be appointed to investigate the accident, said Floyd K. Smith, civilian public information officer at Norton.

8 October
"PALM SPRINGS – Disaster to an Air Force C-47 and the plane's load of 28 was narrowly averted in Palm Springs. Merton Haskell, who with his brother Malcolm operates the Palm Springs Municipal Airport, said the carrier plane was reported in difficulties around 2 a.m. by the Civil Aeronautics Authority Jacqueline Cochran Regional Airport at Thermal, California, with one motor out of commission. Haskell commented, "we can thank the good Lord we have been keeping the lights on all night. The situation could have been bad." The plane's origin and destination have not been revealed, but it was reported that the passengers aboard were all Air Force jet pilots being transferred from one base to another. A crash landing was expected and police emergency patrol cars and fire station equipment rushed to the scene while Wiefels and Sons Palm Springs ambulance stood by. While spectators watched tensely, the pilot of the C-47 succeeded in making his emergency landing with only one motor of the twin-engine craft in operation."

11 October
U.S. Air Force spokesmen at Hamilton AFB, California, report that an Air Force Reserve pilot, 1st Lt. Frederick H. Reed, 32, Berkeley, California, was killed when his F-51 Mustang crashed into San Pablo Bay, a half mile from the base.

13 October
Second of two Bell X-5 swing-wing testbeds, 50-1839, gets into irrecoverable spin condition at Edwards AFB, California during aggravated stall test, crashes in desert, killing test pilot Maj. Raymond Popson, USAF, on his first flight in the type. The plane failed to recover from a spin at 60° sweepback.
Boeing B-47B-30-BW Stratojet, 51-2096, of the 33d Bomb Squadron, 22d Bomb Wing, crashes and explodes at 1925 hrs., shortly after takeoff from March Air Force Base, California, during a touch-and-go, killing three crew. The crash scatters wreckage over five acres of open brushland near Alessandro Boulevard and Highway 395 in the Moreno Valley, two miles W of the base. Aircraft commander was Capt. Byron M. Steel. Two other victims were Capt. Charles W. Brosius, of the 33d BS, 22d BW, husband of Marian B. Brosius, 6714 Palm Avenue, Riverside, and father of son Peter Charles, 1, and daughter Gretchen, 2 months; and Capt. Earl F. Poytress, Headquarters, 12th Air Division, husband of Barbara B. Poytress, 4583 Gardena Drive, Riverside, and father of daughter, Barbara Katherine, 3½. This was the first loss of a March B-47 since they arrived at the base on 30 January 1953. On 17 October, a spokesman for the Aircraft Accident Investigation Board asked for any eye-witnesses to the bomber in flight before the crash to please contact the Director of Operations, 12th Air Division, March AFB.

14 October
The nose gear of the XF-92 collapses, ending use by NACA.

17 October
Richart R. Galt, pilot of a Republic F-84F-1-RE Thunderstreak, 51-1354, is killed in an accident at Eglin Air Force Base, Florida.

18 October
U.S. Navy Lockheed P2V Neptune, BuNo 124901, of VP-18, crashes into the sea nine miles off Iceland with nine crew aboard. Hours later the Icelandic Life Saving Association says that only bits of wreckage floated at the site. A search, which continues through at least 19 October involves American planes and surface ships, a Royal Navy vessel, and Iceland Coast Guard vessels.

19 October
"HAMILTON, Bermuda (AP) – A U.S. Navy two-engined patrol bomber from Quonset Point, R.I., with ten crewmen aboard crashed with a terrific explosion in St. Georges Harbor [sic] Monday night. The Navy said six of the crewmen were rescued and taken to a hospital at the U.S. Air Force's Kindley Field. The plane was on a training flight, and intended to remain over night at Kindley Field before proceeding to San Juan, Puerto Rico. Eyewitnesses said the plane passed over Kindley with its right engine ablaze. They said the pilot pulled up, and was apparently trying to gain altitude when the plane stalled and crashed tail first."

20 October
Northrop YF-89D Scorpion, 49-2463, crashes at Edwards AFB, California, killing Northrop test pilot Walter P. Jones and Northrop radar operator Jack Collingsworth.

22 October
The 85th Fighter-Interceptor Squadron, Scott AFB, Illinois, suffers its first fatal North American F-86D Sabre loss when Maj. Yancy Williams crashes after takeoff from Runway 14 in F-86D-20-NA, 51-3029. Williams attempts to turn to the northwest, overshoots the approach to Runway 36, and then attempts a landing in a cornfield west of the base. He almost made it, but the Sabre strikes an electric transformer pole and explodes. The accident investigation shows that the Sabre had a hydraulic elevator control lock due to a misconnecting of hydraulic lines. Williams had been the squadron Material Officer.

26 October
A Douglas B-26 Invader target-towing plane on a gunnery training mission crashes at Indian Springs AFB, Nevada, killing the pilot and two crewmen. The Invader was based at Nellis AFB, Nevada. The victims names were withheld pending notification of next of kin.

2 November
First prototype Convair YF-102 Delta Dagger, 52-7994, suffers engine failure due to fuel injection system problem during test flight, lands wheels up, severely injuring pilot Richard L. Johnson, airframe written off.

8 November
Eight U.S. Marine Corps pilots avoid disaster when their fighters run low on fuel during a flight from Puerto Rico to a Marine Corps base near Miami, Florida. Three pilots, Capt. William H. Johnson, of Miami, Lt. Thomas D. White, of Murfreesboro, Tennessee, and Lt. Forest G. Dawson, of Tucson, Arizona, are forced to ditch in the ocean due to fuel exhaustion but are rescued by nearby ships in a short time. Five other planes are forced down at Homestead AFB, Florida, S of Miami, where one, flown by Capt. Donald Edwards, of Opa-locka, Florida, overshoots the field, ending up in a canal.

17 November
USAF Fairchild C-119F-KM Flying Boxcar, 51-8163, crashed at Fort Bragg, North Carolina, during a joint airborne operation. One of 12 C-119s on a troop drop, it lost an engine, dropped out of formation, hit and killed ten troopers in their chutes that had been dropped from other aircraft, that in addition to four crew members and one medical officer that went down with the plane.

23 November
USAF pilot 1st Lt. Felix Moncla and radar operator 2nd Lt. Robert L. Wilson take off in Northrop F-89C-40-NO Scorpion, 51-5853A, from Kinross Air Force Base, Kincheloe, Michigan, investigating an unusual target on radar operators. Wilson had problems tracking the object on the Scorpion's radar, so ground radar operators gave Moncla directions towards the object as he flew. Flying at some 500 miles per hour, Moncla eventually closed in on the object at about 8000 feet in altitude. Ground radar showed both the unidentified craft and the Scorpion suddenly disappearing from screen after intersecting. It is presumed the Scorpion crashed into Lake Superior, though no confirmed traces of the craft or Moncla and Wilson have been found.

24 November
A USAF North American F-86D Sabre crashes near Marianna, Florida, this date. The pilot ejects but is killed when his chute fails to deploy, his fighter coming down ~10 miles N of Graham Air Base. Col. Lewis H. Norley, commanding officer of the base, said that due to "unknown circumstances" the chute failed to function. Rescue planes from Maxwell Field at Montgomery, Alabama, and Tyndall Air Force Base, Panama City, Florida, discovered the pilot's body. Norley said that the pilot's identity will not be released until notification of the next of kin.

28 November
The first aircraft accident since arrival of the 463d Troop Carrier Wing at Ardmore Air Force Base, Oklahoma, occurred early Saturday morning, this date. Captain Francis N. Satterlee, Public Information Officer, and three passengers received various minor injuries as Beechcraft AT-11, 42-36830, went out of control as it became airborne, crashing 75 yards off the runway. "Captain Satterlee, pilot, was the most seriously injured of those aboard, receiving a compound fracture of the left leg below the knee plus lacerations of the right leg, right arm and face. The passengers included Lt. James R. Quiggle of the base legal department; A2/c Carl L. Taylor, crew chief of the aircraft, Headquarters Squadron, 463rd Air Base Group and Pvt. James R. Carver, U. S. Army, stationed at Ft. Lewis, Washington. The aircraft was headed for Fort Sill, Lawton, Oklahoma. Pvt. Carver, on leave at Ardmore, his hometown, was hoping to catch a military aircraft flight from Lawton to McChord Air Force Base, a short distance north of Ft. Lewis. Lt. Quiggle, Airman Taylor and Pvt. Carver received minor injuries not requiring hospitalization and received first aid at the base hospital. It was not in full operation at the time and Satterlee, with serious injuries, was transported to the Ardmore Sanitarium and Hospital where he stayed until he returned to duty."

30 November
A USAF C-119 Flying Boxcar crashes in flames while on approach to Orly Airport, Paris, France, killing all six crew. "French officials said the plane appeared to explode in air moments after it had been given a clearance for its approach to the field. They said [that] six bodies had been recovered from the wreckage. Air Force sources said the plane was manned by a ferry crew from Dover Field, Del. The bodies of five men were pulled from the charred wreckage. A sixth crewmen was found dead in a clump of trees after he had tried unsuccessfully to bail out from about 700 feet. His partially-opened parachute was tangled in branches 40 yards from the crash site."

30 November
USAF Lt. Ben E. Short, of Fontana, California, steps out of his burning North American F-86D-35-NA Sabre, 51-6172, and parachutes safely near Courtland, California, while on a flight out of Hamilton AFB, California. The burning plane lands in a field near Dixon, 20 miles from where the pilot descends. "Short, who was uninjured, telephoned his base from a farm house and was returned to Hamilton Field by helicopter an hour later." The accident occurred at 1000 hrs. A helicopter of the 41st Air Rescue Squadron flew him back to base. His F-86 crashed 35 miles E of Travis AFB.

1 December
A Navy trainer and an Air Force Douglas C-54 Skymaster hospital plane collide over the San Joaquin Delta but both make safe landings although badly damaged. The Navy men, logging flying time for credits, were Lt. J. L. Scoggins, pilot, and Lt. R. Taylor, of Berkeley. They recovered to NAS Alameda. The damaged C-54, which was believed to be en route to Kelly Field. Texas, was escorted back to its base at Travis AFB by a plane of the 41st Air Rescue Squadron, from Hamilton AFB. The C-54 pilot dealt with sticking landing gear but finally got it extended for a safe landing. It was not known how many were aboard the transport. The collision took place at 6,000 feet, between Stockton and Sacramento.

3 December
Air Force cadet Orrin W. Vail, 21, Riverside, California, is killed when his Lockheed T-33A Shooting Star crashes five miles from James Connally Air Force Base, Waco, Texas.

3 December
Boeing B-47E-60-BW Stratojet, 51-2440, of the 303rd Bomb Wing, on a training flight explodes in flight late Thursday and crashes into mountainous terrain NE of Tucson, Arizona. Officials at Davis-Monthan AFB identify the four dead as: Lt. Col. Douglas H. Bratcher, Dallas, Texas; Maj. Heyward W. McEver, Teaneck, New Jersey; Capt. Jesse G. Williams, Kenedy, Texas, all pilots; and A1C William L. Child, Nevada, Iowa, a crew chief. A ground crew dispatched to the scene recovered all four bodies from the blackened wreckage.

4 December
"SAN DIEGO (AP) – Death of Lt. Dean Converse of Long Beach, in the crash of his A2F Grumman Guardian [sic] plane 50 miles off Long Beach was announced by Pacific Fleet air headquarters here Friday."

4 December
"CHERRY POINT N.C. (AP) – A search for a jet training plane with two pilots aboard uncovered no clues Sunday, a Cherry Point Marine spokesman reported. The plane, a silver-colored trainer, has been missing since Friday. The Cherry Point public information office said Saturday the pilots were 1st Lt. Duke Williams Jr., 27, of Yazoo City, Miss., a former prisoner of the Chinese Communists in Korea, and Capt. John H. Barclay, 34, of Santa Monica, Calif."

5 December
"LAWRENCEVILLE, Ga. (AP) – Four Air National Guard Thunderjet pilots making a weekend instrument flight crashed to their deaths near here Saturday night. Officials at Dobbins Air Force Base in nearby Marietta said the F84s were returning from Miami and preparing to land when they fell from about 11,500 feet. One of the falling Thunderjets struck and demolished a small unoccupied house. The other three fighters fell nearby. All four pilots were members of the 116th Fighter Bomber Wing, Georgia National Guard. They were identified as: Capt. Idon M. Hodge Jr., 30, of Atlanta, the flight leader. 1st Lt. Elwood C. Kent, 28, of East Point, Ga. 1st Lt. Samuel P. Dixon, of Chamblee, Ga. 2nd Lt. William A. Tennent, 25, of Atlanta. Maj. W. J. Gay, of the Dobbins base operations office said Capt. Hodge radioed the Atlanta Naval Air Station, a checkpoint for planes landing at Dobbins, that the formation was starting its descent from 27,000 feet and would report again at 11,500. The fliers were not heard from again. Gay said the crash occurred about 25 miles northeast of Atlanta. The planes fell about four miles west of Lawrenceville. Dobbins officials said all the men were experienced jet pilots and they knew of no reason for the crashes. An investigation is under way. Three of the pilots – Kent, Dixon and Tennent – made up a stunt team specializing in close formation and acrobatic flying. Hodge and Kent were veterans of World War II and Hodge was a combat pilot in Korea."

11 December
A USAF Convair B-36D Peacemaker, 44-92071, upgraded from a B-36B-5-CF, crashed into the Franklin Mountains in El Paso, Texas, at 14:37 MST (2137 GMT), during conditions of light snow and low ceilings. The crash report points to pilot error as the primary cause, but confusing instructions from GCA might also have contributed. All eight of the crew were killed: Lt. Col. Herman Gerick, Aircraft Commander; Major George C. Morford, Pilot; Major Douglas P. Miner, Navigator; 1st Lt. Cary B. Fant, Flight Engineer; M Sgt Royal Freeman, Radio Operator; A/1c Edwin D. Howe, Gunner; A/2c Frank Silvestri, Gunner; 1st Lt James M. Harvey Jr., 492nd Bomb Squadron Staff Flight Engineer. Also killed was a passenger 1st Sgt Dewey Taliaferro. Lt. Col. Herman Gerick, Major Douglas P. Miner and A/2c Frank Silvestri had parachuted to safety in the 7 February 1953 missed-approaches crash of B-36H-25-CF, 51-5719, in the Nethermore Woods of Wiltshire County, England, UK.

14 December
The crash of a Northrop F-89 Scorpion shortly after takeoff from Ontario International Airport, Ontario, California, kills the Northrop test pilot instantly and fatally injures the radar intercept officer.

16 December
A U.S. Navy Consolidated PB4Y-2S Privateer, BuNo 59716, of VW-3, COMFAIRGUAM, NAS Agana, Guam, makes a low-level (200–300 feet) penetration into the eye of Super Typhoon Doris, but while radioing a report at 2245 hours Zulu, the transmission is interrupted and attempts to reach the operator fail. A nine-day search turns up no trace of the aircraft or its nine crew: Pilot J. W. Newhall, 39; Co-pilot S. B. Marsden, 29; Lt. Cmdr. D. Zimmerman Jr., 35; Ltjg. F. Troescher Jr., 26; AL1 F. R. Barnett, 26; AD1 J. N. Clark, 32; AD3 E. L. Myer, 20; AL2 N. J. Stephens, 23; and AO3 A. J. Stott, 23.

17 December
A USAF Boeing B-29MR Superfortress, 44-87741, built as a B-29-90-BW, making an emergency landing at Andersen AFB, Guam, fails to reach the runway and crashes into an officers housing area at the base, demolishing ten homes and damaging three more. Nine of sixteen crew were killed, as were seven on the ground – an officer, his wife, and five children. This aircraft had been searching for the PB4Y-2S lost on 16 December in Typhoon Doris when it suffered an engine failure.

17 December
A United Press report out of Reykjavík, Iceland, stated that a Lockheed P2V Neptune with nine crew aboard was reported missing and presumed down in the stormy North Atlantic this date. Wreckage of the patrol bomber was sighted on Myrdalsjokull Glacier with at least three survivors on 18 December. The plane had departed from Keflavik Airport. The 53d Air Rescue Squadron flies in an Icelandic ground rescue party, including expert skiers, to an airfield at the foot of the glacier. The wreckage was at the 4,000-foot level. Efforts to reach the crash site are hampered for several days by blizzards and high winds. When the site is reached on 21 December, all nine crew are dead and supplies dropped within 100 yards of the wreckage four days before are untouched.

18 December
USAF Boeing TB-29 Superfortress, formerly Silverplate Boeing B-29-55-MO, 44-86382, of the 7th Radar Calibration Squadron, Sioux City Air Force Base, Iowa, destroyed by post-crash fire when pilot and co-pilot mistake Ogden Municipal Airport, Utah, for nearby Hill Air Force Base, put down on much shorter runway, overrun threshold, bounce across deep ditch, where it loses a wing and part of the undercarriage, a 10-foot-wide (3.0 m) canal, crosses a state highway, ground-loops, and comes to rest in pieces, followed by immediate fire as the shattered landing gear puncture fuel tanks. One fatality on crew, Capt. B. D. Wilson, 31, Chester, Pennsylvania, the co-pilot; two others injured. Pilot Maj. James Gewrick sustains severe cuts. "The survivors, in addition to Gewrick, were navigator Capt. W.D. Spicer, crew chief M. Sgt. G. L. Easterbrook, T. Sgt. W. E. Cracup, and S. Sgt. D. T. Price, radio operator Sgt. V. A. Clegg and J. L. Cater, a sailor who had hitched a ride from Kansas. Home towns of the men, except for Carter who is from Nephi, Utah, were not announced immediately."

18 December
A North American F-86F Sabre, on its delivery flight, crashes on takeoff at Los Angeles International Airport when the pilot fails to get fully airborne. It crashes through a fence and dissolves into "a flash of flame". Officials at North American Aviation, Inc. said that the jet had been accepted by the Air Force and was on its delivery flight. The pilot was identified as 1st Lt. Fred L. Hughes, 25, whose widow Wanda and young son Randal live in a trailer court near Nellis Air Force Base, Las Vegas. F-86F-30-NA Sabre, 52-5128, written off.

19 December
The U.S. Air Force suffers its third B-29 loss in three days, and second in the Pacific, when a search and rescue plane, returning from a mission with one engine out, aborts one landing attempt, only to drag a wingtip on the second try, resulting in the bomber cartwheeling and exploding N of Nagoya. Two crew die, and six injured, three seriously, in the Saturday night crash.

20 December
A U.S. Navy Douglas R4D-8 Skytrain, BuNo 17179, c/n 43346 (converted from ex-USAAF C-47A-15-DK, 42-108892, c/n 12768), from NAS Agana, Guam, searching for the Navy PB4Y-2S lost 16 December in Typhoon Doris, crashes in the cone of an extinct 3,166-foot-tall volcano on Agrihan Island in the Northern Marianas, killing all ten on board. The aircraft was last reported seen at 1000 hrs. in the Pagan Island area, N of Guam.

21 December
"HONG KONG (AP) – A United States Navy plane on a holiday trip crashed and burned at Hong Kong's Airport Tuesday but most and probably all aboard were saved. A quick check among survivors indicated there were 14 aboard and all had escaped."

22 December
Pilot on a routine training mission from Eglin Air Force Base survives a crash landing in a Republic F-84 Thunderjet at Lee, Florida.

22 December
"WELLINGTON, N.Z. Dec. (AAP.-Reuter's).- A Mustang aircraft of number two Territorial Squadron, Wellington, crashed at Tongaporutu about 40 miles north of New Plymouth this afternoon. Another is missing. An unidentified body from the first plane was found by the burnt out wreckage. The aircraft, together with two other Mustangs of number two squadron, left Ohakea this afternoon for Whenuapai where they were due at 4:20 p.m. According to the pilots of the two aircraft which arrived at Whenuapai, a single file formation was formed, which is customary in bad weather. Contact with the crashed plane and the one still missing was lost at Waitara, a few miles from New Plymouth. At midnight tonight a ground party led by police, will begin a search for the second Mustang and R.N.Z A.F. planes from the air force stations at Ohakea and Whenuapai will begin an air search at first light tomorrow." P-51D-25-NT, NZ2404, ex-45-11493, c.n. 124-48246, received from storage by No.2 (Wellington) TAF Squadron 11 July 1952. Crashed at Tongaporutu in northern Taranaki after the pilot became disorientated in cloud and lost control. Squadron Leader Maxwell Stevens killed. P-51D-25-NT, NZ2411, ex-45-11501, c.n. 124-48254, received from storage by No.2 (Wellington) TAF Squadron 11 July 1952. Crashed at Tongaporutu in northern Taranaki after the pilot became disorientated in cloud and lost control. Flying Officer Richard Westrupp killed.

== 1954 ==
3 January
A U.S. Air Force Curtiss C-46 Commando attempting a forced landing in Southern Japan hits trees, killing all four crew.

3 January
A Douglas B-26C Invader crashes and explodes in heavily wooded mountains 9 miles NE of Carrizozo, New Mexico, after two crew bail out Sunday night. Col. Frank E. Sharp, commander of Holloman AFB, New Mexico, states that the men were found Monday "in good physical condition." They received only minor bruises and scratches despite jumping into pitch darkness over the rugged Sacramento Mountain range. They were identified as Capt. Frederick M. Werth, Bristol, Virginia, and S/Sgt. Willie E. Woods, of Sunflower, Mississippi. B-26C-35-DT Invader, 44-35429, is written off.

6 January
DALLAS, Tex. (UP) – Army Capt. Harvey J. Collins was flown back to Fort Sill, Okla., Saturday to explain why he wrote a suicide note on his promotion orders, stole a plane and crashed it on a railroad track. Collins, 28, of Tacoma, Wash., surrendered to the 3223rd Air Police Detachment in Dallas late Friday night. He stole the plane – an L19 Army trainer – from the Fort Sill airport at 1:30 a.m. Wednesday and crashed it at Temple, Okla., 37 miles to the southeast. 'He made good sense when he talked to us,' an air policeman said. He didn't say where he'd been – in fact, he said he didn't know. He said he didn't know how he got out of the plane and what had happened since.' The Air Police took Collins, who was dressed in parts of an Army uniform and a flying suit and needed a shave, to Carswell Air Force Base in Fort Worth. He did tell the Air Police that he stole the plane and intended to kill himself, as his note said. Capt. Robert Spence, the Carswell public information officer, asked Collins whether he wanted to make a detailed explanation. 'No, I don't want to make any comment until I see my commander,' he told Spence. Most of the note, addressed to his wife, was not legible. It was written in grease paint on the orders promoting him to captain. But one sentence said: 'I am going to die in the air like I want to.' Mrs. Collins, who lived near Fort Sill with their two children, said she had no idea why he stole the plane. Her husband is a former Marine, who was taking pilot training at Fort Sill as part of an Army aviation tactics course."

15 January
USAF Boeing B-29A-40-BN Superfortress, 44-61681, c/n 11788, of the 580th Air Resupply and Communications Wing, practicing low-level night mission over the Libyan desert, suffers controlled flight into terrain at cruise speed 40 miles S of Wheelus Air Base. Aircraft was equipped with an HTR-13 obstruction-warning radar but it did not take control of the aircraft to raise it over obstructions, only providing a warning.

16 January
A USAF Douglas B-26 Invader, returning to Sewart AFB, Tennessee, from Shaw AFB, South Carolina, crashes under murky skies into a home near Nashville, Tennessee, killing all three crew but sparing three residents serious injury. The house was badly burned and wreckage was spread out over "about a three-quarter-mile area" after the bomber exploded. Crew bodies were badly mangled.

26 January
A RAF Boeing Washington B.1, WF495, of 149 Squadron, disappears during the night en route from Prestwick to Laagens in the Azores. Aircraft is believed to have come down in Morecambe Bay but after an intensive search lasting several days no trace is ever found. Aircraft was on return flight back to USAF. Last message from pilot mentioned icing and it is thought this condition led to loss of control. Seven crew lost. Another source gives date as 27 January.

1 February
USAF Curtiss C-46D-15-CU Commando, 44-78027, c/n 33423, suffered an in-flight fire. Pilot attempted a ditching in the Tsugaru Straits, but aircraft crashed off Hokkaido, 36 killed.

16 February
During training in the Pacific out of San Diego. California, Grumman AF-2S Guardian, BuNo 126806, of VS-21, 'BS' tail code, is lost off the deck of USS Point Cruz. Three crew escape from the airframe before it sinks and are recovered.

23 February
Grumman AF-2S Guardian, BuNo 129218, of VS-39, 'SN' tail code, catches a wire on landing but leaves the deck on the port side of USS Antietam and is lost off the coast of Guantanamo Bay, Cuba.

2 March
McDonnell F2H-3 Banshee loses partial power while in landing pattern for the USS Oriskany (CV-34), dropping below glide path. Unable to boost the jet back on slope, the Banshee suffers ramp strike, fuselage breaks in two, fuel tanks erupt in orange fireball, aft end of plane falls into the sea, forward fuselage and cockpit rolls down deck, pilot miraculously surviving unhurt.

4 March
USAF Douglas C-47A-45-DL Skytrain, 42-24096, c/n 9958, strikes a mountain near Saint-Étienne-de-Tinée, France, due to a navigation error, killing all 20 on board. Crew of four and 16 passengers were en route from Rome to Bitburg, West Germany, when the aircraft was lost. A fleet of 26 French and Italian aircraft conducted a search for the missing flight.

5 March
A USAF Boeing B-47E-60-BW Stratojet, 51-2416, of the 303rd Bomb Wing, crashes and burns in the desert just after an 0200 hrs. MST take off from Davis-Monthan AFB, Arizona, coming down ~one mile SW of the runway and killing all four crew. KWF are Capt. Ralph D. Skidmore, 29, of Flagstaff, Arizona, aircraft commander; Capt. Clifford E. Nadeau, 35, Beldenville, Wisconsin, observer; 1st Lt. Dale C. Smith, 26, Alameda, California, pilot; and M/Sgt. Arthur B. Crocker, (age misprinted as "234"), Corinth, Maine, crew chief. Aircraft lost power after lift off while deploying to Greenham Common, UK.

9 March
McDonnell XF3H-1 Demon, BuNo 125444, suffers explosion of Westinghouse XJ40-WE-6 engine, pilot B. North ejects at 15,000 feet. Airframe impacts on land. Second prototype is grounded permanently shortly thereafter as being unsafe to fly, and scrapped, with little additional data expected to be produced by its operation.

16 March
RAF de Havilland Mosquito TT.35, TH992, 'N-for-Norman', built at Hatfield as a B.35, and modified as a target-tug, of No. 2 APS at Sylt, on mission over the North Sea, loses starboard engine. While attempting to return to base the port engine overheats, pilot puts it down on the first available land, a beach on the island of Anrum, N of Heligoland, shearing off starboard engine and breaking fuselage into three pieces, but no post-crash fire. Pilot and Target Towing Operator (TTO) survive with minor injuries. Airframe believed to have been burnt where it came to rest.

17 March
Test pilot Joe Lynch is killed in the crash of the first North American TF-86F Sabre, 52-5016, when he performed a slow-roll on take-off at Edwards AFB, California.

18 March
McDonnell F3H-1N Demon, BuNo 133490, suffers engine fire during test flight out of Naval Air Test Center Patuxent River, Maryland. Airframe tumbles, and crashes at sea. LCDR N. J. Smith III ejects at 14,000 ft, 480 kn.

19 March
"YOKOHAMA (AP) – A U.S. Marine helicopter crashed and exploded in a field north of here Friday, killing three Americans. Names of the victims were withheld." Captain Gerald R. Lentz took off from NAS Atsugi, Japan, flying a Sikorsky HRS-3 helicopter, BuNo 130206, c/n 55334, of H&MS 11, MAG-11 of 1 MAW, on a round robin to Hardy Barracks, Tokyo, Japan. After discharging a passenger at Hardy Barracks Captain Lentz proceeded on the return leg of the round robin from Tokyo to Atsugi. At 1110 hrs, when approx 5 miles NW of Yokohama and at an altitude of 450 feet, the main transmission left the airframe with all three blades attached. Almost simultaneously upon leaving the airframe, one of the blades struck the tail cone, severing it from the rest of the fuselage. Cpl Harry J. Pitre in the lefthand side seat and MSgt Alexander N. Clark in the forward cabin seat were also killed.

19 March
"AMELIA, Va. (AP) – At least one airman was killed when a B26 exploded and crashed in a swampy area near here Friday night. A portion of one body was found but there were indications that more were aboard." B-26B, 44-35965, built as B-26C-55-DT, piloted by Hughie M. Maples Jr., crashed ~three miles NW of Amelia.

19 March
A USAF Fairchild C-119F-FA Flying Boxcar, 51-7993, c/n 10732, of the 774th Troop Carrier Squadron, Ardmore Air Force Base, Oklahoma, en route from Maxwell Air Force Base, Alabama, to Mitchel Air Force Base, Long Island, New York, crashes into a rain-swept cornfield 19 miles S of Annapolis, Maryland, killing all 18 on board. It had departed Bolling Air Force Base, Washington, D.C., after refueling at 2212 hrs. A watch found in the wreckage had stopped at 2229 hrs. A spokesman at Bolling said that there were twelve passengers and six crewmen aboard. There were 11 Air Force personnel, five U.S. Navy, and one Marine on board. Witnesses reported that the aircraft was on fire before the crash and appeared to have exploded. The plane grazed the edge of a wooded area just off Maryland Route 2 before it impacted. Twisted wreckage and bodies were strewn over a ten-acre area. A heavy rain aided firemen in preventing the fire from getting out of hand. A detachment of sailors and Marines from the U. S. Naval Academy at Annapolis stood guard over the area as a group of investigators from Andrews Air Force Base, Maryland, examined the wreckage for clues to the cause of the tragedy.

21 March
Navy Reserve pilot Lt. John Fielder, 31, of Fullerton, California, vanishes while flying McDonnell F2H-1 Banshee, BuNo 122556, of VF-777, in storm clouds above Southern California while on a weekend training flight out of NAS Los Alamitos. Just before his disappearance he radios his commander that he is bailing out. A search by six Marine helicopters on Monday, 22 March, focuses on the Silverado Canyon area NE of MCAS El Toro where two ranchers reported hearing a crash about the time Fielder went missing. Initial searches of the Catalina Channel region and coastal and mountain areas near Santa Ana found no trace of the pilot. Fielder did not survive his bail out.

23 March
While conducting training in the Pacific out of San Diego. California, Grumman AF-2W Guardian, BuNo 129265, of VS-21, 'BS' tail code, hits the island of USS Point Cruz prior to crashing into the sea. CDR. Rodney G. Orr and AT-3 Hershall Elliot escape from the airframe before it sinks and are recovered.

26 March
Possible disaster is avoided when a Grumman F9F-6 Cougar of VF-112 out of NAS Miramar, abandoned in a spin by its pilot some 80 miles out over the Pacific Ocean, rights itself and heads towards the San Diego area of the coast. Another VF-112 pilot experiments for 12 minutes with using the airflow off his own Cougar's wing to herd the errant jet away and finds that he can direct the pilotless fighter in a harmless direction. Lt.(jg) J. R. Maccoun, 23, of Dutch Flat, California, stated that his F9F-6 went into a spin at about 23,000 feet and that he ejected at about 9,000 feet when he could not effect a recovery. After he divorced the airframe and deployed his canopy at 5,000 feet, the fighter proceeded to pull out of the spin at ~4,000 feet, climbed to ~8,000 feet, and headed for land. Lt.(jg) C. W. Vandeberg, 25, of Ripon, California, observing this, brought his own plane alongside the runaway and found that he could turn it 180 degrees back out to sea with his slipstream. He followed it until it crashed in the sea. Meanwhile, another jet pilot on the gunnery practice flight, Ens. B. G. Huntley, 22, of La Jolla, California, monitored Maccoun's parachute until he was in the water and contacted and guided an anti-submarine helicopter out of Ream Field operating in the area to the downed pilot's location. Not being equipped for rescue, the chopper crew lowered a rope which Maccoun tied around himself to be lifted up after 35 minutes in the ocean. All three pilots were of VF-112. Maccoun "is the son of retired U.S. Coast Guard Rear Admiral W. E. Maccoun, now vacationing with his wife at Dana Point, California."

27 March
USAF Capt. Berry H. Young, 9th Bomb Squadron, 7th Bomb Wing, lands his Convair B-36H Peacemaker safely at Carswell AFB, Texas, with all three reciprocating engines on the starboard wing inoperative, the outboard jets completely disabled, and the landing flaps inoperative. These problems are further compounded when two engines windmill, without cockpit control, and the landing gear has to be lowered by emergency procedures. This incident becomes known as the "Miracle Landing". In acknowledgement of this feat, the entire crew is awarded the Carswell Crew of the Month Award, and later receives a personal commendation from General Curtis E. LeMay, Commander-In-Chief, Strategic Air Command. "An Air Force spokesman said such landings, with no power on one side, are extremely rare."

30 March
A Fairchild C-119F-FA Flying Boxcar, 51-2679, c/n 10668, careens into a US Army mess hall and explodes after crash-landing in a parade field at Fort Bragg, North Carolina, United States, killing five aboard the plane and two inside the building.

8 April

A Royal Canadian Air Force Noorduyn Harvard collided with a Trans-Canada Airlines Canadair North Star over Moose Jaw, Saskatchewan, killing 37 people.

26 April
Northrop N-69 Snark, GM-11111, launches from Cape Canaveral, Florida, crashes 3,000 yards from launcher, just after the booster rockets separate, due to loss of electrical power.

29 April
A hangar fire at RCAF Station Vancouver does $1,500,000 in damage and destroys six planes, according to a United Press report. Two de Havilland Canada DHC-3 Otters are known destroyed, 3670 and 3676. Also destroyed is Sikorsky H-5, 9606. This source also cites incorrect date of 4 May for the fire.

Post-April
Third prototype SAAB J 32 Lansen, 32–3, first flown April 1954 and tasked with armament testing, crashes after just 35 flight hours when it flies into the ground at high speed, killing Bengt Fryklund, an experienced pilot who had graduated at the top of his intake at the Empire Test Pilot School. Cause was difficult to determine as airframe was destroyed.

7 May
A U.S. Navy Lockheed P2V Neptune of VP-23 crashes into the surf ~200 yards from shore near Nassau, Bahamas, and all ten crew perish. Six bodies were recovered by Friday night, and other bodies were sighted trapped in the wreckage.

7 May
Capt. Howard Nelson, 29, is rescued after he bails out of a 62d Fighter-Interceptor Squadron North American F-86D Sabre on a flight out of O'Hare Air Reserve Station, Chicago, Illinois.

10 May
A North American F-86D Sabre of the 62d Fighter-Interceptor Squadron, O'Hare Air Reserve Station, Chicago, Illinois, catches fire Monday night at 37,000 feet over Lake Michigan. The pilot, 2d Lt. Theodore R. Miller, 22, of Venice, California, bails out and is rescued about 0100 hrs. floating two hours in a raft off of Kenosha, Wisconsin. Miller was able to radio his situation to O'Hare ground controllers and his blip was watched on radar so the controllers directed the Coast Guard to the pick-up.

13 May
North American F-86D-20-NA Sabre, 51-2960, listed with the USAF 42nd FIS (501st ADG) in 1954; Written off at O'Hare Airport, Illinois, this date.

17 May
Royal Navy Supermarine Attacker FB.1, WA533, of 736 Squadron is damaged upon landing aboard HMS Illustrious when port main gear collapses. Airframe is repaired, but sees no more operational flying.

30 May
A North American F-86A Sabre of the 3599th Flying Training Squadron, Nellis Air Force Base, Nevada, crash lands at McGuire Air Force Base, New Jersey, with the pilot receiving fatal burns. First Lt. Charles Grenz, 24, of Radburn, New Jersey, was pulled alive from his burning fighter, but was dead upon arriving at the base hospital. The pilot's mother was waiting in the McGuire base operations office to drive him home for Memorial Day.

3 June
Cape Canaveral, Florida Missile Test Range, supports the first attempted recovery of a winged missile that flew a programmed pattern and then returned to the Cape for refurbishing and reuse. A Northrop N-69A Snark missile, GM-3394, was successfully guided for landing on the Cape Canaveral Skid Strip, but the missile's rear skid was not locked and the vehicle crashed and exploded upon contact.

4 June
A report from Seoul states that five Americans are lost when a U.S. Marine transport crashes or ditches in the Sea of Japan, a Marine spokesman reported on Saturday 5 June. The Fifth Air Force said on Friday night that eight or nine aboard the plane had been rescued, but a First Air Wing spokesman said that eleven were on board and that only six were picked up.

6 June
"TOKYO (Monday) (AP) – The U.S. Navy reported Sunday night that one body has been recovered and four other airmen were presumed dead after a JD1 utility plane crashed in the Inland Sea Sunday. Aboard were a pilot, a navigator and three crew members. Rescue personnel in crash boats found the body and the personal effects of the other four about five miles off the city of Iwakuni. They marked the spot with a buoy. The search was resumed Monday. The water at the point is 96 feet deep. The Navy planned to send down divers. The customary investigation was ordered to determine cause of the crash. The plane was on a flight from Atsugi Naval Air Station to Itazuke. Names of the victims were withheld pending notification of next of kin." The Navy released the victims' names on 7 June. Amongst the dead were Lt. Cmdr. James William Barbee Jr., of San Lorenzo, California, and Ens. James Boyd Triplett, of South Gate, California.

7 June
Two U.S. Army crewmen are killed when a Sikorsky H-19 Chickasaw develops engine trouble and crashes into a building five miles E of Seoul, South Korea. The pilot and copilot are seriously injured.

7 June
"SEOUL, Korea (UP) – Two F86 Sabre Jets collided in mid-air Monday, but both pilots parachuted to earth safely. The pilots refused publication of their names for fear their wives would be upset, the spokesman said."

9 June
"WASHINGTON (AP) – The Navy announced Wednesday night the names of 17 men who were aboard a Navy amphibian plane overdue on a flight Wednesday between Japan and Okinawa. The plane was attached to the Navy patrol squadron at Iwakuni Air Base. The Navy said next of kin have been notified. Personnel aboard the plane included: Lt. Wallace R. Carter, husband of Mrs. Wanda L. Carter, 1011 Taylor Ave., Alameda, Calif. Lt. J. G. William B. Hedric, husband of Mrs. Joan H. Hedric, 842 Harvard Dr., Alameda, Calf. Ens. Homer F. Trotter Jr., son of Mr. and Mrs. Walter B. Norris, 1312 E. Walker, San Bernardino, Calif. Aviation Electronics Man 1-c Laurence E. Stone, husband of Mrs. Betty J. Stone, 892 D. Thau Way, Alameda, Calif. Aviation Machinist Mate 3-c Walter R. Raab, son of Mr. and Mrs. Harold E. Raab, 13609 Cordary Ave., Hawthorne, Calif. Marine Maj. James R. O'Moore, husband of Mrs. Dorothy D. O'Moore, 619 Poppy Avenue, Corono Del Mar [sic], Calif." The wreckage of the Martin PBM-5 Mariner, BuNo 84779 (?), was sighted Friday 11 June by an Air Force search plane, smashed against a 6,300-foot island mountain on rugged Yakushima, 50 miles off Southern Japan. There were seven Navy and two Marine officers and eight sailors aboard when it departed Iwakuni. It disappeared in stormy weather five hours later. There were no survivors. Others on board were: Lt.(JG) Cecil F. Hackeny Jr., Birmingham, Alabama; Lt. (JG) Wallace H. Wertz, Newport, Pennsylvania; Ens. John D. McCathy, Olean, New York; Ens. Berje Weramian, Corpus Christi, Texas; Douglas C. Campbell, Electronics Technician 2/c, Boscobel, Wisconsin; Ira E. Crider, Telman 3/c, Tyler, Texas; Jerrold D. Edwards, Aviation Electronics Technician 3/c, Portland, Oregon; Ronald D. Graham, Aviation Structural Mechanic 2/c, Donora, Pennsylvania; Donald D. Landon, Photographers Mate 3/c, and James E. Landon, Aviation Ordnance Man 2/c, Pittsburgh, Pennsylvania; and Marine Capt. Theodore R. Moore, Warren, Pennsylvania. The Marines were from the First Marine Air Wing, six officers and seven enlisted were from VP-47, and one officer and one enlisted were from Fleet Air Wing Six.

11 June
A Vought F7U-3 Cutlass, BuNo 129647, crashes into a building at Naval Air Station Memphis, Tennessee, killing five but missing 100 sailors who left the structure three minutes earlier. Both the building and the airframe burned. The pilot and four on the ground die.

14 June
A Grumman AF-2W Guardian crash lands in a bean field at Norwalk, Connecticut, but the pilot and two passengers escape injury. The anti-submarine "guppy" clips two power lines and is damaged in the belly landing. The Navy identifies those aboard as Lt, (J.G.) Edgar C. Alexander, 28, of Long Beach, California, pilot; and passengers Lee A. Colestock, 22, Photographer 3.c, of Eaton Rapids, Michigan; and James M. Key, 25, Aviation Storekeeper 1.c, Rock Island, Oklahoma.

17 June
A USAF Beechcraft C-45 Expeditor from Hamilton Air Force Base, California, crash lands in the surf one mile NW of Ventura, California, Four officers escape with minor injuries. They are Lt. Col. Harry M. Thompson, 35, pilot; Capt. Owen C. Johnson, 32, co-pilot; and 1st Lt. Robert E. Shrider and 2d Lt. Orvil L. Cook, passengers, all of Hamilton AFB.

27 June
American Airlines Convair 240, N94263, with 34 aboard, is struck from below while landing at Port Columbus Airport, Columbus, Ohio, by U.S. Navy Beechcraft SNB-2C Navigator, BuNo 23773, ripping loose the airliner's port engine. Captain J. C. Pollard and First Officer J. S. Myrick, 30, both of Nashville, succeed in putting the plane down. The Convair skids to a halt on the runway on its nose as the nose gear fails to extend, and rescue and fire crews extinguish the blazing wing, nose, and baggage compartment. All aboard survive. The SNB crashed immediately and exploded. Two dead aboard the SNB are identified by Dr. Carl E. Teterick, acting coroner, as Lt. Cmdr. John Hoerath, 37, of Westerville, Ohio, and Lt. Cmdr. Donald Gavin Edgar, 48, of Columbus. They were flying from Lafayette, Indiana, to Naval Air Station Columbus.

27 June
Boeing KC-97G-25-BO Stratofreighter, 52-2654, of the 96th Bomb Wing, Altus AFB, Oklahoma, groping its way through dark and heavy overcast strikes Box Springs Mountain at 0308 hrs. PDT and explodes while diverting to Norton AFB, San Bernardino, California, from March AFB at Riverside, killing all 14 on board. Within 90 minutes, the 42d Air Rescue Squadron from March arrives on scene, five miles E of Riverside, to find no survivors. "The only Chicagoland victim of the crash was Staff Sgt. James R. Morgan, 33, of Anderson, Ind."

1 July
Second of 13 North American X-10s, GM-19308, c/n 2, on Navaho X-10 flight number 7, crashes and burns after 8 minutes of flight out of Edwards AFB, California, when a fire develops on board.

14 July
First prototype Handley Page Victor bomber, WB771, is lost when the tailplane detaches while making a low-level pass over the runway at Cranfield, causing the aircraft to crash with the loss of the crew. Attached to the fin using three bolts, the tailplane was subject to considerably more stress than had been anticipated and the three bolts failed due to metal fatigue.

26 July
Lieutenant Floyd C. Nugent suffers landing gear problem in Vought F7U-3 Cutlass, BuNo 129552, of FASRON-2, aims jet out to sea and ejects, "only to watch the Cutlass, loaded with 2.75-inch rockets, fly serenely on, orbiting San Diego's North Island and the Hotel Del Coronado for almost 30 minutes before ditching near the shore."

27 July
Second prototype Avro Vulcan, VX777, suffers substantial damage when it swings off runway upon landing at Farnborough. It will not fly for six months.

5 August
As the first pre-production Douglas A2D-1 Skyshark, BuNo 125480, piloted by George Jansen, is flown on a test flight out of Edwards AFB, California, the temperamental gearbox transferring the Allison XT-40A power to counter-rotating propellers fails, and even though the powerplant continues to partially function, the props automatically feather. Unable to spot a reasonable landing spot, the pilot ejects, suffering back injuries that leave him a plaster cast for several months. The Skyshark program is cancelled one month later, with only six of ten pre-production A2D-1s completed ever being flown.

21 August
Col. Einar Axel Malmstrom, vice wing commander at Great Falls Air Force Base, Montana, is killed in the crash of a Lockheed T-33A-1-LO Shooting Star trainer, 52-9630, c/n 7815, near the base. Local citizens then urge the renaming of the facility in his honor. The base was renamed on 15 June 1956.

24 August
The pilot of a Republic F-84G Thunderjet dies at Eglin AFB following an ejection as the aircraft rolled to a stop after landing at Eglin Auxiliary Field 6. The Thunderjet was on a routine training mission.

26 August
Top Korean War USAF ace Capt. Joseph C. McConnell (16 victories) is killed in crash of fifth production North American F-86H Sabre, 52-1981, at Edwards AFB, California.

27 August
A Convair B-36 Peacemaker crashes while attempting a landing following a training mission at Ellsworth Air Force Base near Rapid City, South Dakota. Of the 27 crewmembers aboard, 24 die and 3 are injured in the initial crash, making it the deadliest B-36 crash to date. Two additional victims later succumb to their injuries, bringing the total death toll to 26. The sole survivor, Lt. Roger Bumps, later recovers from his injuries.

31 August
Sole Cessna XL-19B Bird Dog, 52-1804, c/n 22780A, modified with Boeing XT-50-BO-1 210 shp turboprop engine, crashes 2 miles (3.2 km) W of Sedgwick, Kansas.

22 September
A USAF North American EF-86D-5-NA Sabre, 50–516, crashes and burns on take-off from Eglin Air Force Base, Florida killing the pilot. After briefly becoming airborne, it settled back onto the runway's end, continues off the overrun area and comes to rest in a marshy stream bed ~1,000 feet (300 m) to the north.

27 September
Sole Folland Midge prototype, G-39-1, crashes into trees at Chilbolton, England, killing the Swiss pilot. Cause was believed to have been inadvertent application of full nose-down trim.

28 September
Fourth of 13 North American X-10s, GM-19310, c/n 4, on Navaho X-10 flight number 10, a structural test flight, successfully makes extreme manoeuvres at Mach 1.84. However automated landing system attempts to make landing flare 6 m below the runway level at Edwards AFB, California. Vehicle impacts at high speed and is destroyed. However the flight sets a speed record for a turbojet-powered aircraft.

30 September
XA271 a Royal Air Force Miles Marathon T1 of No. 2 Air Navigation School dives into the ground near Calne, Wiltshire, England following structural failure of outer wings.

October
The sole prototype Tupolev Tu-75 military transport, derived from the Tupolev Tu-70 airliner, itself a derivative of the Tupolev Tu-4 "Bull" bomber, first flown 21 January 1950, crashes after several years of use by MAP (Ministerstvo Aviatsionnoy Promyshlennosti – Ministry of Aviation Industry).

12 October
USAF North American F-100A-1-NA Super Sabre, 52-5764, c/n 192–9, crashes at Edwards Air Force Base, California, at 1100 hrs., killing North American test-pilot Lt. George Welch, a veteran of the Japanese Navy attack on Pearl Harbor in 1941. During terminal velocity dive test from 45,000 feet (14,000 m), aircraft yaws to starboard, then begins roll. Airframe breaks up under 8 G strain, pilot falls clear, chute opens, but he sustains fatal injuries, dying shortly after reaching the ground.

12 October
A United States Navy Lockheed P2V Neptune undergoing test cycles by the Air Force Operational Test Center at Eglin AFB suffers a structural failure on landing at Auxiliary Field Number 8 which causes the starboard engine to break loose and burn in a Tuesday morning accident. The crew of two escape injury.

13 October
Royal Navy Lt. B. D. Mcfarlane has extraordinary escape when his Westland Wyvern TF1, VZ783, 'X', of 813 Squadron, suffers power failure on take-off from HMS Albion in the Mediterranean Sea due to unforeseen tendency of the turboprop engine to suffer fuel starvation in high-G catapult launch. Aircraft goes into water off the bow, is cut in half by the ship, pilot ejects underwater using Martin-Baker Mk.2B ejection seat, survives with slight injuries.

19 October
First flying prototype Grumman XF9F-9 Tiger, BuNo 138604, suffers flame-out, the pilot, Lt. Cdr. W. H. Livingston, was able to put it down on the edge of a wood near the Grumman company runway at Bethpage, Long Island, New York, escaping with minor injuries. Airframe written-off. Production models will be redesignated F11F.

21 October
XA546 a Royal Air Force Gloster Javelin FAW.1 on a pre-delivery test flight crashes into the Bristol Channel.

29 October
A Boeing RB-47E-30-BW Stratojet, 52–770, of the 90th Strategic Reconnaissance Wing based at Forbes AFB, Kansas, goes out of control at ~10,000 feet and plunges vertically to the ground SW of Olathe, Kansas, killing three of four crew. The pilot, Capt. Norman Palmer, 32, of Rochester, Indiana, ejected and survived, although with injuries. He suffered fractures of the right arm and shoulder after parachuting from low altitude. "A witness, Dr. Jack Flickinger of Baldwin, Kansas, said the burning craft went into a vertical dive at 1,000 to 2,000 feet and plunged straight into the ground." He said that a hole 40 feet deep was blasted on impact with wreckage thrown 500 yards in all directions. Dead were Capt. Hassel O. Green, 32, instructor-pilot, of Newsite, Mississippi; Capt. George H. Miller, 33, co-pilot, of Burbank, California; and Capt. Arthur F. Bouton Jr., 31, observer, of Little Rock, Arkansas. Lt. Allen Oppegard, Air Information Services officer at the Naval Air Station Olathe, said the pilot told medical personnel from the base that the plane went out of control at about 10,000 feet but that he did not know why. The pilot said he did not recall how he got out of the aircraft.

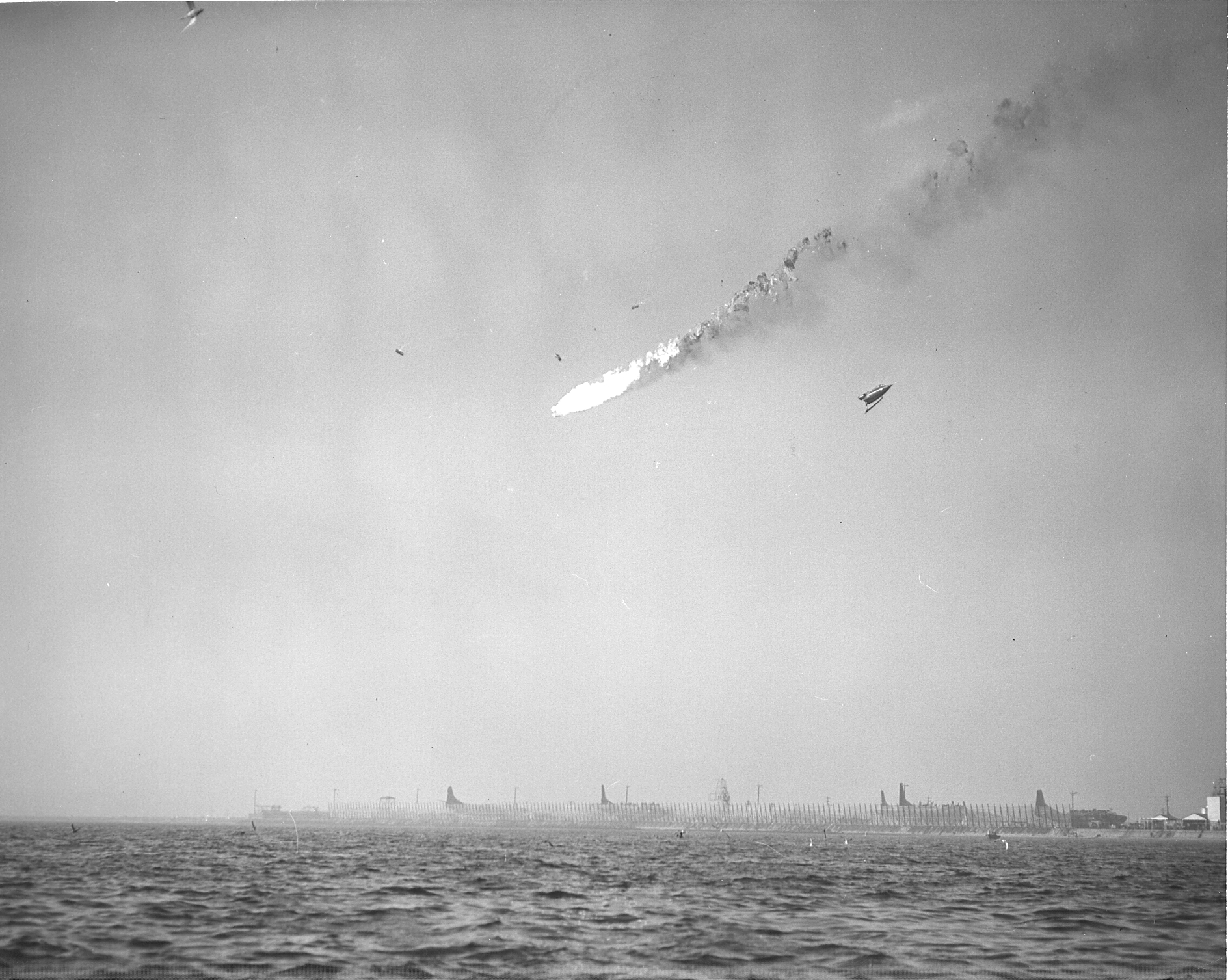
Convair XF2Y-1 135762 disintegrates over San Diego Bay, 4 November 1954.

4 November
Convair YF2Y-1 Sea Dart, BuNo 135762, disintegrated in mid-air over San Diego Bay, California, during a demonstration for Navy officials and the press, killing Convair test pilot, Charles E. Richbourg. Pilot inadvertently exceeded airframe limitations.

4 November
A USAF Convair T-29A-CO, 50–189, on a routine training flight departs Tucson Municipal Airport, Arizona, after refueling for return leg to Ellington AFB, Texas. Shortly after departure, the pilot radios that he has mechanical problems and requests emergency return to Tucson. Aircraft strikes power lines on final approach and crashes into a perimeter fence short of the runway. All crew are KWF.

8 November
Royal Air Force Air Commodore Geoffrey D. Stephenson, former commandant of the Royal Air Force Central Fighter Establishment, is killed in the crash of a USAF North American F-100A-10-NA Super Sabre, 53-1534, c/n 192–29, near Auxiliary Field 2 of Eglin Air Force Base, Florida. Commodore Stephenson, on a tour of the U.S., is flying at 13,000 feet (4,000 m) as he joins formation with another F-100 when his fighter drops into a steep spiral, impacting at ~1414 hrs. in a pine forest on the Eglin Reservation, one mile (1.6 km) NE of the runway of Pierce Field, Auxiliary Fld. 2.

9 November
Spanish Air Force Dornier Do 24T-3, HR.5–1, burnt out.

9 November
North American F-100A-5-NA Super Sabre, 52-5771, c/n 192–16, crashes in Nevada, after control is lost during a gunnery test sortie. Pilot Maj. Frank N. Emory, of Mount Vernon, Washington, ejects, receiving only minor injuries. The Air Force grounds the new fighter on 10 November after this, the fifth loss of the type in just a few months. At this point, the USAF had about 70 of the aircraft. Instability problems are found to be largely due to insufficient tail area which is then increased and the design modified. The F-100 grounding order is lifted in early February 1955.

14–15 November
The U.S. Navy and Marine Corps have a very bad day, losing three aircraft and four crew in three accidents. A Lockheed PV-2 Harpoon, with five aboard, en route from Miami to NAS Anacostia, Washington, D.C., develops engine trouble at 7,000 feet and ditches after dark in Pamlico Sound, off of Point Lookout, North Carolina. The airframe breaks in two and sinks within 15 seconds, although four of the five crew escape. The fifth is lost with the plane. The survivors spend the night on a raft and are picked up by a Coast Guard amphibious search plane and conveyed to CGAS Elizabeth City, North Carolina, and thence to Portsmouth Naval Hospital, near Norfolk, for treatment of injuries. The lost crewman was Richard Zigmund Garlenski, seaman apprentice, of Washington, D.C. The survivors from the Harpoon are Lt. Cdr. George S. Smith, of Fairfax, Virginia; Lt. Robert L. Mallonee, of Towson, Maryland; Lt. Albert W. Funkhouser, of Edgewater, Maryland; and Airman Apprentice Dimitrius G. Sotiropolos, of Washington, D.C. Smith suffered a broken leg and head cuts; Mallonee, a possible ankle fracture and head cuts; Funkhouser and Sotiropolos escaped with only minor injuries. A Marine Corps Douglas F3D Skyknight, out of MCAS Cherry Point, North Carolina, is diverted from a routine flight to search for the Harpoon. The jet radios at 2100 hours that it has sighted two flares while flying at 300 feet, and that it is descending to 200 feet for a better look. This is the last heard from the Skyknight, no trace of which or its two crew, 2d Lt. Roy Wilkins, 23, of Indio, California, and M/Sgt. Gerald A. Moreau, 30, of Havelock, North Carolina, being found during a day-long search by 75 aircraft and 40 ships. In a third incident, a Grumman S2F Tracker goes into the Atlantic Ocean at 0500 hours, immediately after launch from USS Antietam. The four crew are recovered by the destroyer USS Putnam shortly afterward, but one of them, Lt. Cdr. Willard A. Pollard, of Virginia Beach, Virginia, dies aboard the Putnam shortly after his rescue.

17 November
Fairey FD.2, WG774, a single-engined transonic research aircraft, the last British design to hold the World Air Speed Record, suffers engine failure on 14th flight when internal pressure build-up collapses the fuselage collector tank at 30,000 feet (9,100 m), 30 miles (48 km) from Boscombe Down. Fairey pilot Peter Twiss, stretches glide, dead-sticks into airfield, drops undercarriage at last moment but only nose gear deploys, jet bellies in, sustaining damage that sidelines it for eight months. Twiss, only shaken up, receives the Queen's Commendation for Valuable Service in the Air. FD.2 test program does not resume until August 1955.

17 November
Lt. Col. John Brooke England (1923–1954) is killed in a crash near Toul-Rosières Air Base, France when he banks away from a barracks area while landing his North American F-86F Sabre in a dense fog. His engine flamed out. He was on a rotational tour from Alexandria AFB, Louisiana, with the 389th Fighter-Bomber Squadron, which he commanded. He was a leading and much-decorated North American P-51 Mustang ace during World War II. Col. England flew 108 missions and scored 19 aerial victories-including 4 on one mission. England also served as a combat pilot in the Korean War. Alexandria Air Force Base is renamed England Air Force Base in his honor on 23 June 1955.

18 November
At 1715 hrs., this date, a B-25, unable to extend its undercarriage, belly lands at Norton Air Force Base, San Bernardino, California, and catches fire. Pilot Capt. Kraus W. Gregor, USAF Reserve, of 6450 Greenust Avenue, Van Nuys, California, sustains minor burns and cuts, but co-pilot Capt. Marion R. Taccone Jr., USAF Reserve, of 7760 Loma Verde Street, Canoga Park, California, crawls to the nose and evacuates the aircraft from a hatch before the plane stops moving, is struck and thrown across the pavement, sustaining fatal head and chest injuries. He dies just over an hour later, at 1825 hrs. Base firefighters quickly extinguish the blaze. The bomber, one of two which departed Norton at 1522 hrs. on a routine flight, is unable to drop the landing gear despite circling for an hour and trying to shake it down while burning off fuel. As the sun sets, the B-25 approaches from the west and touches down. Gregor receives burns when the port engine catches fire, although emergency crews awaiting the arrival surround the plane “within seconds” and extinguish the blaze with foam, and rush the injured to the hospital. Taccone's body is turned over to the Mark B. Shaw Company for transportation to Canoga Park for services and interment. He is survived by his widow, Grace E., and a son, Marion R., III.

18 November
Three North American F-86D Sabres of the 94th Fighter-Interceptor Squadron, George Air Force Base, California, suffer a mid-air collision over Silver Mountain, 20 miles N of Victorville, at 2330 hrs., while on a regular Air Defense Command mission. All three pilots eject, but only two survive. Lt. John K. Moser, 23, falls to his death from 9,000 feet after ejecting from his disabled fighter. “It wasn't known whether or not his chute opened during the long fall.” The other two pilots, Lts. Archie Ridall, of Shippensburg, Pennsylvania, and Carl Fechner, reported as being from Alta Vera, but probably actually Alta Vista, Kansas, parachuted safely to the ground after ejecting from their “wildly spinning” aircraft. “Both were hospitalized with severe shock and unable to tell details of what happened on their ill-fated flight. Moser's crumpled body was found by rescue crews from nearby George AFB lying near the flaming wreckage of his plane seven miles north of Victorville.” An Air Force spokesman at George said that Moser's only close relative is his mother, Mrs. Lyclia Moser, of Chicago. The body is taken to the Stanley L. Dickey Mortuary, Fontana, where funeral arrangements are pending. Moser was a native of Illinois. “A board of inquiry convened Friday and is expected to continue through Saturday, in an attempt to determine why the three night-flying jets collided.” This accident occurred as a board of inquiry was preparing to probe the crash-landing of a B-25 at Norton AFB a few hours earlier that killed the co-pilot.

19 November
Two North American F-86 Sabres are lost in separate incidents near Niagara Falls, New York, during a Friday night practice mission, killing one pilot, with the other ejecting. "The dead pilot was Maj. William M. Coleman, 36, a native of Fort Lauderdale, Fla. The pilot who escaped was Lt. Col. Rufus Woody Jr., 32." Maj. Coleman's F-86D, reported as 52-9686 (but that serial ties up to a T-33A-1-LO) comes down 14 miles NE of Niagara Falls. Lt. Col. Woody's F-86D-40-NA, 52-3639, c/n 190–35, impacts at Amherst, New York.

19 November
“DAYTON, Ohio (AP) – An ‘airplane parker’ at Wright-Patterson Air Force Base here was clipped on the chin by a propeller and she lived to tell about it. Mrs. Elizabeth Fennell, however, won't be talking about her escape for a few days. Base officials said it was a miracle she lived. The 29-year-old flightline employe [sic] lost a tooth and had 13 stitches taken in the lower part of her face. She was treated at the base hospital and sent home. She had guided a twin-engine C45 into parking position and was placing blocks in front of the plane's wheels when the propeller hit her.”

19 November
A North American B-25J converted to navigation trainer, on an "unauthorized flight" from Keesler Air Force Base, Mississippi, crashes 400 yd (370 m) off shore into the Mississippi Sound, exploding near the Biloxi lighthouse. The Air Force "said Saturday it appeared that only one man was aboard. The identity of the man was not known. There was no indication whether he was a member of the air force or a civilian. An air force spokesman said the body was recovered during the morning by salvage crews going through the wreckage in two feet of water about 400 yards off a resort beach. The plane exploded and the wreckage was scattered over a half mile area near the Biloxi lighthouse."

11 December
In Newport News, Virginia, Lieutenant J.W. Hood performs a low-altitude high-speed pass in a Vought F7U-3 Cutlass in front of a crowd of thousands at the christening of USS Forrestal. Due to a wing-locking mechanism malfunction, the airframe comes apart, an engine explodes, and Hood is thrown into the water and killed.

20 December
Grumman AF-2S Guardian, BuNo 124785, of VS-39, 'SN' tail code, suffers a forced landing in a field at East Killingly, Connecticut, and is burnt out in post-landing fire.

22 December
Capt. Richard J. Harer, test pilot with the Air Force Flight Test Center, Edwards AFB, California, belly lands a Lockheed F-94C-1-LO Starfire, 50-962, c/n 880-8007, on Rogers Dry Lake following engine problems, becomes trapped in the cockpit as the aircraft burns. Capt. Milburn "Mel" Apt, flying chase in another fighter, lands beside the failing F-94 and succeeds in pulling Harer from the burning jet, saving his life. Harer suffers a broken back, third degree burns and compound fractures of both legs that result in their amputation. Apt was awarded the Soldier's Medal for saving Harer's life.

== See also ==
- List of accidents and incidents involving the Lockheed C-130 Hercules
- Lists of accidents and incidents involving military aircraft
