= 't Heechhout =

't Heechhout Het Hooghout (Dutch)
- Hamlet
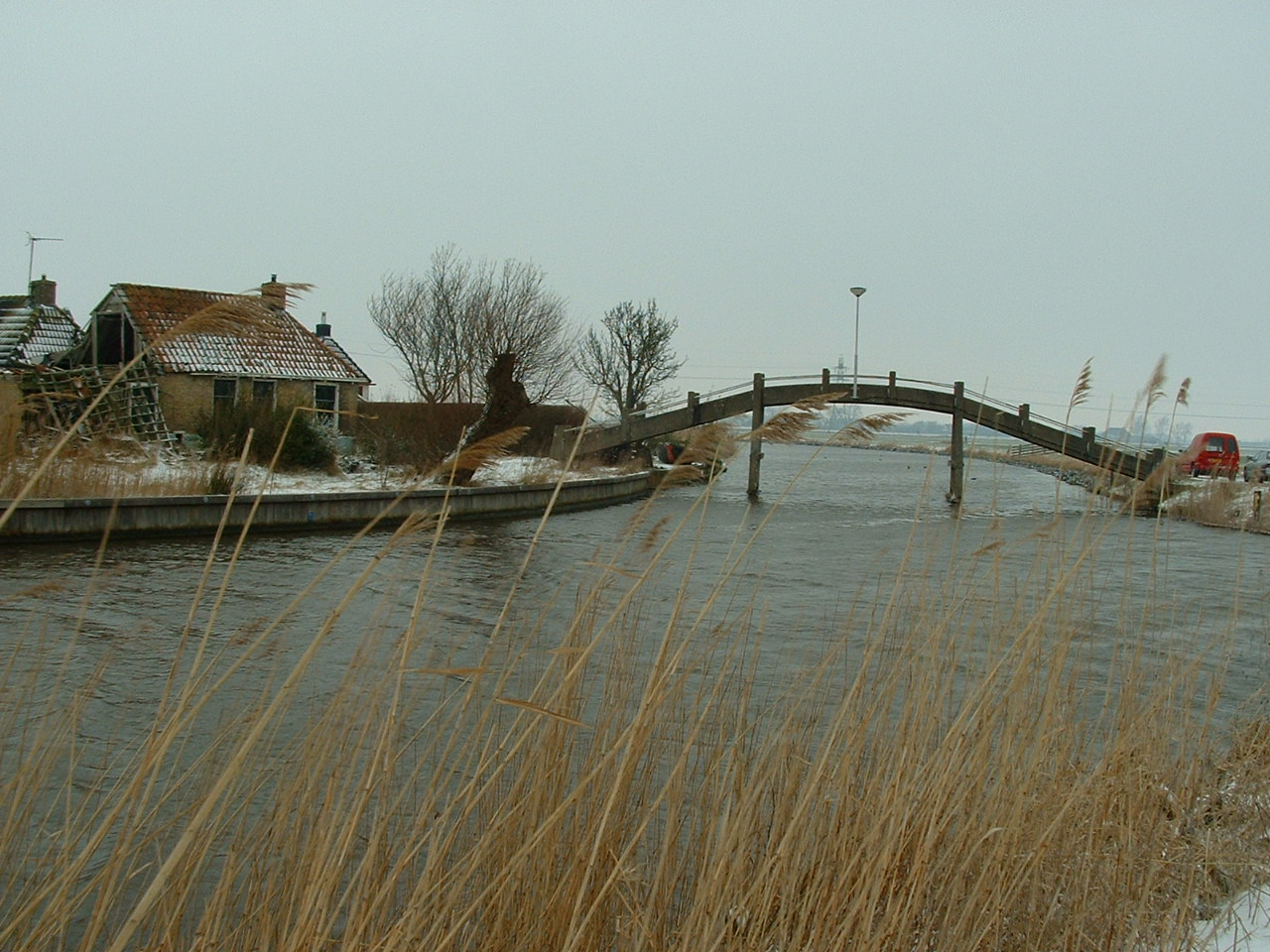
- Bridge near 't Heechhout

- Location in the province of Friesland in the Netherlands 't Heechhout (Netherlands)
- Coordinates: 53.16874°N 5.60038°E
- Country: Netherlands
- Province: Friesland
- Municipality: Waadhoeke
- Village: Wjelsryp
- Elevation: 0.1 m (0.33 ft)

Population
  - Total: c. 15
- Time zone: UTC+1 (CET)
  - Summer (DST): UTC+2 (CEST)
- Postcode: 8842
- Area code: 0517

't Heechhout (Dutch: Het Hooghout, pronounced [ət ˈɦoːxɦʌut]) is a hamlet in the Dutch municipality of Waadhoeke in the province of Friesland. It is located just to the north of Westerein and to the west of Wjelsryp, which it is administratively a part of. It is furthermore located on the Frjentsjerter Feart. At times, the residences just to the north of the N384, a trunk road, are sometimes erroneously considered to be part of the hamlet.

== Etymology ==
't Heechhout originated on the west side of the bridge over the canal. Around 1700 the bridge itself was referred to as Draayhout ('turn wood'). At that time, the bridge was still a large rotating plank. Later, in the 19th century, a higher bridge took its place – 't Heechhout is West Frisian for 'the high wood', and is in itself the name of a particular type of bridge. It was after the construction of this bridge that the hamlet was created. This West Frisian name is the official name of the hamlet; the former municipality of Littenseradiel, which became part of the municipality of Waadhoeke in 2018, declared in 1993 that it would render all West Frisian town names official, as opposed to the Dutch variants. Sometimes the name of the hamlet is spelled as Het Heechhout, which is actually a mixture of Frisian and Dutch (a frisism). (Note: In West Frisian, the article it (the in English and het in Dutch) is oftentimes shortened to 't.) It is also the name of the street on which the residence is located.
