= Republic F-84F Thunderstreak =

1950 fighter-bomber aircraft

F-84F Thunderstreak RF-84F Thunderflash
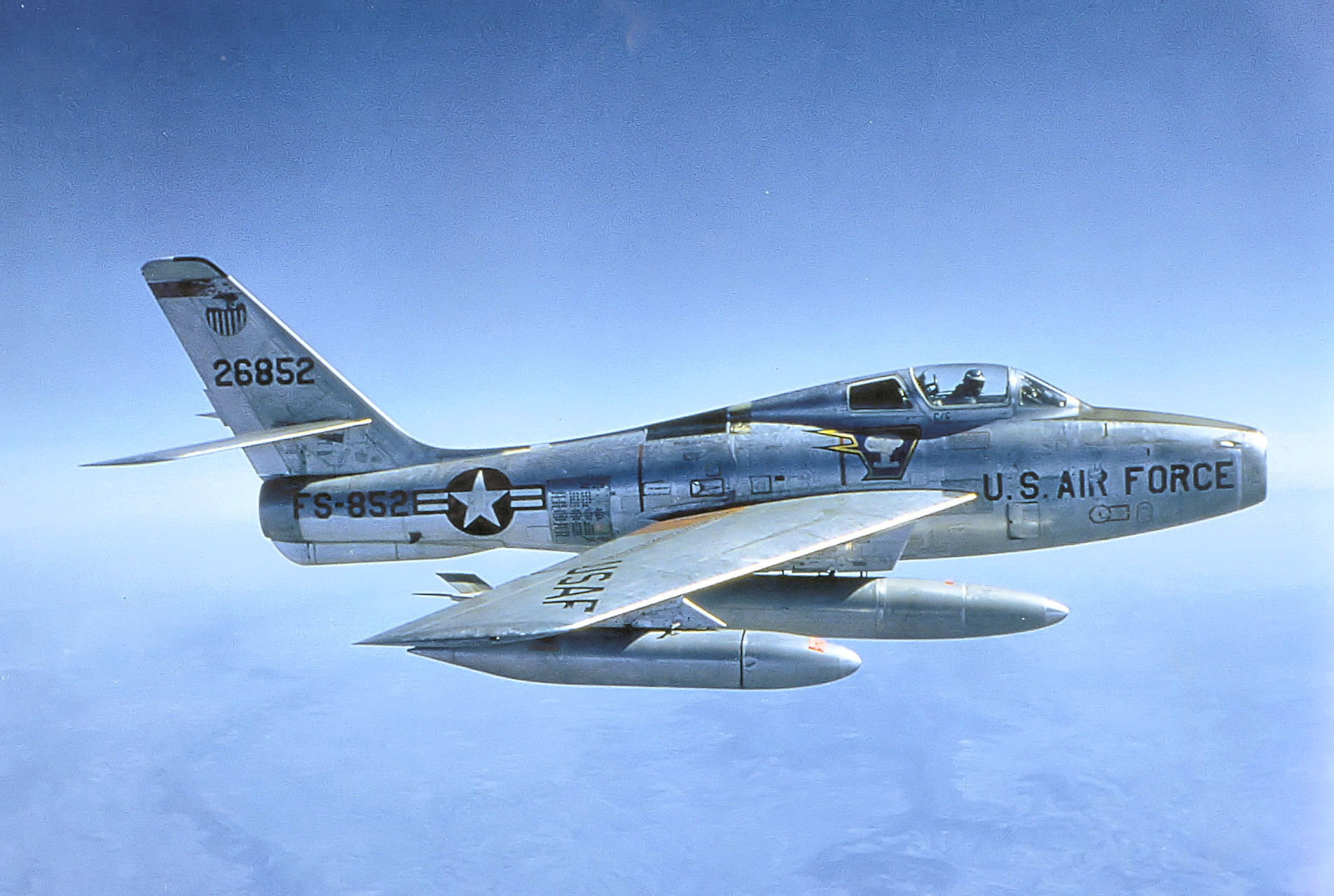
- USAF F-84F Thunderstreak

General information
- Type: Fighter-bomber; Reconnaissance aircraft
- National origin: United States
- Manufacturer: Republic Aviation
- Primary users: United States Air Force German Air Force; Italian Air Force; Belgian Air Force
- Number built: 3,428

History
- Introduction date: May 12, 1954
- First flight: June 3, 1950
- Retired: 1972 (US ANG); 1991 (Greece)
- Developed from: Republic F-84 Thunderjet
- Variant: Republic XF-84H Thunderscreech

The Republic F-84F Thunderstreak is a swept-wing turbojet-powered fighter-bomber designed and produced by the American aircraft manufacturer Republic Aviation. The RF-84F Thunderflash is a variant of the F-84F that was designed for the photo reconnaissance mission.

The aircraft was originally intended to be a relatively straightforward upgrade to the Republic F-84 Thunderjet to make it more competitive with the North American F-86 Sabre, differing largely in the use of a swept-wing and tail. Given the small number of changes, it was assigned the next model letter in the F-84 series, F. The prototypes demonstrated a number of performance and handling issues, which resulted in marginal improvement over the previous versions. Production was repeatedly delayed and another run of the straight-wing Thunderjets were completed as the G models. Looking for a clear performance edge compared to the G models, the engine was upgraded to the much more powerful British Armstrong Siddeley Sapphire built in the United States as the Wright J65. The larger engine required the fuselage to be stretched into an oval shape and the air intake to be modified. With these and other changes, the design was finally ready to enter production, but only a fraction of the original production systems could be used and the aircraft was effectively a new design.

In November 1954, the F-84F finally entered service with the United States Air Force (USAF); the RF-84F reconnaissance variant also entered service earlier that same year. On 9 March 1955, Lt. Col. Robert R. Scott set a three-hour, 44-minute and 53-second record between Los Angeles and New York in a F-84F. However, its service with the USAF as a front-line aircraft was relatively brief, partially due to the rival Sabre having also undergone many upgrades, which had led to the Thunderstreak being rapidly relegated to the fighter-bomber role and then into secondary roles as early as 1958. Having been superseded by newer combat aircraft, such as the North American F-100 Super Sabre and McDonnell RF-101 Voodoo, second hand F-84Fs were offered to NATO member countries as well as other friendly nations, who took up the type in large numbers. Overseas operators included the Belgian Air Force, Royal Danish Air Force, French Air Force, West German Air Force, Hellenic Air Force, Italian Air Force, Royal Netherlands Air Force, Royal Norwegian Air Force, Republic of China Air Force, Turkish Air Force, and for a brief period using ex-French examples, the Israeli Air Force. The final operator of the RF-84F was the Hellenic Air Force, which withdrew its last aircraft in 1991.

== Development ==
The F-84F Thunderstreak can trace its origins back to the late 1940s and a determination by Republic's design team that the design limits of the straight-winged F-84 had already been reached. Holding the ambition of achieving equivalent performance to that of the North American F-86 Sabre, work on a swept wing version of the F-84 commenced in 1948. The last production F-84E was fitted with a swept tail, a new wing with 38.5 degrees of leading edge sweep and 3.5 degrees of anhedral, and a J35-A-25 engine producing 5,300 pound-force (23.58 kN) of thrust. The resulting aircraft, which was designated XF-96A, performed its maiden flight on 3 June 1950 with Oscar P. Haas at the controls. Although the XF-96A proved to be capable of attaining 602 knots (693 mph; 1,115 km/h), the performance gain over the F-84E was considered to be minor. In light of this, Congress was unsupportive of funding the development of an entirely new fighter; in response, the United States Air Force (USAF) dispensed with the YF-96A designation in favour of F-84F, which imply it to be a more routine variant of the preceding aircraft instead. At an early stage of development, it had been anticipated to be a relatively low-cost improvement on the straight-wing Thunderjet that would retain over 55 percent commonality in tooling. Accordingly, the F-84F was ordered into production in July 1950.

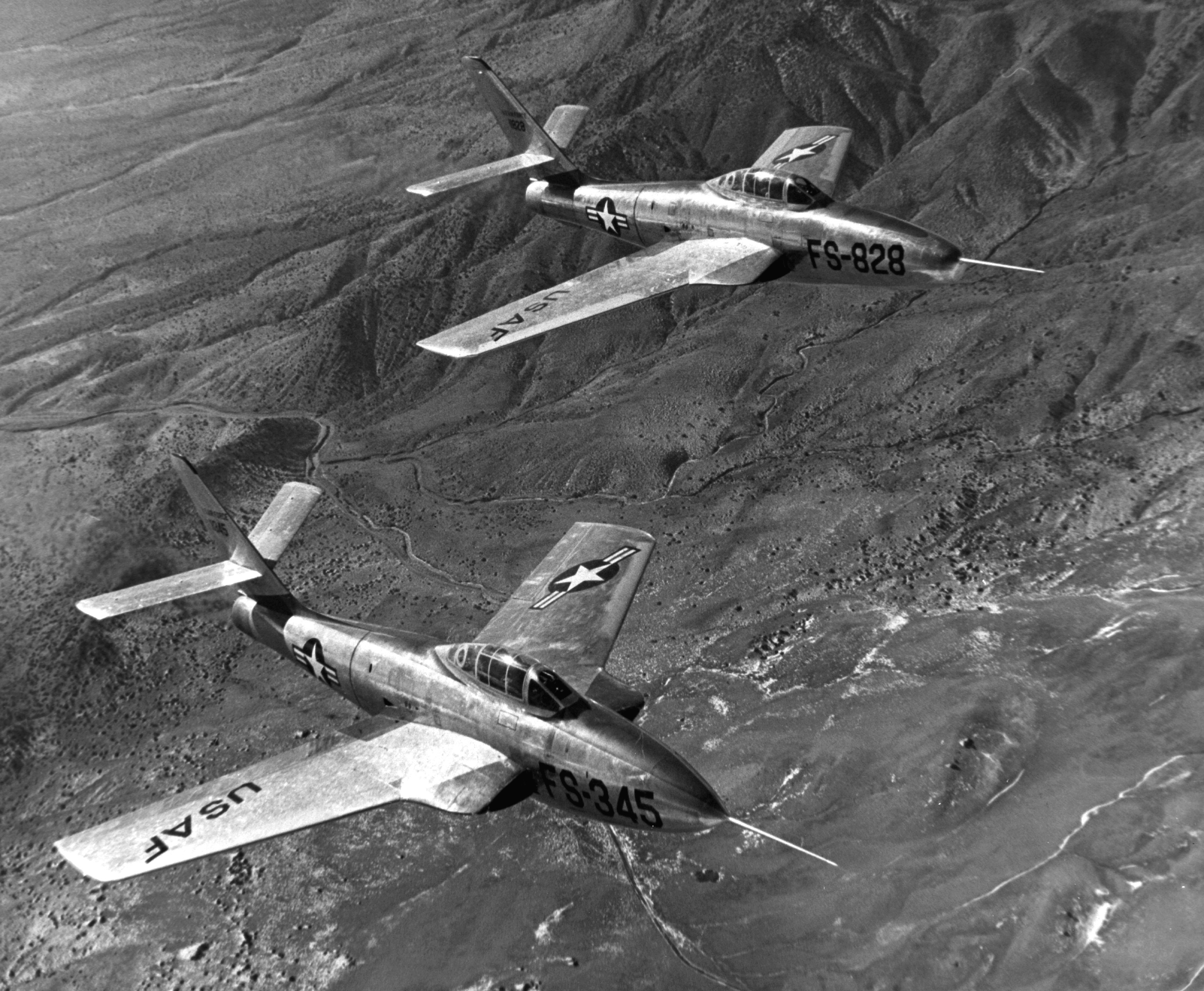
YF-84F and YRF-84F prototypes in 1952. Note the early style wing root jet intakes, which were eventually only retained on the RF-84F, due to the need to fit cameras in the nose. The standard F-84F reverted to the original nose intake due to a loss of thrust from the wing root intakes.

Production of the F-84F proved to be problematic. A key source of difficulty was the aircraft's use of press-forged wing spars and ribs. At this point in time, only three presses in the United States were capable of manufacturing these, and priority had been given to the Boeing B-47 Stratojet strategic bomber over the F-84F. Furthermore, the YJ65-W-1 engine was considered obsolete while the improved J65-W-3 did not become available until 1954. When the first production F-84F finally flew on 22 November 1952, it differed considerably from the service test aircraft. Specifically, it had a different canopy, which opened up and back instead of sliding to the rear (a unique design, the canopy was mounted on a pair of hydraulic rams and a pivoted lever arm that allowed it to lift up and backwards while remaining almost level with the fuselage, instead of the more common simple hinged canopy), as well as airbrakes on the sides of the fuselage instead of the bottom of the aircraft. While tooling commonality with the Thunderjet was supposed to be 55 percent, only fifteen percent of the tooling could be reused in actuality.

The USAF, which hoped to achieve improved high-altitude performance by using a more powerful engine, arranged for the British Armstrong Siddeley Sapphire turbojet engine to be built in the United States as the Wright J65. To accommodate the larger engine, YF-84Fs fitted with a British-built Sapphire as well as production F-84Fs with the J65 had a vertically stretched fuselage, with the air intake attaining an oval cross-section. Persistent delays in the production of the F-84F compelled the USAF to order a number of straight-wing F-84Gs as an interim measure. In addition to Republic's own assembly line, General Motors would independently produce the F-84F as well.

Despite the type having entered series production, the aircraft was considered not ready for operational deployment on account of its control and stability problems. The first 275 aircraft, which were equipped with conventional stabilizer-elevator tailplanes, suffered from accelerated stall pitch-up and poor turning ability while flown at combat speeds. Beginning with Block 25, the F-64F's aerodynamic problems were improved upon through the introduction of a hydraulically-powered single-piece stabilator. A number of aircraft were also retrofitted with spoilers for improved high-speed control. As a result, the F-84F was not declared operational until 12 May 1954; deliveries commenced that same year.

=== Thunderflash ===
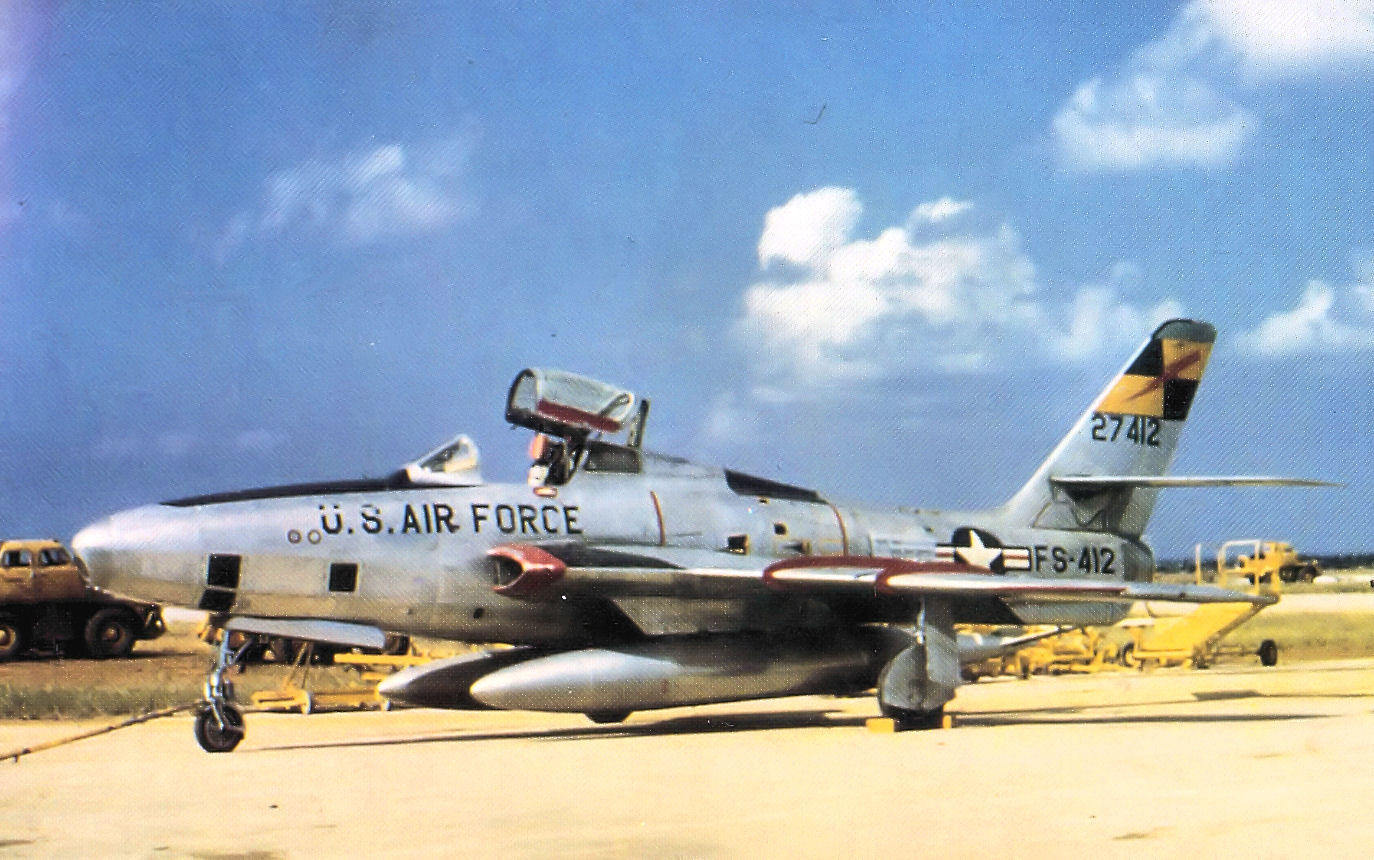
RF-84F Thunderflash, the reconnaissance version of the F-84F. Note the unique articulation of the canopy, which is mounted on a pair of hydraulic rams and a lever arm, allowing it to automatically pivot up and backwards behind the cockpit.

The second YF-84F prototype was completed with wing-root air intakes. While such an arrangement were not adopted for the fighter due to a reduction in thrust, one benefit of such intakes was that it permitted the placement of cameras in the nose. Thus, this feature was adopted for the RF-84F Thunderflash reconnaissance version, which Republic had conducted design studies into at an early stage of development and issued with a contract to proceed in April 1951. The first YRF-84F was completed in February 1952. This aircraft featured a lengthened forward fuselage that could carry up to fifteen cameras in a space that was both air conditioned and heated. Furthermore, in place of the original armament present in the forward upper fuselage, the lower part of each air intake accommodated a machine gun. Innovations included computerized controls which adjusted camera settings for light, speed, and altitude, a periscope to give the pilot better visualization of the target, and a voice recorder to let the pilot narrate his observations. In common with the F-84F, the Thunderflash suffered from the same production delays and engine problems, delaying its entry to service until March 1954.

In excess of 20 Thunderflashes received modifications, including an anhedral horizontal tail and forward fuselage hook, into parasite fighters for a specially-adapted Convair B-36 Peacemaker under the FICON project.

== Design ==
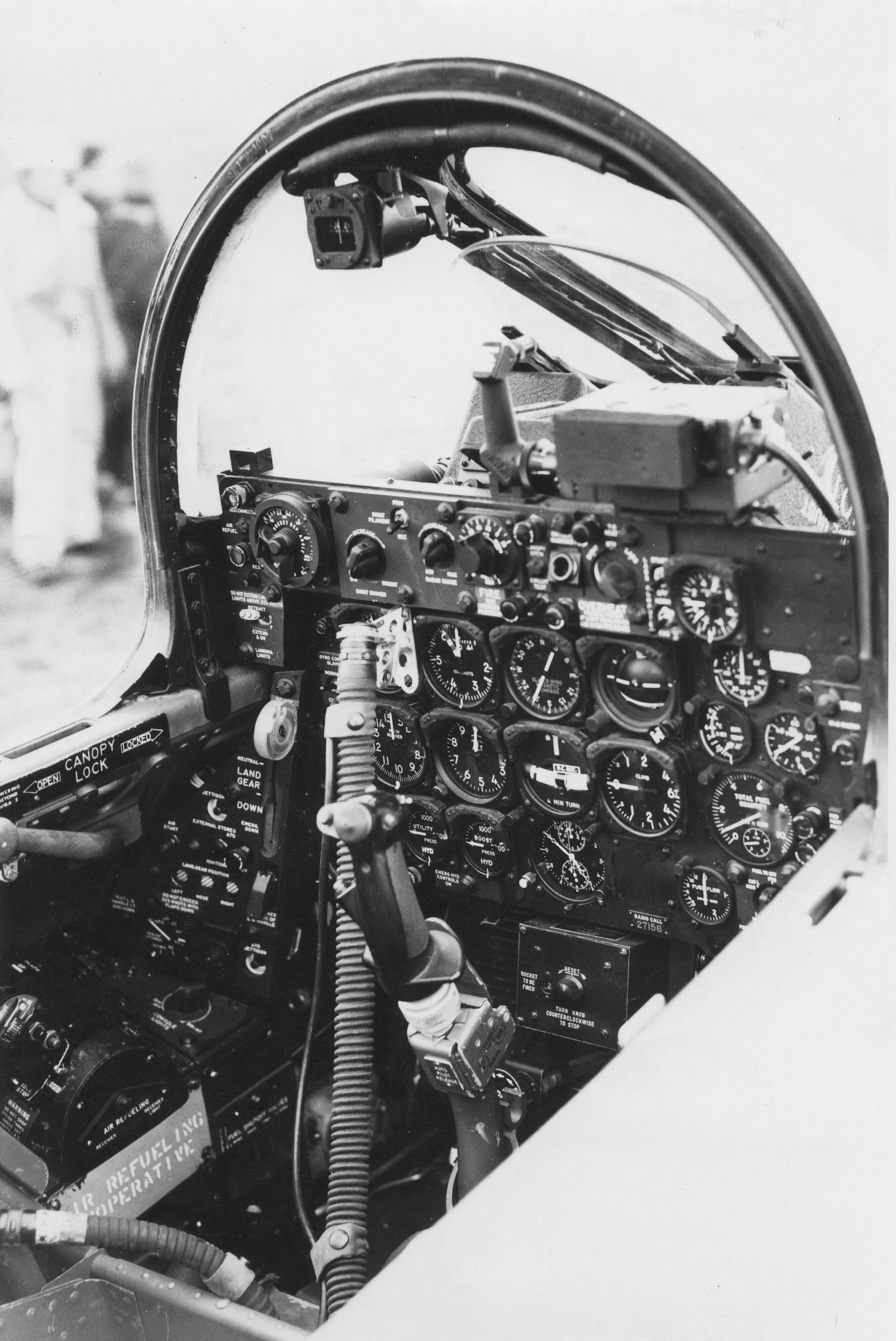
Instrument panel in the F-84F cockpit

The Republic F-84F Thunderstreak was an all-weather fighter-bomber that was capable of delivering both nuclear and conventional weapons; specific armaments included its six .50 in (1,300 mm) Browning M3 machine guns and up to 6,000 pounds (2,700 kg) of rockets and bombs, which potentially included a single Mark 7 nuclear bomb. The aircraft featured a distinctive oval-shaped air intake in the nose, although the dedicated reconnaissance model were fitted with a solid nose and made use of horizontal intakes on each side of the fuselage at the wing root instead. When required, RATO (rocket-assisted take-off) was available on all models using mounting points on the lower fuselage for the rocket boosters. For additional range, a pair of long-range fuel tanks could be carried, one under each wing.

The Thunderstreak suffered from the same poor takeoff performance as the straight-wing Thunderjet despite having a more powerful engine. In reality, almost 700 pounds-force (3.11 kN) or ten percent of total thrust was lost because the J65 was installed at an angle and its jet pipe was not perfectly straight (in addition to the usual thrust losses from the long jet pipe). On a hot day, 7,500 feet (2,300 m) of runway were required for takeoff roll. A typical takeoff speed was 160 knots (180 mph; 300 km/h). Like the Thunderjet, the Thunderstreak excelled at cruise and had predictable handling characteristics within its performance envelope. Like its predecessor, it also suffered from accelerated stall pitch-up and potential resulting separation of wings from the airplane. In addition, spins in the F-84F were practically unrecoverable and ejection was the only recourse below 10,000 feet (3,000 m).

While many aircraft were delivered with a bare metal finish, some operators chose to apply camouflage patterns.

== Operational history ==
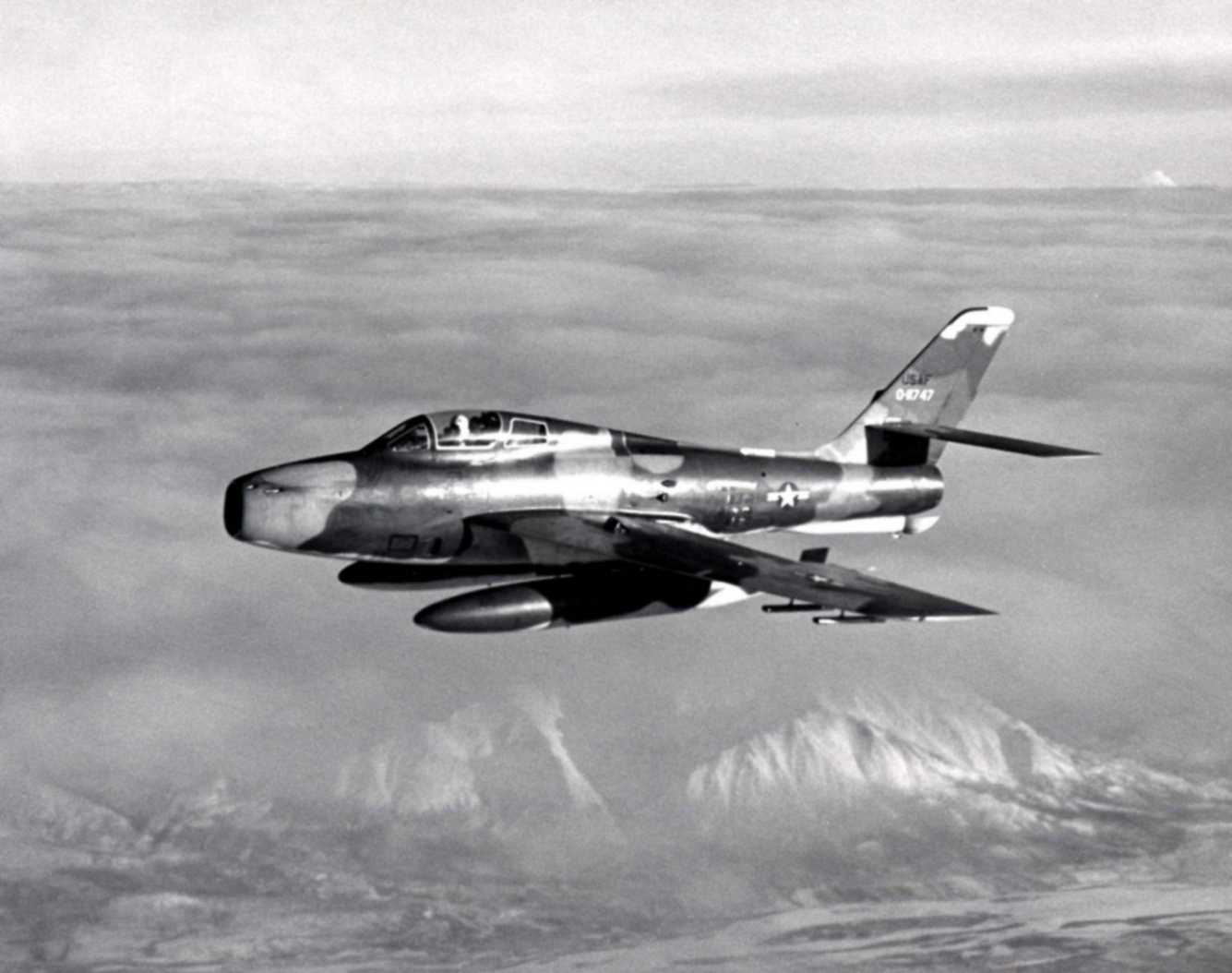
An Ohio Air National Guard F-84F in the late 1960s

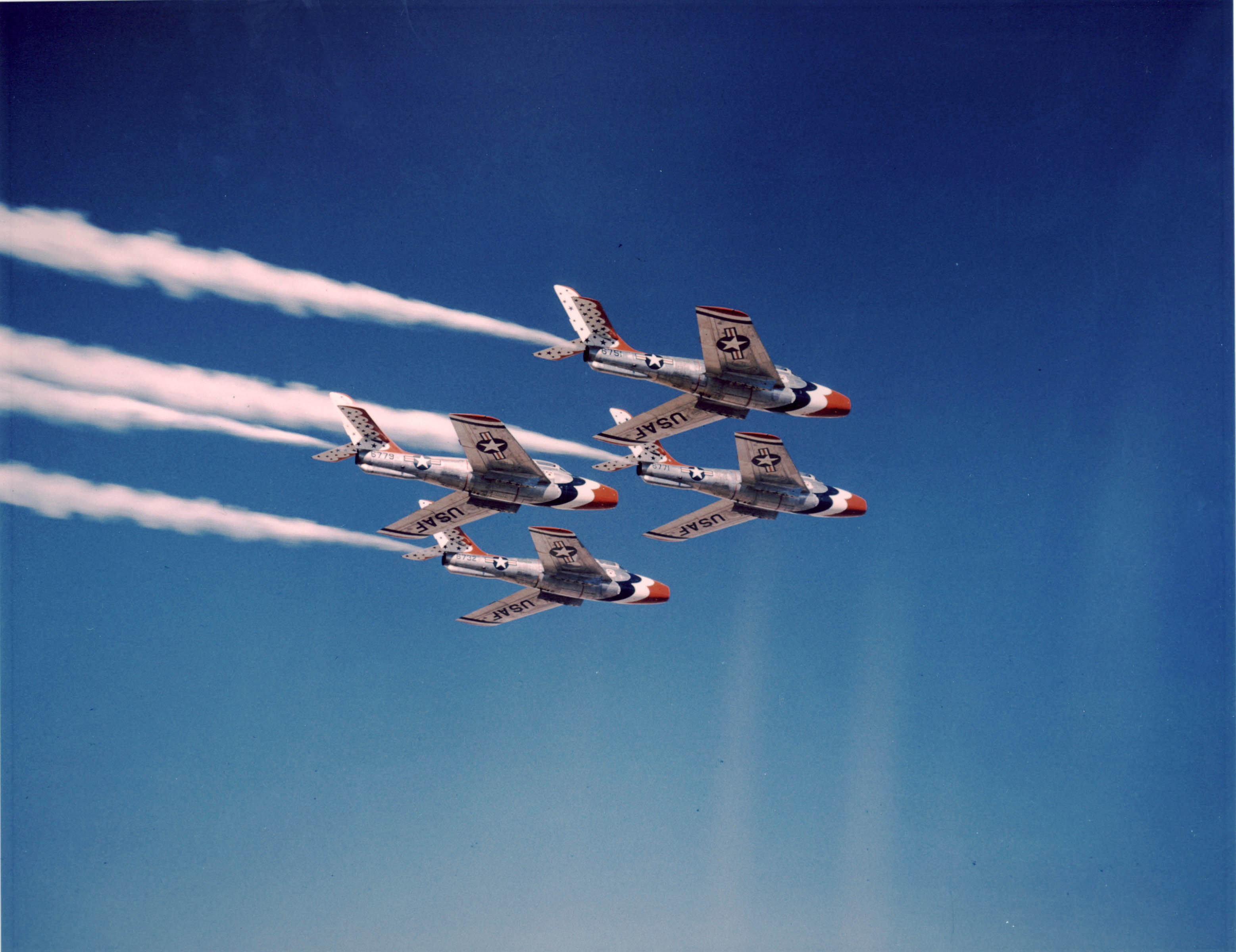
F-84F Thunderstreaks flown by USAF Thunderbirds

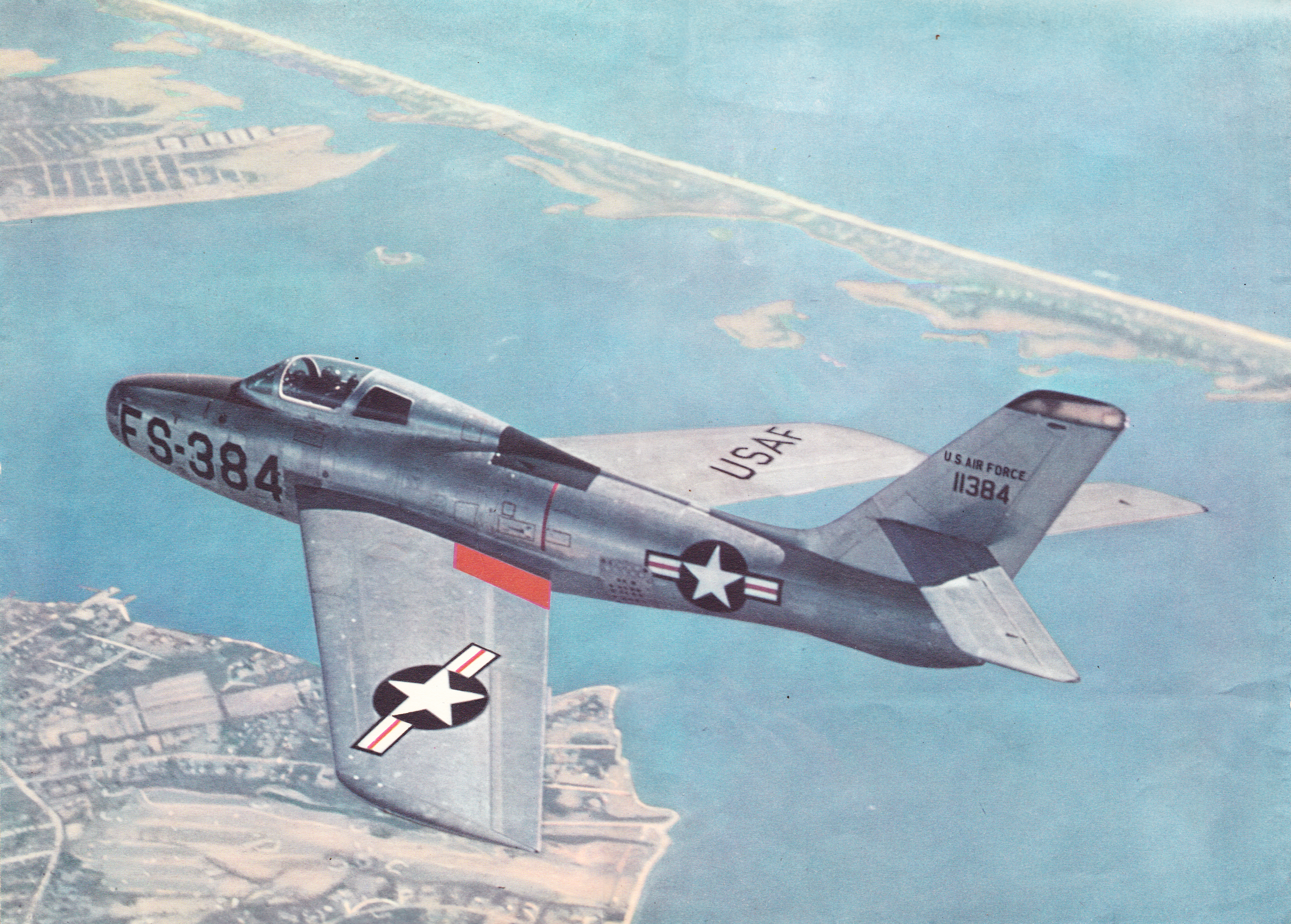
F-84F

In November 1954, Project Run In completed operational tests on the aircraft, determining it to be considerably better than the F-84G and to have satisfied the USAF. On 9 March 1955, Lt. Col. Robert R. Scott, while flying a F-84F, set a three-hour, 44-minute and 53-second record for the 2,446 miles (3,936 km) flight between Los Angeles and New York.

Even after entering USAF service, the aircraft was troubled by persistent engine failures resulted in the entire fleet being grounded in early 1955. The J65 engine continued to suffer from flameouts when flying through heavy rain or snow. As the result of these problems, active duty phaseout of the type began almost as soon as the F-84F entered service in 1954, and was completed by 1958. However, the type's phaseout proved to be temporary on account of increasing tensions in the Cold War over Germany in 1961, which included the construction of the Berlin Wall that same year, which motivated the USAF to reactivate its mothballed F-84F fleet. In 1962, the fleet was again grounded after the discovery of corrosion on the aircraft's control rods. A total of 1,800 man hours were expended to perform remedial work for the type to return to full operational capacity.

Following the introduction of the Republic F-105 Thunderchief fighter-bomber, which used wing-root mounted air intakes of a similar design to those fitted on the RF-84F, the photo-recon variant Thunderflash became known as the Thud's Mother.

In addition to its domestic use, the F-84F proved to be an export success, entering service with numerous operators across Europe. The French Air Force took delivery of their first F-84Fs during 1955 and declared the type operational that same year. One year later, France deployed their aircraft into combat against Egypt during the Suez Crisis, flying from bases in Israel and Cyprus. The type was credited was destroying numerous Warsaw Pact-supplied Ilyushin Il-28 bombers at Luxor. Furthermore, French RF-84Fs performed tactical reconnaissance flights, repeatedly flying at medium to low altitudes over the theatre in October and November 1956. The French Air Force opted to withdraw their remaining F-84Fs in 1963, having replaced it with the domestically-developed Dassault Mirage III.

Relatively few air-to-air engagements involving the F-84F occurred during its operational life. On 16 August 1962, a pair of Turkish Air Force F-84Fs engaged and shot down two Iraqi Air Force Ilyushin Il-28s that had crossed into Turkish airspace by mistake during a bombing operation against Iraqi Kurdish insurgents.

The F-84F was retired from active service with the USAF in 1964; it was replaced by the newer North American F-100 Super Sabre. The RF-84F was replaced by the McDonnell RF-101 Voodoo in USAF units, after which the type was relegated to duty in the Air National Guard. The last RF-84F was withdrawn by the ANG in 1971. The final operator of the aircraft was the Hellenic Air Force, which retired its final three RF-84Fs in 1991.

== Variants ==
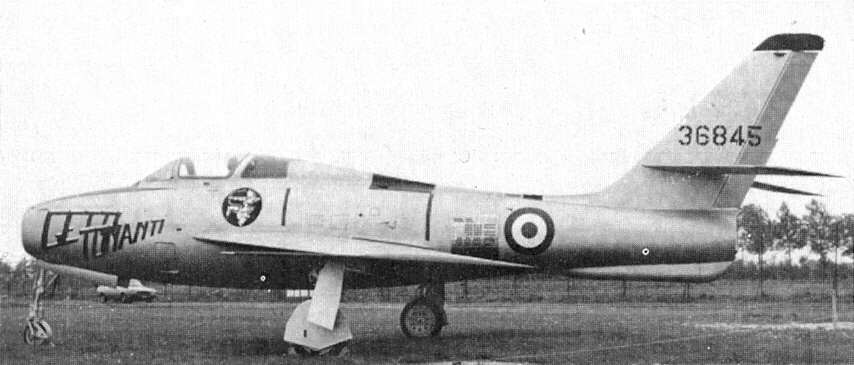
An Italian F-84F

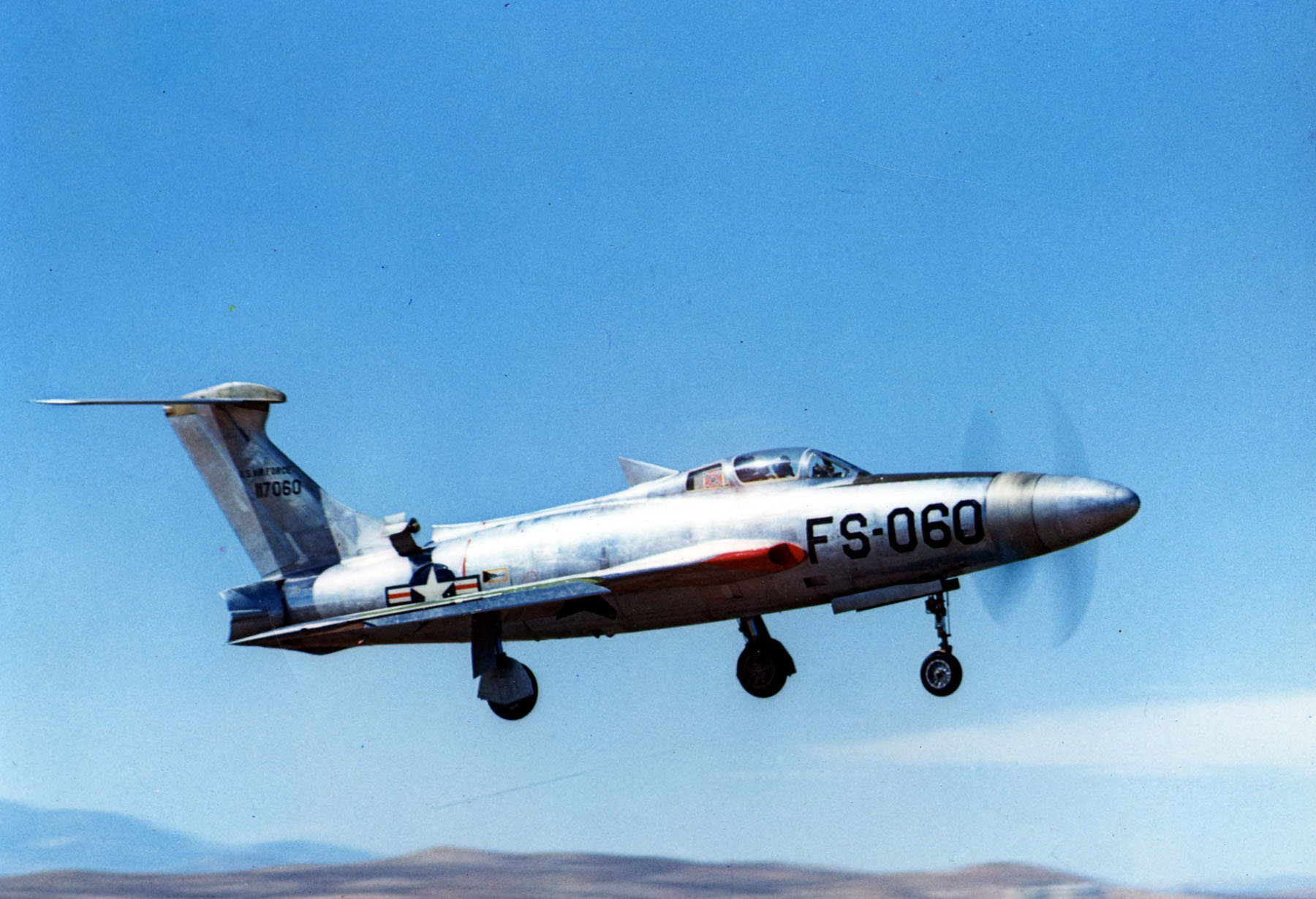
The Republic XF-84H Thunderscreech prototype

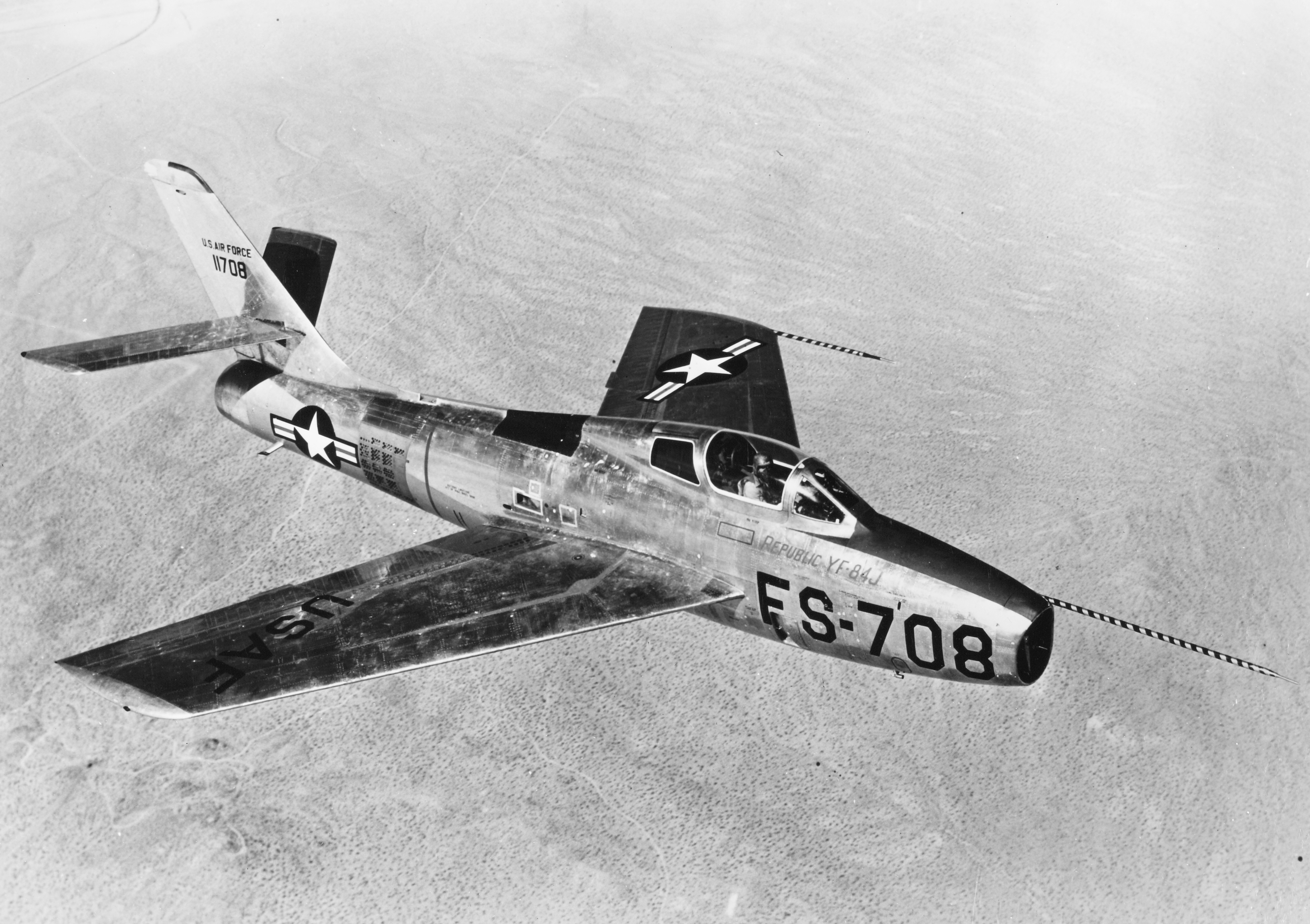
One of the YF-84J prototypes

YF-84F
Two swept-wing prototypes of the F-84F, initially designated YF-96.
F-84F Thunderstreak
Swept wing version with Wright J65 engine. Tactical Air Command aircraft were equipped with Low-Altitude Bombing System (LABS) for delivering nuclear bombs. 2,711 built, 1,301 aircraft went to NATO under Mutual Defense Assistance Program (MDAP).
GRF-84F
25 RF-84Fs were converted to be carried, and launched from the bomb bay of a GRB-36F bomber as part of the FICON project. The aircraft were later redesignated RF-84K.
RF-84F Thunderflash
Reconnaissance version of the F-84F with intakes relocated to the wing-roots, 715 built.
RF-84K Thunderflash (FICON)
RF-84F with a retractable probe for hookup with carrier GRB-36Ds and tailplanes with marked anhedral, 25 redesignated from RF-84F.
XF-84H
Two F-84Fs were converted into experimental aircraft. Each was fitted with an Allison XT40-A-1 turboprop engine of 5,850 shaft horsepower (4,365 kW) driving a supersonic propeller. Ground crews dubbed the XF-84H the Thunderscreech due to its extreme noise output.
YF-84J
Two F-84Fs were converted into YF-84J prototypes with enlarged nose intakes and a deepened fuselages for the General Electric J73 engine; the YF-84J reached Mach 1.09 in level flight on 7 April 1954. The project was cancelled due to the excessive cost of converting existent F-84Fs.

== Operators ==
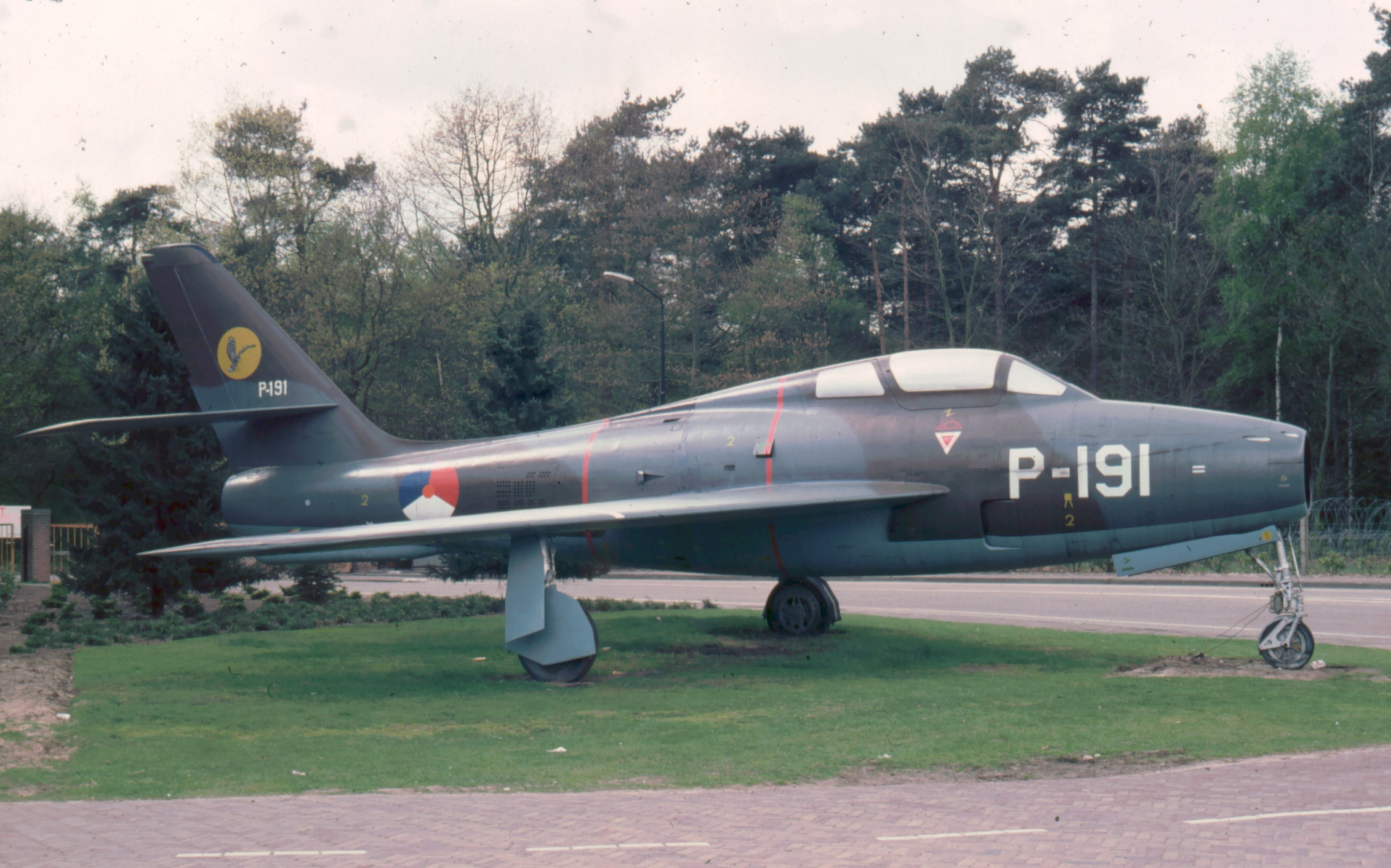
Royal Netherlands Air Force F-84F

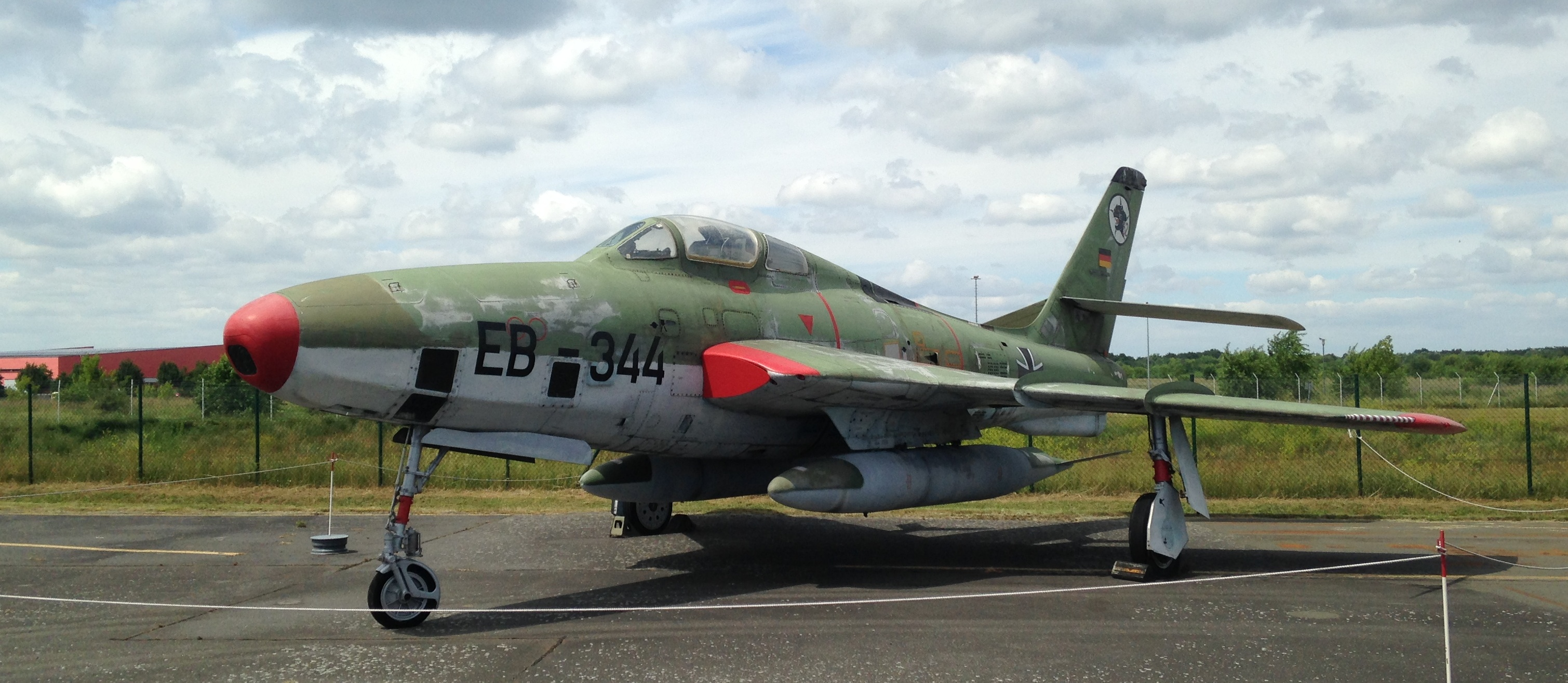
Republic RF-84F Thunderflash at Militärhistorisches Museum Flugplatz Berlin-Gatow, Berlin, Germany; note the distinctive Republic-type wing root intakes that led to the RF-84F being called "Thud's Mother", due to the use of similar intakes on the later Republic F-105 Thunderchief

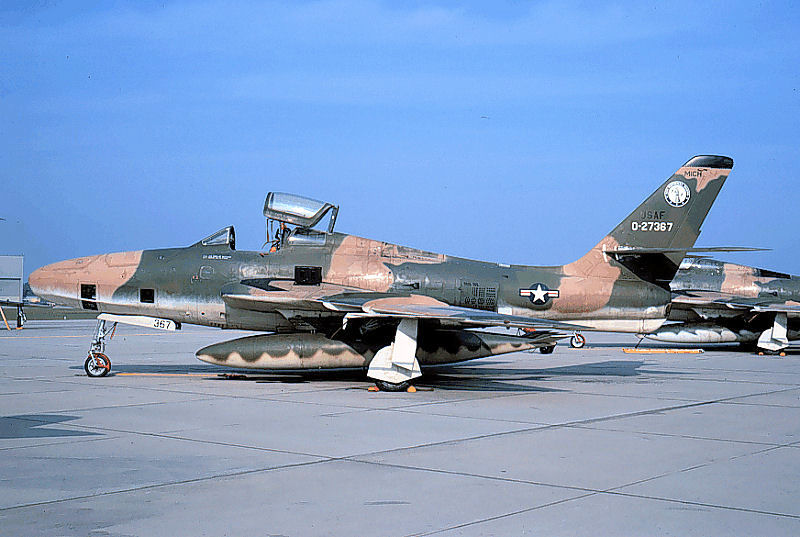
A Michigan Air National Guard RF-84F

Belgium

- Belgian Air Force - 197 x F-84F, 34 x RF-84F operated from 1955.

Denmark

- Royal Danish Air Force - 23× RF-84F received, in service from 1957 to 1971.

France

- French Air Force - 328 F-84Fs and 88 RF-84Fs received from 1955.

Germany

- West German Air Force - 450 F-84Fs and 108 RF-84Fs received. In service from 1956 to 1966.

Greece

- Greek Air Force

Israel

- Israeli Air Force - 18 French F-84Fs along with their pilots were temporarily transferred to the IAF during the Suez Crisis.

Italy

- Italian Air Force - operated 194 Republic F-84F Thunderstreak and 78 RF-84F Thunderflash from 1956 until 1974

Netherlands

- Royal Netherlands Air Force (180× F-84F, 24× RF-84F 1955–1970)

Norway

- Royal Norwegian Air Force (35× RF-84F 1956–1970)

Taiwan (Republic of China)

- Republic of China Air Force - About 25 RF-84Fs operated from 1954.

Turkey

- Turkish Air Force

United States

- United States Air Force (1496× F-84F, 388× RF-84F 1952–1972)

== Accidents and incidents ==
- On 7 July 1954, one F-84F of a flight of four en route to Bergstrom Air Force Base in Austin, TX, crashed into the Kansas City, Kansas business district shortly after departing Fairfax Municipal Airport, Kansas City, KS. 2nd Lt. John H. Kapeles, pilot, assigned to the 27th Fighter Escort Wing, died in the crash. Three civilians died on the ground when the plane crashed onto their homes. The plane had just come off the General Motors Fairfax Assembly Plant production line and had been test flown. Eyewitnesses reported that the plane plunged at a high speed toward the ground after the flight had banked toward the west from the east. The three remaining planes returned to Fairfax Municipal Airport.
- On 9 December 1955, a USAF F-84F on an instrument training flight from RAF Sculthorpe in Norfolk experienced a flameout and the pilot ejected. The aircraft crashed into Lodge Moor Hospital, Sheffield. The crash killed one patient and injured seven others.
- On 19 February 1956 1st Lt Thomas W. Sonnett a pilot for the Air National Guard and an officer in the 146th Fighter Interceptor Squadron based out of the Pittsburgh International Airport. Returning from a routine training flight Sonnett experienced a flameout at 2500 ft. Rather than bailout over populated areas, he announced to his wingman that he was going to try and "crash it". Sonnett was able to make it as far as an open farm field just a few miles from base but, seconds before reaching the ground his landing gear clipped some trees. Sonnett, age 32, did not survive the crash. He died just 1 mile from his home where his wife and children had been awaiting his return.
- On 4 April 1957, the USAF Captain Richard W. Higgins died after a low ejection near the Fürstenfeldbruck Air Base. He was flying one of the first F-84Fs of the German Air Force.
- On 1 August 1960, Captain Finn Erik Andersen of the Royal Norwegian Air Force flying F-84F Thunderflash registration T3-S crashed into the Styggmann peak of Skrimfjella in Southern Norway. The pilot was killed. As of 2023, some wreckage remains on the mountain.
- On 20 November 1960 a F-84F Thunderstreak of the Royal Netherlands Air Force crashed at 7:50pm into a farm in Lutjelollum between Wjelsryp and Franeker, the Netherlands. The pilot and the family of six people who lived at the farm were all killed. The farm was destroyed and burned down and the livestock was killed.
- On 14 September 1961, two West German F-84Fs of the West German Luftwaffe crossed into East German airspace due to a navigational error, eventually landing at Berlin Tegel Airport, evading a large number of Soviet fighter aircraft. The event came at a historically difficult time during the Cold War, one month after the construction of the Berlin Wall.
- On 28 January 1962, the USAF Lieutenant Donald Slack died after striking a 6,188 ft (1,886 m) (ASL) mountain in central France in his F-84F of the New Jersey Air National Guard. The book Stranger to the Ground by Richard Bach was dedicated to him.

== Aircraft on display ==
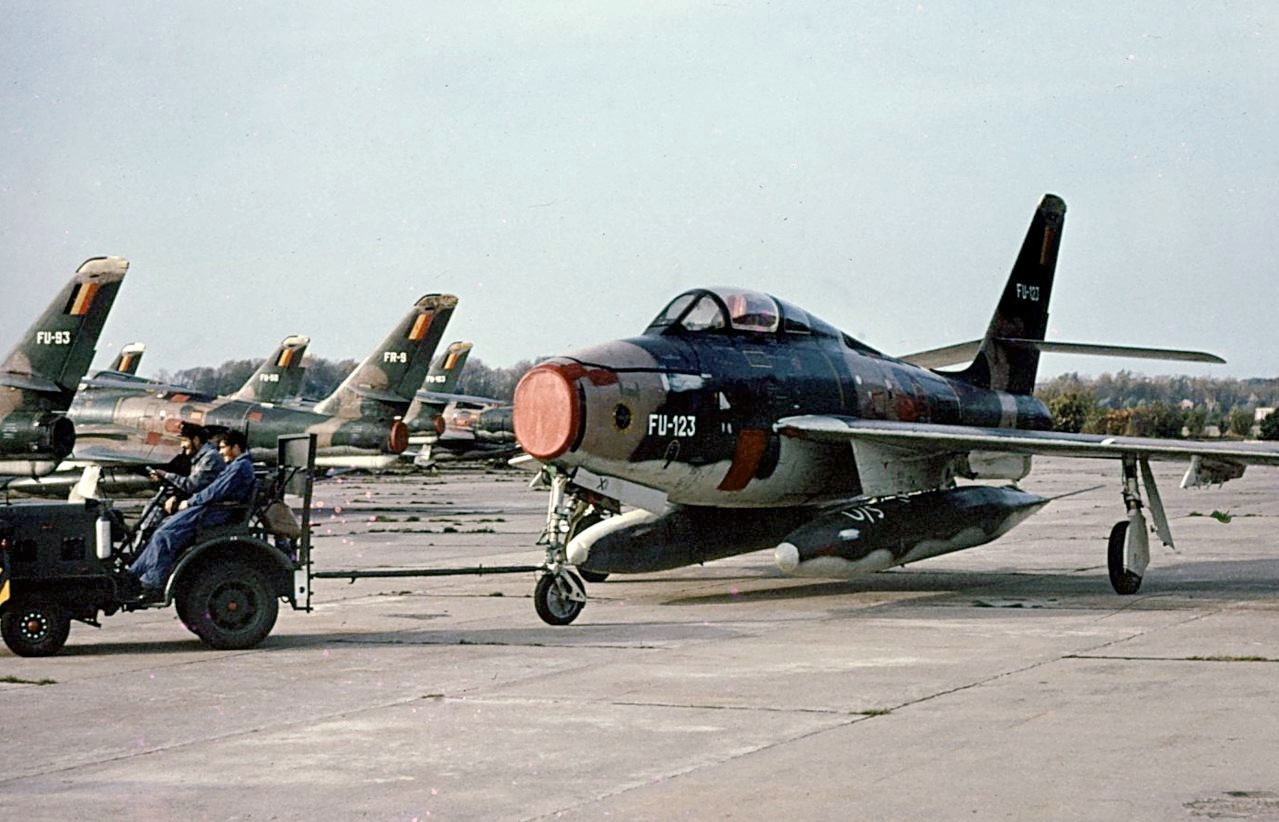
Belgian Air Force Thunderstreaks

=== Belgium ===
F-84F Thunderstreak

- 52-6584 – FU-197, Balen-Keiheuvel Aerodrome
- 52-7169 – FU-30, Royal Museum of the Armed Forces and Military History in Brussels
- 53-6677 – FU-66, Kleine Brogel Air Base
- 53-6888 – FU-177, Leopoldsburg/Beverlo Airfield

=== Denmark ===
RF-84F

- C-581 – Flyvestation Karup Historiske Forening Museet, Karup
- C-264 – Danish Collection of Vintage Aircraft, Skjern

=== Germany ===
F-84F Thunderstreak

- tactical number DC-101 - behind main gate, inside Büchel AB, Büchel.
- tactical number DD-113 – at the entrance road towards Memmingen Airport

=== Greece ===
F-84F Thunderstreak

- tactical number 26-595 - Hellenic Air Force Museum (Μουσείο Πολεμικής Αεροπορίας)
- tactical number 37-050 - Larissa air base
- tactical number 37-182 (s/n 53-7182) - Rentina Agrafon (Ρεντίνα Αγράφων).
- tactical number 37-216 (s/n 53-7216) - War Museum, Athens

RF-84F Thunderflash

- tactical number 17-011 (s/n 51-17011 - ex-Luftwaffe) - Hellenic Air Force Museum (Μουσείο Πολεμικής Αεροπορίας)

=== Italy ===
F-84F

- 53-6892 – Italian Air Force Museum, Vigna di Valle near Rome.
- D100 - Museo Nazionale Scienza e Tecnologia Leonardo da Vinci, Milan.

RF-84F Thunderflash

- 52-7458 – Italian Air Force Museum, Vigna di Valle.

=== Netherlands ===
F-84F

- 52-7185 - P-134, in storage at ROCvA Airport College, Hoofddorp
- 53-6600 - P-254, in storage at Nationaal Militair Museum, Soesterberg
- 53-6612 - P-226, on display at Nationaal Militair Museum, Soesterberg

RF-84F

- 51-11253 - TP-19, in storage at Nationaal Militair Museum, Soesterberg

=== Poland ===
F-84F

- 52-7157 (Ex-Belgium) – Polish Aviation Museum, Kraków

=== Turkey ===
F-84F

- 52-8733 – Istanbul Aviation Museum

RF-84F

- 51-1860 - Bursa Uludag University
- 51-1901 – Istanbul Aviation Museum
- 51-1917 – Istanbul Aviation Museum

=== United Kingdom ===
F-84F

- 52-6541 – North East Land, Sea and Air Museums, Sunderland
- 52-7133 - Bentwaters Cold War Museum

=== United States ===
XF-84F

- 49-2430 – National Museum of the United States Air Force, Dayton, Ohio

F-84F

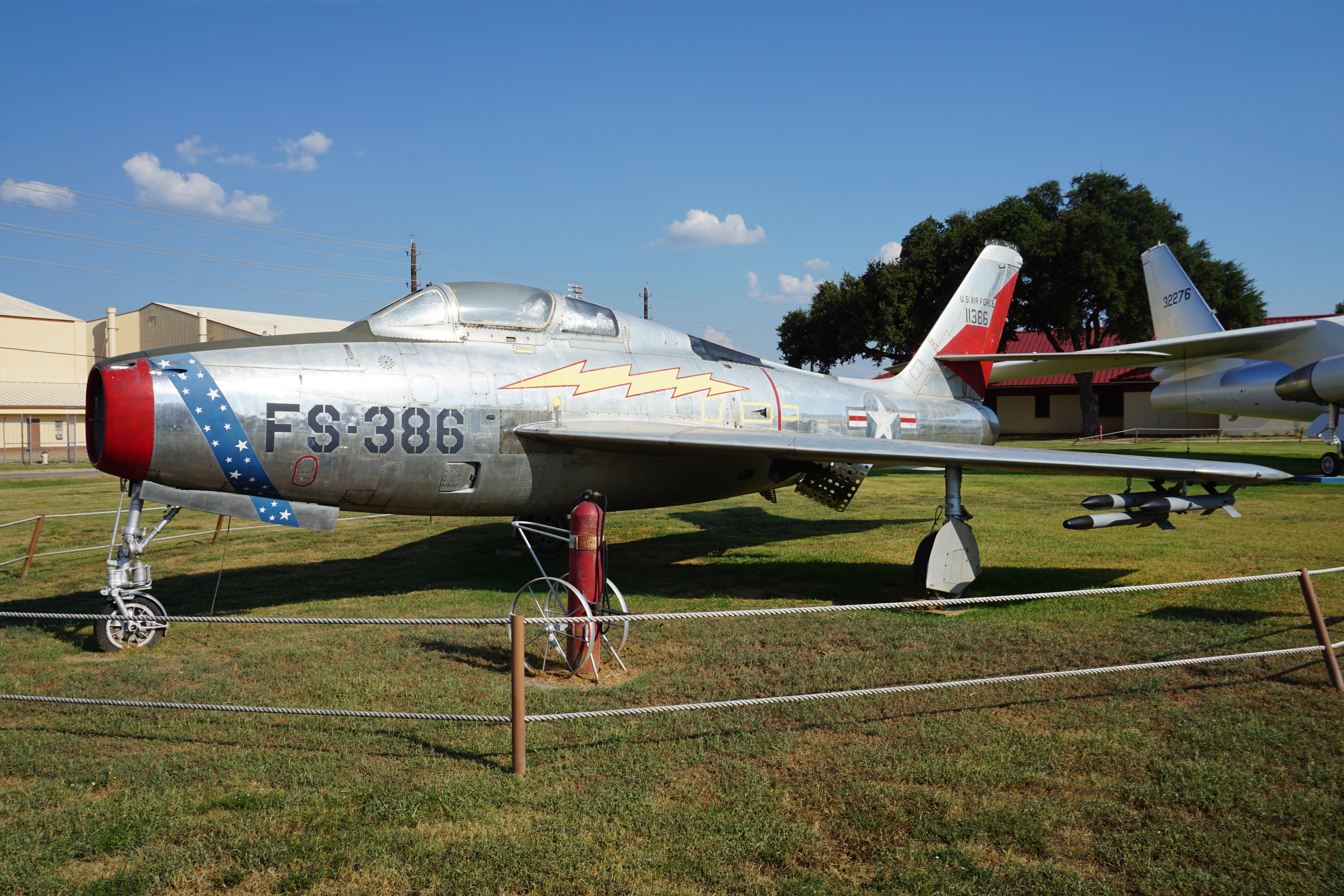
F-84F at the Barksdale Global Power Museum

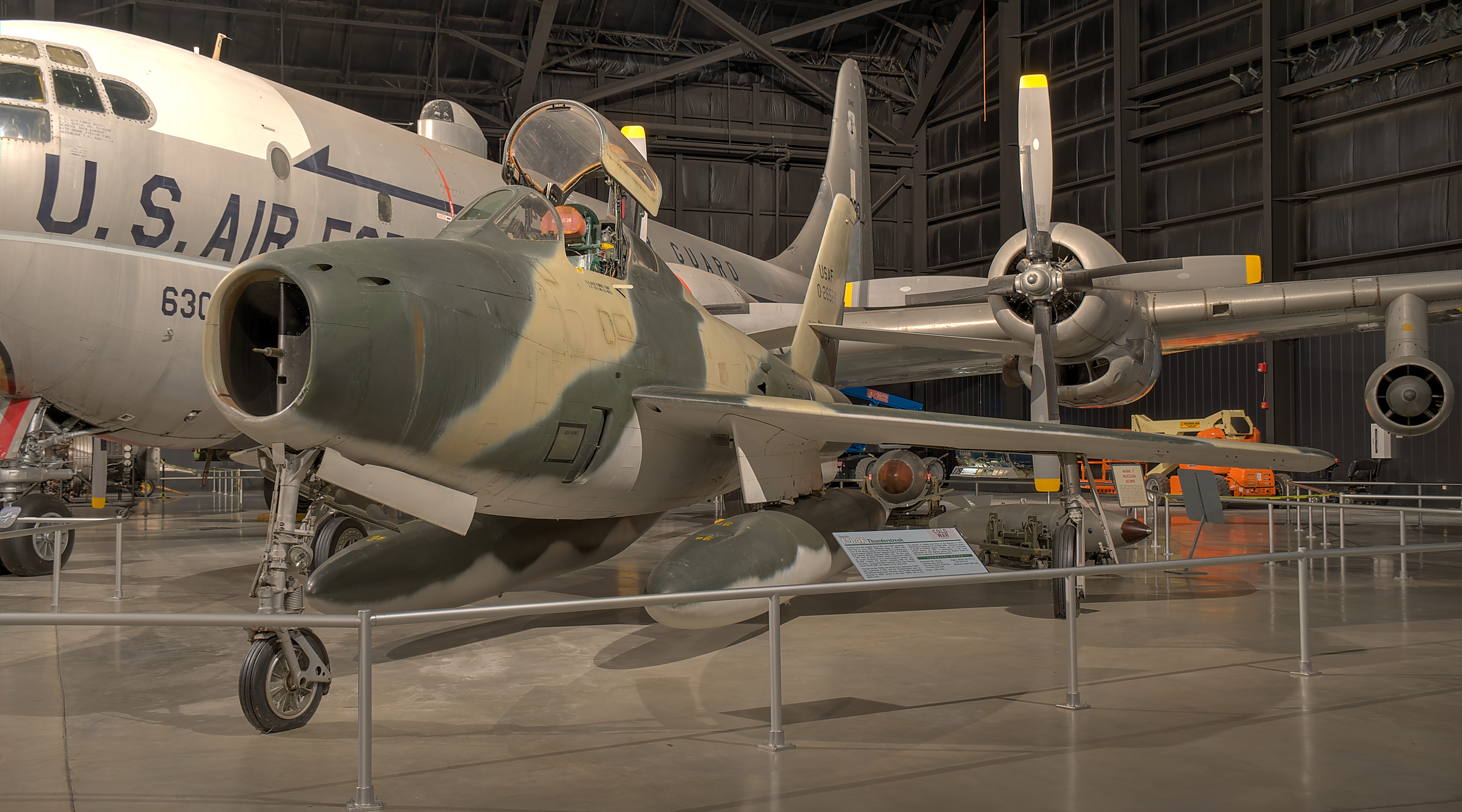
F-84F at the National Museum of the United States Air Force; note the .50 (12.7 mm) caliber machine gun muzzle openings in the nose (4) and wing roots (2).

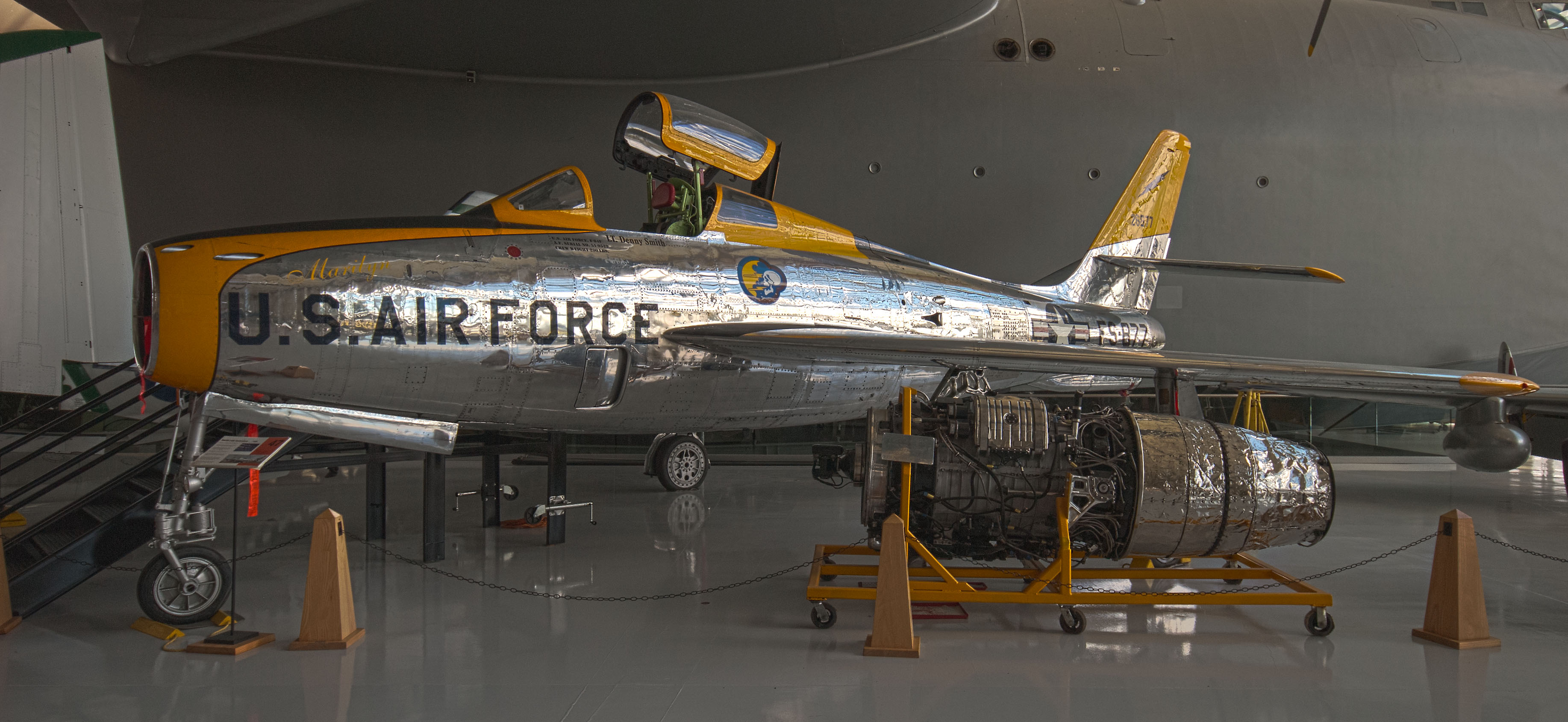
Republic F-84F Thunderstreak from the Evergreen Aviation & Space Museum

- 51-1386 – Barksdale Global Power Museum, Barksdale AFB, Louisiana
- 51-1620 – Empire State Aerosciences Museum in Glenville, New York
- 51-1640 – Hill Aerospace Museum, Hill AFB, Utah
- 51-1659 – Combat Air Museum, Topeka Regional Airport at Forbes Field, Topeka, Kansas
- 51-1714 – Strategic Air Command & Aerospace Museum in Ashland, Nebraska
- 51-1739 – Korean War memorial South Whitley, Indiana
- 51-1772 – Aerospace Museum of California in McClellan, California
- 51-1786 – Virginia Air & Space Center in Hampton, Virginia
- 51-9350 – Air Force Flight Test Center Museum at Edwards AFB, California
- 51-9396 – Holloman AFB, New Mexico.
- 51-9432 – March Field Air Museum in Riverside, California
- 51-9433 – Castle Air Museum in Atwater, California
- 51-9495 – Air Force Armament Museum, Eglin AFB, Florida
- 51-9501 – Yankee Air Museum, Belleville, Michigan
- 51-9531 – Palm Springs Air Museum, Palm Springs, California, formerly at Octave Chanute Aerospace Museum in Rantoul, Illinois
- 52-6385 – VFW Post 2503, Omaha, Nebraska.
- 52-6455 – American Legion post #490, Houston, Texas
- 52-6526 – National Museum of the United States Air Force in Dayton, Ohio
- 52-6553 – Window on the Plains Museum in Dumas, Texas
- 52-6555 – Wings of Freedom Aviation Museum in Horsham, Pennsylvania
- 52-6563 – Pima Air & Space Museum in Tucson, Arizona
- 52-6701 – Museum of Aviation, Robins AFB, Georgia
- 52-6993 – Wilbur Wright Birthplace and Museum near Millville, Indiana.
- 52-8886 – South Dakota Air and Space Museum at Ellsworth AFB, South Dakota
- 52-9089 – Kansas Aviation Museum, Wichita, Kansas

RF-84F Thunderflash

- 51-1944 – Pima Air & Space Museum in Tucson, Arizona
- 51-1948 – Harlan Airport (HNR) in Harlan, Iowa.
- 52-7259 – National Museum of the United States Air Force in Dayton, Ohio
- 52-7265 – Planes of Fame Museum in Chino, California
- 52-7421 – Yankee Air Museum, Belleville, Michigan

== Specifications (F-84F) ==
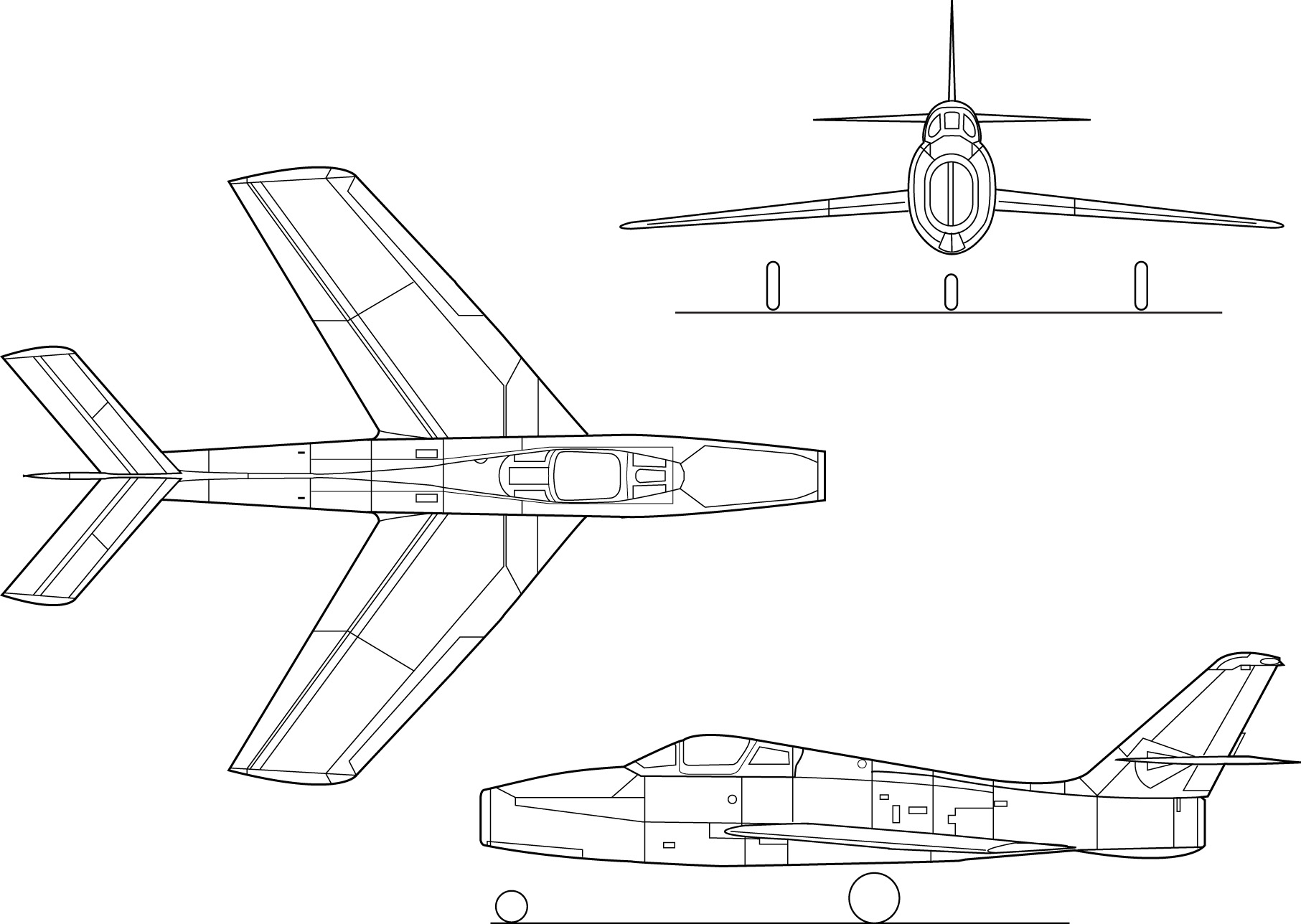
3-view line drawing of the Republic F-84F Thunderstreak

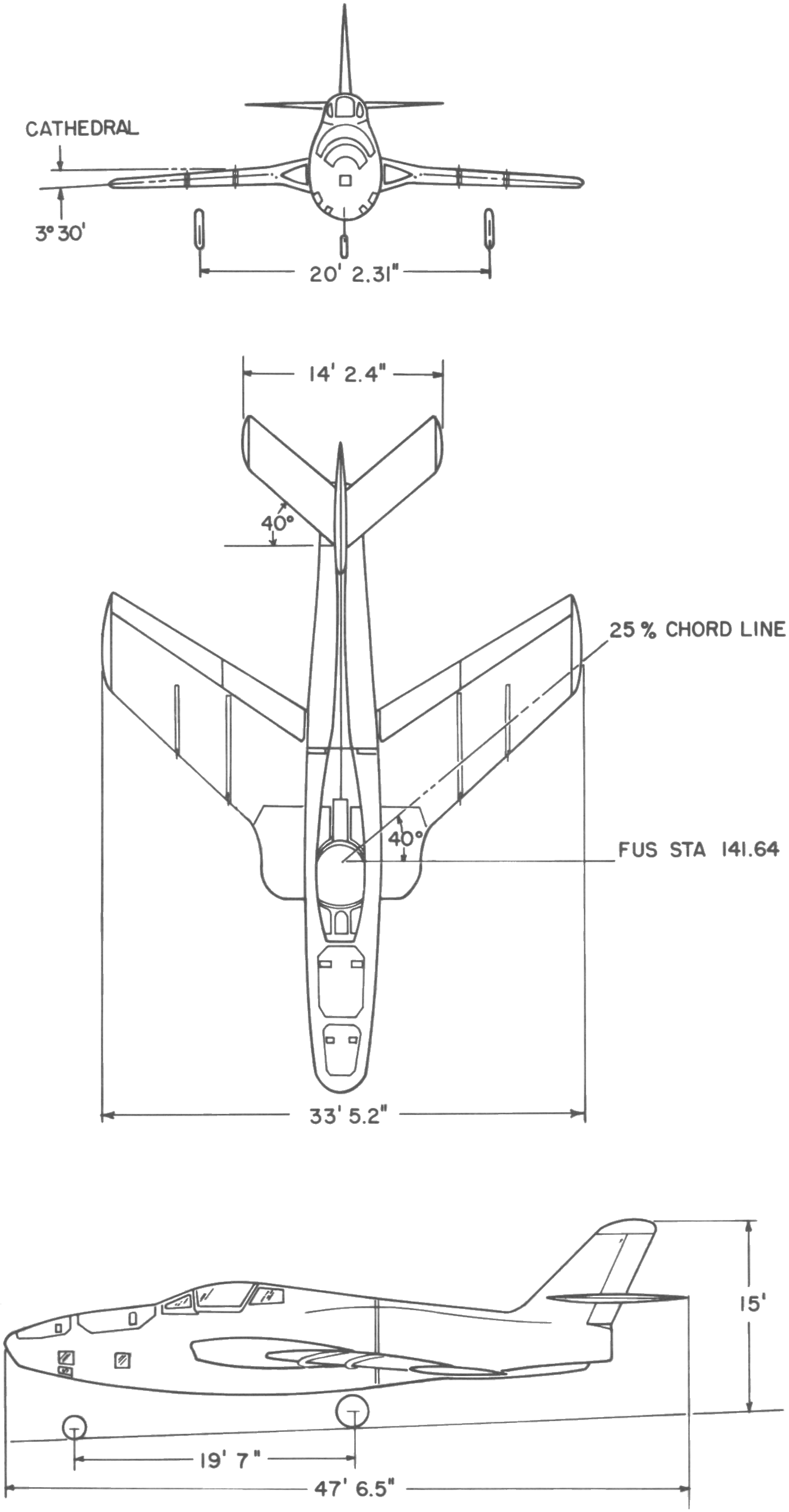
3-view line drawing of the Republic RF-84F Thunderflash

Data from Fighters of the United States Air Force, Combat Aircraft since 1945

General characteristics

- Crew: 1
- Length: 43 ft 4.75 in (13.23 m)
- Wingspan: 33 ft 7.25 in (10.25 m)
- Height: 14 ft 4.75 in (4.39 m)
- Wing area: 325 sq ft (30 m^{2})
- Empty weight: 13,830 lb (6,200 kg)
- Max takeoff weight: 28,000 lb (12,701 kg)
- Powerplant: 1 × Wright J65-W-3 turbojet, 7,220 lbf (32.1 kN) thrust

Performance

- Maximum speed: 695 mph (1,119 km/h, 604 kn) at sea level
- Range: 810 mi (1,304 km, 704 nmi) combat radius with two droptanks
- Service ceiling: 46,000 ft (14,000 m)
- Rate of climb: 8,200 ft/min (42 m/s)
- Wing loading: 86 lb/sq ft (423 kg/m^{2})

Armament

- 6× .50 in (1,300 mm) Browning M3 machine guns, four mounted in nose over intake, two mounted in the wing roots, 1,800 rounds total
- Up to 6,000 pounds (2,700 kg) of rockets and bombs, including one Mark 7 nuclear bomb

Avionics

- A-1CM or A-4 gunsight with AN/APG-30 or MK-18 fire-control radar
- AN/ARC-33 or AN/ARC-34 – UHF command radio transceiver
- AN/APN-21 – TACAN set
- AN/APW-11/11A – Radar transponder
- AN/APX-6/6A – IFF Mark X (SIF) transponder
- AN/ARN-6 – Radio compass

== Notable appearances in media ==
Richard Bach, who later wrote the bestseller Jonathan Livingston Seagull, was an ANG F-84F pilot who was once activated for duty in Europe. His first book, Stranger to the Ground, described in detail what it was like to fly the Thunderstreak in the course of an operational flight at night from England to France in adverse weather.

F-84Fs were also used to represent North Korean MiG-15 fighters in the 1958 film version of James Salters' novel "The Hunters", because none of the Soviet fighters were available during the ongoing Cold War for filming. They were painted a flat gray with red star insignia.

== See also ==
Related development

- Republic F-84 Thunderjet
- Republic F-105 Thunderchief
- Republic XF-84H Thunderscreech
- Republic XF-91 Thunderceptor
- RF-84K FICON

Aircraft of comparable role, configuration, and era

- CAC Sabre
- Dassault Mystère
- de Havilland Venom
- Grumman F-9 Cougar
- Saab 32 Lansen
