= Hoogholtje =

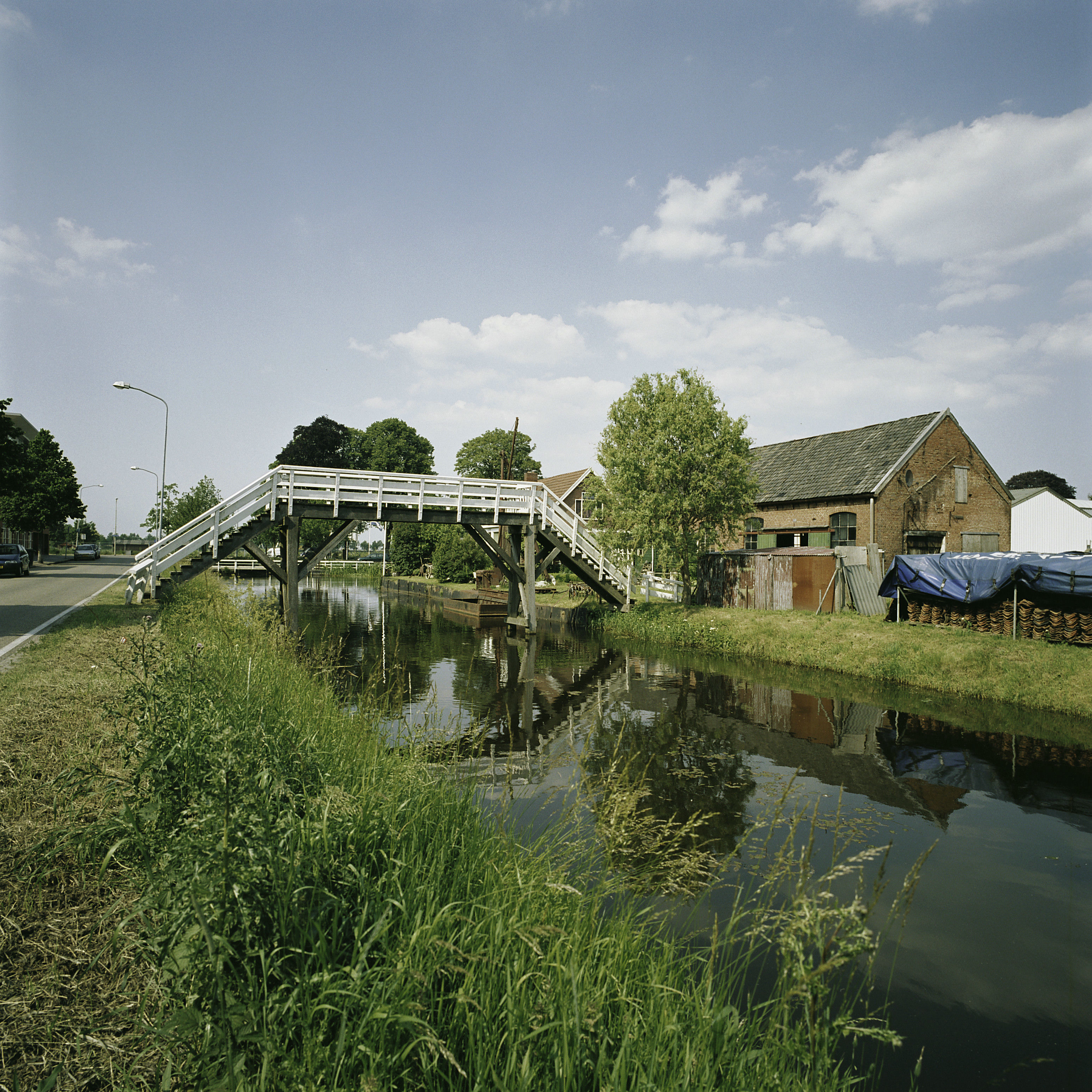
Hoogholtje bridge in Sappemeer, Netherlands

A hoogholtje (Dutch Low Saxon for small high wood; Dutch: hooghout; Frysian: heechholt) is a typical footbridge in the Dutch province of Groningen. In the West of the Netherlands, the same model bridge is named kwakel, kwakker, or kwakeltje. In Friesland, the bridge type is known as a heechhout.

This type of bridge is high enough for small boats and low barges to pass below, as required since the 14th century. On both ends, there are usually stairs or sometimes ramps, to ascend or descend, between crossbar railings. While most of these bridges are made of wood, some are of concrete or steel. The bridges are narrow, so a person can pass these with a bike, but horses with a carriage could not. Larger boats can not pass under because the structure does not move. Hence, over the years many Hoogholtjes have been replaced by larger, movable bridges.

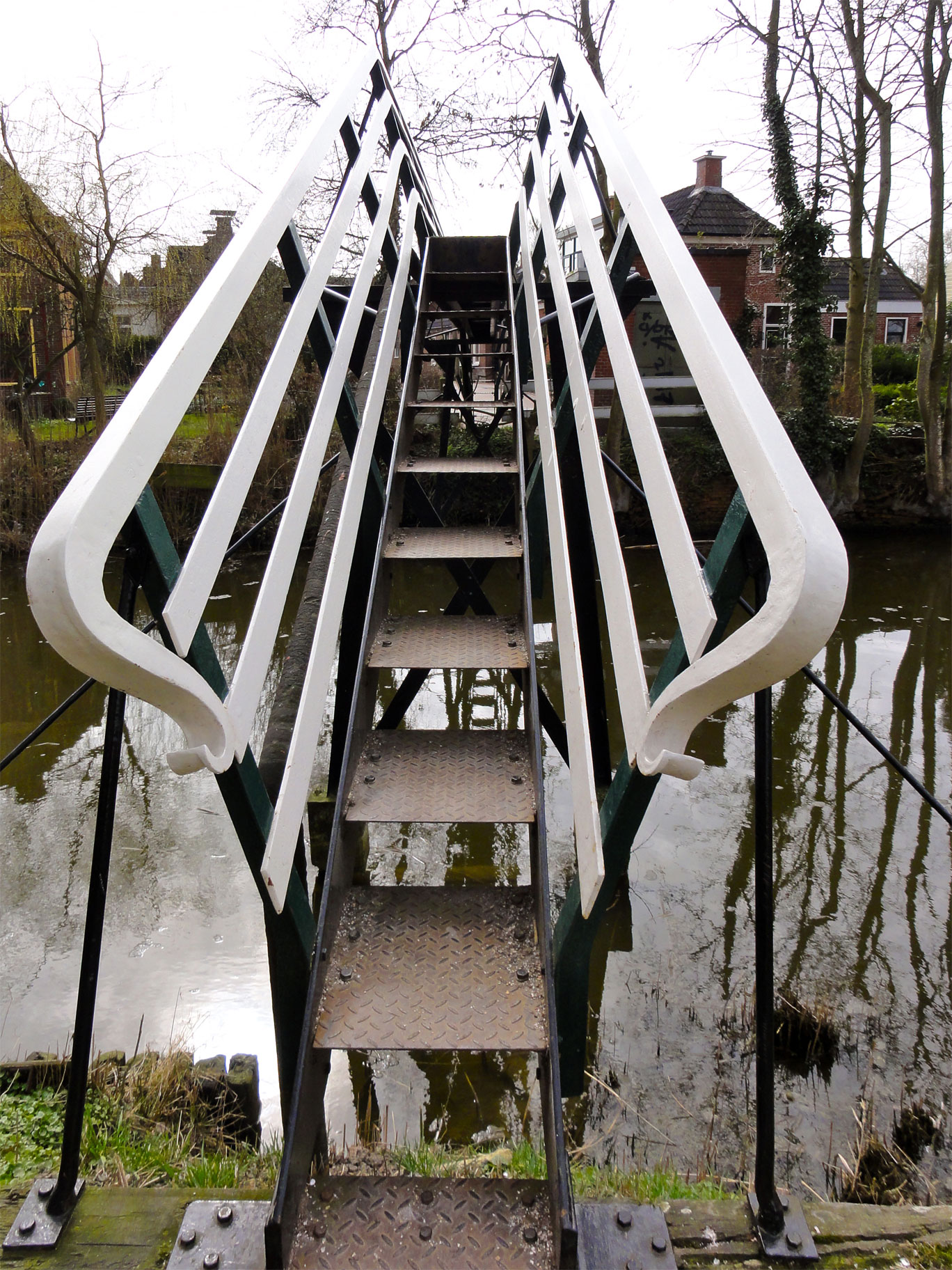
Steel bridge in Baflo

Area residents would be required to maintain the bridges. Between 1900 and 1910 this responsibility transferred to the municipalities in which they were located.

In rare cases special constructions are preserved as registered monument. Notable examples:

- steel bridge over the Baflo-Mensingeweer Canal in Baflo (Het Hogeland, Groningen)
- concrete bridge over the Frjentsjerter Feart in Wjelsryp (Waadhoeke, the eponymous hamlet of 't Heechhout, in Friesland).

== See also ==
- Gronings dialect
