= 1960 F-84 Thunderstreak crash =

Airplane crash on a farm

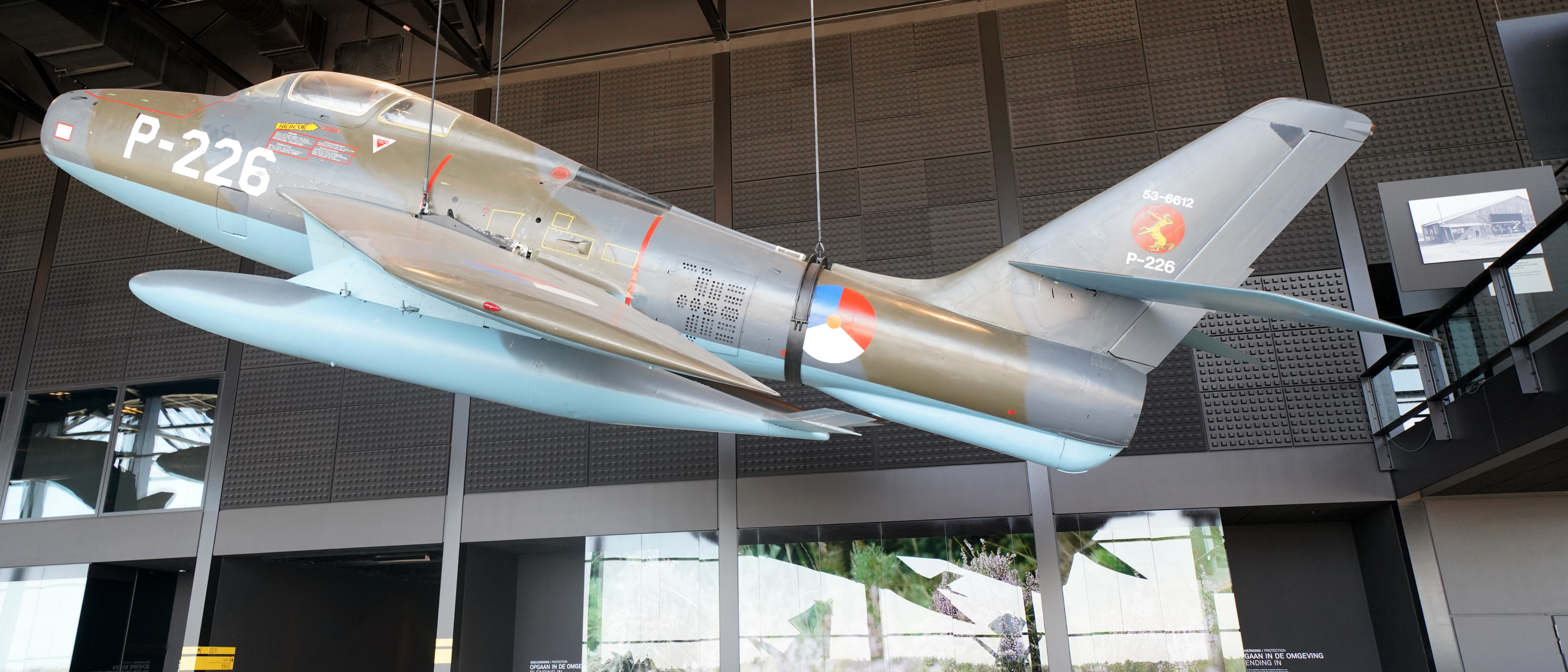
- An identical F-84F Thunderstreak of the Dutch Air Force, on display at the Nationaal Militair Museum in Soesterberg

Accident
- Date: 20 November 1960
- Summary: Crashed into terrain due to unknown reasons
- Site: Lutjelollum (between Wjelsryp and Franeker), the Netherlands
- Total fatalities: 7
- Total survivors: 0

Aircraft
- Aircraft type: F-84F Thunderstreak
- Operator: Royal Netherlands Air and Space Force
- Registration: P-271
- Flight origin: Eindhoven Airport
- Occupants: 1
- Crew: 1
- Fatalities: 1
- Survivors: 0

Ground casualties
- Ground fatalities: 6

On 20 November 1960, an F-84F Thunderstreak of the Royal Netherlands Air Force crashed at 7:50pm into a farm in Lutjelollum between Wjelsryp and Franeker, the Netherlands. The pilot and the family of six people who lived at the farm were all killed. The farm was destroyed and burned down and the livestock was killed.

It was the worst military airplane incident in the Netherlands since the 1957 Bussum North American F-100 Super Sabre crash. It was outside war time, the biggest aircraft tragedy of the province Friesland.

== Flight and crash ==
At 7:30pm the F-84F Thunderstreak departed from Eindhoven Airport. At 7:48 he was flying above Makkum at a height of around 1000 metres. He would have flown in the direction of Emmen and planned to elevate another 300 metres higher. At 8:50 the plane crashed into a farm in Lutjelollum between Wjelsryp and Franeker. The plane crashed into the ground on the site of the living area of the farm and created a crater of about 25 square meters.

== Aftermath ==
The crashes caused that lights went out temporary in the area. A big fire broke out on the farm. A milk car man was the sole eyewitness. He was a few tens of meters from the accident. He described that he saw a “giant pillar of fire” and was thrown from his milk car. The milk car man was able to release eight cows. But when the cows ran out of the cowshed, they ran into the fire. All eight suffered so many burns that the National Police later that evening had to kill them. The fire was extinguished by several fire departments, including the department of the Franker municipality and the Leeuwarden Air Base.

The airplane and the farm were totally damaged. A neighbor farm on a few tens of meters was also damaged from flying debris.

In front of the church in Welrijp a few meters wide monumental tombstone was placed in remembrance of the people who died.

In the 10 years after the crash, still some pieces of metal were found.

== Casualties ==
Seven people died in the crash. The pilot, the 25 years old lieutenant J.A.L.M. Snijders from Geleen. His body was found the day after the crash at the other side of a ditch, probably blown away by the air pressure. The family of 6 people of the farm where all at home and all died. The father Tjerk Postma (42), mother R. Postma-de Jong (41) and their four children: Tineke (11), Willem (10), Ali (8) and Gerrit (5). The father was livestock farmer and contractor owner. The father had received an invitation for a party of the Christelijke Boeren- en Tuindersbond that evening in Franker, but the mother didn't want to go due to the children.

The livestock consisting of 16 animals, including twelve cows, didn't survive. Only four animals in a cage next to the farm survived.

== Reactions ==
Quickly after the crash the party of the Christelijke Boeren- en Tuindersbond in Franeker was stopped.

In the morning after the crash, the defense minister Sim Visser and chief of the Royal Netherlands Air Force, lieutenant general Heije Schaper came by airplane from Ypenburg to visit the crash site.

The funeral was attended by many authorities and deputies of the Dutch Royal Air Force.

== Investigation ==
In the evening of the crash, a team from The Hague went by plane to the crash site to do preliminary investigation. The committee consisted of major Herckenrath and captain Collet. The next day an investigation team of the tactical air forces command went by plane to the crash site.

The pilot did not indicate in any way that something was wrong. There were no indications that the plane already exploded in the air.
