= Styggmann =

Mountain in Buskerud, Norway

- Styggemann
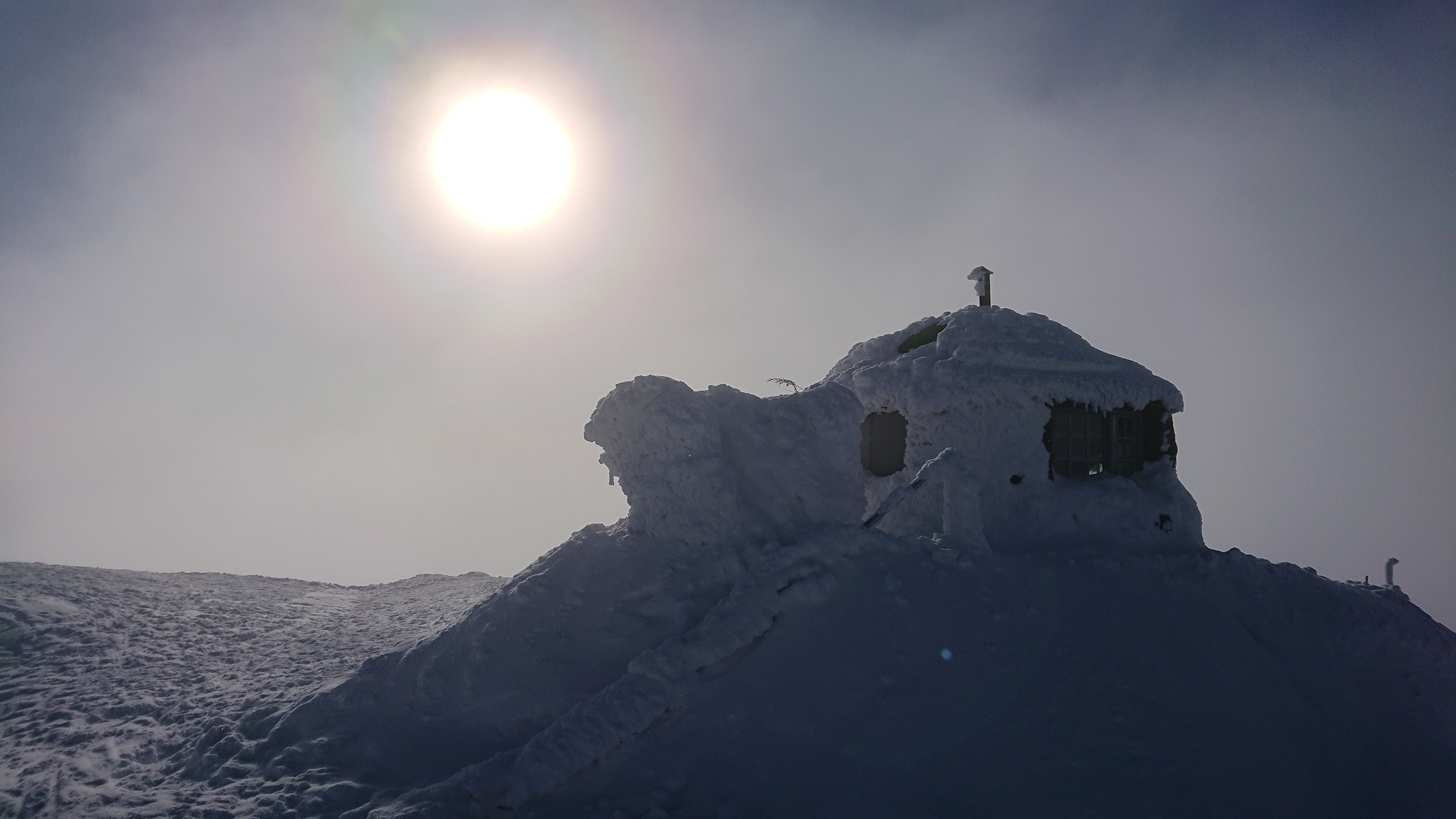
- Stone cabin on the mountain Styggmann near the town of Kongsberg, Norway.

Highest point
- Elevation: 872 m (2,861 ft)
- Prominence: 407 m (1,335 ft)
- Isolation: 18.1 km (11.2 mi)
- Coordinates: 59°31′15″N 9°38′36″E

Geography
- Location: Buskerud, Norway

Styggmann is a mountain in Kongsberg Municipality in Buskerud county, Norway. It is the highest mountain in the Skrimfjella mountain area. The 872-metre (2,861 ft) tall mountain is located about 16 kilometres (9.9 mi) south of the town of Kongsberg.

A legend about the mountain claims it used to be the home of a troll. The troll hated people walking on his mountain, disturbing his rest, so he used to lie on top of the mountain to scare them away. If someone came too close, he threw rocks and boulders at them. If you walk the path to Sørmyrseter, you can still see some of them. The troll was careful only to be outside when it was cloudy, but once he was surprised by the sun and turned to stone. You can still clearly see its nose, mouth, and chin if you look from the right angle, which is where the mountain has its name from (the name means "the ugly man").

On 1 August 1960, an F-84F Thunderflash crashed into the side of the mountain, killing the pilot.

== See also ==
- List of mountains of Norway by height
