= Skrimfjella =

Mountain in Norway

Highest point
- Elevation: 809 m (2,654 ft)
- Prominence: 39 m (128 ft)
- Isolation: 0.7 km (0.43 mi)
- Coordinates: 59°30′59″N 9°38′03″E

Geography
- Location: Buskerud, Norway

Skrimfjella is a mountain area in Kongsberg Municipality in Buskerud county, Norway. The area is located about 15 kilometres (9.3 mi) south of the town of Kongsberg. Notable peaks include Styggmann and Skrim. There are hundreds of holiday cottages in the area.

== See also ==
- List of mountains of Norway by height
