= Wjelsryp =

Welsrijp Wjelsryp
- Village
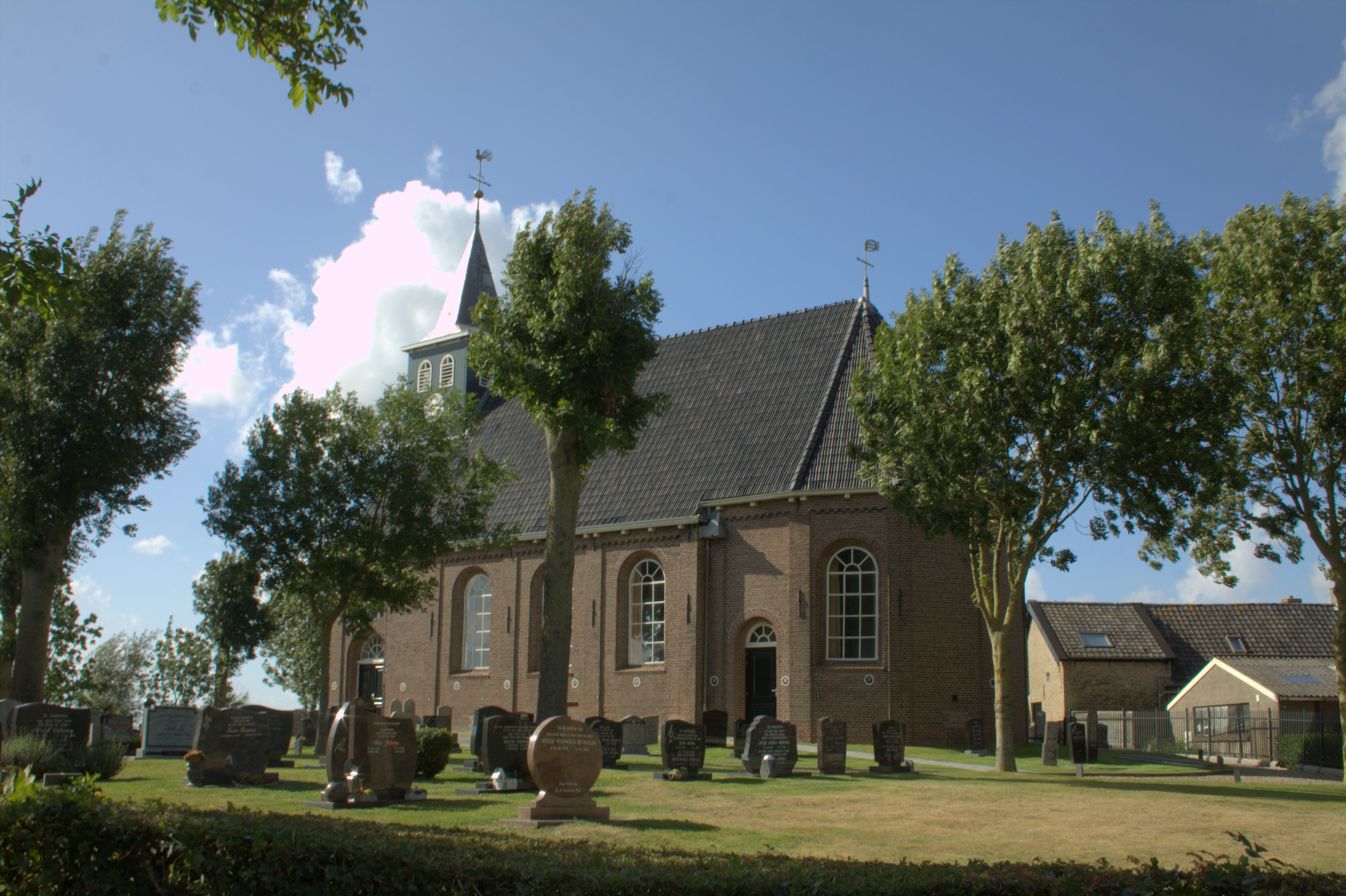
- Wjelsryp church

- Flag Coat of arms

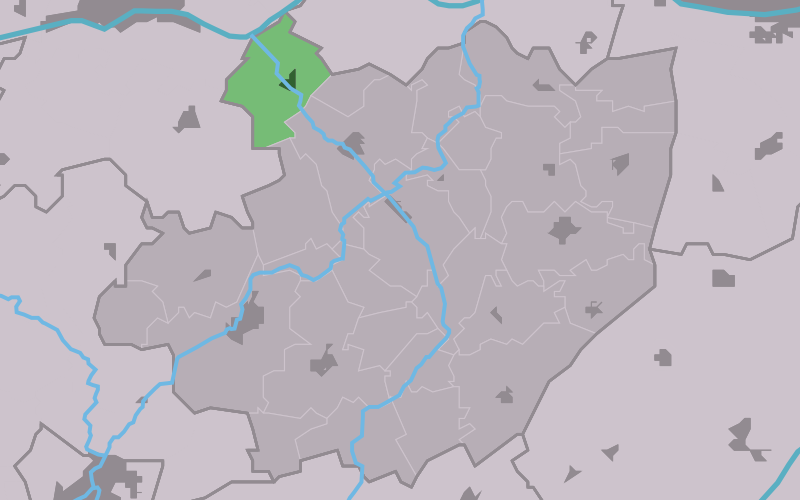
- Location in the former Littenseradiel municipality

- Location in the Netherlands Welsrijp (Netherlands)
- Country: Netherlands
- Province: Friesland
- Municipality: Waadhoeke

Area
  - Total: 5.95 km^{2} (2.30 sq mi)
- Elevation: −0.1 m (−0.33 ft)

Population (2021)
  - Total: 455
  - Density: 76.5/km^{2} (198/sq mi)
- Time zone: UTC+1 (CET)
  - Summer (DST): UTC+2 (CEST)
- Postal code: 8842
- Dialing code: 0517

Wjelsryp (Dutch: Welsrijp) is a village in Waadhoeke municipality in the province of Friesland, the Netherlands. It had a population of around 463 in January 2017.

== History ==
The village was first mentioned in 944 as Welsib, and means "bank of Wille or Wilse (person)". Wjelsryp was originally a fishing village. The changing Wadden Sea forced the villagers to relocate to a terp (artificial living hill).

The Dutch Reformed church was originally built around 1200. In 1515, the church was burnt down by the Arumer Zwarte Hoop. Its replacement collapsed in 1836. The current church was modified in 1892.

Wjelsryp was home to 348 people in 1840. In the late-19th century, the economy switched from a fishing community to an agricultural community.

Before 2018, the village was part of the Littenseradiel municipality and before 1984 it belonged to Hennaarderadeel municipality.

== Airplane crash ==
On 20 November 1960 a F-84F Thunderstreak of the Royal Netherlands Air Force crashed at 7:50pm into a farm in Lutjelollum near Wjelsryp. The pilot and the family of six people who lived at the farm were all killed. The farm was destroyed and burned down and the livestock was killed.

== Gallery ==
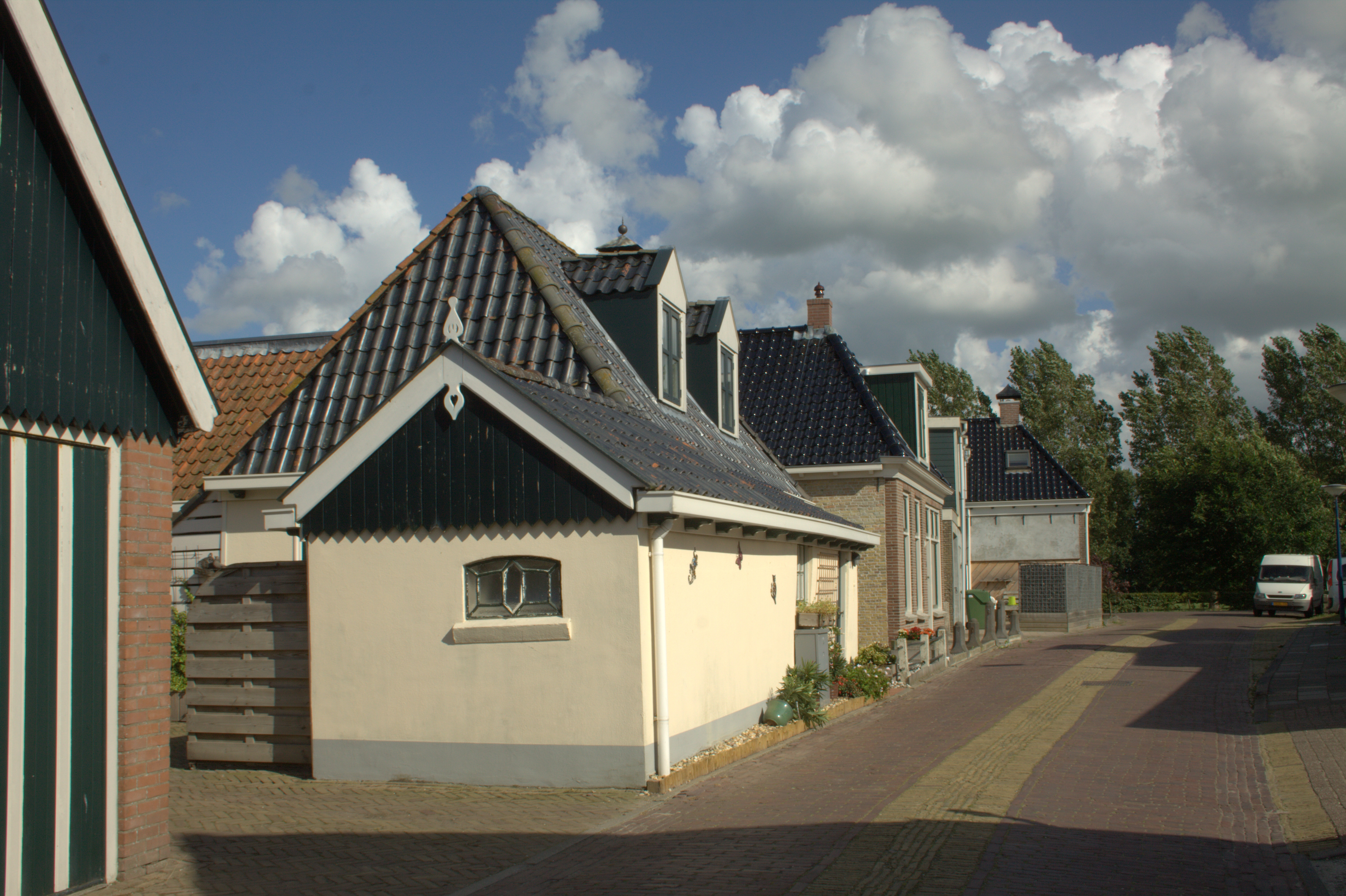
Village view

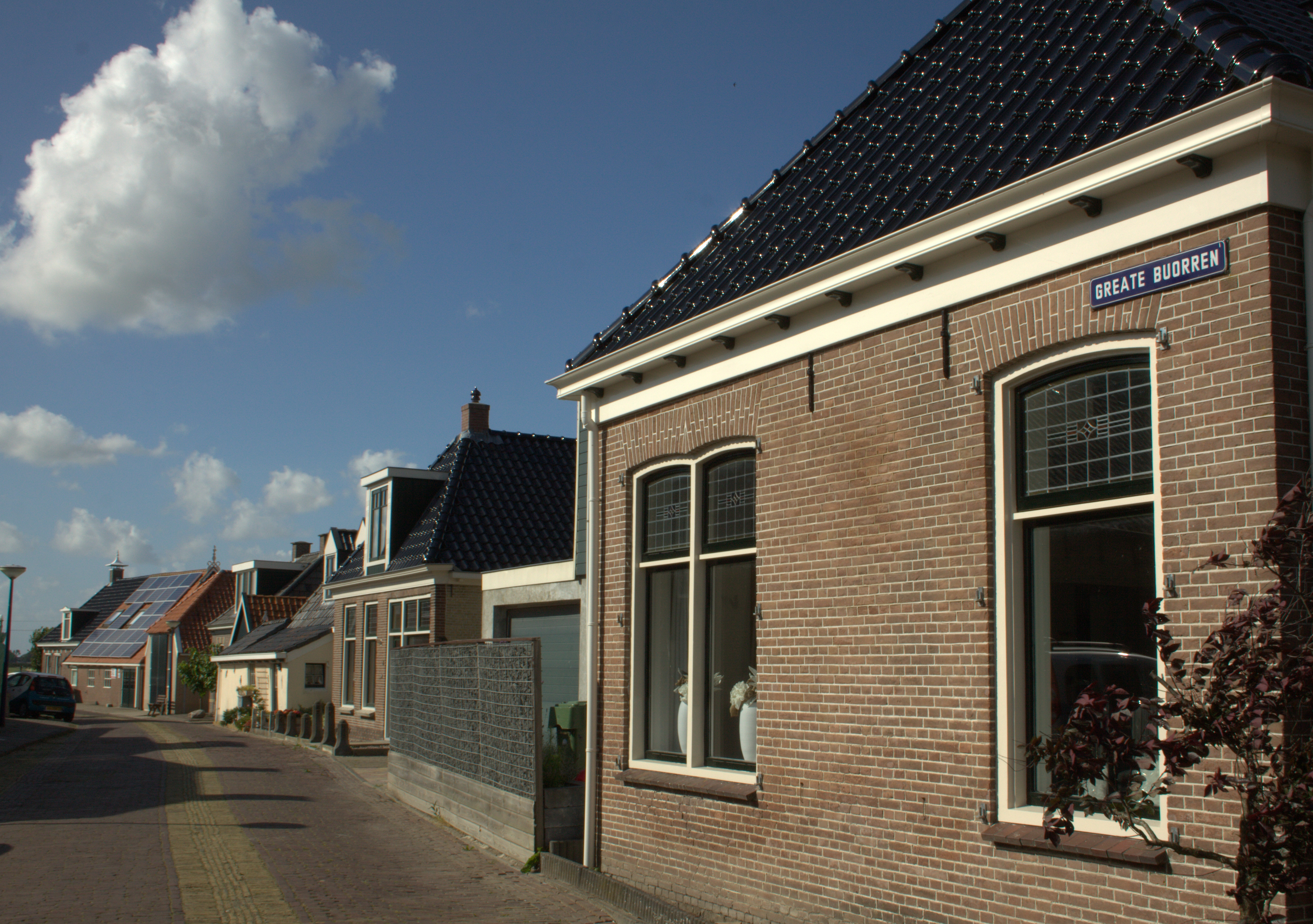
Street view

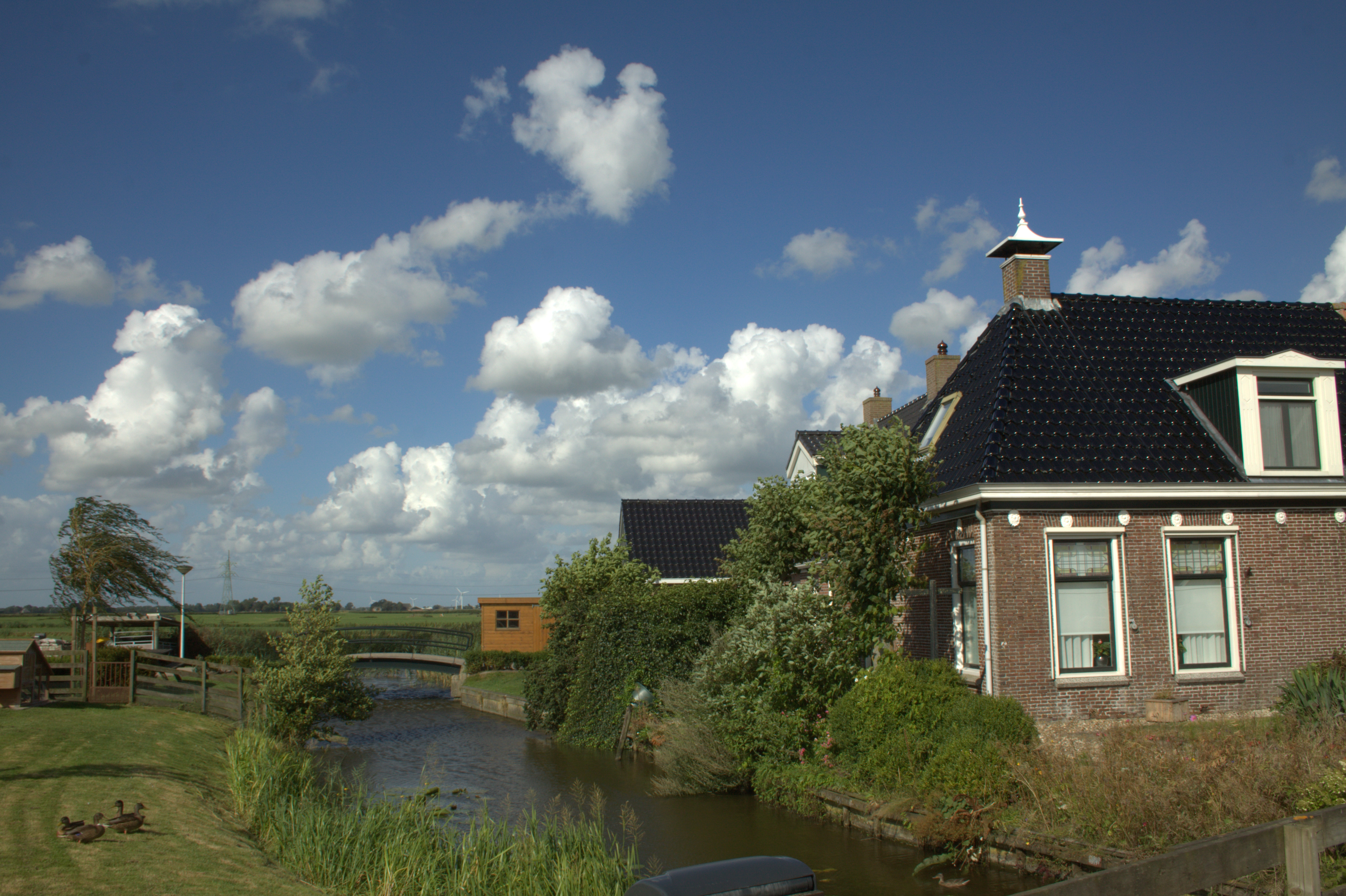
Farm in Wjelsryp

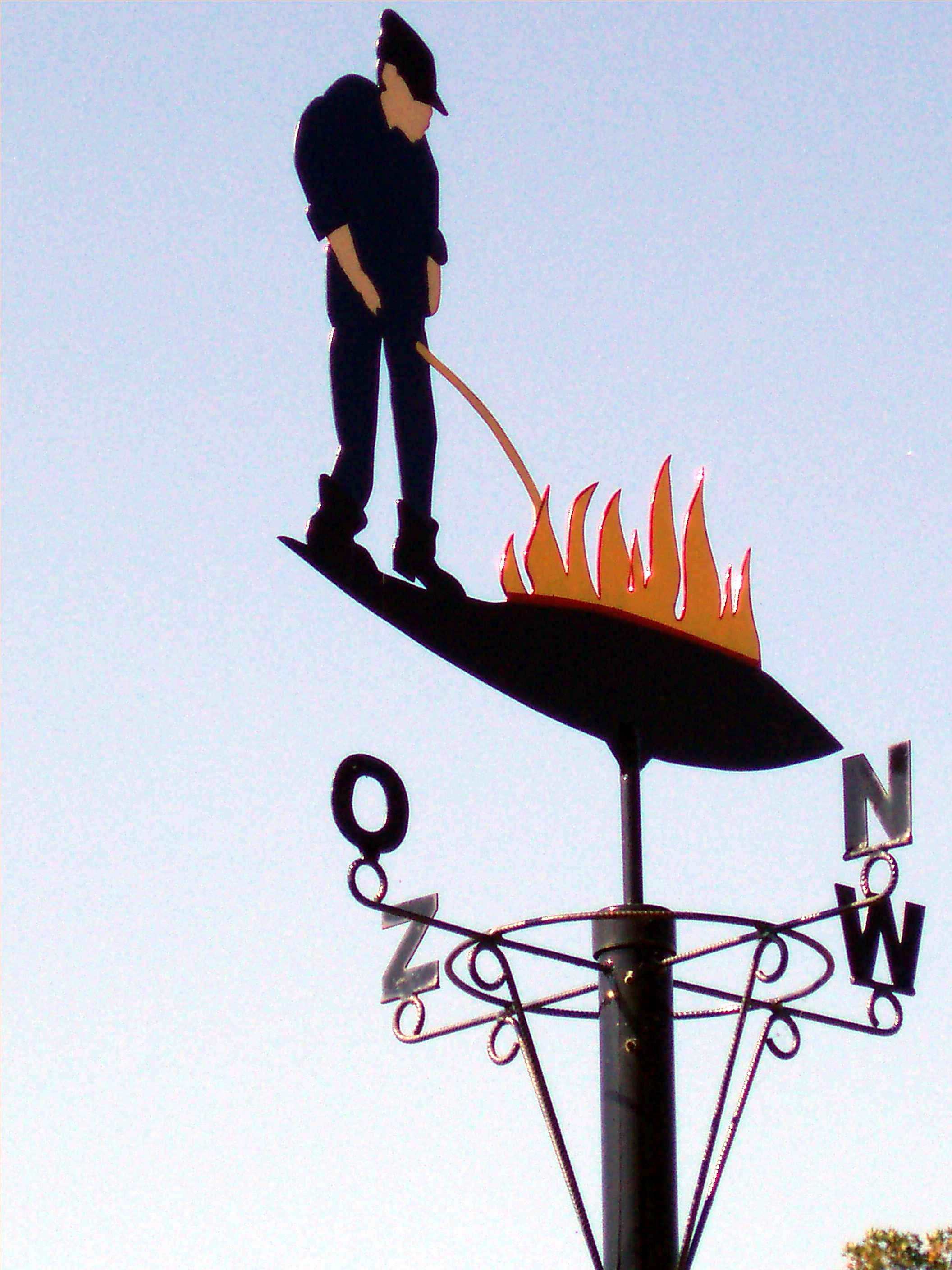
Fireman weather vane
