= Republic XF-84H Thunderscreech =

Experimental turboprop aircraft

XF-84H "Thunderscreech"
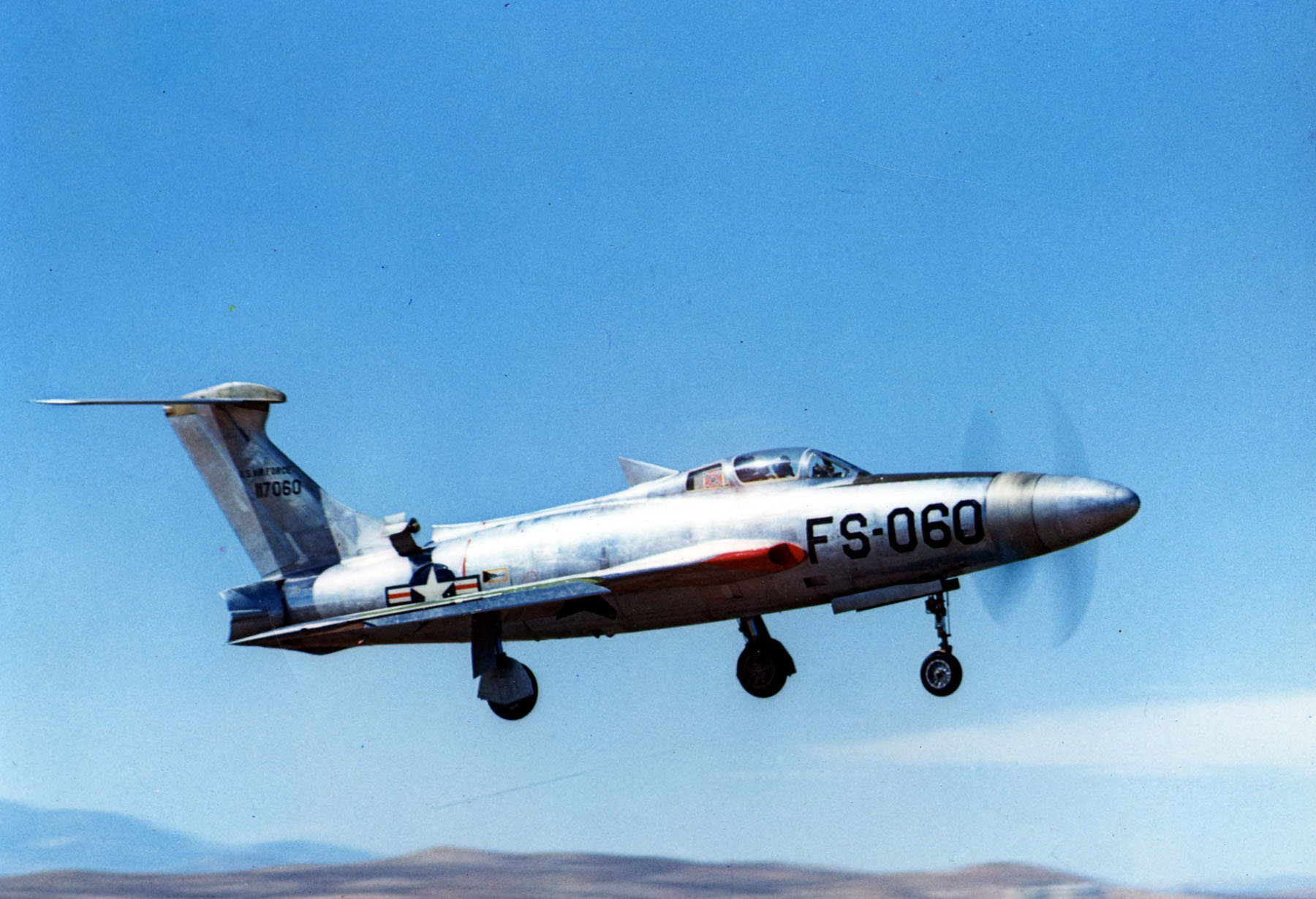
- XF-84H serial number 51-17060 in flight, with the ram air turbine extended

General information
- Type: Experimental fighter
- National origin: United States
- Manufacturer: Republic Aviation
- Primary user: United States Air Force
- Number built: 2

History
- First flight: 22 July 1955
- Last flight: 9 October 1956
- Developed from: Republic F-84F Thunderstreak
- Fate: One preserved

The Republic XF-84H "Thunderscreech" is an American experimental turboprop aircraft derived from the F-84F Thunderstreak. Powered by a turbine engine that was mated to a supersonic propeller, the XF-84H had the potential of setting the unofficial air speed record for propeller-driven aircraft, but was unable to overcome aerodynamic deficiencies and engine reliability problems, resulting in the program's cancellation. Its name, Thunderscreech, is a reference to its extremely loud supersonic propeller.

== Design and development ==
Although the USAF Wright Air Development Center was the key sponsor of the Republic Project 3347 turboprop fighter, the initial inception came from a U.S. Navy requirement for a carrier fighter not requiring catapult assistance. Originally known as XF-106 (a designation later reused for the Convair F-106), the project and its resultant prototype aircraft were redesignated XF-84H, closely identifying the program as an F-84 variant, rather than an entirely new type. With a projected contract for three prototypes, when the US Navy canceled its order, ultimately, the remaining XF-84H prototypes became pure research aircraft built for the Air Force's Propeller Laboratory at Wright-Patterson AFB to test supersonic propellers in exploring the combination of propeller responsiveness at jet speeds.

The XF-84H was created by modifying a F-84F Thunderstreak airframe, installing a 5,850 hp (4,360 kW) XT40-A-1 turboprop engine in a centrally located housing behind the cockpit, driving an 18 ft (5.5 m) extension shaft to the nose-mounted propeller. The turbine engine also provided thrust through its exhaust; an afterburner was installed, but it was only lit on a test stand and was never used in flight. Thrust was adjusted by changing the blade pitch of the 12 ft (3.7 m) diameter Aeroproducts propeller, consisting of three steel, square-tipped blades turning at a constant speed, with the tips traveling at approximately Mach 1.18 (1,446 km/h). To counter the propeller's torque and "P-factor", the XF-84H was fitted with a fixed dorsal yaw vane. The tail was changed to a T-tail to avoid turbulent airflow over the horizontal stabilizer/elevator surfaces from propeller wash.

The XF-84H was destabilized by the powerful torque from the propeller, as well as inherent problems with supersonic propeller blades. A number of exotic blade configurations were tested before settling on a final design. Various design features were intended to counteract the massive torque, including mounting the left leading edge intake 12 in (30 cm) further forward than the right, and providing left and right flaps with differential operation. The two prototypes were equally plagued with engine-related problems affecting other aircraft fitted with T40 engines, such as the Douglas A2D Skyshark and North American XA2J Super Savage attack aircraft. A notable feature of the design was that the XF-84H was the first aircraft to carry a retractable/extendable ram air turbine. In the event of engine failure, it would automatically swing out into the airstream to provide hydraulic and electrical power. Due to frequent engine problems, as a precaution, the unit was often deployed in flight.

== Testing ==
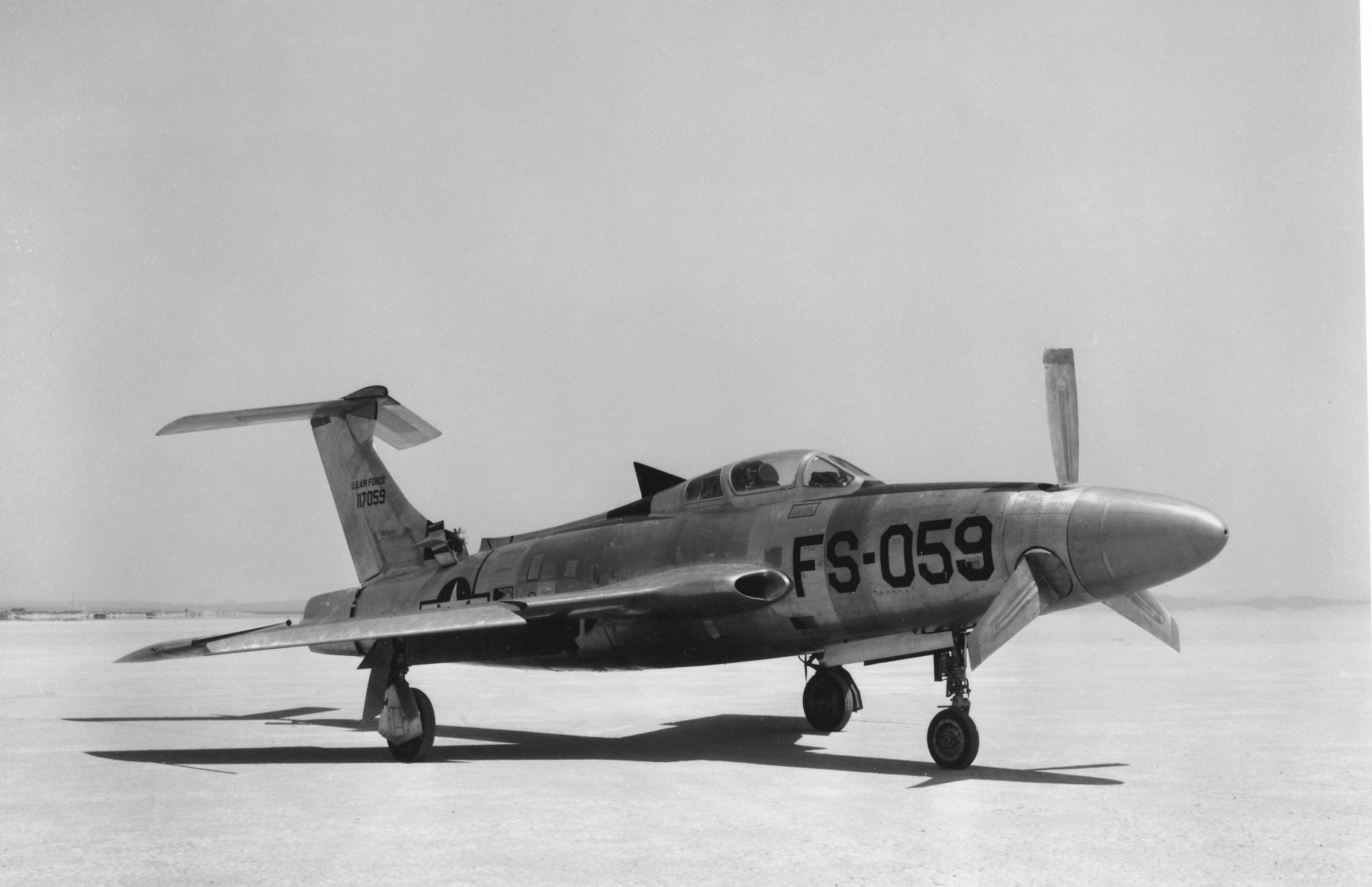
Prototype 51-17059

After manufacture at Republic's plant in Farmingdale, Long Island, the two XF-84Hs were disassembled and shipped via rail to Edwards Air Force Base for flight testing. First flown on July 22, 1955, the XF-84H had incredible acceleration but soon its impracticality was discovered. It was unsuited to combat due to the engine's 30-minute warm-up time, but the most serious concerns were vibration generated from the 12-foot diameter propeller and mechanical failures of the prop pitch gearing. The prototypes flew a total of 12 test flights from Edwards, accumulating only 6 hours and 40 minutes of flight time. Lin Hendrix, one of the Republic test pilots assigned to the program, flew the aircraft once and refused to ever fly it again, claiming "it never flew over 450 knots (830 km/h) indicated, since at that speed, it developed an unhappy practice of 'snaking', apparently losing longitudinal stability". Hendrix also told the formidable Republic project engineer, "You aren't big enough and there aren't enough of you to get me in that thing again". The other test flights were fraught with engine failures, and persistent hydraulic, nose gear, and vibration problems. Test pilot Hank Beaird took the XF-84H up 11 times, with 10 of these flights ending in forced landings.

=== Noise ===
The XF-84H was almost certainly the loudest aircraft ever built, earning the nickname "Thunderscreech" as well as the "Mighty Ear Banger". On the ground "run ups", the prototypes could reportedly be heard 25 miles (40 km) away. Unlike standard propellers that turn at subsonic speeds, the outer 24–30 inches (61–76 cm) of the blades on the XF-84H's propeller traveled faster than the speed of sound even at idle thrust, producing a continuous visible sonic boom that radiated laterally from the propellers for hundreds of yards. The shock wave was actually powerful enough to knock a man down; an unfortunate crew chief who was inside a nearby C-47 was severely incapacitated during a 30-minute ground run. Coupled with the already considerable noise from the subsonic aspect of the propeller and the T40's dual turbine sections, the aircraft was notorious for inducing severe nausea and headaches among ground crews. In one report, a Republic engineer suffered a seizure after close range exposure to the shock waves emanating from a powered-up XF-84H.

The pervasive noise also severely disrupted operations in the Edwards AFB control tower by risking vibration damage to sensitive components and forcing air traffic personnel to communicate with the XF-84H's crew on the flight line by light signals. After numerous complaints, the Air Force Flight Test Center directed Republic to tow the aircraft out on Rogers Dry Lake, far from the flight line, before running up its engine. The test program did not proceed further than the manufacturer's Phase I proving flights; consequently, no USAF test pilots flew the XF-84H. With the likelihood that the engine and equipment failures coupled with the inability to reach design speeds and subsequent instability experienced were insurmountable problems, the USAF canceled the program in September 1956.

=== Historical significance ===
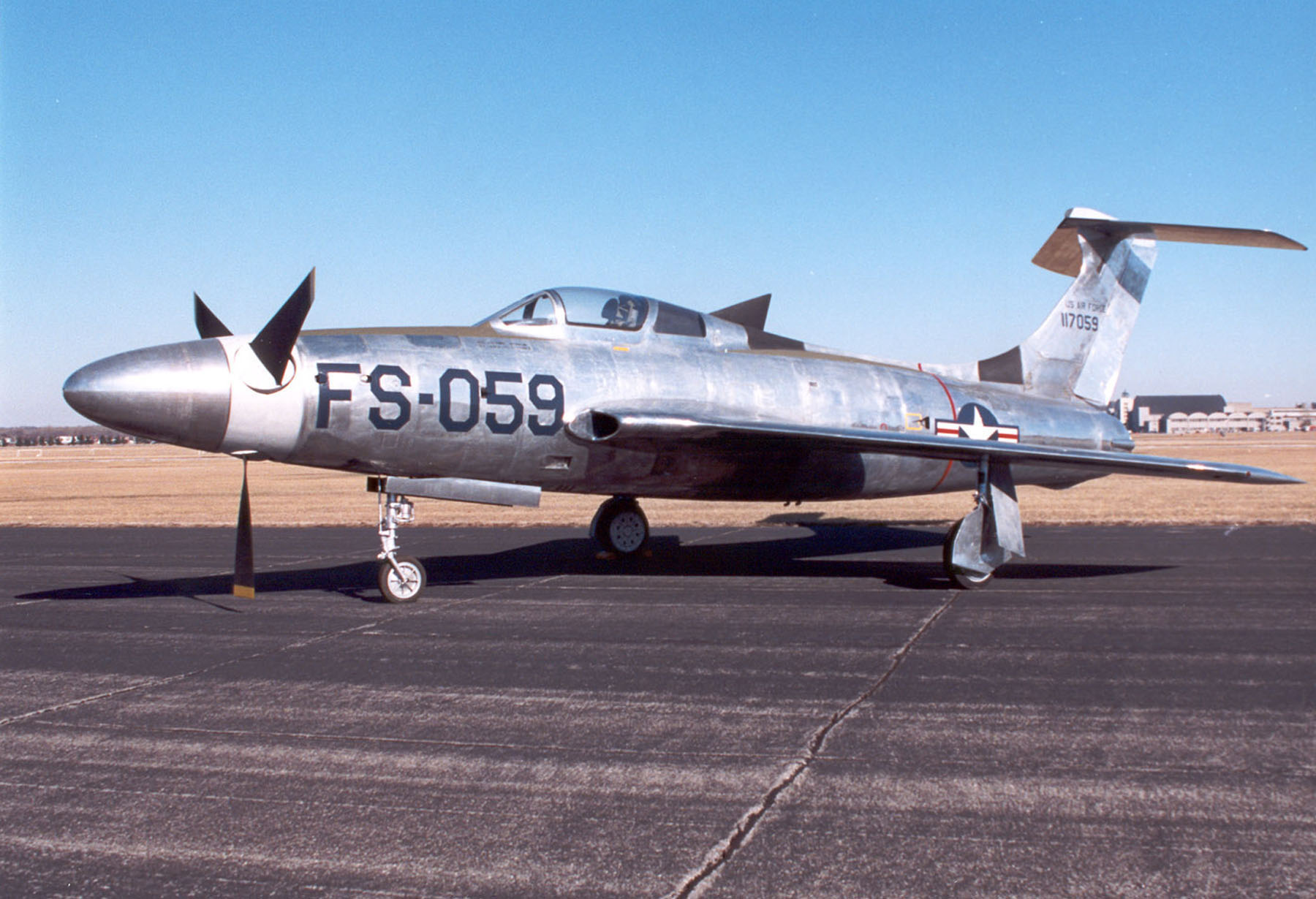
Prototype 51-17059

Although The Guinness Book of World Records recorded the XF-84H as the fastest propeller-driven aircraft ever built, with a design top speed of 670 mph (1,080 km/h) (Mach 0.9) and 623 mph (1,003 km/h) (Mach 0.83) during tests, this claim has been disputed.

The unofficial record speed is also inconsistent with data from the National Museum of the United States Air Force, which gives a top speed of 520 mph (840 km/h) (Mach 0.70), nonetheless, making the XF-84H the fastest single-engine propeller-driven aircraft until 1989 when "Rare Bear", a highly modified Grumman F8F Bearcat, reached 528 mph (850 km/h) (Mach 0.71).

== Operators ==
United States

- United States Air Force: The prototypes never flew in USAF pilots' hands, as they only completed the initial manufacturer's flight tests.

== Aircraft disposition ==
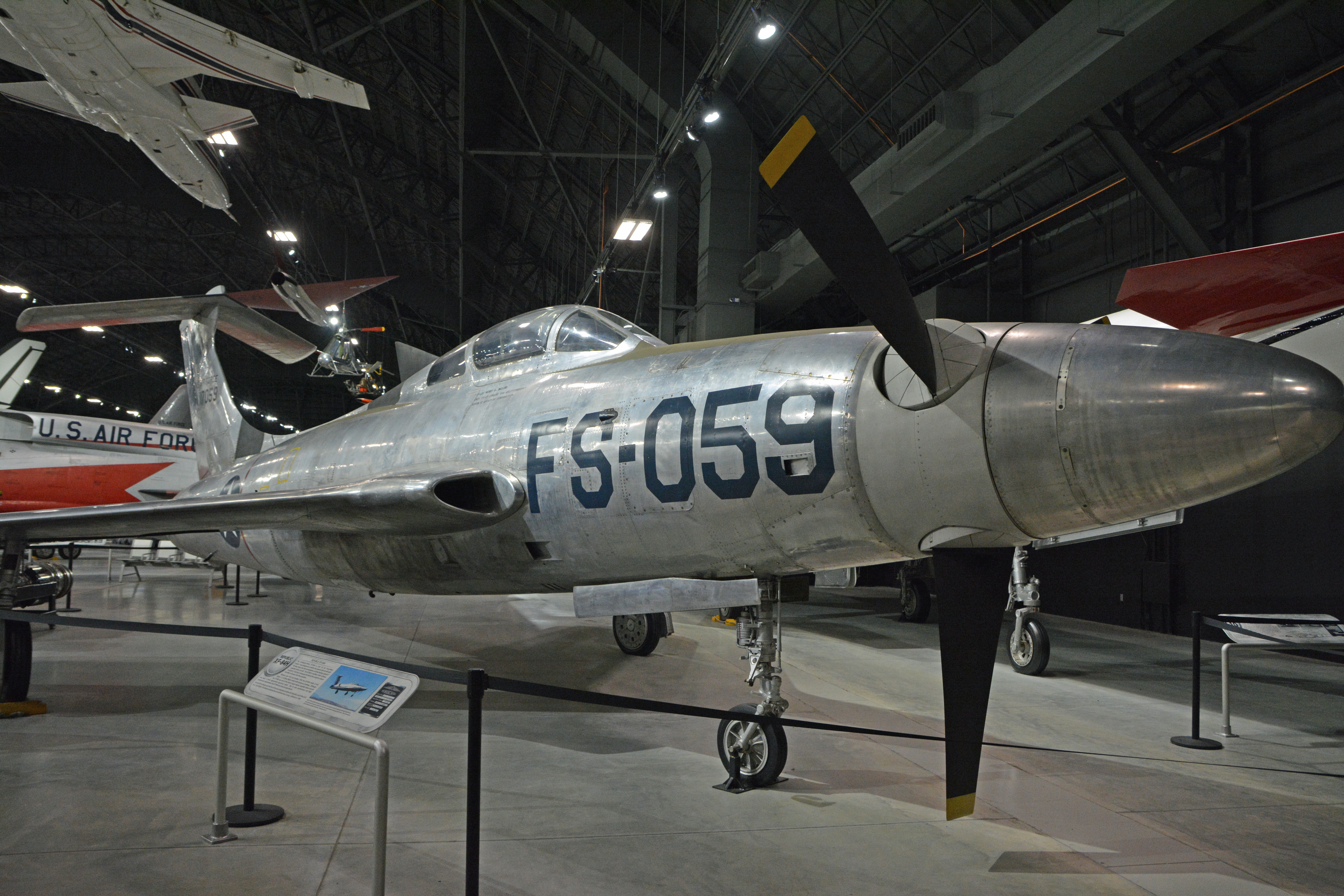
Republic XF-84H at the U.S. Air Force museum, 2018

Two prototypes were built (51-17059 and 51-17060), with buzz numbers FS-059 and FS-060.

- 51-17059 (FS-059) – on display at the National Museum of the United States Air Force at Wright-Patterson Air Force Base, near Dayton, Ohio. It was retired and spent many years mounted on a pole outside Meadows Field Airport, Bakersfield, California, where its propeller turned by the use of an electric motor. In 1992, the gate guardian was taken to the 178th Fighter Wing of the Ohio Air National Guard, whose volunteers spent over 3,000 hours returning the Thunderscreech to display condition.
- 51-17060 (FS-060) – made only four flights, and is assumed to have been scrapped when the project was canceled in 1956. Its T40 engine was reportedly used to support the Douglas A2D Skyshark flight test program.

== Specifications ==
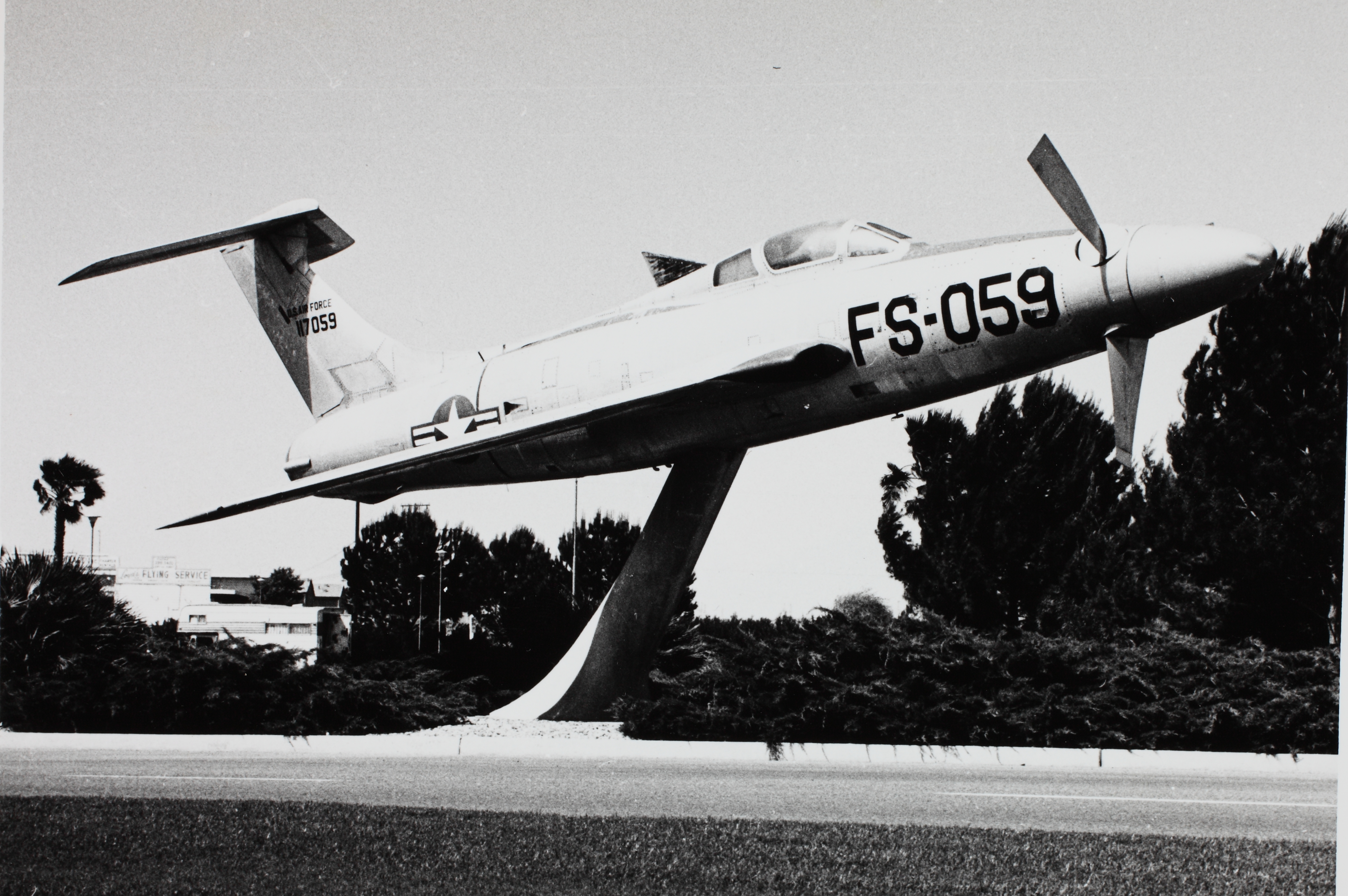
The first XF-84H on display in Bakersfield

General characteristics

- Crew: 1
- Length: 51 ft 5 in (15.67 m)
- Wingspan: 33 ft 5 in (10.18 m)
- Height: 15 ft 4 in (4.67 m)
- Wing area: 331.0 sq ft (30.75 m^{2})
- Empty weight: 17,892 lb (8,116 kg)
- Gross weight: 27,046 lb (12,268 kg)
- Powerplant: 1 × Allison XT40-A-1 turboprop, 5,850 hp (4,360 kW)

Performance

- Maximum speed: 520 mph (840 km/h, 450 kn)
- Range: 2,000 mi (3,200 km, 1,700 nmi)
- Service ceiling: 40,000 ft (12,000 m)
- Rate of climb: 5,000 ft/min (25 m/s)
- Thrust/weight: 0.66

== See also ==
- Aircraft noise

Related development

- Republic F-84 Thunderjet
- Republic F-84F Thunderstreak
- Republic XF-91 Thunderceptor

Aircraft of comparable role, configuration, and era

- Consolidated Vultee XP-81
- Douglas A2D Skyshark
- McDonnell XF-88B
- Ryan XF2R Dark Shark

Related lists

- List of military aircraft of the United States
