= Beechcraft XT-36 =

Canceled 1950s American dual-role trainer-transport aircraft

XT-36

General information
- Type: Trainer-transport
- National origin: United States
- Manufacturer: Beechcraft
- Status: Canceled
- Number built: 1 (prototype, not flown; second prototype abandoned prior to completion)

History
- Introduction date: 1951

The Beechcraft XT-36 (company designation Model 46, intended production designation T-36A) was an American twin-engine trainer-transport aircraft project of the early 1950s by the Beech Aircraft Company. The project was initiated by the United States Air Force on an expedited basis to address expected wartime aircrew training needs, but changing requirements led to delays, design difficulties, and spiraling development costs. The aircraft was ultimately deemed unnecessary and canceled before the prototypes flew.

== Design and development ==
The project was started in 1951 with the rising demand for new aircrew due to the Korean War. The XT-36 was intended for use in both trainer and transport roles, but the United States Air Force (USAF) initiated the project primarily to address an anticipated shortage of North American TB-25 trainers. The USAF wanted to eventually use turboprop power but no suitable engine could be identified when the requests for proposals were issued; the director of the USAF Air Materiel Command recommended delaying the project, believing that the lack of engine specifications would cause design difficulties and limit the performance of the aircraft, but the new trainer was felt to be of sufficiently high priority that the recommendation was overruled. A proposal from Canadair was initially selected, but USAF leaders hesitated to award a major sole-source contract to a foreign company, and as a compromise, American manufacturer Beech Aircraft Company was selected as the prime supplier with 195 orders, while contracts for an additional 227 aircraft were awarded to Canadair.

The aircraft emerged as a low-wing monoplane with twin Pratt & Whitney R-2800 radial engines providing power; the design specified a pressurized cabin, capable of carrying either an instructor and three students in the training role, or two crewmembers and up to twelve passengers in a transport configuration. Top speed was expected to be around 350 miles per hour (560 km/h) at over 30,000 feet (9,100 m). Beech built a new assembly plant for the production line and Canadair likewise prepared to produce the aircraft as the CL-15.

The project was dealt a significant setback when the USAF issued specifications in February 1952 for the turboprop powerplant, selecting the 3,750 horsepower (2,800 kW) Allison T38, which had about 50% more power than the R-2800. The USAF wanted to retrofit initial-production aircraft with the T38, which would not occur until the engine became available in late 1955 at the earliest, and possibly as late as 1960. Performance-limiting design compromises were necessary to accommodate engines of such disparate output in one airframe, necessitating a significant increase in the gross weight of the aircraft. This caused significant design delays that were compounded when the USAF issued a further request in June 1952 to investigate using turbojet power in a future version. Additionally, the aggressive delivery schedule had prompted Beech to subcontract various components to manufacturers with little aviation experience, and the myriad design changes caused further delays and ballooning costs as Beech struggled to coordinate the program. However, the USAF had issued an incentive-type contract with the final price to be negotiated after the 20th production aircraft was delivered, giving Beech little incentive to contain the spiraling development costs as the requirements changed.

In June 1953, the USAF scaled back its training goals, and decided that the T-36A did not offer sufficient advantages over the TB-25 to warrant purchasing replacement aircraft; the T-36A was also deemed overweight and inefficient, as its cadet, cargo, and passenger capacity was limited. The program was canceled shortly before the first flight of the prototype was to occur. One prototype assigned Beech serial number J-1 was built but never flown. Excluding contractor-provided equipment such as engines and accessories, more than US$77 million (equivalent to $905 million in 2024) was spent on the program. The two prototypes were abandoned.

== Variants ==
XT-36A
Military designation for Beech Model 46 trainer for the USAF; prototype completed but not flown.
CL-15
Licensed production by Canadair. None built.

== Specifications (estimated) ==
Data from The Beechcraft T-36

General characteristics

- Crew: two to four
- Capacity: 12 passengers
- Wingspan: 70 ft (21 m)
- Gross weight: 25,000 lb (11,340 kg)
- Powerplant: 2 × Pratt & Whitney R-2800 radial piston engines, 2,300 hp (1,700 kW) each

Performance

- Maximum speed: 350 mph (560 km/h, 300 kn)
- Cruise speed: 300 mph (480 km/h, 260 kn)
- Range: 650 mi (1,050 km, 560 nmi)
- Service ceiling: 34,000 ft (10,000 m)

== See also ==
Aircraft of comparable role, configuration, and era

- T-7 Navigator
- T-29 Flying Classroom

Related lists

- List of military aircraft of the United States
