= Allison T40 =

Turboprop aircraft engine family

T40
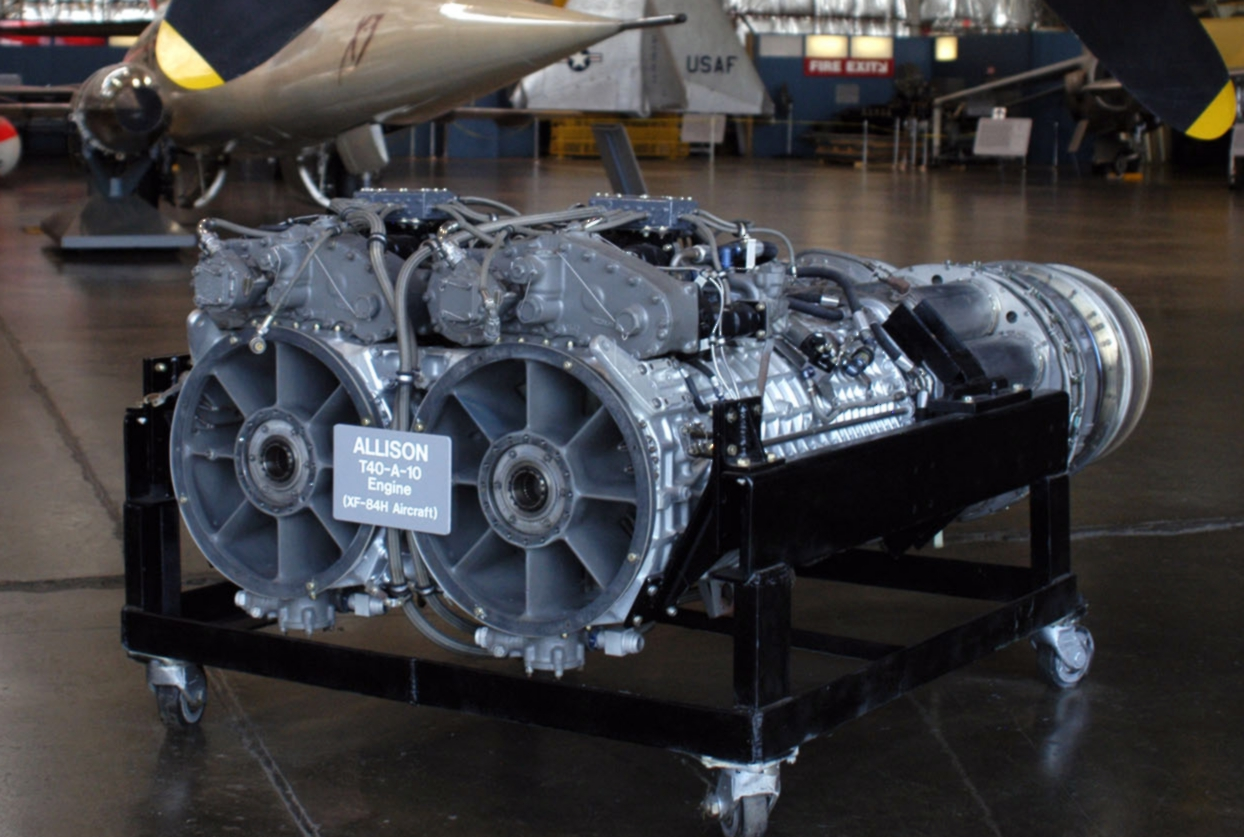
- T40-A-10 at the National Museum of the United States Air Force
- Type: Turboprop
- National origin: United States
- Manufacturer: Allison Engine Company
- Major applications: A2D Skyshark; Convair R3Y Tradewind; Convair XFY Pogo
- Developed from: Allison T38

The Allison T40, company designation Allison Model 500, was an early American turboprop engine composed of two Allison T38 power sections driving contra-rotating propellers via a common gearbox.

== Design and development ==
The T40 concept originated at Allison in 1944, where design studies were carried out on a 4,000 shp (2,983 kW) turboprop engine. Taking advantage of this effort, the US Navy awarded Allison a contract for the design and development of a 4,100 shp (3,057 kW) turboprop engine. The resulting T40 combined two Allison T38-A-1 power sections side-by-side with a common reduction gearbox powering contra-rotating propellers. Similar in layout to the Armstrong Siddeley Double Mamba, the T40 differed in that each engine drove both the forward and the rear propellers, unlike the Double Mamba, where each Mamba power section drove either the front or the rear propeller separately.

The T38-A-1 power sections each contained 17-stage compressors giving a pressure ratio of 6.3:1, eight combustion chambers, and four-stage turbines. A combining reduction gearbox was driven via extension shafts from the power sections. Each transmission shaft incorporated a clutch to allow the power sections to be run independently.

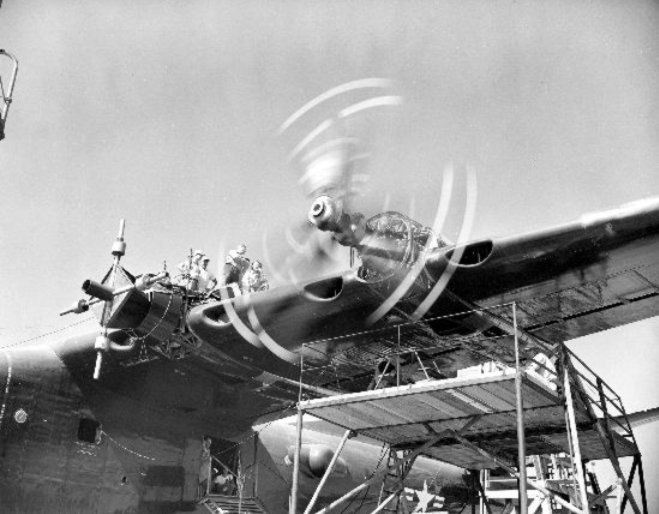
T40 engines on the XP5Y-1 prototype in 1950

Accessories included a Master Control Unit, mounted above the compressors, and an air driven starter on the gearbox. The compound reduction gear had an overall reduction ratio of 15.75:1 and incorporated an airscrew brake to prevent windmilling when the engine was stopped. Anti-icing for the air intakes was supplied by compressor bleed air. The contra-rotating propeller consisted of two 14 ft (4.3 m) three-bladed Aeroproducts propellers fitted to concentric shafts.

Testing of the XT40 began on 4 June 1948. There was a vibration problem in the reduction gearbox due to the coincidence of tooth-meshing frequencies which required a redesign. The de-coupling system, designed to disconnect a power section in the event of failure worked successfully. During a run in a test cell one power section developed a major oil leak and an attempt to shut it down failed because the engine carried on running on the leaking oil. After many attempts to shut it down the offending power section could only be shut down by destroying the compressor with debris thrown down the intake, proving the de-coupling system.

First flight test of the T40 was in the Convair XP5Y flying boat on 18 April 1950 fitted with four T40-A-4 developing 5,250 shp (3,915 kW). Service use of the T40 revealed problems with integrity of the propellers and gearboxes with at least one instance each of a propeller breaking free and a gearbox separation. One unusual problem was discovered during ground running of the Republic XF-84H Thunderscreech turboprop powered fighter; the special transonic 3-bladed single propeller set up harmonics that proved to be harmful to humans within a certain distance from the aircraft.

The major problems of the T40 included gearbox failures, and the propeller control system (all the engine accessories were powered by a vacuum system which used 25 hoses), and the engine was far from reliable. As the individual power plants were clutched into the gearbox, it was intended in most instances that the aircraft could cruise on one half of the engine and only engage the second power-section when there was need. In practice the system did not work well. Failure to recognize that one of the T38s had failed, and its compressor was devouring power produced by the other section, led to the loss of the first prototype Douglas XA2D-1 and its pilot on 14 December 1950.

== Operational history ==
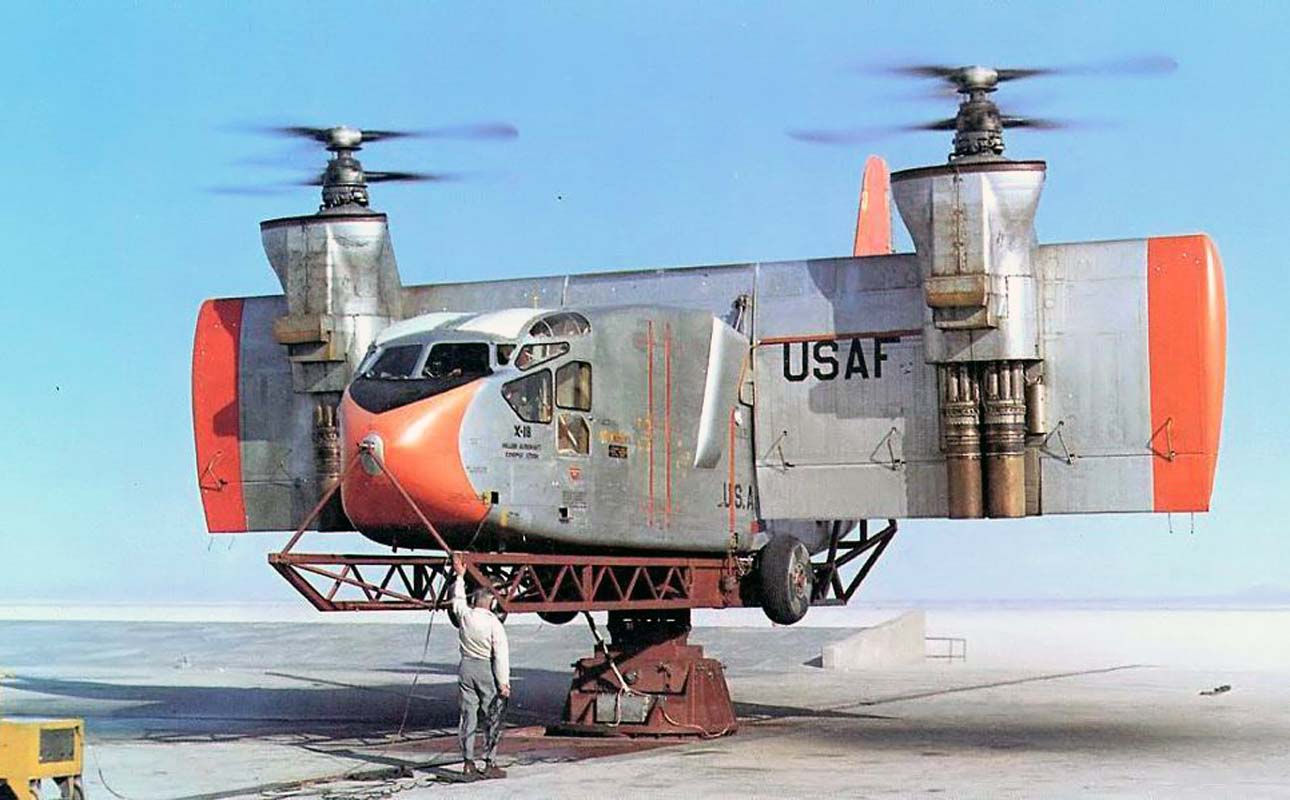
The engine cowlings on this Hiller X-18 have not been fully installed, so the dual turbine units are visible.

The first aircraft to fly with the T40 was the Convair XP5Y-1 patrol aircraft prototype. As flying boat patrol aircraft became redundant, the US Navy changed the role of the aircraft from Anti-Submarine Warfare to Transport. Modifications to the XP5Y-1 (such as provision of air conditioning and pressurisation) produced the Convair R3Y Tradewind, which was to become the only aircraft using the T40 to actually enter service. These large four-engined flying boats served primarily between NAS Alameda and Hawaii during the mid-1950s (replacing the Martin Mars flying boats). There were numerous problems with the T40s. One resulted in near disaster in 1956, when an R3Y managed to land with a runaway engine, resulting in a collision with a seawall. This event gave the US Navy one more reason to ground the R3Y, which it did soon after.

The only other aircraft to be produced in any quantity to be powered by the T40 was the Douglas A2D Skyshark. Of the sixteen examples built, the twelve used for evaluation suffered similar problems with the propellers and gearboxes.

The T40 was also fitted to the North American A2J-1 Super Savage but the poor performance of the aircraft and continuing difficulties with the engines forced cancellation in favour of the Douglas A-3 Skywarrior.

The most notable successes of the T40 were in the field of vertical take-off aircraft, being used to power three different types, the Convair XFY Pogo, Lockheed XFV and the Hiller X-18 tilt-wing research aircraft. Fitted with the more powerful 7,100shp YT40-A-6 the XFY-1 flew the first full flight from vertical take-off to horizontal flight and back to vertical flight for landing, of a fixed wing aircraft, in November 1954. Continuing concerns over propellers and the poor payload and performance precluded further development.

Some flying was carried out with the Hiller X-18 but most research was carried out with the aircraft attached firmly to a force measuring platform, that could be raised hydraulically, to gather data on ground cushion effects.

Limited flying was carried out by the two Republic XF-84H Thunderscreech turboprop fighter aircraft, but the continuing difficulties with the T40 engine, supersonic propeller, not to mention performance completely overshadowed by contemporary rivals led to cancellation of production plans.

== Applications ==
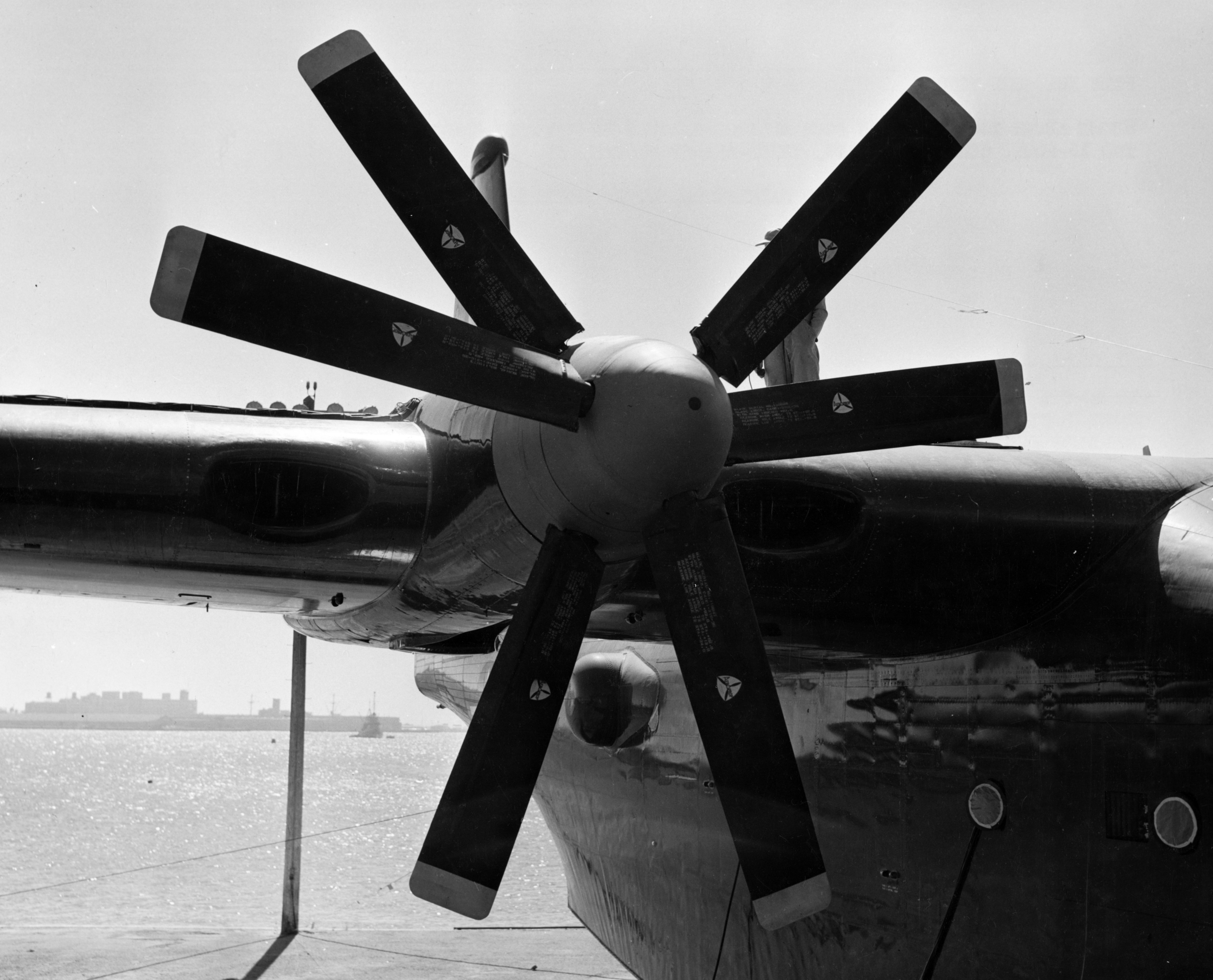
A T40 of a Convair XP5Y-1.

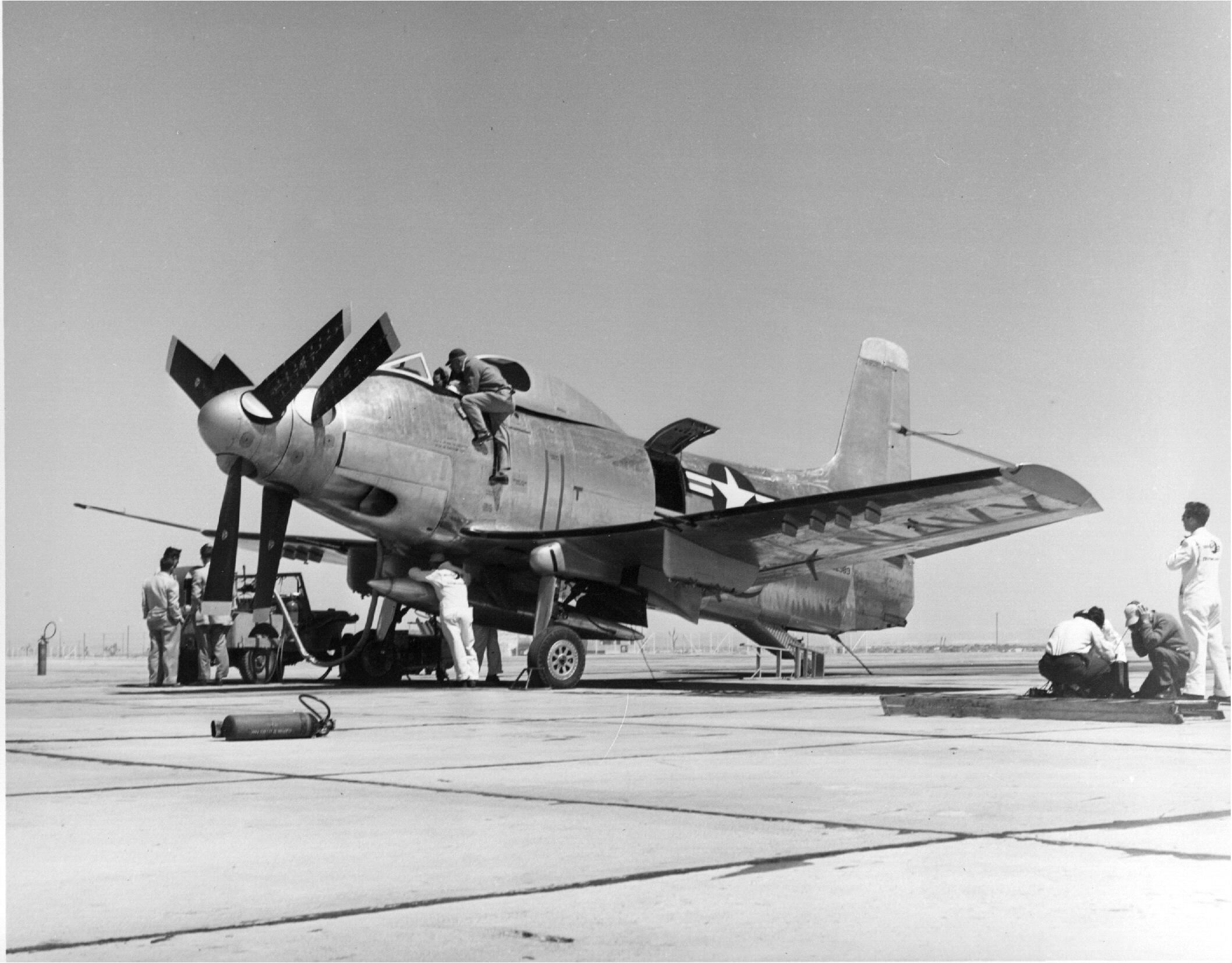
Second Douglas A2D being prepared for its first flight in April 1952.

Data from:

- Convair P5Y and R3Y
- Convair XFY Pogo
- Douglas A2D Skyshark
- Hiller X-18
- Lockheed XFV
- North American XA2J Super Savage
- Republic XF-84H Thunderscreech

== Variants ==
Model 500
Company designation for the T40
Model 501
Company designation for the T38 (half a T40, for development of the T40)
Model 501-D
Company designation for the T56
Model 503
Company designation for the T44
XT40-A-1
XT40-A-2
T40-A-4
XT40-A-5
XT40-A-6
XT40-A-10
YT40-A-14
T40-A-20
T40-A-22
T44
(Model 503), with three power sections; none were built and the project was cancelled.
T54-A-2
Re-designed T40 giving 7,500 shp (5,600 kW) equivalent. After the initial limited success of the T40 the US Navy sponsored development of a new turboprop about 28% larger than the T40, but this work was soon overtaken by the Allison T56 / Allison 501-D and development was cancelled.
T56
(Model 501-D) Successful development of the T40 / T38 with a single power section.

== Specifications (T40-A-6) ==
Data from Aircraft engines of the World 1953 Turbojet History and Development 1930–1960 vol.2

==== General characteristics ====
- Type: Turboprop
- Length: 167 in (4,200 mm) with gearbox; 84 in (2,100 mm) (power section)
- Diameter: 23.5 in (600 mm) (gearbox)
- Width: 39 in (990 mm) (power section)
- Height: 25 in (640 mm) (power section)
- Dry weight: 2,500 lb (1,100 kg) (power section)

==== Components ====
- Compressor: 17-stage axial flow (2 of)
- Combustors: 8 can-type per power-section
- Turbine: 4-stage axial flow (2 of)
- Fuel type: 100/130 Gasoline or Kerosene based jet fuel
- Oil system: dry sump, 65 psi (450 kPa) pressure spray, scavenged

==== Performance ====
- Maximum power output: 5,100 shp (3,800 kW) + 830 lbf (3.7 kN) for take-off at 14,300 rpm at sea level; 5,500 shp (4,100 kW) equivalent
- Overall pressure ratio: 6.3:1
- Specific fuel consumption: 0.63 lb/(hp⋅h) (0.38 kg/kWh) (equivalent shp)
- Power-to-weight ratio: 2.222 hp/lb (3.653 kW/kg)</li.
- Gearbox: Combining gearbox to drive contra-rotating propellers at 0.0635:1 (908 rpm for take-off)

== See also ==
Related development

- Allison T38
- Allison T56

Comparable engines

- Armstrong Siddeley Double Mamba
- Pratt & Whitney Canada PT6T
- Teledyne CAE T67

Related lists

- List of aircraft engines
