= Allison T38 =

Early turboprop engine

T38
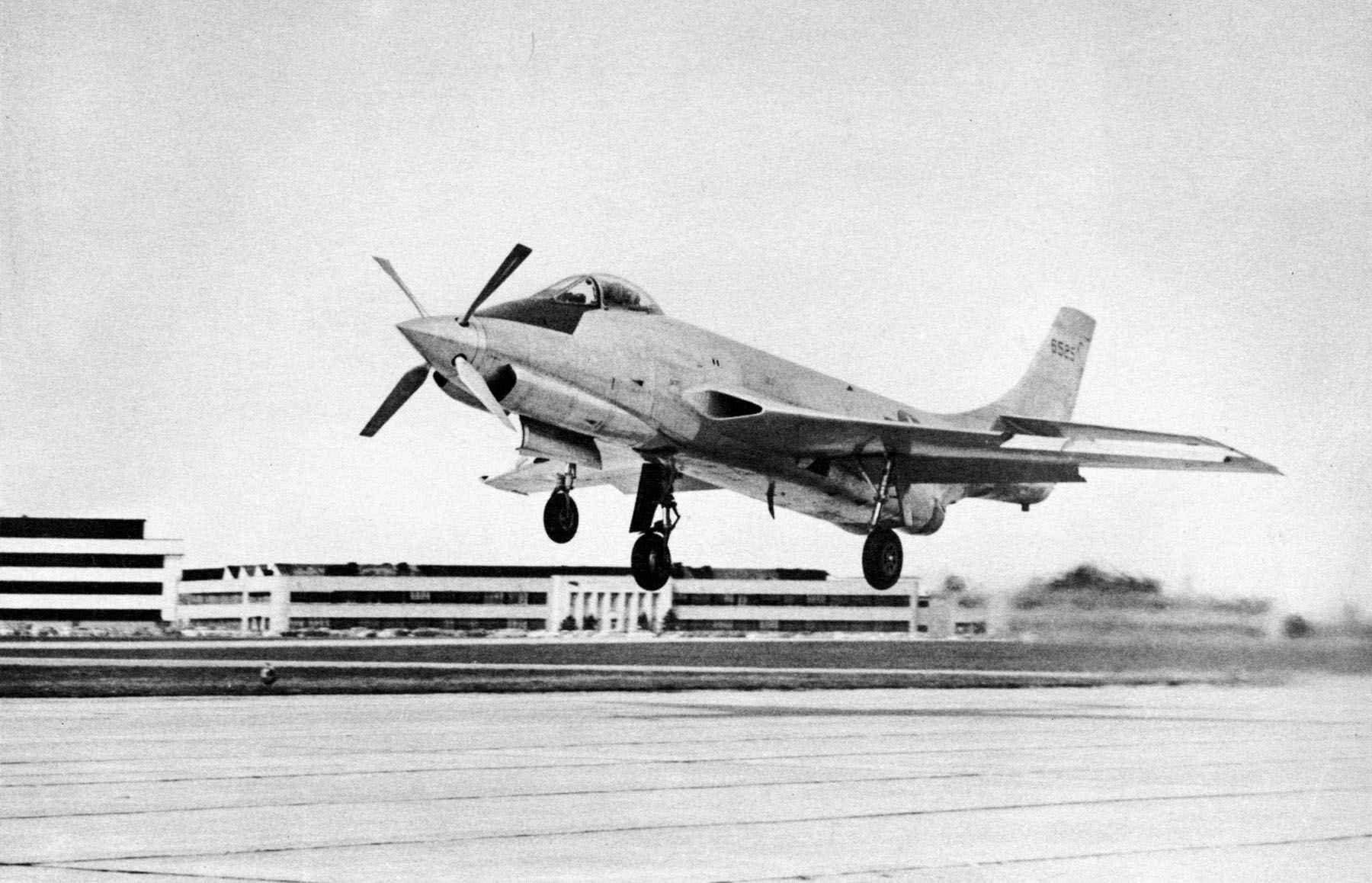
- The McDonnell XF-88B with a T38 turboprop in the nose
- Type: Turboshaft
- National origin: United States
- Manufacturer: Allison Engine Company
- Major applications: CV-240-21 Turboliner; McDonnell XF-88B
- Developed into: Allison T56
- Variants: Allison T40

The Allison T38 (company Model 501) was an early turboprop engine developed by Allison Engine Company during the late 1940s. The T38 became the basis for the very successful family of Allison T56 turboprop engine.

== Design and development ==
Developed as a stand-alone single section of the T40 (Model 500) twin engine to aid in development of the T40, the T38 started life with a 19-stage axial compressor, eight can type combustion chambers, a 4-stage turbine driving the compressor and the extension shaft to the reduction gearbox.

Initially rated at 2,000 shp (1,500 kW) the T38 first ran in 1947 and flew in the nose of a Boeing B-17 Flying Fortress test-bed on 19 April 1949, rated at 2,250 shp (1,680 kW). Problems with gearbox vibration and combustion were dealt with during the test program and were mirrored by problems with the T40, which had a pair of T38 power sections feeding a common gearbox. The engines fitted to the Convair CV-240-21 Turboliner were rated to 2,750 shp (2,050 kW) equivalent.

In 1951, the United States Air Force decided that the production version of the Beechcraft XT-36 trainer—then in the mockup stage and designed for the Pratt & Whitney R-2800—would be retrofitted with the T38 when the engine entered full-scale production, which was anticipated to occur in 1955–1960. This decision ultimately doomed the aircraft, as the design changes required to accommodate the T38 delayed the project and rendered the aircraft overweight and over budget.

Although the only other aircraft slated to receive the T38 as a production engine, the Convair T-29E, was cancelled, the T38 did power a converted Convair CV-240 (the CV-240-21 Turboliner, a project that would be abandoned due to engine problems), and was fitted in the nose of the McDonnell XF-88B to drive experimental supersonic propellers. Further development of the T38 provided the power sections for the Allison T40 as well as forming the basis for the Allison T56/Model 501 and the projected Allison T39.

== Variants ==
Model 501-B7
commercial version of the T38-A-6
XT38
prototypes of the engine, single engine section of the T40, to assist in the development of the T40.
XT38-A-2
XT38-A-5
Turboprop fitted to the McDonnell XF-88B.
T38-A-6
Military version of 501-B7
T38-A-10
1,800 shp (1,300 kW) turboshaft version for the Piasecki YH-16A Transporter
T39
(Model 504) A projected 9,000 shp (6,711.30 kW) development of the T38 which was cancelled before hardware had been produced.
T40
(Model 500) The 4,100 shp (3,057.37 kW) turboprop origin of the T38, composed of two power sections driving a common gearbox.
T44
(Model 503) large turboprop with three T38 engine sections.
T56
(Model 502) enlarged and improved version of the T38, destined to enter service by the tens of thousands.

== Applications ==
- Beechcraft XT-36 (planned for retrofit; project cancelled)
- Boeing B-17 Anudderone test-bed. mounted in the nose with a 3-bladed propeller.
- Convair CV-240-21 Turboliner
- McDonnell XF-88B
- Piasecki YH-16A Transporter

== Specifications (T38-A-6 / 501-B7) ==
Data from Aircraft engines of the World 1953

==== General characteristics ====
- Type: Turboprop / Turboshaft
- Length: 84 in (2,100 mm) engine section only
- Diameter: 28.1 in (710 mm) (gearbox diameter); 20 in (510 mm) engine section diameter
- Dry weight: 1,225 lb (556 kg) with extension shaft and gearbox

==== Components ====
- Compressor: 17-stage axial
- Combustors: 8 tubular inter-connected stainless steel combustion chambers
- Turbine: 4-stage axial discs of Timken 16-25-4 alloy with special alloy blades
- Fuel type: MIL-F-5572 100/130 Octane Gasoline
- Oil system: Dry sump, gear pump at 65 psi (4.5 bar) with scavenge pump; MIL-O-6081A

==== Performance ====
- Maximum power output: 2,550 shp (1,900 kW) + 415 lbf (1.85 kN) for take-off at 14,300 rpm at sea level (2,750 shp (2,050 kW) equivalent)
- Overall pressure ratio: 6.3:1
- Specific fuel consumption: 0.63 lb/(hp⋅h) (0.38 kg/kWh) (equivalent shp)
- Power-to-weight ratio: 2.273 hp/lb (3.737 kW/kg)

== See also ==
Related development

- Allison T40
- Allison T56

Related lists

- List of aircraft engines
