= George Jansen =

American test pilot

George Jansen was a test pilot during the golden age of flight test at Edwards Air Force Base from the late 1940s through the 1950s. He not only flew as test pilot for many experimental planes such as the Douglas A2D Skyshark but also flew drop planes such as the B-29 Superfortress for other flight tests such as carrying the Douglas D-558-2 Skyrocket piloted by Bill Bridgeman.

Born in Willows, California in 1921, he learned to fly crop dusting planes at the Nolta Air Service. In 1941 he entered the Army Air Corps.

Jansen flew B-24 Liberators from England during World War II including the famous Ploesti Raid. After the war he Joined Douglas Aircraft Co. as a test pilot, flying many aircraft including the A2D, A3D, B-66 and the B-29 drop plane for the rocket powered Douglas D-558-II Skyrocket, which set an altitude record of over 79,000 ft. at a speed of Mach 1.4.

He later became the head of flight test for Douglas Aircraft and flew the maiden flights of commercial aircraft like the DC9 and DC10 from the Douglas Long Beach Facility.

After his death in the 1990s he was honored with a Plaque in Lancaster, California near Edwards Air Force Base.
