= Douglas A2D Skyshark =

Prototype carrier-based attack aircraft

A2D Skyshark
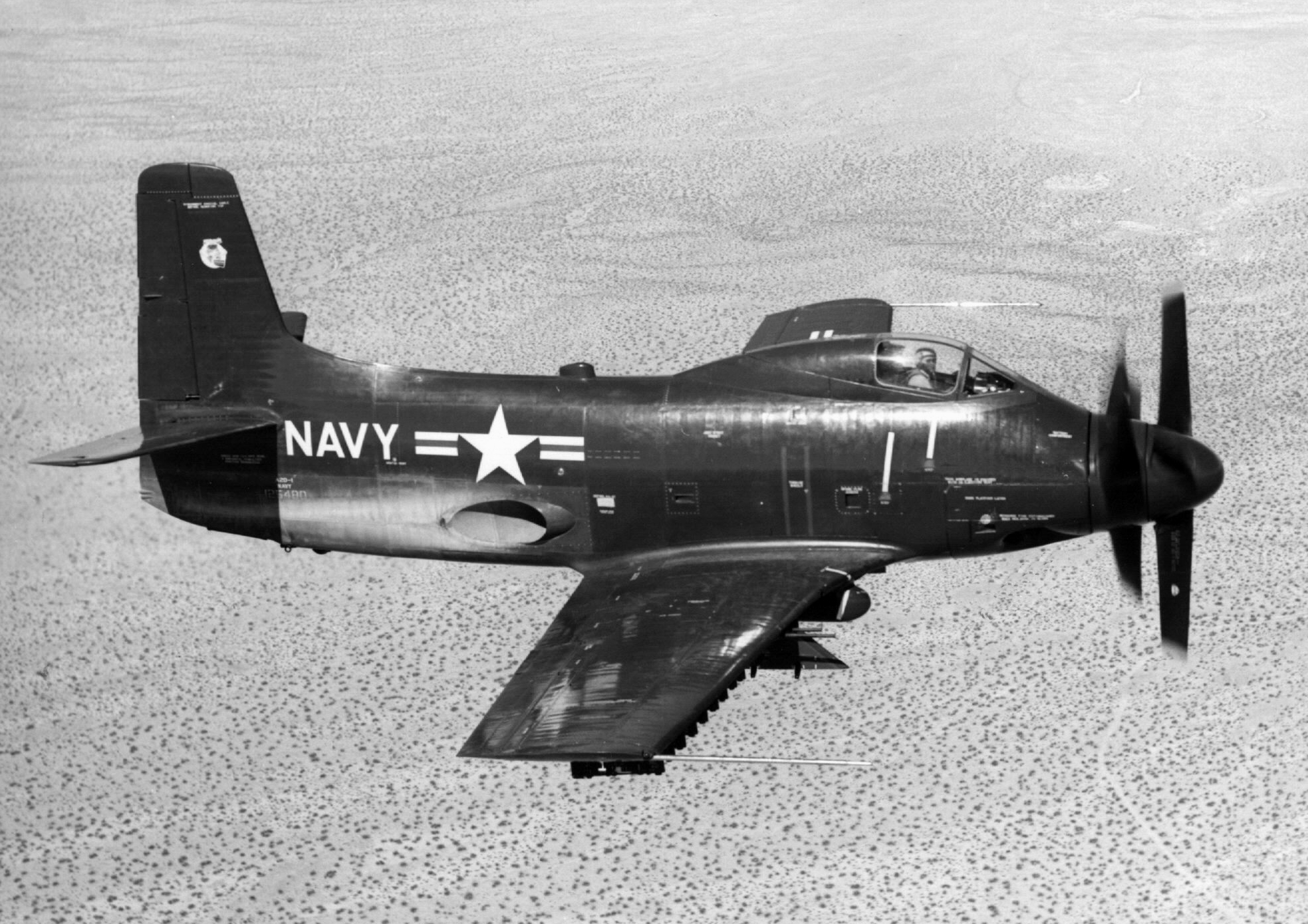
- A production A2D-1 in flight

General information
- Type: Attack aircraft
- National origin: United States
- Manufacturer: Douglas Aircraft Company
- Status: Canceled
- Primary user: United States Navy
- Number built: 2 XA2D-1 prototypes + 10 A2D-1 pre-production aircraft (4 of which never flew)

History
- First flight: 26 May 1950
- Developed from: Douglas A-1 Skyraider

The Douglas A2D Skyshark is an American turboprop-powered attack aircraft built by the Douglas Aircraft Company for the United States Navy. The program was substantially delayed by engine reliability problems, and was canceled because more promising jet attack aircraft had entered development and the smaller escort carriers the A2D was intended to utilize were being phased out.

== Design and development ==
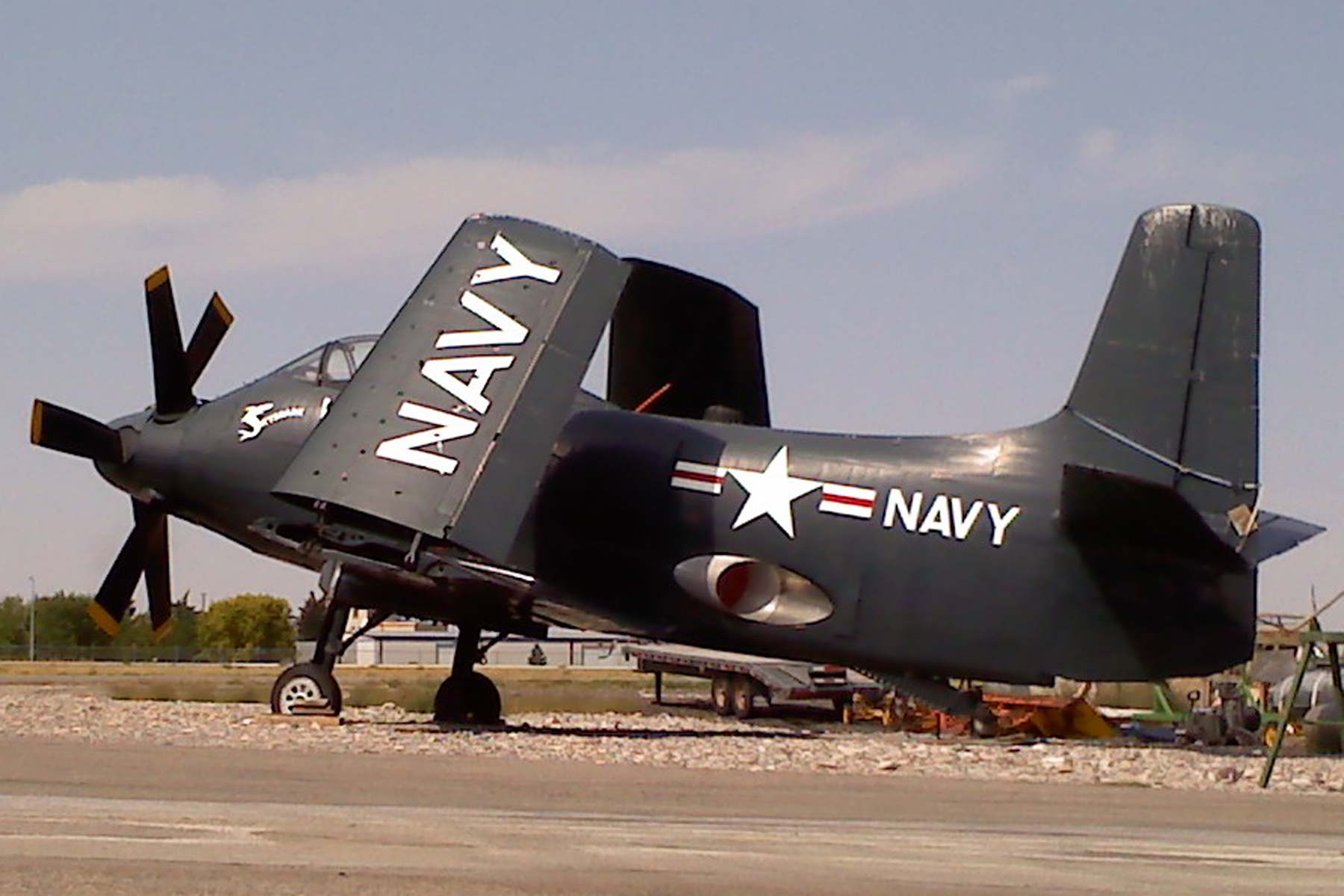
Douglas A2D-1 Skyshark BuNo. 125485 (seventh of 10 pre-production aircraft) at Idaho Falls Regional Airport

On 25 June 1945, the Bureau of Aeronautics (BuAer) asked Douglas Aircraft for a turboprop-driven aircraft. Three proposals were put forth in the next year and a half: the D-557A, to use two General Electric TG-100s (T31s) in wing nacelles; the D-557B, the same engine, with contra-rotating propellers; and the D-557C, to use the Westinghouse 25D. These were canceled due to engine development difficulties, but BuAer continued to seek an answer to the high fuel-consumption of jet aircraft.

On 11 June 1947 Douglas received the Navy's letter of intent for a carrier-based turboprop. The need to operate from Casablanca-class escort carriers dictated the use of a turboprop instead of jet power.

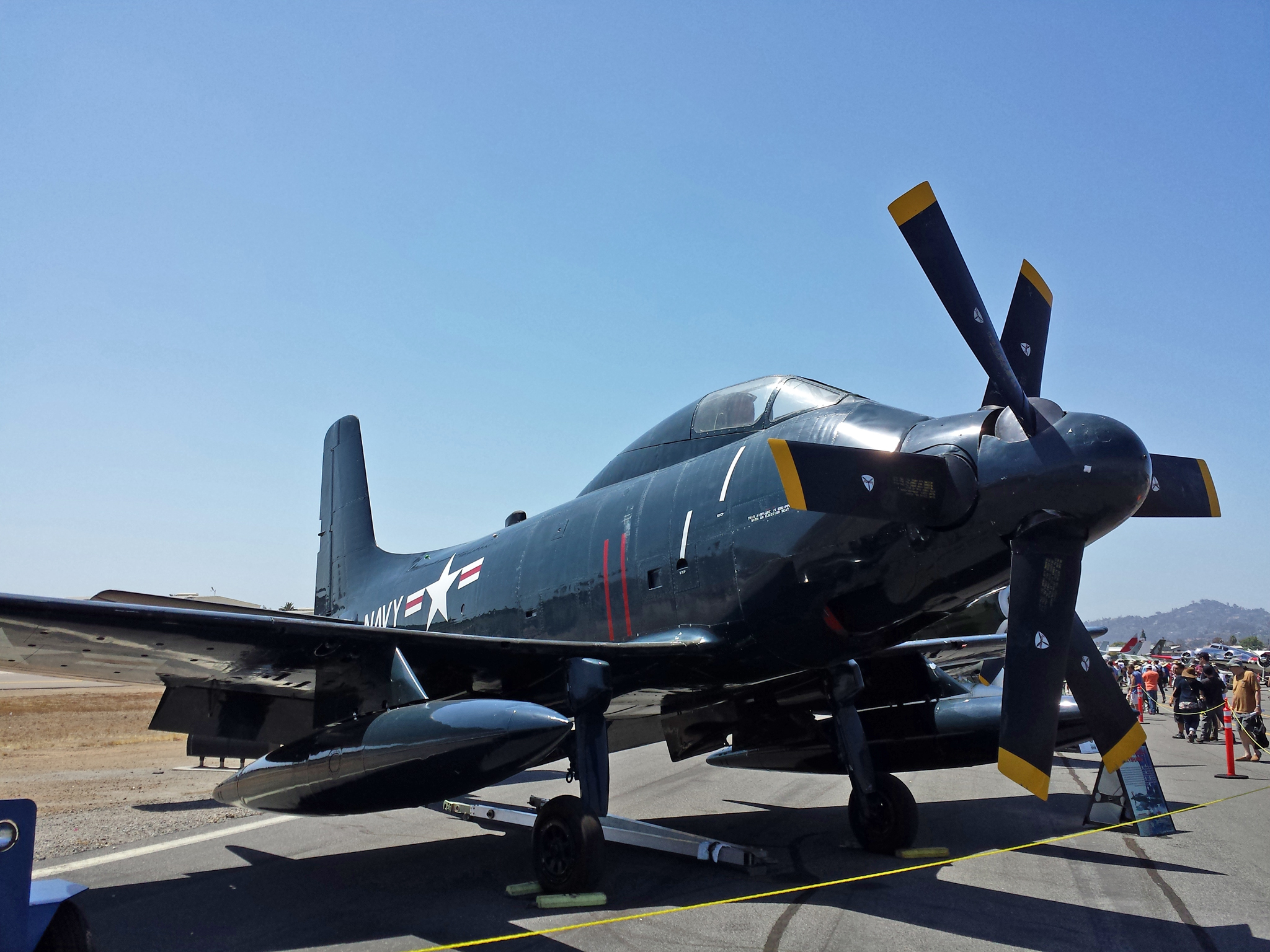
The sole surviving A2D-1 Skyshark on display in 2014

While it resembled the AD Skyraider, the A2D was different in a number of unseen ways. The 5,100-equivalent shaft horsepower (3,800 kW) Allison XT40-A2 engine had more than double the horsepower of the Skyraider's R-3350. The XT40 installation on the Skyshark used contra-rotating propellers to harness all the available power. Wing root thickness decreased from 17% to 12%, while both the height of the tail and its area grew.

Engine development problems delayed the first flight until 26 May 1950, made at Edwards Air Force Base by George Jansen.

Navy test pilot Cdr. Hugh Wood was killed attempting to land the first prototype XA2D-1, BuNo 122988, on 19 December 1950, on its 15th flight. He was unable to check the rate of descent, resulting in a high-impact crash on the runway. The investigation found the starboard power section of the coupled Allison XT40A turboprop engine had failed and did not declutch. This meant the surviving engine was powering the failed engine's compressor, using up much of its available power. Additionally, the propellers failed to feather. As the wings' lift disappeared, a fatal sink rate was induced.

Additional instrumentation and an automatic decoupler was added to the second prototype, but by the time it was ready to fly on 3 April 1952, sixteen months had passed, and with all-jet designs being developed, the A2D program was essentially dead. Total flight time on the lost airframe was barely 20 hours.

Allison failed to deliver a "production" engine until 1953, and while testing an XA2D with that engine, test pilot C. G. "Doc" Livingston pulled out of a dive and was surprised by a loud noise and pitch up. His windscreen was covered with oil and the chase pilot told Livingston that the propellers were gone. The gearbox had failed, but Livingston successfully landed the airplane. The A4D was ready to fly by the summer of 1954, but the escort carriers were being mothballed, so time had run out for the troubled A2D program.

Twelve Skysharks were built, two prototypes and ten pre-production aircraft. Most were scrapped or destroyed in accidents, and only one has survived.

== Aircraft on display ==
- A2D-1 Skyshark, BuNo. 125485, is at the Gillespie Field Annex of the San Diego Air & Space Museum in El Cajon, California. It was restored for static display by Pacific Fighters.

== Specifications (A2D-1) ==
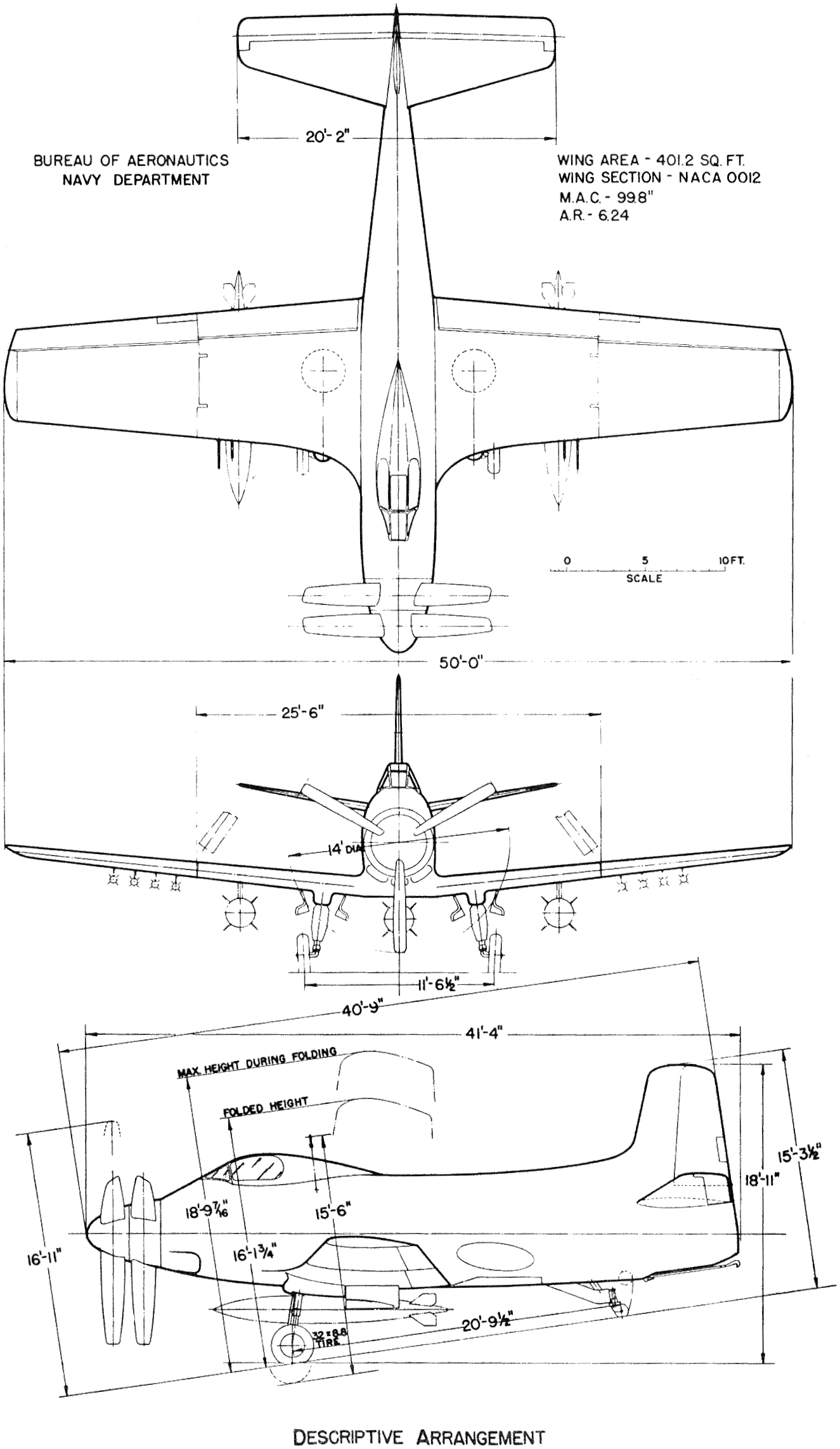
3-view line drawing of the Douglas A2D-1 Skyshark

Data from Francillon 1988, pp. 441–443

General characteristics

- Crew: 1
- Length: 41 ft 2 in (12.55 m)
- Wingspan: 50 ft 0 in (15.24 m)
- Height: 17 ft 1 in (5.21 m)
- Wing area: 400 sq ft (37 m^{2})
- Airfoil: NACA 0012
- Empty weight: 12,944 lb (5,871 kg)
- Gross weight: 18,720 lb (8,491 kg)
- Max takeoff weight: 22,966 lb (10,417 kg)
- Fuel capacity: 500 US gal (420 imp gal; 1,900 L), plus 3 × 100 US gal (83 imp gal; 380 L) drop tanks
- Powerplant: 1 × Allison XT40-A-2 turboprop, 5,500 shp (4,100 kW) equivalent - (5,100 shp (3,800 kW) + 830 lbf (3.7 kN) residual thrust)
- Propellers: 6-bladed Aeroproducts, 14 ft (4.3 m) diameter contra-rotating constant-speed fully-feathering reversible-pitch propeller

Performance

- Maximum speed: 492 mph (792 km/h, 428 kn) at 17,592 lb (7,980 kg) at 40,000 ft (12,000 m)
- Maximum speed at sea level: 477.5 mph (414.9 kn; 768.5 km/h) at 17,592 lb (7,980 kg)
- Cruise speed: 276 mph (444 km/h, 240 kn)
- Stall speed: 100.5 mph (161.7 km/h, 87.3 kn) at 17,592 lb (7,980 kg)
- Combat range: 512 mi (824 km, 445 nmi) at 17,592 lb (7,980 kg) at 338 mph (294 kn; 544 km/h)
- Ferry range: 2,200 mi (3,500 km, 1,900 nmi)
- Service ceiling: 48,300 ft (14,700 m) at 17,592 lb (7,980 kg)
- Rate of climb: 7,960 ft/min (40.4 m/s) at 17,592 lb (7,980 kg) s.l.
- Wing loading: 46.8 lb/sq ft (228 kg/m^{2})
- Power/mass: 0.333 shp/lb (0.547 kW/kg)
- Take-off field distance sea level hot: 465 ft (142 m) at 17,592 lb (7,980 kg)
- Take-off distance to 50 ft (15 m): 940 ft (290 m) at 17,592 lb (7,980 kg)
- Take-off distance to 50 ft (15 m) hot: 1,350 ft (410 m) at 17,592 lb (7,980 kg)

Armament

- Guns: 4 × 20 mm (0.8 in) T31 cannon
- Hardpoints: 13 with a capacity of 5,500 lb (2,500 kg)

== See also ==
Related development

- Douglas A-1 Skyraider

Aircraft of comparable role, configuration, and era

- Breguet Alizé
- Fairey Gannet
- Tupolev Tu-91
- Westland Wyvern

Related lists

- List of attack aircraft
- List of United States Navy aircraft designations (pre-1962)
- List of military aircraft of the United States

== Bibliography ==
- Allen, Francis (Spring 1994). "Shark With No Teeth: The Story of the Douglas A2D Skyshark". Air Enthusiast. No. 53. pp. 69–75. ISSN 0143-5450.
- Francillon, René J. McDonnell Douglas Aircraft Since 1920: Volume I. Annapolis, Maryland: Naval Institute Press, 1988. ISBN 0-87021-428-4.
- Heinemann, Edward, H. and Rausa, Rosario. Combat Aircraft Designer. London: Jane's Publishing, 1980. ISBN 0-7106-0040-2.
- Markgraf, Gerry. Douglas Skyshark, A2D Turbo-Prop Attack (Naval Fighters No. 43). Simi Valley, CA: Ginter Books, 1997. ISBN 0-942612-43-4.
- McCullough, Anson. "Skyshark", Wings 25(5), October 1995, pages 18–20
