= July 17 =

July 17 this year in various calendars
- Friday, 17 July 2026
Akan	Nwonafie
Armenian	2 Aweleach 1475
Aztec	Quecholli 8, 7 Cōzcacuāuhtli
Babylonian	2 Du'uzu, 2337 SE
Balinese pawukon	Menga, Beteng, Laba, Keliwon, Aryang, Sukra of Pujut, Brahma, Jangur, Sri
Bengali	2 Shrabon, BS 1433
Chinese	Yang Water Dragon・Ghost Mansion; Fire Horse Year, Month 6, Day 4 (Xiaoshu, 6 days until Dashu)
Common Era	17 July 2026 CE
Coptic	10 Epip, AM 1742
Egyptian	2 Choiak, 2775 NE
Ethiopian	10 Ḥamlē, 2018 Amätä Məhrät
French Republican	Décade III, Nonidi de Messidor de l'Année 234 de la République
Gregorian	17 July, AD 2026
Hebrew	3 Av, AM 5786
Hindu	Maghā・Siddhi; Solar: 1 Śrāvaṇa, 1948 SE; Lunisolar: Tr̥tīyā, Śukla pakṣa of Āṣāḍha, 2083 VE; Rāudra・5127 KY・1,872,773
Icelandic	Föstudagur, 26 Sólmánuður 2026
Islamic	1 Safar, AH 1448 (using tabular method)
ISO week date	2026-W29-5
Japanese	4 Minazuki, Reiwa 8 (Shōsho, 6 days until Taisho)
Julian	4 July, AD 2026 (AM 7534)
Julian day	2461239
Korean	4 Yangdal, 4359 DE
Maya	13.0.13.13.16; 9 Xul, 7 Cib
Roman	ante diem IV Nonas Iulias, MMDCCLXXIX AUC
Solar Hijri	26 Tir, SH 1405
Tibetan	3 chu stod, me pho rta 2153 or 1772 or 1000

<<	July					>>
Su	Mo	Tu	We	Th	Fr	Sa
			1	2	3	4
5	6	7	8	9	10	11
12	13	14	15	16	17	18
19	20	21	22	23	24	25
26	27	28	29	30	31
2026

July 17 in recent years
2026 (Friday)
2025 (Thursday)
2024 (Wednesday)
2023 (Monday)
2022 (Sunday)
2021 (Saturday)
2020 (Friday)
2019 (Wednesday)
2018 (Tuesday)
2017 (Monday)

July 17 is the 198th day of the year (199th in leap years) in the Gregorian calendar; 167 days remain until the end of the year.

== Events ==
=== Pre-1600 ===
- 180 – Twelve inhabitants of Scillium (near Kasserine, modern-day Tunisia) in North Africa are executed for being Christians. This is the earliest record of Christianity in that part of the world.
- 561 – Consecration of Pope John III following the death of Pope Pelagius I earlier that year.
- 1048 – Damasus II is elected pope, and dies 23 days later.
- 1048 – Four year-old Henry IV is crowned as king of Germany in Aachen.
- 1203 – The Fourth Crusade assaults Constantinople. The Byzantine emperor Alexios III Angelos flees from his capital into exile.
- 1402 – Zhu Di, better known by his era name as the Yongle Emperor, assumes the throne over the Ming dynasty of China.
- 1429 – Hundred Years' War: Charles VII of France is crowned the King of France in the Reims Cathedral after a successful campaign by Joan of Arc.
- 1453 – Battle of Castillon: The last battle of the Hundred Years' War, the French under Jean Bureau defeat the English under the Earl of Shrewsbury, who is killed in the battle in Gascony.
- 1489 – Sikandar Lodi succeeds Bahlul Khan Lodi as Sultan of Delhi.

=== 1601–1900 ===
- 1717 – King George I of Great Britain sails down the River Thames with a barge of 50 musicians, where George Frideric Handel's Water Music is premiered.
- 1762 – Former emperor Peter III of Russia is murdered.
- 1771 – Bloody Falls massacre: Chipewyan chief Matonabbee, traveling as the guide to Samuel Hearne on his Arctic overland journey, massacres a group of unsuspecting Inuit.
- 1791 – Members of the French National Guard under the command of General Lafayette open fire on a crowd of radical Jacobins at the Champ de Mars, Paris, during the French Revolution, killing scores of people.
- 1794 – The 16 Carmelite Martyrs of Compiègne are executed ten days prior to the end of the French Revolution's Reign of Terror.
- 1821 – The Kingdom of Spain cedes the territory of Florida to the United States.
- 1850 – Vega becomes the first star (other than the Sun) to be photographed.
- 1867 – Harvard School of Dental Medicine is established in Boston, Massachusetts. It is the first dental school in the U.S. that is affiliated with a university.
- 1899 – NEC Corporation is organized as the first Japanese joint venture with foreign capital.

=== 1901–present ===
- 1918 – Tsar Nicholas II of Russia and his immediate family and retainers are executed by Bolshevik Chekists at the Ipatiev House in Yekaterinburg, Russia.
- 1918 – The RMS Carpathia is sunk off Ireland by the German SM U-55; five lives are lost.
- 1919 – The form of government in the Republic of Finland is officially confirmed with the enactment of the Constitution of Finland. For this reason, July 17 is known as the Day of Democracy (Kansanvallan päivä) in Finland.
- 1932 – Altona Bloody Sunday: A riot between the Nazi Party paramilitary forces, the SS and SA, and the German Communist Party ensues.
- 1936 – Spanish Civil War: An Armed Forces rebellion against the recently elected leftist Popular Front government of Spain starts the civil war.
- 1938 – Douglas Corrigan takes off from Brooklyn to fly the "wrong way" to Ireland and becomes known as "Wrong Way" Corrigan.
- 1944 – Port Chicago disaster: Near the San Francisco Bay, two ships laden with ammunition for the war explode in Port Chicago, California, killing 320.
- 1945 – World War II: The main three leaders of the Allied nations, Winston Churchill, Harry S. Truman and Joseph Stalin, hold the Potsdam Conference in the German city of Potsdam to decide the future of a defeated Germany.
- 1953 – The largest number of United States midshipman casualties in a single event results from an aircraft crash in Florida, killing 44.
- 1954 – First Indochina War: Viet Minh troops successfully ambush the armoured French column 'G.M. 42' in the Battle of Chu Dreh Pass in the Central Highlands. It is the last battle of the war.
- 1962 – Nuclear weapons testing: The "Small Boy" test shot Little Feller I becomes the last atmospheric test detonation at the Nevada National Security Site.
- 1968 – Abdul Rahman Arif is overthrown and the Ba'ath Party is installed as the governing power in Iraq with Ahmed Hassan al-Bakr as the new Iraqi President.
- 1973 – King Mohammed Zahir Shah of Afghanistan, while having surgery in Italy, is deposed by his cousin Mohammed Daoud Khan.
- 1975 – Apollo–Soyuz Test Project: An American Apollo and a Soviet Soyuz spacecraft dock with each other in orbit marking the first such link-up between spacecraft from the two nations.
- 1976 – East Timor is annexed and becomes the 27th province of Indonesia.
- 1976 – The opening of the Summer Olympics in Montreal is marred by 25 African teams boycotting the games because of New Zealand's participation. Contrary to rulings by other international sports organizations, the IOC had declined to exclude New Zealand because of their participation in South African sporting events during apartheid.
- 1981 – A structural failure leads to the collapse of a walkway at the Hyatt Regency in Kansas City, Missouri, killing 114 people and injuring more than 200.
- 1994 – Brazil win their fourth World Cup title, defeating Italy 3–2 on penalties.
- 1996 – TWA Flight 800: Off the coast of Long Island, New York, a Paris-bound TWA Boeing 747 explodes, killing all 230 on board.
- 1997 – After takeoff from Husein Sastranegara International Airport, Sempati Air Flight 304 crashes into a residential neighborhood in Bandung, killing 28 people.
- 1998 – The 7.0 M_{w} Papua New Guinea earthquake triggers a tsunami that destroys ten villages in Papua New Guinea, killing up to 2,700 people, and leaving several thousand injured.
- 1998 – A diplomatic conference adopts the Rome Statute of the International Criminal Court, establishing the permanent international court in The Hague, to prosecute individuals for genocide, crimes against humanity, war crimes, and the crime of aggression.
- 2000 – During approach to Lok Nayak Jayaprakash Airport, Alliance Air Flight 7412 suddenly crashes into a residential neighborhood in Patna, India, killing 60 people.
- 2006 – The 7.7 M_{w} Pangandaran tsunami earthquake severely affects the Indonesian island of Java, killing 668 people, and leaving more than 9,000 injured.
- 2007 – TAM Airlines Flight 3054, an Airbus A320, crashes into a warehouse after landing too fast and missing the end of the São Paulo–Congonhas Airport runway, killing 199 people.
- 2014 – Malaysia Airlines Flight 17, a Boeing 777, crashes near the border of Ukraine and Russia after being shot down. All 298 people on board are killed.
- 2014 – A French regional train on the Pau-Bayonne line crashes into a high-speed train near the town of Denguin, resulting in at least 25 injuries.
- 2014 – Eric Garner is killed by police officer Daniel Pantaleo in New York City, after the latter put him in a prohibited chokehold while arresting him.
- 2015 – At least 120 people are killed and 130 injured by a suicide bombing in Diyala Governorate, Iraq.

== Births ==
=== Pre-1600 ===
- 1487 – Ismail I of Iran (died 1524)
- 1499 – Maria Salviati, Italian noblewoman (died 1543)
- 1531 – Antoine de Créqui Canaples, Roman Catholic cardinal (died 1574)

=== 1601–1900 ===
- 1674 – Isaac Watts, English hymnwriter and theologian (died 1748)
- 1695 – Christian Karl Reinhard of Leiningen-Dachsburg-Falkenburg-Heidesheim (died 1766)
- 1698 – Pierre Louis Maupertuis, French mathematician and philosopher (died 1759)
- 1708 – Frederick Christian, Margrave of Brandenburg-Bayreuth (died 1769)
- 1714 – Alexander Gottlieb Baumgarten, German philosopher and academic (died 1762)
- 1744 – Elbridge Gerry, American merchant and politician, 5th Vice President of the United States (died 1814)
- 1763 – John Jacob Astor, German-American businessman and philanthropist (died 1848)
- 1774 – John Wilbur, American minister and theologian (died 1856)
- 1797 – Paul Delaroche, French painter and academic (died 1856)
- 1823 – Leander Clark, American businessman, judge, and politician (died 1910)
- 1831 – Xianfeng Emperor of China (died 1861)
- 1831 – Naser al-Din Shah of Qajar Iran (died 1896)
- 1837 – Joseph-Alfred Mousseau, Canadian lawyer, judge, and politician, 7th Secretary of State for Canada (died 1886)
- 1839 – Ephraim Shay, American engineer, invented the Shay locomotive (died 1916)
- 1853 – Alexius Meinong, Ukrainian-Austrian philosopher and academic (died 1920)
- 1868 – Henri Nathansen, Danish director and playwright (died 1944)
- 1870 – Charles Davidson Dunbar, Scottish soldier and bagpipe player (died 1939)
- 1871 – Lyonel Feininger, German-American painter and illustrator (died 1956)
- 1873 – Many Benner, French painter (died 1965)
- 1882 – James Somerville, English admiral and politician, Lord Lieutenant of Somerset (died 1949)
- 1888 – Shmuel Yosef Agnon, Ukrainian-Israeli novelist, short story writer and poet, Nobel Prize laureate (died 1970)
- 1889 – Erle Stanley Gardner, American lawyer and author (died 1970)
- 1894 – Georges Lemaître, Belgian priest, astronomer, and cosmologist (died 1966)
- 1896 – Rupert Atkinson, English RAF officer (died 1919)
- 1898 – Berenice Abbott, American photographer (died 1991)
- 1898 – Osmond Borradaile, Canadian soldier and cinematographer (died 1999)
- 1899 – James Cagney, American actor and dancer (died 1986)

=== 1901–present ===
- 1901 – Luigi Chinetti, Italian-American race car driver (died 1994)
- 1901 – Bruno Jasieński, Polish poet and author (died 1938)
- 1901 – Patrick Smith, Irish farmer and politician, Minister for Agriculture, Food and the Marine (died 1982)
- 1902 – Christina Stead, Australian author and academic (died 1983)
- 1905 – William Gargan, American actor (died 1979)
- 1910 – James Coyne, Canadian lawyer and banker, 2nd Governor of the Bank of Canada (died 2012)
- 1910 – Frank Olson, American chemist and microbiologist (died 1953)
- 1911 – Lionel Ferbos, American trumpet player (died 2014)
- 1911 – Heinz Lehmann, German-Canadian psychiatrist and academic (died 1999)
- 1912 – Erwin Bauer, German race car driver (died 1958)
- 1912 – Art Linkletter, Canadian-American radio and television host (died 2010)
- 1913 – Bertrand Goldberg, American architect, designed the Marina City Building (died 1997)
- 1914 – Eleanor Steber, American soprano and educator (died 1990)
- 1915 – Bijon Bhattacharya, Indian actor, singer, and screenwriter (died 1978)
- 1915 – Arthur Rothstein, American photographer and educator (died 1985)
- 1916 – Eleanor Hadley, American economist and policymaker (died 2007)
- 1917 – Lou Boudreau, American baseball player and manager (died 2001)
- 1917 – Phyllis Diller, American actress, comedian, and voice artist (died 2012)
- 1917 – Kenan Evren, Turkish general and politician, 7th President of Turkey (died 2015)
- 1917 – Christiane Rochefort, French author (died 1998)
- 1918 – Carlos Manuel Arana Osorio, Guatemalan soldier and politician, President of Guatemala (died 2003)
- 1919 – Albert Stubbins, English footballer (died 2002)
- 1920 – Gordon Gould, American physicist and academic, invented the laser (died 2005)
- 1920 – Juan Antonio Samaranch, Spanish businessman, 7th President of the International Olympic Committee (died 2010)
- 1921 – George Barnes, American guitarist, producer, and songwriter (died 1977)
- 1921 – Louis Lachenal, French mountaineer (died 1955)
- 1921 – Mary Osborne, American guitarist (died 1992)
- 1921 – Toni Stone, American baseball player (died 1996)
- 1921 – František Zvarík, Slovak actor (died 2008)
- 1923 – Jeanne Block, American psychologist (died 1981)
- 1923 – John Cooper, English car designer, co-founded the Cooper Car Company (died 2000)
- 1924 – Garde Gardom, Canadian lawyer and politician, 26th Lieutenant Governor of British Columbia (died 2013)
- 1925 – Jimmy Scott, American singer and actor (died 2014)
- 1925 – Mohammad Hasan Sharq, Afghan politician
- 1926 – Édouard Carpentier, French-Canadian wrestler (died 2010)
- 1926 – Willis Carto, American activist and theorist (died 2015)
- 1928 – Vince Guaraldi, American singer-songwriter and pianist (died 1976)
- 1928 – Joe Morello, American jazz drummer (Dave Brubeck Quartet - "Blue Rondo à la Turk") (died 2011)
- 1929 – Arthur Frommer, American travel writer (died 2024)
- 1929 – Sergei K. Godunov, Russian mathematician and academic (died 2023)
- 1932 – Niccolò Castiglioni, Italian composer (died 1996)
- 1932 – Red Kerr, American basketball player and coach (died 2009)
- 1932 – Wojciech Kilar, Polish pianist and composer (died 2013)
- 1932 – Karla Kuskin, American author and illustrator (died 2009)
- 1932 – Slick Leonard, American basketball player and coach (died 2021)
- 1932 – Ian Moir, Australian rugby league player (died 1990)
- 1932 – Quino, Spanish-Argentinian cartoonist (died 2020)
- 1932 – Hal Riney, American businessman, founded Publicis & Hal Riney (died 2008)
- 1933 – Keiko Awaji, Japanese actress (died 2014)
- 1933 – Karmenu Mifsud Bonnici, Maltese politician, 9th Prime Minister of Malta (died 2022)
- 1933 – Mimi Hines, Canadian singer and comedian (died 2024)
- 1933 – Tony Pithey, Zimbabwean-South African cricketer (died 2006)
- 1934 – Lucio Tan, Chinese-Filipino billionaire businessman and educator
- 1935 – Diahann Carroll, American actress and singer (died 2019)
- 1935 – Peter Schickele, American composer and educator (died 2024)
- 1935 – Donald Sutherland, Canadian actor and producer (died 2024)
- 1938 – Hermann Huppen, Belgian author and illustrator (died 2026)
- 1939 – Andrée Champagne, Canadian actress and politician (died 2020)
- 1939 – Spencer Davis, Welsh singer-songwriter and guitarist (died 2020)
- 1940 – Tim Brooke-Taylor, English actor and screenwriter (died 2020)
- 1940 – Verne Lundquist, American sportscaster
- 1941 – Daryle Lamonica, American football player (died 2022)
- 1941 – Bob Taylor, English cricketer
- 1941 – Achim Warmbold, German race car driver and manager
- 1942 – Gale Garnett, New Zealand–born Canadian singer
- 1942 – Connie Hawkins, American basketball player (died 2017)
- 1942 – Don Kessinger, American baseball player and manager
- 1942 – Zoot Money, English singer-songwriter and keyboard player (died 2024)
- 1943 – LaVyrle Spencer, American author and educator
- 1944 – Mark Burgess, New Zealand cricketer and footballer
- 1944 – Catherine Schell, Hungarian-English actress
- 1944 – Carlos Alberto Torres, Brazilian footballer and manager (died 2016)
- 1945 – Alexander, Crown Prince of Yugoslavia
- 1945 – John Patten, Baron Patten, English politician, Secretary of State for Education
- 1946 – Chris Crutcher, American novelist and short story writer
- 1946 – Ted Sampley, American POW/MIA activist (died 2009)
- 1947 – Joyce Anelay, Baroness Anelay of St John's, English educator and politician
- 1947 – Robert Begerau, German footballer and manager
- 1947 – Queen Camilla, Queen Consort of King Charles III of the United Kingdom
- 1947 – Wolfgang Flür, German musician (Kraftwerk)
- 1947 – Mick Tucker, English rock drummer (Sweet) (died 2002)
- 1948 – Ron Asheton, American guitarist and songwriter (died 2009)
- 1948 – Luc Bondy, Swiss director and producer (died 2015)
- 1949 – Geezer Butler, English bass player and songwriter
- 1949 – Charley Steiner, American journalist and sportscaster
- 1950 – Sadhan Chandra Majumder, Bangladeshi politician
- 1950 – Tengku Sulaiman Shah, Malaysian corporate figure
- 1950 – Phoebe Snow, American singer-songwriter and guitarist (died 2011)
- 1951 – Lucie Arnaz, American actress and singer
- 1951 – Mark Bowden, American journalist and author
- 1951 – Andrew Robathan, English soldier and politician, Minister of State for the Armed Forces
- 1952 – David Hasselhoff, American actor, singer, and producer
- 1952 – Nicolette Larson, American singer-songwriter (died 1997)
- 1952 – Thé Lau, Dutch singer-songwriter and guitarist (died 2015)
- 1952 – Robert R. McCammon, American author
- 1954 – Angela Merkel, German chemist and politician, Chancellor of Germany from 2005 to 2021.
- 1954 – Edward Natapei, Vanuatuan politician, 6th Prime Minister of Vanuatu (died 2015)
- 1954 – J. Michael Straczynski, American author, screenwriter, and producer
- 1955 – Sylvie Léonard, Canadian actress and screenwriter
- 1955 – Paul Stamets, American mycologist and author
- 1956 – Julie Bishop, Australian lawyer and politician, 38th Australian Minister for Foreign Affairs
- 1956 – Bryan Trottier, Canadian-American ice hockey player and coach
- 1957 – Bruce Crump, American drummer and songwriter (died 2015)
- 1957 – Wendy Freedman, Canadian-American cosmologist and astronomer
- 1958 – Wong Kar-wai, Chinese director, producer, and screenwriter
- 1958 – Suzanne Moore, English journalist
- 1958 – Thérèse Rein, Australian businesswoman, founded Ingeus
- 1958 – Susan Silver, American music manager
- 1959 – Pola Uddin, Baroness Uddin, Bangladeshi-English politician
- 1960 – Kim Barnett, English cricketer and coach
- 1960 – Mark Burnett, English-American screenwriter and producer
- 1960 – Nancy Giles, American journalist and actress
- 1960 – Robin Shou, Hong Kong martial artist and actor
- 1960 – Dawn Upshaw, American soprano
- 1960 – Jan Wouters, Dutch footballer and manager
- 1961 – António Costa, Portuguese politician, 119th Prime Minister of Portugal
- 1961 – Jeremy Hardy, English comedian and actor (died 2019)
- 1963 – Regina Belle, American singer-songwriter, producer, and actress
- 1963 – Letsie III of Lesotho
- 1963 – Matti Nykänen, Finnish ski jumper and singer (died 2019)
- 1964 – Heather Langenkamp, American actress and producer
- 1965 – Alex Winter, British-American actor
- 1966 – Sten Tolgfors, Swedish lawyer and politician, 30th Swedish Minister of Defence
- 1969 – Jason Clarke, Australian actor
- 1969 – Scott Johnson, American cartoonist
- 1969 – Jaan Kirsipuu, Estonian cyclist
- 1971 – Calbert Cheaney, American basketball player and coach
- 1971 – Cory Doctorow, Canadian author and activist
- 1971 – Nico Mattan, Belgian cyclist
- 1972 – Donny Marshall, American basketball player and sportscaster
- 1972 – Jaap Stam, Dutch footballer and manager
- 1972 – Eric Williams, American basketball player
- 1973 – Eric Moulds, American football player
- 1974 – Claudio López, Argentine footballer
- 1975 – Andre Adams, New Zealand cricketer
- 1975 – Elena Anaya, Spanish actress
- 1975 – Darude, Finnish DJ and producer
- 1975 – Loretta Harrop, Australian triathlete
- 1975 – Konnie Huq, English television presenter
- 1975 – Terence Tao, Australian-American mathematician
- 1975 – Carey Hart, American freestyle motorcycle racer
- 1976 – Luke Bryan, American singer-songwriter and guitarist
- 1976 – Gino D'Acampo, Italian chef and author
- 1976 – Dagmara Domińczyk, Polish-American actress
- 1976 – Marcos Senna, Brazilian-Spanish footballer
- 1976 – Anders Svensson, Swedish footballer and sportscaster
- 1976 – Brian K. Vaughan, American comic book and television writer
- 1976 – Eric Winter, American actor
- 1977 – Andrew Downton, Australian cricketer
- 1977 – Leif Hoste, Belgian cyclist
- 1977 – Marc Savard, Canadian ice hockey player
- 1978 – Ricardo Arona, Brazilian mixed martial artist
- 1978 – Jason Jennings, American baseball player
- 1978 – Justine Triet, French film director and screenwriter
- 1979 – Mike Vogel, American actor
- 1980 – Javier Camuñas, Spanish footballer
- 1980 – Brett Goldstein, British actor, comedian and writer
- 1980 – Ryan Miller, American ice hockey player
- 1981 – Hely Ollarves, Venezuelan runner
- 1982 – Omari Banks, Anguillan cricketer
- 1982 – Stefania Spampinato, Italian actress
- 1983 – Adam Lind, American baseball player
- 1985 – Loui Eriksson, Swedish ice hockey player
- 1985 – Neil McGregor, Scottish footballer
- 1985 – Tom Cullen, Welsh actor and director
- 1986 – DeAngelo Smith, American football player
- 1987 – Darius Boyd, Australian rugby league player
- 1987 – Jeremih, American singer, songwriter, and record producer
- 1991 – Oliver Ekman-Larsson, Swedish ice hockey player
- 1992 – Billie Lourd, American actress
- 1992 – Tatu Sinisalo, Finnish actor
- 1992 – Nick Bjugstad, American ice hockey player
- 1994 – Kali Uchis, American singer-songwriter
- 1996 – Wonwoo, South Korean rapper and singer
- 1996 – Grace Caroline Currey, American actress
- 1997 – OG Anunoby, British basketball player
- 1998 – Rosana Serrano, Cuban rower
- 2002 – Jordan Lawlar, American baseball player
- 2005 – Connor Bedard, Canadian ice hockey player

== Deaths ==
=== Pre-1600 ===
- 521 – Magnus Felix Ennodius, Gallo-Roman bishop
- 855 – Leo IV, pope of the Catholic Church (born 790)
- 952 – Wu Hanyue, Chinese noblewoman (born 913)
- 961 – Du, empress dowager of the Song dynasty
- 1070 – Baldwin VI, count of Flanders (born 1030)
- 1085 – Robert Guiscard, Norman adventurer
- 1119 – Baldwin VII, count of Flanders (born 1093)
- 1210 – Sverker II, king of Sweden (born before 1167)
- 1304 – Edmund Mortimer, 2nd Baron Mortimer (born 1251)
- 1399 – Jadwiga, queen of Poland (born 1374)
- 1453 – Dmitry Shemyaka, Grand Prince of Moscow
- 1453 – John Talbot, 1st Earl of Shrewsbury, English commander and politician (born 1387)
- 1531 – Hosokawa Takakuni, Japanese commander (born 1484)
- 1571 – Georg Fabricius, German poet and historian (born 1516)
- 1588 – Mimar Sinan, Ottoman architect and engineer, designed the Sokollu Mehmet Pasha Mosque and Süleymaniye Mosque (born 1489)

=== 1601–1900 ===
- 1603 – Mózes Székely, Hungarian noble (born 1553)
- 1642 – William, Count of Nassau-Siegen, German count, field marshal of the Dutch State Army (born 1592)
- 1645 – Robert Carr, 1st Earl of Somerset, English-Scottish politician, Lord Chamberlain of the United Kingdom (born 1587)
- 1704 – Pierre-Charles Le Sueur, French fur trader and explorer (born 1657)
- 1709 – Robert Bolling, English planter and merchant (born 1646)
- 1725 – Thomas King, English and British soldier, MP for Queenborough, lieutenant-governor of Sheerness (born before 1660?).
- 1762 – Peter III of Russia (born 1728)
- 1790 – Adam Smith, Scottish economist and philosopher (born 1723)
- 1791 – Martin Dobrizhoffer, Austrian missionary and author (born 1717)
- 1793 – Charlotte Corday, French murderer (born 1768)
- 1794 – John Roebuck, English chemist and businessman (born 1718)
- 1845 – Charles Grey, 2nd Earl Grey, English politician, Prime Minister of the United Kingdom (born 1764)
- 1871 – Karl Tausig, Polish virtuoso pianist, arranger and composer (born 1841)
- 1878 – Aleardo Aleardi, Italian poet and politician (born 1812)
- 1879 – Maurycy Gottlieb, Ukrainian-Polish painter (born 1856)
- 1881 – Jim Bridger, American scout and explorer (born 1804)
- 1883 – Tự Đức, Vietnamese emperor (born 1829)
- 1885 – Jean-Charles Chapais, Canadian farmer and politician, 1st Canadian Minister of Agriculture (born 1811)
- 1894 – Leconte de Lisle, French poet and translator (born 1818)
- 1894 – Josef Hyrtl, Austrian anatomist and biologist (born 1810)
- 1900 – Thomas McIlwraith, Scottish-Australian politician, 8th Premier of Queensland (born 1835)

=== 1901–present ===
- 1907 – Hector Malot, French author and critic (born 1830)
- 1912 – Henri Poincaré, French mathematician, physicist, and engineer (born 1854)
- 1918 – Victims of the Shooting of the Romanov family:
  - Nicholas II of Russia (born 1868)
  - Alexandra Fyodorovna of Russia (born 1872)
  - Grand Duchess Olga Nikolaevna of Russia (born 1895)
  - Grand Duchess Tatiana Nikolaevna of Russia (born 1897)
  - Grand Duchess Maria Nikolaevna of Russia (born 1899)
  - Grand Duchess Anastasia Nikolaevna of Russia (born 1901)
  - Alexei Nikolaevich, Tsarevich of Russia (born 1904)
  - Anna Demidova (born 1878)
  - Ivan Kharitonov (born 1872)
  - Alexei Trupp (born 1858)
  - Yevgeny Botkin (born 1865)
- 1925 – Lovis Corinth, German painter (born 1858)
- 1928 – Giovanni Giolitti, Italian politician, 13th Prime Minister of Italy (born 1842)
- 1928 – Álvaro Obregón, Mexican general and politician, 39th President of Mexico (born 1880)
- 1932 – Rasmus Rasmussen, Norwegian actor, singer, and director (born 1862)
- 1935 – George William Russell, Irish poet and painter (born 1867)
- 1942 – Robina Nicol, New Zealand photographer and suffragist (born 1861)
- 1944 – William James Sidis, American mathematician and anthropologist (born 1898)
- 1945 – Ernst Busch, German field marshal (born 1885)
- 1946 – Florence Fuller, South African-born Australian artist (born 1867)
- 1946 – Dragoljub Mihailović, Serbian and Yugoslav general, leader of the Yugoslav army in the fatherland (born 1893)
- 1950 – Evangeline Booth, English 4th General of The Salvation Army (born 1865)
- 1950 – Antonie Nedošinská, Czech actress (born 1885)
- 1959 – Billie Holiday, American singer (born 1915)
- 1959 – Eugene Meyer, American businessman and publisher (born 1875)
- 1960 – Maud Menten, Canadian physician and biochemist (born 1879)
- 1961 – Ty Cobb, American baseball player and manager (born 1886)
- 1961 – Emin Halid Onat, Turkish architect and academic (born 1908)
- 1967 – John Coltrane, American saxophonist and composer (born 1926)
- 1974 – Dizzy Dean, American baseball player and sportscaster (born 1910)
- 1975 – Konstantine Gamsakhurdia, Georgian author (born 1893)
- 1980 – Don "Red" Barry, American actor and screenwriter (born 1912)
- 1980 – Boris Delaunay, Russian mathematician and academic (born 1890)
- 1988 – Bruiser Brody, American football player and wrestler (born 1946)
- 1989 – Itubwa Amram, Nauruan pastor and politician (born 1922)
- 1994 – Jean Borotra, French tennis player (born 1898)
- 1994 – Paul Tiulana, Iñupiat artist and dancer (born 1921)
- 1995 – Juan Manuel Fangio, Argentinian race car driver (born 1911)
- 1996 – Chas Chandler, English bass player and producer (born 1938)
- 1998 – Lillian Hoban, American author and illustrator (born 1925)
- 2001 – Katharine Graham, American publisher (born 1917)
- 2002 – Joseph Luns, Dutch politician and Dutch Minister of Foreign Affairs (born 1911)
- 2003 – David Kelly, Welsh weapons inspector (born 1944)
- 2003 – Rosalyn Tureck, American pianist and harpsichord player (born 1914)
- 2003 – Walter Zapp, Latvian-Swiss inventor, invented the Minox (born 1905)
- 2005 – Geraldine Fitzgerald, Irish-American actress (born 1913)
- 2005 – Edward Heath, English colonel and politician, Prime Minister of the United Kingdom (born 1916)
- 2006 – Mickey Spillane, American crime novelist (born 1918)
- 2007 – Júlio Redecker, Brazilian politician (born 1956)
- 2009 – Walter Cronkite, American journalist and actor (born 1916)
- 2009 – Leszek Kołakowski, Polish historian and philosopher (born 1927)
- 2011 – David Ngoombujarra, Australian actor (born 1967)
- 2011 – Taiji Sawada, Japanese musician (born 1966)
- 2012 – İlhan Mimaroğlu, Turkish-American composer and producer (born 1926)
- 2012 – Marsha Singh, Indian-English politician (born 1954)
- 2013 – Henri Alleg, English-French journalist and author (born 1921)
- 2013 – Vincenzo Cerami, Italian screenwriter and producer (born 1940)
- 2013 – David White, Scottish footballer and manager (born 1933)
- 2014 – Malaysia Airlines Flight 17 victims:
  - Liam Davison, Australian author and critic (born 1957)
  - Shuba Jay, Malaysian actress (born 1976)
  - Joep Lange, Dutch physician and academic (born 1954)
  - Willem Witteveen, Dutch scholar and politician (born 1952)
- 2014 – Henry Hartsfield, American colonel, pilot, and astronaut (born 1933)
- 2014 – Otto Piene, German sculptor and academic (born 1928)
- 2014 – Elaine Stritch, American actress and singer (born 1925)
- 2015 – Jules Bianchi, French racing driver (born 1989)
- 2015 – Owen Chadwick, English rugby player, historian, and academic (born 1916)
- 2019 – Marie Sophie Hingst, German historian and blogger who falsely claimed to be descended from Holocaust survivors
- 2020 – John Lewis, American civil rights activist and politician (born 1940)
- 2020 – Ekaterina Alexandrovskaya, Russian-Australian pair skater (born 2000)
- 2024 – Cheng Pei-pei, Chinese actress (born 1946)
- 2024 – Mary Gibby, British botanist and professor (born 1949)
- 2024 – Bernice Johnson Reagon, American singer, songwriter and scholar (born 1942)
- 2024 – Pat Williams, American basketball player (born 1940)
- 2025 – Felix Baumgartner, Austrian daredevil (born 1969)
- 2025 – Alan Bergman, American songwriter (born 1925)
- 2025 – Joanna Kołaczkowska, Polish cabaret performer (born 1966)

== Holidays and observances ==
- Christian feast day:
  - Alexius of Rome (Western Church)
  - Andrew Zorard
  - Cynehelm
  - Cynllo
  - Inácio de Azevedo
  - Jadwiga of Poland
  - Magnus Felix Ennodius
  - Marcellina
  - Martyrs of Compiègne
  - Blessed Pavel Peter Gojdič (Greek Catholic Church)
  - Pope Leo IV
  - Romanov sainthood (Russian Orthodox Church)
  - Speratus and companions
  - William White (Episcopal Church)
  - July 17 (Eastern Orthodox liturgics)
- Constitution Day (South Korea)
- Gion Matsuri (Yasaka Shrine, Kyoto)
- Independence Day (Slovakia)
- International Firgun Day (International)
- King's Birthday (Lesotho)
- U Tirot Sing Day (Meghalaya, India)
- World Day for International Justice (International)
- World Emoji Day (International)
