= Rupert Atkinson =

Rupert Atkinson may refer to:

- Rupert Atkinson (poet) (1881–1961), Australian poet
- Rupert Atkinson (RAF officer) (1896–1919), British World War I flying ace
