= Double Sixth Festival =

Chinese traditional festival

- Celebrating the Double Sixth Festival
- Official name: Double Sixth Festival (六月六) Tian Kuang Jie (天贶节); Gu Gu Jie (姑姑节); Chong Wang Jie (虫王节); Qing Miao Jie (青苗节); Shai Yi Jie (晒衣节) Hua Er Hui (花儿会)
- Observed by: Chinese
- Type: Chinese Festival
- Observances: Varies in ethnicities
- Date: 6th day of the 6th month of the Chinese calendar

Double Sixth Festival
- Traditional Chinese: 天貺節
- Simplified Chinese: 天贶节
- Literal meaning: "The reward from heaven"
Transcriptions
Standard Mandarin
- Hanyu Pinyin: Tian Kuang Jie

The Double Sixth Festival (Chinese: 六月六) is a Chinese traditional festival, the annual festival takes place on the sixth day of the sixth month of the Chinese calendar. The festival has different names among different areas in China and varies in practices within Chinese ethnic groups. The most recognized official name is Tiankuang Festival (天贶节) announced by Emperor Zhenzong of the Song dynasty, meaning the gift or reward from heaven. The most well-known custom is to bring all outfits, and books out and put them under the sunlight, people believe that doing this would not only prevent things becoming mildewed or damaged by worms but also brings fortune to themselves. The old saying from the Ming dynasty in China classifies this behavior observed in different social classes: "At June 6, scholars will dry their books in sun, women will dry their clothes in sun and farmers will pray for their harvest." The festival has lost some of its significance in China because of changes in social structure and reasons like farming technology improvement.

== Origin ==
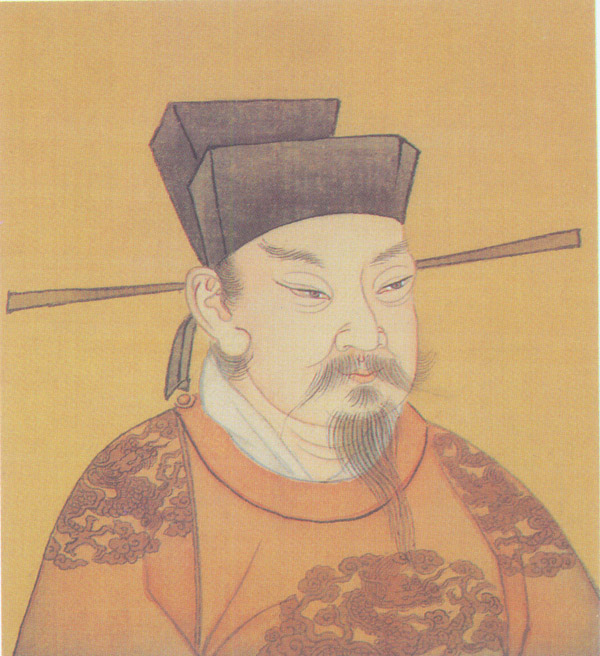
Song Zhenzong's portrait

The origin of this festival follows with the Qin Dynasty, the first unification of China, after the first emperor Qin Shi Huang went to Mount Tai to offer the ritual of sacrifice to heaven. Other records of the Double Sixth festival were found in the Song Dynasty in China. The emperor Zhao Heng (Song Zhen Zong) announced "Tian Kuang" to be the official name for the Double Sixth festival. He claimed he had Heaven's blessing that he received scriptures from heaven which showed "a wise ruler, an enlightened emperor could govern the country and bring peace to everyone", the emperor then set the day he received this sacred revelation to be a holiday that everyone should celebrate it. The emperor Zhao Heng then reconstructed the Dai Temple on Mount Tai, which is the central religious construct of Taoism and the main place to show emperor's authority and relation to heaven. The emperor Zhao Heng then renamed the central building in Dai Temple as Tian Kuang Hall. Buddhists hold a different claim that this festival was originated with the legend of Xuan Zang in the Tang Dynasty, the sea water dampened some volumes of scriptures he brought back from India, and he had to dry these holy scriptures in sun. people then believed that by following Xuan Zang, putting things under the sunlight can receive blessing from heaven.

== Observance ==
=== Han People ===
==== The name of Double Sixth festival in Han Chinese culture ====
The Double Sixth festival is called "Gu Gu Jie 姑姑节" and "Tian Kuang Jie 天贶节" in Han people. The name "Gu Gu Jie 姑姑节" is composed of three Chinese characters, two identical Chinese characters "Gu Gu 姑姑" means female relative, and "Jie 节" means Festival. The name "Tian Kuang Jie天贶节" which composed by three characters: "Tian天" represents the sky, and heaven (the place where all spirits lives), "Kuang贶" stands for the gift or reward from heaven, "Jie节" means festival.

==== Mythology by Han People ====
Gu Gu Jie (姑姑节)

The legend falls in the Spring and Autumn period in China, an official in the country Jin called Hu Yan made a mistake which caused the death of his daughter's father-in-law, and his son-in-law wanted to kill him for revenge. Hu Yan's daughter struggled and told her father this plan. Hu Yan realized his mistake and wanted to correct his mistake later on. He does not blame his son-in-law for wanting to revenge, and he asked his daughter and son-in-law to have a family reunion on every June 6. The legend comes up with an old saying: "Get Gu Gu back to home at June 6 六月六，请姑姑."

Tian Kuang Jie (天贶节)

Details in the history part above.

==== Practices ====
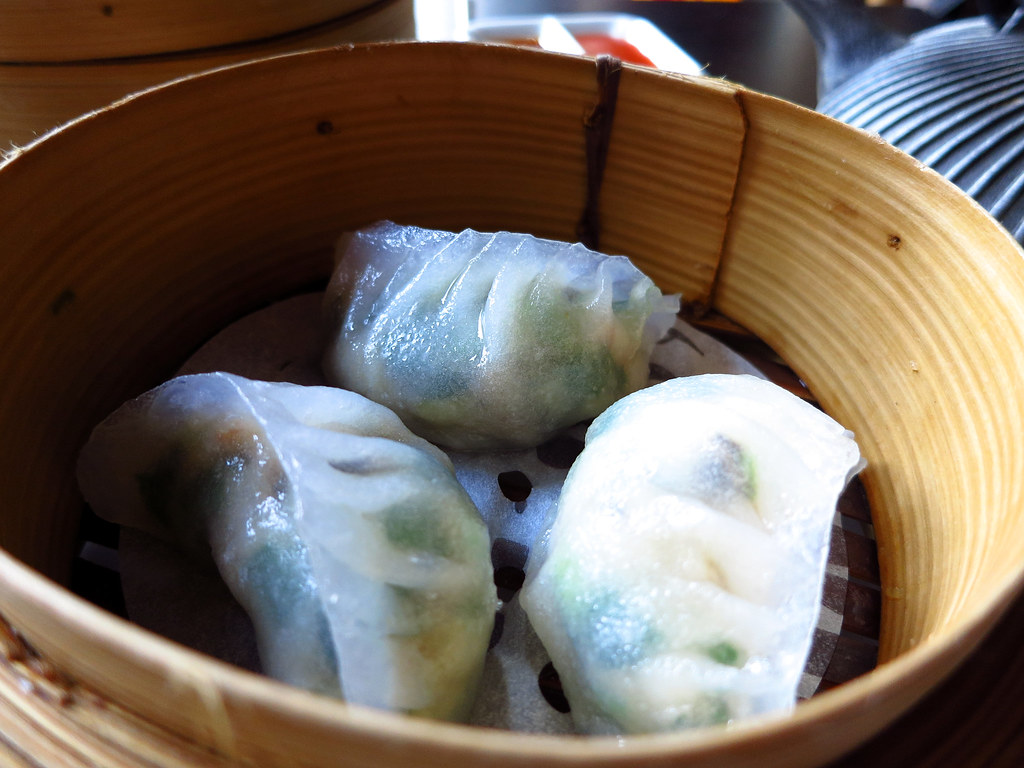
Dumplings made for the Double Sixth festival

On the day of the festival, Parents will invite their married daughter and their son in law back home to maintain the harmony and good relationship between them. The daughter would take their children with them to her parents' house and leave a mark on children's forehead when returning to frighten away the evil spirits and pray for good fortune.

On that day, people would eat wheat flour which is baked and mixed with hot water and flavored by sugar or salt. People believe that eating wheat flour on June 6 would cure diarrhea.

Women in Henan Province would cook dumplings that day, and they would sweep the ancestor's grave before come back home.

=== Man People ===
==== The name of Double Sixth festival in Man Chinese culture ====
The Double Sixth festival is called "Chong Wang Jie 虫王节" in Man people. The name "Chong Wang Jie 虫王节" is composed of three Chinese Characters: "Chong 虫" means worms, "Wang 王" means the king, and "Jie 节" means the festival. The literal meaning of "Chong Wang Jie 虫王节" is the festival of the king of worms.

==== Mythology by Man People ====
Man people believe that there exists the king of worms, if people offer sacrifices on June 6, the king of worms will keep all worms away from their seedlings.

==== Practices ====
To protect their crops from worms, Man people gathered round to the local Chong Wang temple to celebrate this festival, offer food and live stocks to the king of worms, pray for a good harvest. The temple would give white flags to people who have offered sacrifice, and let them put the flags on the side of their farmland. People believe by doing so, the King of worms would recognize them and keep worms away from the flagged farmland.

=== Bai People ===
==== The name of Double Sixth festival in Bai Chinese culture ====
The Double Sixth festival is called "Qing Miao Jie 青苗节" in Bai people. The name "Qing Miao Jie 青苗节" is composed of three Chinese characters: "Qing青" means the color green, "Miao苗" means the seedling and "jie节" means the festival. The literal meaning for "Qing Miao Jie 青苗节" means the festival of green seedlings.

==== Mythology by Bai People ====
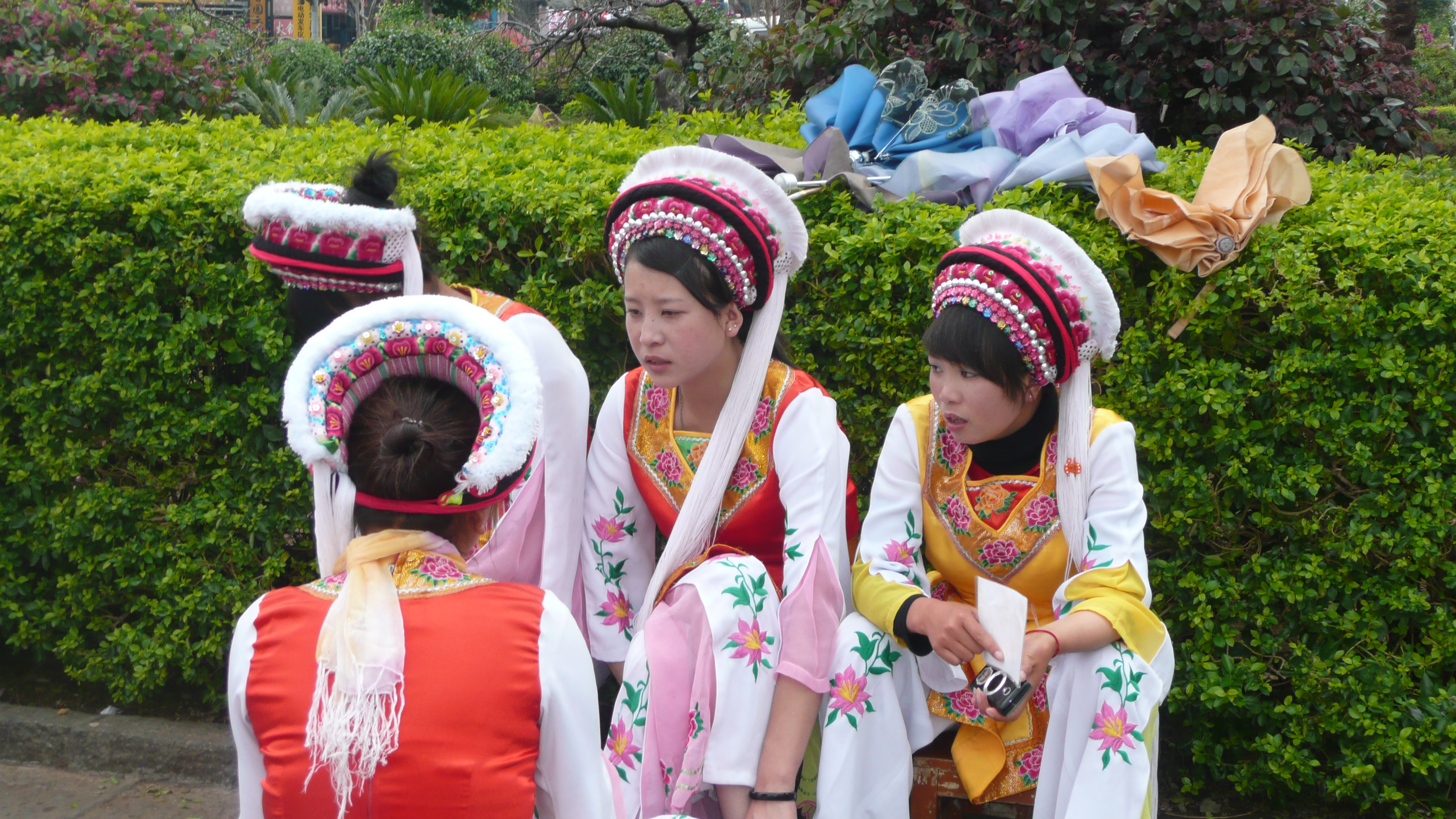
Bai People in China wearing the traditional outfits

Bai people believe in the legend of a spirit called "Qing Miao Tai Zi 青苗太子" who is the prince of the seeding. The spirit has the ability to control all processes of seeding, and the celebration can make the spirit happy and would give bless with the harvest.

==== Practices ====
Bai people usually celebrate this festival in the local "Wu Gu Miao 五谷庙", which is the temple of grains. Each village would offer a pig to "Qing Miao Tai Zi", and the temple would give a flag to each family, they have to plug the flag on the side of their farm land to ensure that their land is under the blessing from "Qing Miao Tai Zi".

=== Yao, Tujia, and Buyi People ===
==== The name of Double Sixth festival in those Chinese ethnicities’ culture ====
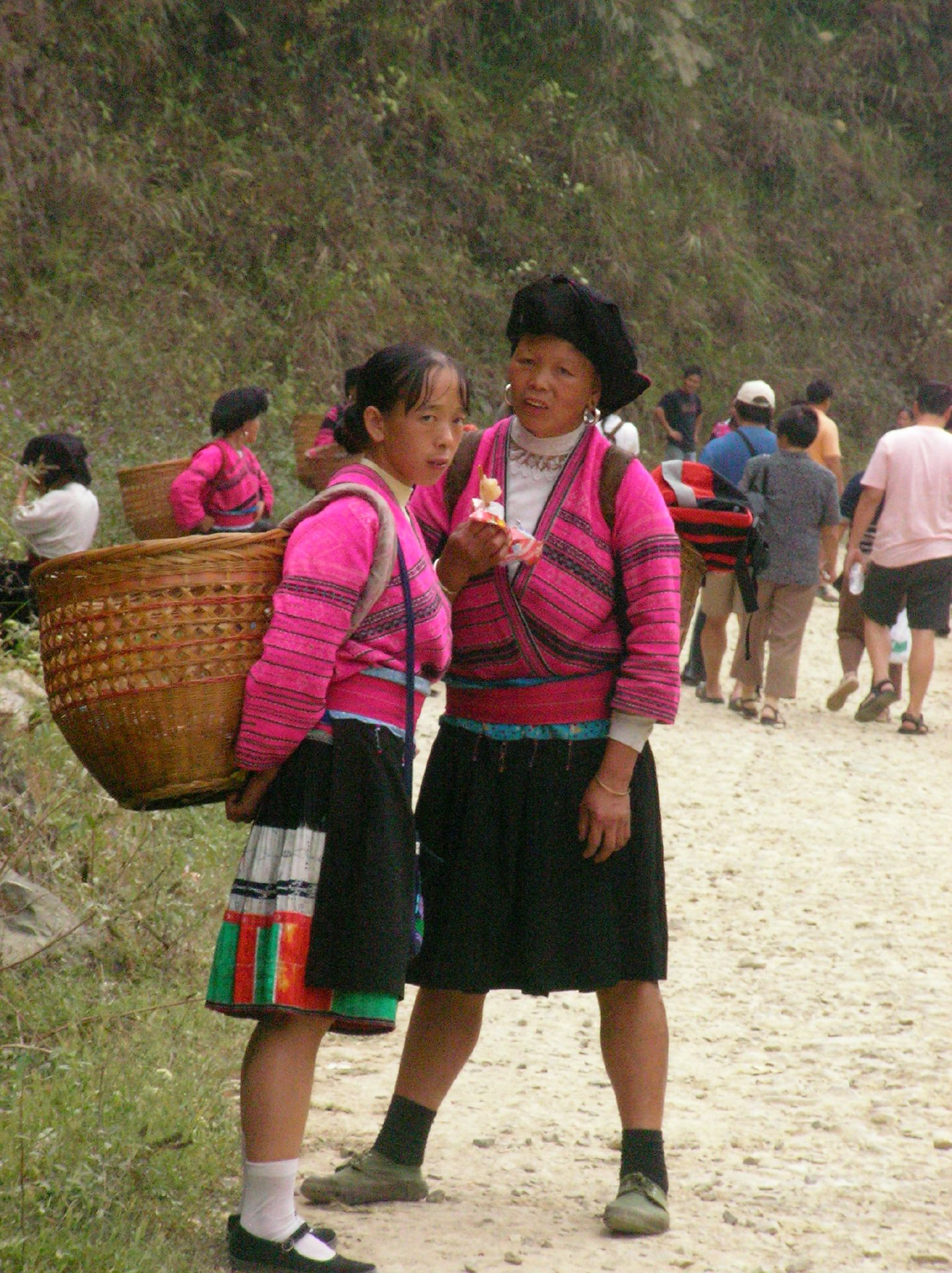
Yao People in China waiting for sunset

The Double Sixth festival is called "Shai Yi Jie 晒衣节" in Yao, Tujia and Buyi people. The name "Shai Yi Jie" is composed of three Chinese characters: "Shai晒" means put something in sunlight, "Yi衣" means clothes and "Jie节" means the festival. The literal meaning of "Shai Yi Jie" is the festival to put clothes in sunlight.

==== Mythology by People ====
The legend by Yao, Tujia and Buyi people says that the sunlight during 6 June has the magical power, that would prevent clothes and books damaged by worms or get mildewed, and would also help people to avoid evil spirits.

==== Practices ====
Yao and Tujia People would have to prepare food before the festival, and they would eat chickens and ducks during the day of the festival. People would get up before the sun rises, and young people would listen to elder's orders to take outfits, books, decorations out of their house and put them on the ground or put them up on bamboo pole dryers. They would organize those stuff back to the original place at 3 to 4 P.M. When the sun goes down, every family would stand at the ground and wave to the sun to show respect and appreciation to the sun. After that, families would enjoy a groaning board.

Buyi people would have to make rice cakes and traditional food ZongJi for the festival. At the day of festival, people would gather around and drink self made alcohol together while play local musical instruments to commemorate their ancestors.

=== Hui, Tu, Miao, Baoan, Sala, Dongxiang, and Yugu People ===
==== The name of Double Sixth festival in those Chinese ethnicities’ culture ====
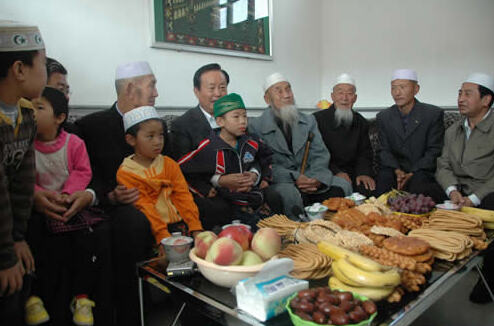
Hui Family reunion for annal celebration

The Double Sixth Festival is called "Hua Er Hui 花儿会" in Hui, Tu, Miao, Baoan, Sala, Dongxiang, and Yugu People. The name is composed of three Chinese characters: "Hua花"& "Er儿" means flowers, "Hui会" means fair. The literal meaning of "Hua Er Hui花儿会" is the flower fair but the actual meaning is the songfest about flowers.

==== Mythology by People ====
Tu People believe that in the old days there were a couple that would sing beautiful songs about flowers. The powerful officials imprisoned the man in the couple and ordered him to sing until his voice broke. The woman cried for her lover and her tears became a magic spring, they used it to cure the man's eye. The magic spring helped a lot of people and they gathered to sing songs and show their appreciation about the spring each 6 June.

Miao People believed that there once was a brutal emperor who puts a heavy tax on people and forced people to work day and night for him, a young man named "Fu Lou Mei" decided to kill the emperor for his family and friends. In order to kill the emperor, he practiced archery and planned to take action on June 6. But he failed at that assassination and was captured then killed by soldiers. Miao People then decided to set that day as a Memorial Day and hold a songfest for him each year.

There is no exact record that can be tracked of legend by Hui & Baoan & Sala & Dongxiang & Yugu People about the Double Sixth festival.

==== Practices ====
People would hold a songfest for four to five days, they would wear the formal ethnic clothe and exchange songs about flowers, love and historical events. Start with solos, and then two people sing together, and all people join in. After that, there would be a singing competition. Young people would use this songfest as an opportunity to make friends or express love to others through singing.

== Construct Related with the Double Sixth Festival ==
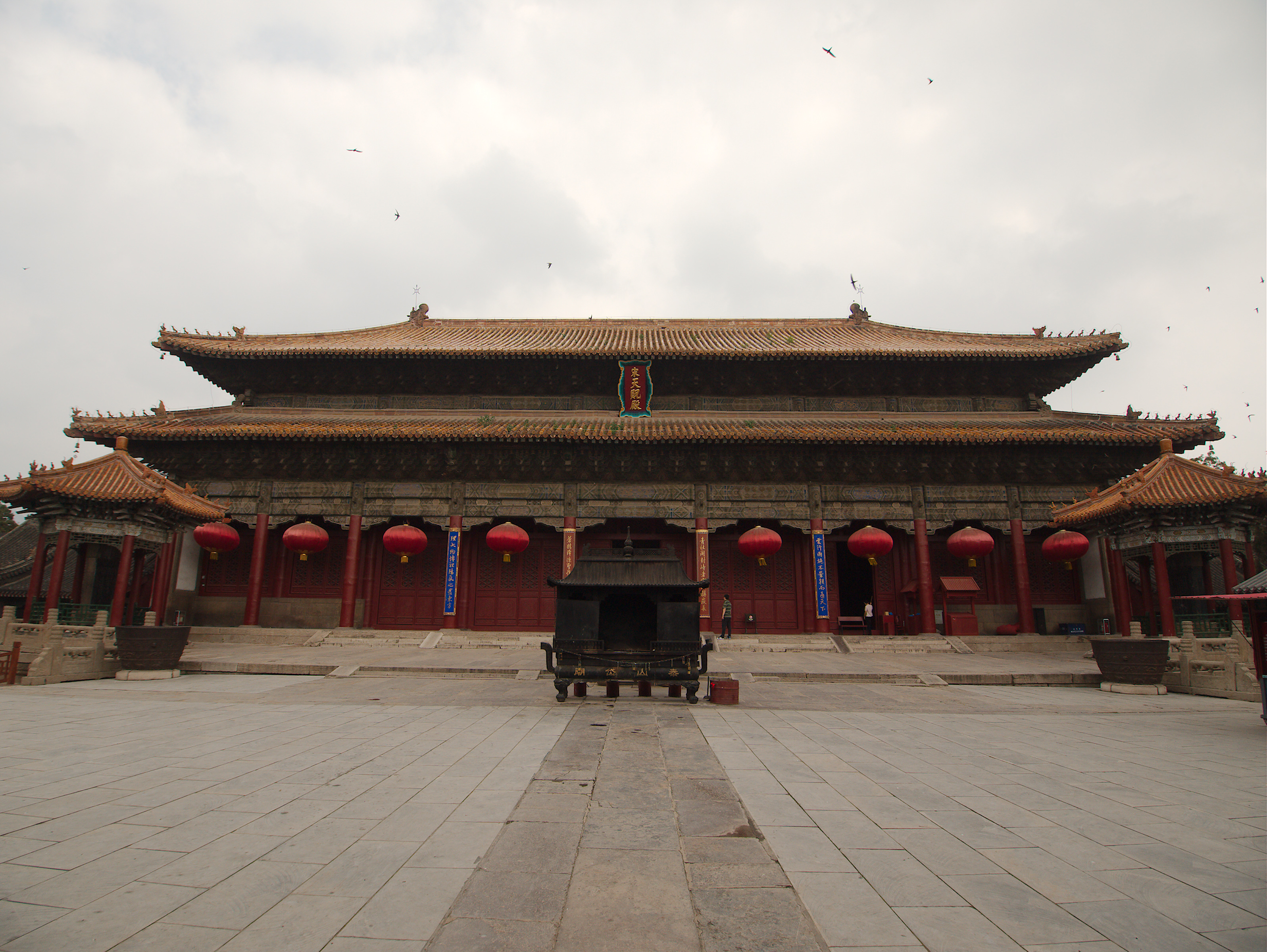
Tian Kuang Hall in Dai Temple for the Double Sixth Festival

The idea of "Tian Kuang Jie" was originated after Qin Shi Huang, the first emperor of China, went to Mount Tai to offer sacrifice to Heaven and announce the relation between the emperor and heaven. The Dai Temple was built as the site of this ritual. The ritual itself became compulsory for every emperor of succeeding dynasties, and by offering sacrifice to heaven on Dai Temple, emperors are emphasizing their special relation with heaven— "the self-assumed son of heaven." In the Song dynasty, emperor Zhao Heng claimed that he received scriptures from heaven at June 6, and he reconstructed Dai Temple and renamed the main hall as Tian Kuang Hall to prove his religious and appreciation to heaven. The temple was further renovated and expanded by all Zhao Heng's offsprings and emperors in succeeding dynasties.
