= Naval Reserve Officers Training Corps =

US military officer training program

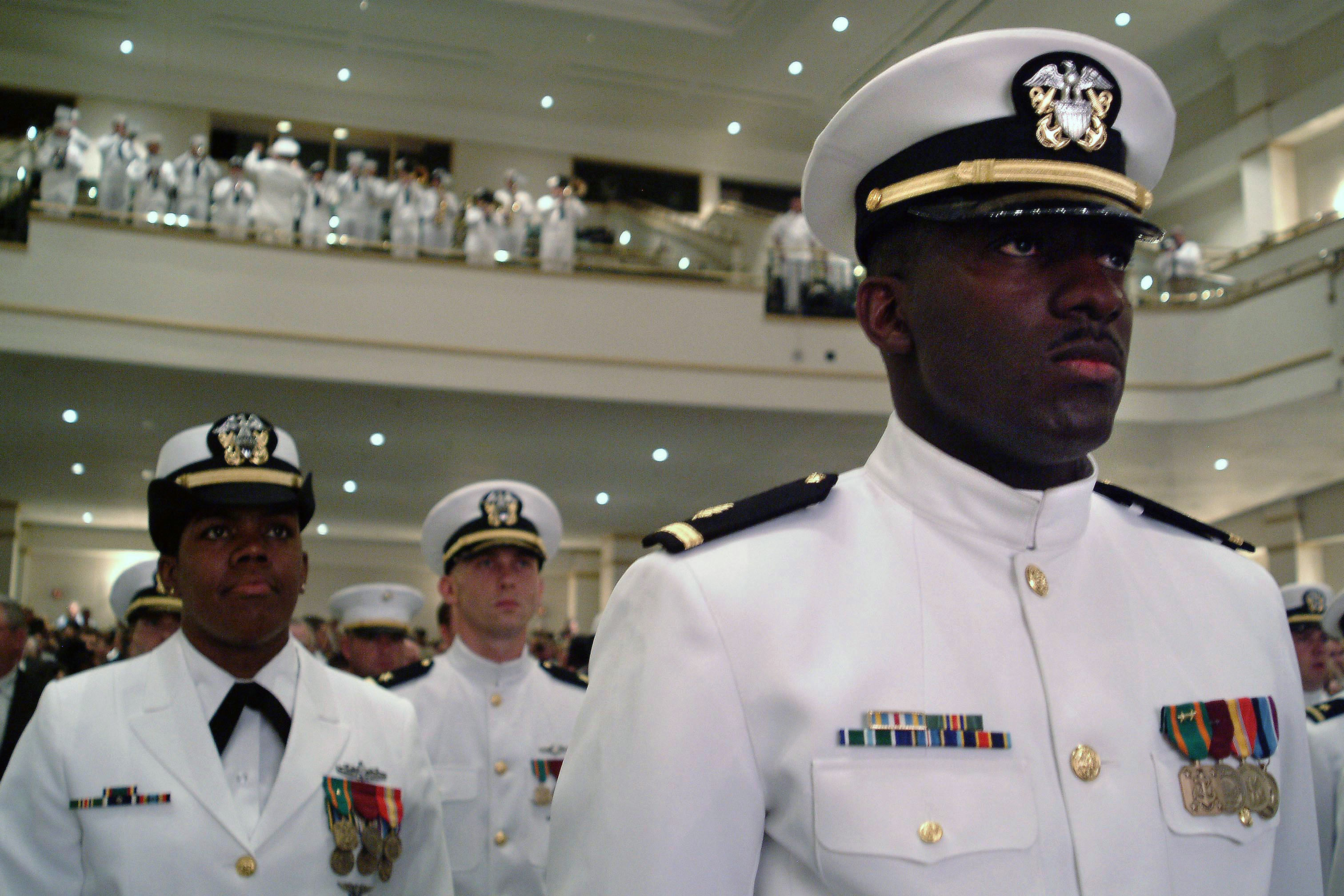
NROTC Midshipmen being commissioned in May 2004.

The Naval Reserve Officers Training Corps (NROTC) program is a college-based, commissioned officer training program of the United States Navy and the United States Marine Corps.

== Origins ==
A pilot Naval Reserve unit was established in September 1924 at St. John's College in Annapolis, Maryland. It let the Navy test the concept before establishing its regular units. In 1926, the U.S. Department of the Navy established the Naval Reserve Officer Training Corps. Its purpose was to produce a reserve of qualified officers who would be needed for a possible rapid expansion of the military in the case of an unforeseen emergency. A secondary objective was to acquaint college faculty and students with the Navy and its national importance. Sixty Naval Reserve Freshmen were accepted at each of the original units at the University of California, Berkeley, Northwestern University, University of Washington, Harvard University, Yale University, and Georgia Institute of Technology. Captain Chester W. Nimitz commanded the University of California NROTC unit. The first NROTC students received one uniform and (during their junior and senior years) a subsistence allowance totaling $210. They had the option of attending a fifteen-day training cruise each summer for which they would be paid seventy cents per day and a transportation allowance between their college and the ports of embarkation and debarkation. The St. John's College pilot unit disbanded by 1929, but the original six regular units are still active in 2014 (albeit with historical gaps at Harvard and Yale).

== Modern system ==
Under the modern U.S. Naval ROTC system, graduates become active duty officers, rather than reserve officers, and are required to serve a term of 5 years for the Navy Option and 4 years for the Marine and Nurse Options. The Naval Reserve Officer Training Corps commissions individuals into either the United States Navy as an ensign or the United States Marine Corps as a second lieutenant. While attending college, these prospective officer candidates are known as Midshipmen. Whereas Naval Academy Midshipmen are on active duty, NROTC Midshipmen are in the Navy Reserve but are on active duty for periods of training during the summer. The primary difference is that NROTC Midshipmen attend an ordinary civilian college or university, whereas Naval Academy Midshipmen attend the U.S. Naval Academy in Annapolis, MD, which is a much more regimented, military environment.

Starting in 2009, the scholarship program was changed to favor STEM degrees at the expense of the humanities. Each military service is permitted by law to grant scholarships to 5,500 midshipmen or cadets at a time. The US Navy maintains about 6,000 midshipmen at any given time, with the remainder competing for scholarships.

== Joining the program ==
The majority of NROTC Midshipmen join the program immediately after completing high school. Those Midshipmen are either Scholarship or College Program Midshipmen.

Scholarship Midshipmen are those who applied to the Navy for an ROTC scholarship (during their senior year of high school, or during early college studies). Some NROTC students have served as enlisted men or women in the Navy or Marine Corps. The highly selective application process involves an extensive written application and an interview with a Navy representative. Applicants must also pass an entrance medical examination process. The Navy pays tuition for Scholarship Midshipmen, educational fees (i.e. lab fees), as well as a stipend for books. All Midshipmen fall under one of three types: Navy Option, Navy Nurse Option, or Marine Option. The Navy does not pay for room and board; however, some schools will offer scholarships to cover at least a portion of room and board. In addition to tuition, the Navy pays a monthly stipend during the school year. As of 2020, the stipend was $250 per month for first-year Midshipmen, with a $50 increase each year after that (i.e. $300/month for sophomores, and so on).

College Program Midshipmen are those who join Naval ROTC without a scholarship. They complete all activities and requirements of scholarship midshipmen and if they continue in the program for four years will also be commissioned as Ensigns or Second Lieutenants. They will often be offered a scholarship by the Navy if they perform well academically and within the ROTC program. Because of the technical nature of the Navy, students entering college without a 4-year scholarship who are planning to major in a technical field, such as engineering, science, or math, are more competitive for the scholarships.

NROTC designates all college majors into a 3-tier system, putting the advanced engineering majors in the Tier-1 category, most other majors into Tier-2, and majors with simpler degree completion requirements into the Tier-3 section. Applicants in Tier-1 and 2 majors are more competitive for obtaining scholarships versus those in Tier-3. Due to the extra difficulty of some STEM majors such as mechanical engineering, it is possible for some units to waive the 4-year graduation requirement and extend it by a year due to the extra work required.

Those enlisted in the Navy who are pursuing a commission through the Seaman to Admiral 21 (STA-21) participate in the ROTC program and are referred to as "Officer Candidates." They retain their enlisted pay.

Enlisted Marines participate in ROTC through the Marine Enlisted Commissioning Education Program (MECEP) and are referred to by their rank or by the name of the program, "MECEP." (pronounced mee-sep) MECEP Marines do not have their school paid for by the Marine Corps and generally use the Montgomery GI Bill or the Post-9/11 GI Bill to pay for school. They continue to receive pay in accordance with their rank, however any promotions while they are attending school are considered non-competitive and will be revoked if they fail out of the commissioning program.

== The program ==
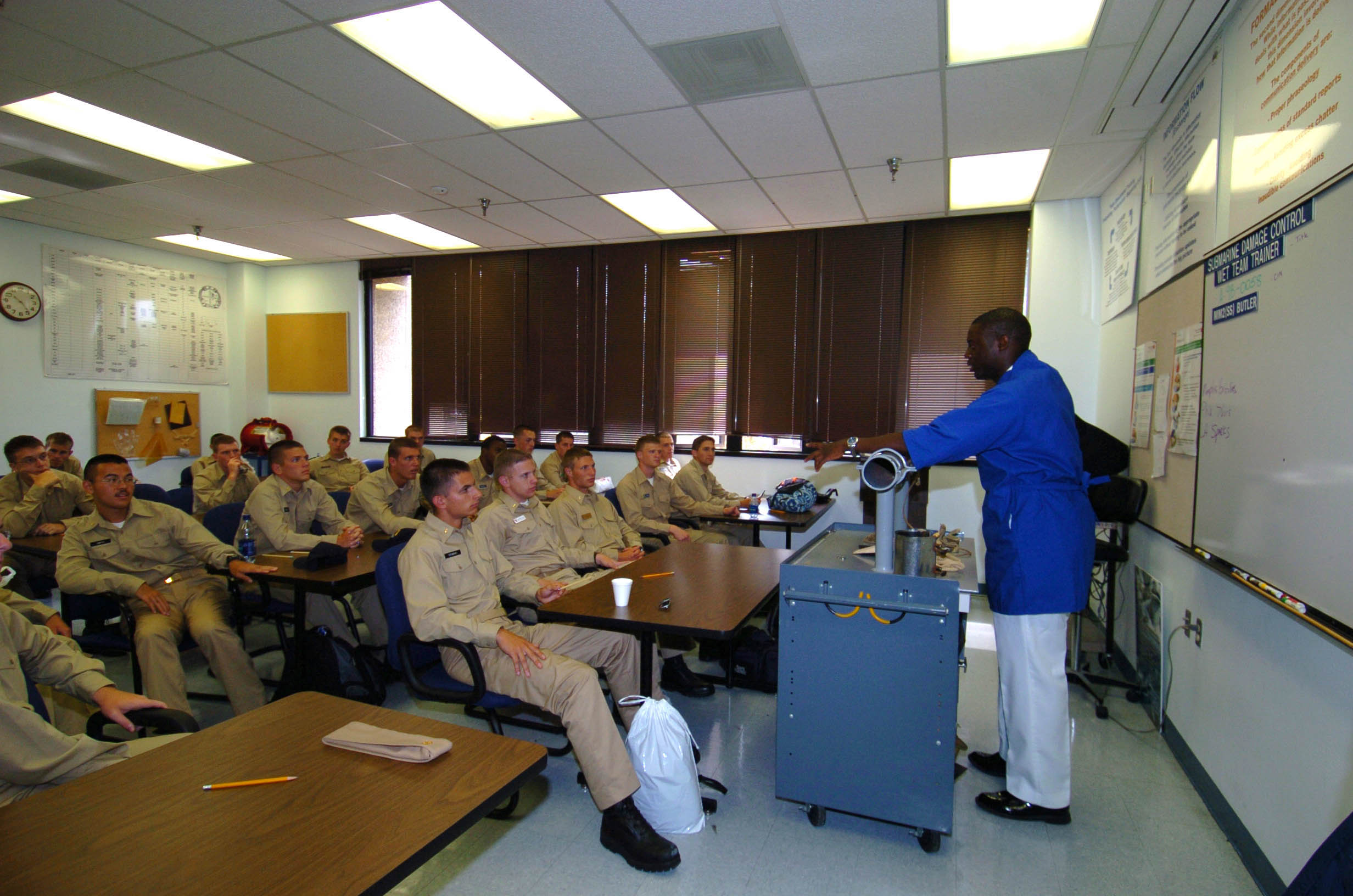
Navy NROTC Midshipmen in Naval Science Class

=== During the school year ===
Most college NROTC units are only a part-time commitment during a student's course of study at a university or college. There are three basic parts to a student's ROTC commitment in a typical week:

One or, in some cases, two days a week are set aside as uniform days, where the midshipmen spend several hours attending military training such as inspections, close-order drill practices, and training lectures (either by officers attached to the NROTC unit or guest lecturers). The training is usually in the late afternoon after most classes have ended for the day, or in early mornings before classes. It is common for Marine Option midshipmen and MECEPs to have an additional training period for Marine-specific training.

Usually one to three physical training sessions are required in a week (depending on the specific NROTC unit), generally early in the morning. It is common for Marine Option midshipmen and MECEPs to have additional physical training days.

During a normal school year, Navy ROTC midshipmen must take two official physical readiness tests (PRTs). The minimum requirements for the test are, for males, 47 push-ups without resting in 2 minutes, holding a plank position for at least 1 minute and 40 seconds without rest, and no slower than a 12-minute 1.5-mile run; for females, at least 21 push-ups, a 1 minute, 30 second plank, and a 1.5-mile run in 14 minutes, 15 seconds. All midshipmen are subject to the age 20–24 PRT standards, regardless of actual age. Midshipmen are encouraged to score as high as possible during the tests to increase their scores relative to each other. If midshipmen fail to complete the minimum requirements for the PRT, they are automatically enrolled in the fitness enhancement program (FEP), requiring that they conduct extra physical training with the unit outside normal hours. There are several "inventory" PRTs throughout the semester that are identical to an official PRT, but the scores are not recorded on fitness reports; their purpose is to check progress.

In addition to those activities, there are regularly scheduled classes in Naval Science that must be taken on top of the usual college load. The classes are in Naval history, Naval engineering and weapons, leadership and ethics, and other areas. Besides Naval Science classes, the Navy requires its Midshipmen to complete 2 semesters of calculus, 2 semesters of calculus-based physics, one semester diverse cultures, one year of English grammar and composition, and either National Security Policy or American Military Affairs. The Marine Corps only requires National Security Policy/American Military Affairs classes for its midshipmen.

There are other miscellaneous activities scheduled occasionally; some are voluntary and some are mandatory.

==== Military colleges ====
There are a few ROTC programs that do not follow this model, and instead require a full-time commitment from midshipmen during the school year. At a Senior Military College, the midshipmen are normally housed together with other ROTC cadets in barrack-like dormitories, a uniform is worn at least 5 days a week, and regular morning and evening formations are mandatory. At The Citadel and the Virginia Military Institute, cadets wear uniforms 7 days a week, live in a barracks, and are restricted to campus during the school week to focus on their studies and military training. Such full-time programs provide a more regimented existence that more closely simulates enlisted military life; they tend to be more demanding than normal college ROTC programs, requiring additional commitments of time, physical and mental energy, and the like, above and beyond most normal ROTC programs. Some midshipmen are drawn to these programs, which have a rich historical tradition behind them. Other students prefer standard NROTC programs, which allow them to focus more of their energy on academics rather than being limited by a regimented military life.

Some notable full-time programs include the Corps of Cadets at The Citadel, Virginia Military Institute, Virginia Tech, Massachusetts Maritime Academy, Texas A&M University, Texas A&M Maritime Academy, SUNY Maritime College, Maine Maritime Academy, California Maritime Academy and Norwich University.

=== During the summer ===
NROTC students who are on scholarship participate in a summer cruise in the fleet, to get hands-on training with real Navy personnel and equipment. After their freshman year, Midshipmen (both Navy and Marine) travel to either San Diego or Norfolk for CORTRAMID (Career Orientation and Training of Midshipmen). The Midshipmen spend a week in each of the three primary Unrestricted Line communities (Surface, Submarine, and Aviation) as well as a week with the Marine Corps to help them decide which community to join when commissioned.

In the next two summers, Navy Option scholarship midshipmen spend time with either a surface ship, submarine, or aviation squadron. Aviation cruises are only available to Midshipmen for their First Class Cruise. For each summer cruise, they select which warfare community they would prefer to train with and are given the opportunity to train around the world. The summer cruise in between the sophomore and junior years is referred to as the second-class cruise. They are assigned an enlisted running mate, from whom they acquire a sense of the enlisted experience. The summer cruise in between the junior and senior years of college (known as the First Class Cruise) is required for commissioning, and it focuses on integrating the midshipman into the officer community. Specialty cruises include EOD cruises, SEAL cruises, FOREX cruises (midshipmen are attached to a foreign country's ship), and Navy Nurse Cruises.

Marine Option Midshipmen attend the Marine Corps' Mountain Warfare Training Center for the second summer. In recent years they have been attached to Marine units undergoing the summer training package. They learn high altitude survival techniques and undergo high altitude conditioning. It is often jokingly called "OCS prep." Between the junior and senior years, Marine Option midshipmen attend "Bulldog," Marine Officer Candidate School for six weeks.

College Program midshipmen must either obtain the scholarship before their junior year or receive "advanced standing". In either case the midshipmen will only attend the first class summer cruise or OCS for Marine Options.

=== Uniforms of midshipmen ===
NROTC students are generally issued several types of uniforms, all for them to keep. The standard issue uniform is the poly/wool khaki, while Summer White and Service Dress Blue (commonly known as SDBs) are often seen on college campuses. Midshipmen wear a garrison cover with a fouled anchor for the Khakis, and a combination cover with a fouled anchor and a gold strap with the Whites and SDBs. Also newly issued to Midshipmen are the Navy's NWU type III working uniform. Finally, Midshipmen are issued coveralls for preparation for their cruise, as well as an "N" ballcap and steel toed boots.

== Commitment ==
The normal, "baseline" service commitment for Scholarship NROTC graduates is eight years, with no less than five served on active duty. The exact commitment will depend on which warfare community a midshipman is selected for. For example, Navy and Marine pilots are generally committed to eight years after their date of winging. Because the training for a Naval Aviator is extensive, this can lead to a commitment of up to 10 years. Naval Flight Officers usually serve a six-year commitment and Submarine Officers usually serve a five-year commitment.

Commitment is also based on whether a midshipman is enrolled in the scholarship or college program. Those midshipmen who are in the college program typically only owe three years of active duty service.

Once a naval officer completes their active duty commitment, they must serve the rest of their three years in some portion of the Navy Reserve.

== See also ==
- Army Reserve Officers' Training Corps
- Early Commissioning Program
- Air Force Reserve Officer Training Corps
- Navy Officer Candidate School
- Marine Corps Officer Candidate School
- Army University
- Naval and Marine Corps Reserve Center Los Angeles
- USMC R4Q NROTC crash
- University Royal Naval Unit, (the United Kingdom equivalent)
- United States Coast Guard Auxiliary University Program
