= USMC R4Q NROTC crash =

1953 aviation incident in Florida, United States

Coordinates: 30.7505°N 87.0399°W

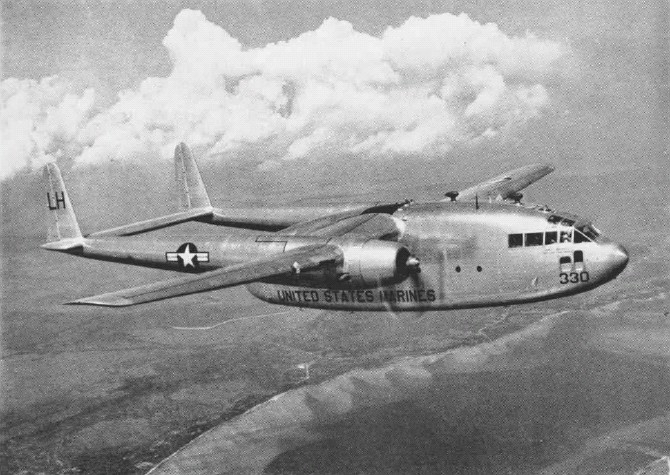
- A similar USMC R4Q Packet.

Accident
- Date: July 17, 1953
- Summary: crash following takeoff
- Site: Milton, Florida

Aircraft
- Aircraft type: Fairchild R4Q-2 Packet
- Operator: United States Marine Corps
- Registration: BuNo 131663
- Flight origin: NAS Corpus Christi
- Stopover: NAS Whiting Field
- Destination: NAS Norfolk
- Passengers: 40
- Crew: 6
- Fatalities: 43
- Injuries: 3
- Survivors: 3

USMC R4Q Packet BuNo 131663 was one of twenty aircraft airlifting 1,600 Naval Reserve Officer Training Corps (NROTC) second-class (2/c) midshipmen between summer aviation training in Texas and amphibious warfare training in Virginia in July 1953. Shortly after midnight, the plane crashed and burned following a refueling stop in Florida.

== Background ==
NROTC midshipmen attend civilian colleges during the fall and spring semesters, and spend part of the summer on active-duty training. The summer between their sophomore and junior years was dedicated to aviation and amphibious-warfare training. Half of the midshipmen started training with aviation and the other half started with amphibious-warfare training. After three weeks, a group of military transport aircraft airlifted the midshipmen to the other training location. Transport had been by train through 1952, and 1953 was the first summer during which midshipmen were airlifted between the training locations.

== Crash ==
On July 17 1953, 23 midshipmen from the University of Oklahoma, ten from Rice University, two from the University of Missouri, two from Oregon State University, one from the University of Oregon, one from the University of Utah, and one from the Georgia Institute of Technology were flying aboard United States Marine Corps R4Q Packet BuNo 131663 from Corpus Christi, Texas to Norfolk, Virginia. The plane was the second of five transports making a midnight refueling stop at NAS Whiting Field. The port engine lost power during initial climb following takeoff and the plane hit a clump of trees a mile north of the runway. The plane then destroyed three parked cars and a barn as it crashed and burned. Six injured men were found in the wreckage, but only two midshipmen and one of the 6-man USMC crew survived.

== Aftermath ==
The accident remains the greatest recorded loss of United States midshipmen in a single event. The crash was the 19th operational loss of a R4Q / C-119 type aircraft. At the time, it was the heaviest loss of life from an accident with that type of aircraft, but two subsequent accidents had higher fatalities. When it occurred, it ranked as the eleventh highest fatality count for an aircraft accident in the United States. Many of the Holloway Plan midshipmen were engineering students; and surviving midshipmen on other planes recalled one of those killed had completed an evaluation of the R4Q aircraft as an exercise and shared his conclusion that the aircraft could not maintain altitude if one engine failed during takeoff with a full load of fuel and cargo. Loss of most of the University of Oklahoma NROTC graduating class of 1955 severely disrupted the NROTC program at that school. Students from all NROTC schools were uniformly distributed among transport aircraft in subsequent summer training programs.

== See also ==
- List of accidents and incidents involving military aircraft (1950–1954) § 1953 (at "July 17")
