= Radical 142 =

Chinese character radical

虫
- Radical 142 (U+2F8D)
- 虫 (U+866B) "insect, worm"

Pronunciations
- Pinyin: hǔi, chóng
- Bopomofo: ㄏㄨㄟˇ, ㄔㄨㄥˊ
- Wade–Giles: hui3, ch'ung2
- Cantonese Yale: wai2, chung4
- Jyutping: wai2, cung4
- Japanese Kana: キ ki (on'yomi) むし mushi (kun'yomi)
- Sino-Korean: 훼 hwe
- Hán-Việt: trùng

Names
- Chinese name(s): (Left) 虫字旁 chóngzìpáng (Bottom) 虫字底 chóngzìdǐ
- Japanese name(s): 虫/むし mushi (Left) 虫偏/むしへん mushihen
- Hangul: 벌레 beolle

Stroke order animation

Radical 142 or radical insect (虫部) which means "insect" or "worm" is one of the 29 Kangxi radicals (214 radicals in total) composed of 6 strokes.

In the Kangxi Dictionary, there are 1067 characters (out of 49,030) to be found under this radical.

虫 is also the 131st indexing component in the Table of Indexing Chinese Character Components predominantly adopted by Simplified Chinese dictionaries published in mainland China.

The character 虫 models a worm. To derive from this, characters meaning creeping animals such as reptiles, insects, worms, amphibians, and shellfish are included in this radical. The character 虫 is used as the simplified form of 蟲 in Simplified Chinese and Japanese and occasionally in Traditional Chinese.

== Evolution ==
虫 originally meant snake while 蟲 meant insect 蟲 was later simplified back to 虫 in both shinjitai and simplified Chinese characters.

Oracle bone script character

Bronze script character

Small seal script character

== Derived characters ==
Strokes	Characters
+0	虫 (also SC and JP form of 蟲)
+1	虬^{SC} (=虯)
+2	虭 虮^{SC} (=蟣) 虯 虰 虱^{SC/JP} (=蝨) 虲
+3	虳 虴 虵 虶 虷 虸 虹 虺 虻 虼 虽^{SC} (=雖 -> 隹) 虾^{SC} (=蝦) 虿^{SC} (=蠆) 蚀^{SC} (=蝕) 蚁^{SC} (=蟻) 蚂^{SC} (=螞) 蚃
+4	蚄 蚅 蚆 蚇 蚉 (=蚊) 蚊 蚋 蚌 蚍 蚎 蚏 蚐 蚑 蚒 蚓 蚔 蚕^{SC/JP} (=蠶) 蚖 蚗 蚘 (=蛔) 蚙 蚚 蚛 蚜 蚝^{SC} (=蠔) 蚞 蚟 蚠 蚡 (=鼢 -> 鼠) 蚢 蚣 蚤 蚥 蚦 (=蚺) 蚧 蚨 蚩 蚪 蚬^{SC} (=蜆)
+5	蚫 蚭 蚮 蚯 蚰 蚱 蚲 蚳 蚴 蚵 蚶 蚷 蚸 蚹 蚺 蚻 蚼 蚽 蚾 蚿 蛀 蛁 蛂 蛃 蛄 蛅 蛆 蛇 蛈 蛉 蛊^{SC} (=蠱) 蛋 蛌 蛍^{JP} (=螢) 蛎^{SC} (=蠣) 蛏^{SC} (=蟶)
+6	蚈 蛐 蛑 蛒 蛓 蛔 蛕 (=蛔) 蛗 蛘 蛙 蛚 蛛 蛜 蛝 蛞 蛟 蛠 (=珕 -> 玉) 蛡 蛢 蛣 蛤 蛥 蛦 蛧 蛨 蛩 蛪 蛫 蛬 (=蛩) 蛭 蛮^{SC}/蛮^{JP} (=蠻) 蛯 蛰^{SC} (=蟄) 蛱^{SC} (=蛺) 蛲^{SC} (=蟯) 蛳^{SC} (=螄) 蛴^{SC} (=蠐)
+7	蛖 蛵 蛶 蛷 蛸 蛹 蛺 蛻 蛼 蛽 蛾 蛿 蜀 蜁 蜂 蜃 蜄 (=蜃) 蜅 蜆 蜇 蜈 蜉 蜊 蜋 (=螂) 蜌 蜍 蜎 蜏 蜐 蜑 蜒 蜓 蜔 蜕^{SC} (=蛻) 蜖 (=蛔) 蜗^{SC} (=蝸) 蜫 (=䖵) 蝆
+8	蜘 蜙 (=蚣) 蜚 蜛 蜜 蜝 (=蜞) 蜞 蜟 蜠 蜡^{SC} (=蠟) 蜢 蜣 蜤 蜥 蜦 蜧 蜨 蜩 蜪 蜬 蜭 蜮 蜯 蜰 蜱 蜲 蜳 蜴 蜵 蜶 蜷 蜸 蜹 蜺 蜻 蜼 蜽 蜾 蜿 蝀 蝁 蝂 蝃 蝄 蝅 (=蠶) 蝇^{SC} (=蠅) 蝈^{SC} (=蟈) 蝉^{SC} (=蟬) 蝊 蝋^{JP} (=蠟)
+9	蝌 蝍 蝎^{SC} (=蠍) 蝏 蝐 蝑 蝒 蝓 蝔 蝕 蝖 蝗 蝘 蝙 蝚 蝛 蝜 蝝 蝞 蝟 蝠 蝡 蝢 蝣 蝤 蝥 蝦 蝧 蝨 蝩 蝪 蝫 蝬 蝭 蝮 蝯 (=猿 -> 犬) 蝰 蝱 (=虻) 蝲 蝳 蝴 蝵 蝶 蝷 蝸 蝺 蝻 蝼^{SC} (=螻) 蝽 蝾^{SC} (=蠑) 蝿^{JP} (=蠅) 螀 (=螿) 蟡
+10	蝹 螁 螂 螃 螄 螅 螆 螇 螈 螉 螊 螋 螌 融 螎 (=融) 螏 螐 螑 螒 螓 螔 螕 螖 螗 螘 螙 螚 螛 螜 螝 螞 螟 螠 螡 (=蚊) 螢 螣 螤 螥 螦 螧 螨^{SC} (=蟎) 螩 蟗
+11	螪 螫 螬 螭 螮 螯 螰 螱 螲 螳 螴 螵 螶 螷 螸 螹 螺 螻 螼 螽 螾 螿 蟀 蟁 (=蚊) 蟂 蟃 蟄 蟅 蟆 蟇 (=蟆) 蟈 蟉 蟊 蟋 蟌 蟍 蟎 蟏^{SC} (=蠨) 蟐 蟑 蟒 蠁
+12	蟓 蟔 蟕 蟖 蟘 蟙 蟚 蟛 蟜 蟝 蟞 蟟 蟠 蟢 蟣 蟤 蟥 蟦 蟧 蟨 蟩 蟪 蟫 蟬 蟭 蟮 蟯 蟰 蟱 蟲 蟳 蟴 蟵 蠎 (=蟒)
+13	蟶 蟷 蟸 (=蠡) 蟹 蟺 蟻 蟼 蟽 蟾 蟿 蠀 蠂 蠃 蠄 蠅 蠆 蠇 蠈 蠉 蠊 蠋 蠌 蠍 蠏 (=蟹)
+14	蠐 蠑 蠒 (=繭 -> 糸) 蠓 蠔 蠕 蠖 蠗 蠘 蠙
+15	蠚 蠛 蠜 蠝 蠞 蠟 蠠 蠡 蠢 蠣 蠤 蠴
+16	蠥 蠦 蠧 (=蠹) 蠨 蠩 蠪 蠫 蠬
+17	蠭 (=蜂) 蠮 蠯 蠰 蠱 蠲 蠳
+18	蠵 蠶 蠷 蠸 蠹 蠺 (=蠶)
+19	蠻
+20	蠼
+21	蠽 蠾
+22	蠿

== Hanzi ==
The radical is also used as an independent Chinese character. It is a 1st grade Kyōiku kanji.

== Literature ==
- Fazzioli, Edoardo (1987). Chinese calligraphy : from pictograph to ideogram : the history of 214 essential Chinese/Japanese characters. calligraphy by Rebecca Hon Ko. New York: Abbeville Press. ISBN 0-89659-774-1.
