= Robert Begerau =

German footballer

Personal information
- Full name: Robert Begerau
- Date of birth: 17 July 1947 (age 79)
- Place of birth: Büdelsdorf, Germany
- Height: 1.74 m (5 ft 9 in)
- Position: Midfielder

Youth career
- SF Vorst

Senior career*
Years	Team	Apps	(Gls)
–1970	VfR Neuss		
1970–1975	Fortuna Düsseldorf	36	(4)

Managerial career
- 1993–1994: Borussia Mönchengladbach (co-trainer)
- * Club domestic league appearances and goals

Robert Begerau (born 17 July 1947 in Büdelsdorf) is a former German footballer.

Begerau made two appearances for Fortuna Düsseldorf in the Bundesliga during his playing career, which was cut short through injury.
