= Liuyue =

Sixth month of the Chinese calendar

Liùyuè

Chinese name
- Chinese: 六月
- Hanyu Pinyin: Liùyuè
Transcriptions
Standard Mandarin
- Hanyu Pinyin: Liùyuè

Korean name
- Hangul: 유월
- Hanja: 六月
Transcriptions
- Revised Romanization: Yuwol

Traditional Korean name
- Hangul: 양달
- Hanja: 未月
Transcriptions
- Revised Romanization: Yangdal

Japanese name
- Kanji: 六月
- Kana: ろくがつ
Transcriptions
- Romanization: Rokugatsu

Traditional Japanese name
- Kanji: 水無月
- Kana: みなづき
Transcriptions
- Romanization: Minazuki

Liùyuè (Chinese: 六月) is the sixth month of the Chinese calendar and calendars based on it such as the Japanese calendar, Korean calendar and Vietnamese calendar. It follows Wǔyuè and precedes Qīyuè. It is known in Japanese as Rokugatsu (Japanese: 六月) or traditionally Minazuki (Japanese: 水無月), and in Korean as Yuwol (Korean: 유월; Hanja: 六月) or traditionally Yangdal (Korean: 양달; Hanja: 未月). All of these words can also refer to the month of June in the Gregorian calendar.

== Names ==
In Mandarin Chinese, traditional names of the month include héyuè (Chinese: 荷月) and jìxià (Chinese: 季夏)..

In Japanese, the month is known as rokugatsu (Japanese: 六月) or traditionally minazuki (Japanese: 水無月). Although the spelling 水無月 can suggest a month without water, since the character 無 normally means "absent" or "not exist", it is used in 水無月 only as an ateji for a possessive particle equivalent to no, giving the sense "month of water". This is a reference to the flooding of the rice fields, which requires large amounts of water.

In Kyoto, minazuki (水無月) is also the name of a triangular uirō sweet topped with adzuki beans, traditionally eaten in summer.

== Observances ==
- The Double Sixth Festival is held on the 6th day of the 6th month.
- Yudu is celebrated on the 15th day of the 6th month in Korea.
- Nagoshi no harae, the summer great purification, was traditionally performed on the last day of the 6th month in Japan.

== Dates ==
Below is a list of the start and end dates of Liùyuè in the Gregorian calendar. Because the 1-hour difference between China and Japan/Korea occasionally affects the date on which a new moon occurs, the dates below can differ from those of the Japanese and Korean calendars.

Dates of Liùyuè
Year	First day	Last day
2016	4 July	2 August
2017	24 June	22 July
2017 (leap)	23 July	21 August
2018	13 July	10 August
2019	3 July	31 July
2020	21 July	18 August
2021	10 July	7 August
2022	29 June	28 July
2023	18 July	15 August
2024	6 July	3 August
2025	25 June	24 July
2025 (leap)	25 July	22 August
2026	14 July	12 August
2027	4 July	1 August
2028	22 July	19 August
2029	11 July	9 August
2030	1 July	29 July
2031	19 July	17 August
2032	7 July	5 August
2033	27 June	25 July
2034	16 July	13 August
2035	5 July	3 August
2036	24 June	22 July
2036 (leap)	23 July	21 August
