= Rupert Atkinson (RAF officer) =

British World War I flying ace

Rupert Norman Gould Atkinson
- Born: 17 July 1896; Shanghai, China
- Died: 7 March 1919 (aged 22); Berkhamsted, Hertfordshire, England
- Burial place: Church of St Peter, Great Berkhamsted
- Spouse: Margaret Hillier (Engaged at his time of death)
- Relatives: Rowan Atkinson (Actor & Comedian)
- Military career
- Allegiance: United Kingdom
- Branch: British Army; Royal Flying Corps; Royal Air Force
- Service years: 1914–1919
- Rank: Captain
- Units: 15th Middlesex Regiment; 10 Squadron RFC; 98 Squadron RAF; 206 Squadron RAF; 90 Squadron RAF
- Conflicts: World War I; Kamerun campaign; Western Front
- Awards: Military Cross; Distinguished Flying Cross; Croix de Guerre (Belgium)

Captain Rupert Norman Gould Atkinson MC DFC* (17 July 1896 – 7 March 1919) was a British World War I flying ace credited with five aerial victories.

== Biography ==
Rupert Atkinson was born in Shanghai, China, the elder son of John Brenan Atkinson and Amelie Sophie Gould. He was educated at Orley Farm School, Harrow, and at Marlborough College, Wiltshire. He was enrolled at Pembroke College, Cambridge in June 1914, and joined the 16th (Public Schools) Battalion, Middlesex Regiment in September.

On 2 December 1914 he received his commission as a temporary Second Lieutenant in the 15th Middlesex Regiment. On 28 July 1915, he was sent to Cameroon, where he was attached to the West African Frontier Force in the Kamerun campaign. Atkinson was eventually invalided back to England, arriving at Liverpool aboard the SS Mendi on 2 April 1916.

In August 1916 Atkinson joined the Royal Flying Corps, receiving Royal Aero Club Aviator's Certificate No.3646 at the military flying school at Brooklands on 28 September.

He arrived at the Western Front in November 1916, joining 10 Squadron RFC. He was promoted to captain in July 1917, becoming a flight commander shortly afterwards.

Atkinson was engaged in reconnaissance, night-bombing, and ground attacks, and was awarded the Military Cross on 18 October 1917. His citation reads:

Temporary Captain Rupert Norman Gould Atkinson, General List and RFC.
For conspicuous gallantry and devotion to duty. This officer has done a large amount of successful artillery work, has taken part in many night bombing raids, and has continually distinguished himself by his fearlessness and determination in descending to low altitudes in order to attack hostile infantry and machine guns. On one occasion, also, he successfully attacked and drove down a hostile balloon.

Between May and October 1918 while flying an Airco DH.9 and serving with 98 Squadron RAF, and later with 206 Squadron RAF, Atkinson scored five aerial victories.

On 2 November 1918 he was awarded the Distinguished Flying Cross:

Captain Rupert Norman Gould Atkinson, MC.
A gallant and determined officer whose services over the lines since May last in long-distance and photographic reconnaissances, and as leader of bomb raids, have been of a very high order. On a recent occasion, when on solitary photographic reconnaissance at 15,000 feet, his machine was attacked by eight Fokker biplanes; one of these he shot down.

After the end of hostilities he served with the occupation forces in Cologne, Germany, in 90 Squadron RAF.

On 7 March 1919, while at home on leave, Atkinson died from pneumonia following influenza. He is buried in the cemetery of the Church of St Peter, Great Berkhamsted, Hertfordshire.

He was awarded a bar to his DFC on 30 May 1919, and the Croix de guerre from Belgium on 11 July 1919, both posthumously.

Victories
No.	Date	Unit	Aircraft	Opponent	Location
1	19 May 1918	98 Sqn.	D.H.9 (B7657)	Fokker Dr.I	NW. of Roulers
2	19 May 1918	98 Sqn.	D.H.9 (B7657)	Pfalz D.III	NW. of Roulers
3	30 August 1918	206 Sqn.	D.H.9 (D1718)	Fokker D.VII	Nieppe
4	4 September 1918	206 Sqn.	D.H.9 (D1718)	Balloon	Frelinghien
5	14 October 1918	206 Sqn.	D.H.9 (D569)	Fokker D.VII	Lendelede
