= List of aircraft at the Royal Air Force Museum London =

This list of aircraft at the Royal Air Force Museum London summarises the collection of aircraft and engines that is housed at the Royal Air Force Museum London.

== Hangars ==
=== Hangar 1 ===
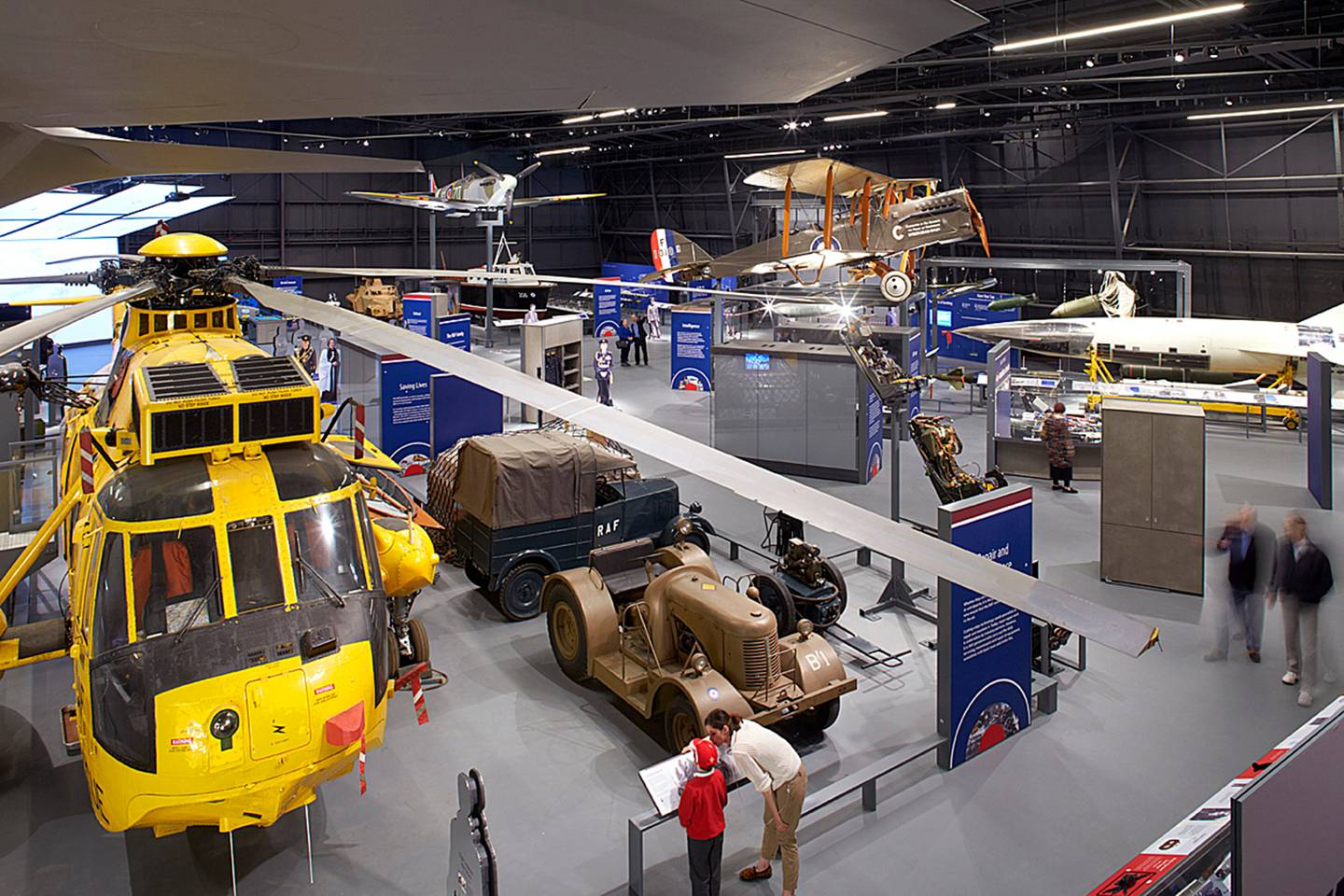
Overview of the RAF Stories exhibition with the Sea King search and rescue helicopter on the left.

Main point of entry to the museum with shop and corporate areas.

| Image | Type | Identity | Markings/Notes | Ref |
|---|---|---|---|---|
| More images | de Havilland DH.9A | F1010 | Code: C | |
| More images | Hawker Siddeley Gnat T.1 | XR977 | Code: 3 Red Arrows | |
| | Lockheed F-35 Full Scale Model | BAPC.341 | | |
| More images | Short Sunderland MR.5 | ML824 | Code: NS-Z of 201 Squadron | |
| More images | Supermarine Spitfire Vb | BL614 | Code: ZD:F of 222 Squadron | |
| More images | Westland Sea King HAR.3 | XZ585 | Code: A | |

=== Hangar 2 (The Grahame-White Factory) ===
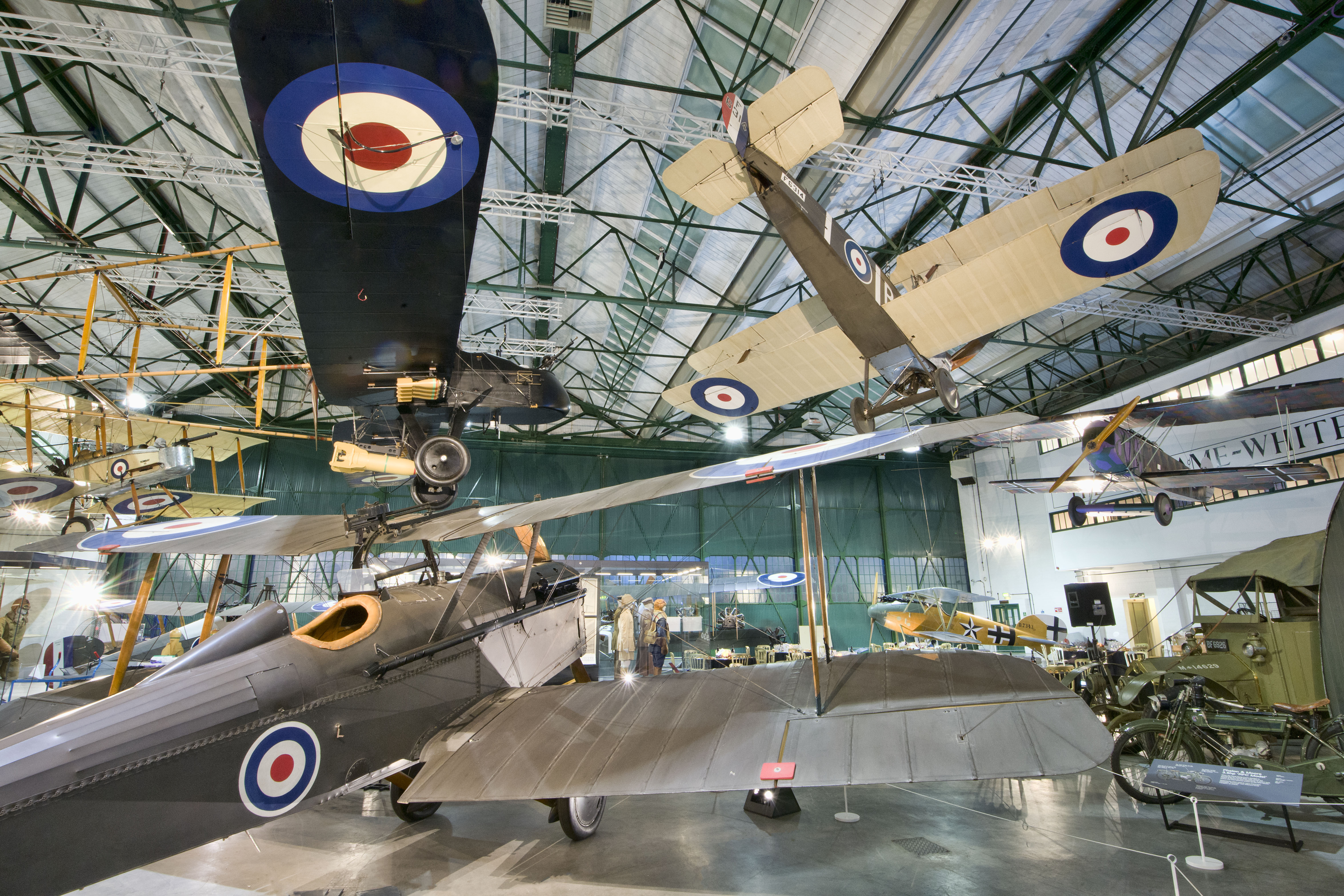
Hangar 2, Grahame-White Factory interior, Royal Aircraft Factory SE.5a in the foreground, FE.2b, Sopwith Camel and Fokker D.VII suspended from the ceiling

| Image | Type | Identity | Markings/Notes | Ref |
|---|---|---|---|---|
| More images | Albatros D.Va; Replica | 'D.7343/17' | German Air Service | |
| More images | Avro 504K | E449 | | |
| More images | Blériot XXVII | 433 | | |
| More images | Bristol F.2b Fighter | E2466 | | |
| More images | Caudron G.3 | 3066 | | |
| More images | Fokker DVII | 8417/18 | German Air Service | |
| More images | Royal Aircraft Factory B.E.2b; Replica | 687 | | |
| More images | Royal Aircraft Factory F.E.2b; Replica | A6526 | | |
| More images | Royal Aircraft Factory R.E.8; Replica | 'A3930' | Code: B of 9 Squadron | |
| More images | Royal Aircraft Factory S.E.5A | F938 | | |
| More images | Sopwith F1 Camel | F6314 | Code: B | |
| More images | Sopwith Dolphin 5F1 | C3988 | | |
| More images | Sopwith Triplane | N5912 | | |
| More images | Vickers FB5 "Gunbus"; Replica | 2345 | | |

=== Hangar 3 and 4 (Historic Hangars) ===
| Image | Type | Identity | Markings/Notes | Ref |
|---|---|---|---|---|
| More images | Avro Rota | K4232 | | |
| More images | BAC Lightning F.6 | XS925 | Code: BA of 11 Squadron | |
| More images | BAC Jet Provost T.5A | XW323 | Code: 86 | |
| More images | Bristol Beaufighter TF.X | RD253 | | |
| More images | Bristol Beaufort VIII | DD931 | Code:L | |
| More images | Bristol Bulldog MkIIA | K2227 | | |
| More images | Bristol Sycamore HR.14 | XJ918 | | |
| More images | de Havilland Canada DHC-1 Chipmunk T.10 | WP962 | One of the aircraft used in RAF Exercise Northern Venture | |
| More images | de Havilland Vampire F.3 | VT812 | Code: N | |
| More images | English Electric Canberra PR.3 | WE139 | Winner of a UK to New Zealand Air Race in 1953 | |
| More images | Fiat CR.42 Falco | MM5701 | Regia Aeronautica | |
| More images | Gloster Gladiator II | N5628 | Forward fuselage only | |
| More images | Gloster Meteor F.8 | WH301 | | |
| | Handley Page Hampden TB.1 | P1344 | Fuselage Only | |
| | Handley Page Hereford | L6012 | Damaged Rear Fuselage Only | |
| More images | Hawker Hart II | J9941 | | |
| More images | Hawker Hurricane I | P2617 | Code AF-F of 607 Squadron | |
| More images | Hawker Tempest V | NV778 | Target Towing markings | |
| More images | Hawker Typhoon IB | MN235 | | |
| More images | Lockheed Hudson IIIA | A16-199 | Royal Australian Air Force | |
| More images | McDonnell Douglas Phantom FGR.2 | XV424 | | |
| More images | Messerschmitt Bf 109E-3 | 4101/DG200 | Luftwaffe Code: 12 | |
| More images | North American Harvard IIB | FE905 | | |
| | Hunting Percival Pembroke C.1 | WV746 | No. 60 Squadron RAF at RAF Wildenrath | |
| | Scottish Aviation Twin Pioneer CC.2 | XL993 | Formerly at RAFM Midlands | |
| More images | Sikorsky R-4 | KL110 / KK995 | | |
| More images | Sopwith Snipe | 'E6655' | Code: B of 1 Squadron (a Composite Reconstruction) | |
| More images | Supermarine Southampton | N9899 | Restored wooden fuselage | |
| More images | Supermarine Spitfire I | X4590 | Code: PR:F of 609 Squadron | |
| More images | Supermarine Spitfire XVI | RW393 wears TB675 | Code 4D-V of 74 Squadron | |
| More images | Supermarine Spitfire F.24 | PK724 | | |
| More images | Supermarine Stranraer | 920 | Code: QN Royal Canadian Air Force | |
| More images | Taylorcraft Auster I | LB264 | | |
| More images | Westland Belvedere HC.1 | XG474 | Code: O | |
| More images | Westland Gazelle HT.3 | XW855 | | |
| More images | Westland Wessex HCC.4 | XV732 | Royal Transport | |

=== Hangar 5 (The Bomber Hall) ===
| Image | Type | Identity | Markings/Notes | Ref |
|---|---|---|---|---|
| More images | Airspeed Oxford I | MP425 | Code: G | |
| More images | Avro Anson I | W2068 | Code: 68 | |
| More images | Avro Lancaster I | R5868 | Code PO-S of 467 Squadron | |
| More images | Avro Vulcan B.2 | XL318 | | |
| More images | Boeing B-17G Flying Fortress | 44-83868 | United States Army Air Force | |
| More images | Consolidated B-24L Liberator | KN751 | Code: F Snake | |
| More images | Curtiss Kittyhawk IV | FX760 | | |
| | de Havilland Chipmunk T.10 | WP912 | used by the Duke of Edinburgh for flight training Aberdeen University Air Squadron | |
| More images | de Havilland Mosquito B.35 | TJ138 | Code: VO-L of 98 Squadron | |
| More images | Fairey Battle | L5343 | Code: VO-S of 98 Squadron | |
| More images | Handley Page Halifax II | W1048 | Recovered wreck Code: TL-S of 35 Squadron | |
| | Handley Page Victor K.2 | XM717 | Nose Section 'Lucky Lou' | |
| More images | Heinkel He 111H-20 | 701152 | Code: NT+SL Luftwaffe | |
| More images | Heinkel He 162A-2 | VN679 | Code: 2 of Luftwaffe | |
| More images | Junkers Ju 87G-2 | 494083 | Code: RI+JK Luftwaffe | |
| More images | Kawasaki Ki-100 | | Code 24 of Japanese Army | |
| More images | Messerschmitt Bf 110G-4 | 730301 | Luftwaffe | |
| More images | Messerschmitt Me 163B-1a Komet | 191614 | Luftwaffe | |
| More images | Mitsubishi Ki-46 ‘Dinah’ | n/a | Japanese Army | |
| More images | North American P-51D Mustang | 413317 | Code: VF:B 'Donald Duck' United States Army Air Force | |
| More images | Republic Thunderbolt II | KL216 | | |
| | Short Stirling III | LK488 | Recovered Tail Section | |
| More images | Slingsby T-31B Cadet TX.3 C/N 844 | XA302 | | |
| More images | Yokosuka MXY-7 Ohka | n/a | Japan | |

=== Hangar 6 (Age of Uncertainty) ===
| Image | Type | Identity | Markings/Notes | Ref |
|---|---|---|---|---|
| More images | BAe Harrier GR.9 | ZG477 | Painted in 2010 retirement markings | |
| | Boeing CH-47D Chinook | 83-24104 | Forward fuselage only in RAF Markings | |
| More images | Eurofighter Typhoon | ZH588 | Prototype | |
| More images | General Atomics MQ-1B Predator | 03-3119 | United States Air Force | |
| More images | Hawker Siddeley Buccaneer S.2B | XW547 | | |
| More images | Lockheed WC-130E Hercules | 64-0553 | Cockpit section United States Air Force | |
| More images | Panavia Tornado GR.1B | ZA457 | Code: AJ-J 'Bob' of 617 Squadron | |
| More images | SEPECAT Jaguar GR.1 | XX824 | Code: AD | |

== Engines on display ==
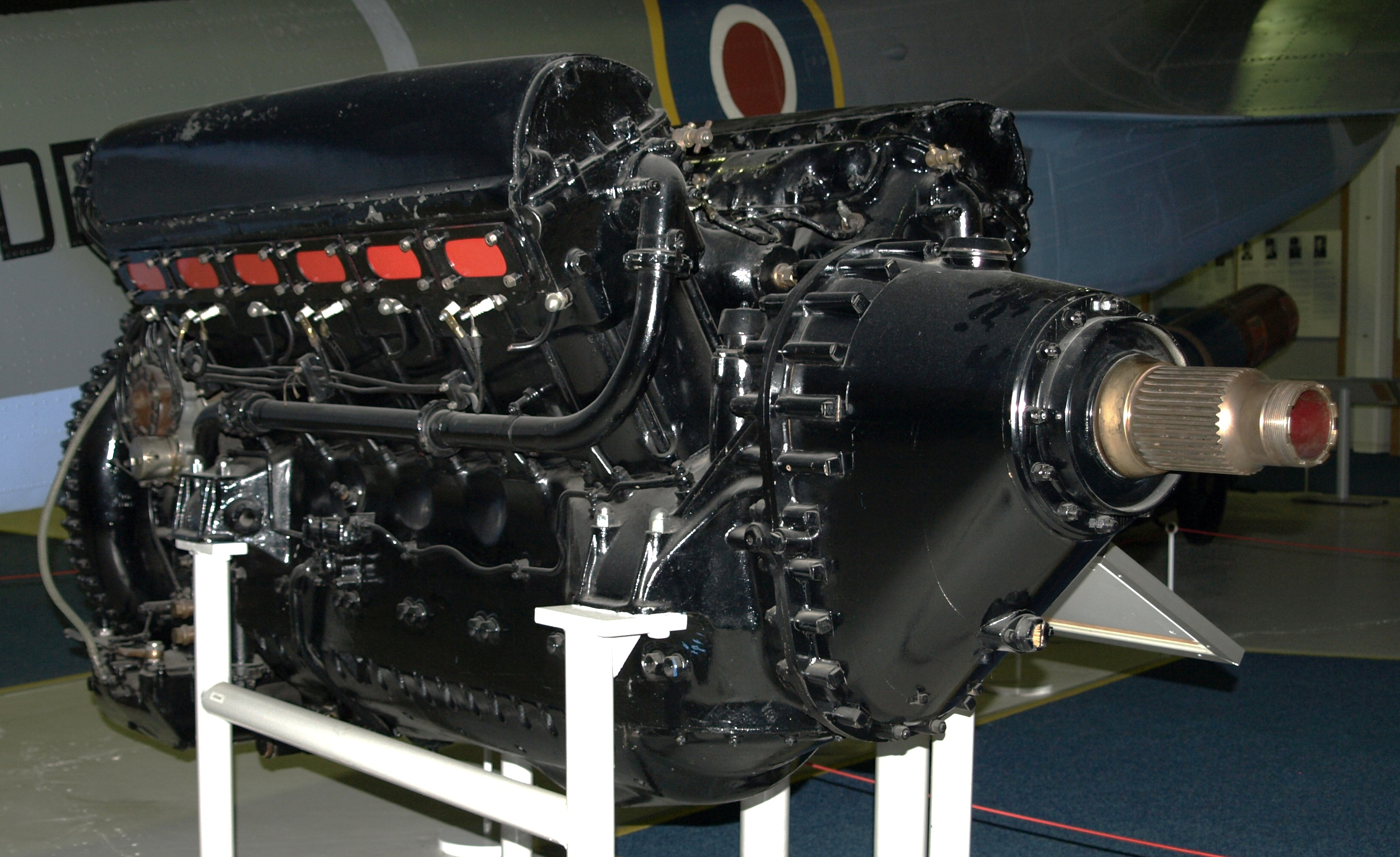
The Rolls Royce R

- Bentley BR2
- Bristol Jupiter
- Bristol Mercury
- Bristol Hercules XVIII
- Curtiss OX-5
- Daimler-Benz DB 605
- Gnome Monosoupape
- Gnome Omega
- Green C.4
- Hispano-Suiza 8
- Lycoming T55
- Junkers Jumo 004
- Liberty L-12
- Napier Dagger
- Napier Gazelle
- Napier Double Scorpion
- Napier Lion VII
- Napier Sabre III
- Power Jets W.2B/500
- Rolls-Royce Avon Mk.203
- Rolls-Royce Derwent V
- Rolls-Royce Derwent 8
- Rolls-Royce Eagle
- Rolls-Royce Hawk
- Rolls-Royce Griffon
- Rolls-Royce Kestrel IB
- Rolls-Royce Merlin III
- Rolls-Royce Merlin XX
- Rolls-Royce Merlin 23
- Rolls-Royce Pegasus
- Rolls-Royce Spey
- Rolls-Royce R
- Sunbeam Arab I

== See also ==
- Royal Air Force Museum Midlands
  - List of aircraft at the Royal Air Force Museum Midlands
