= Bristol Type 173 =

1950s British helicopter

Type 173
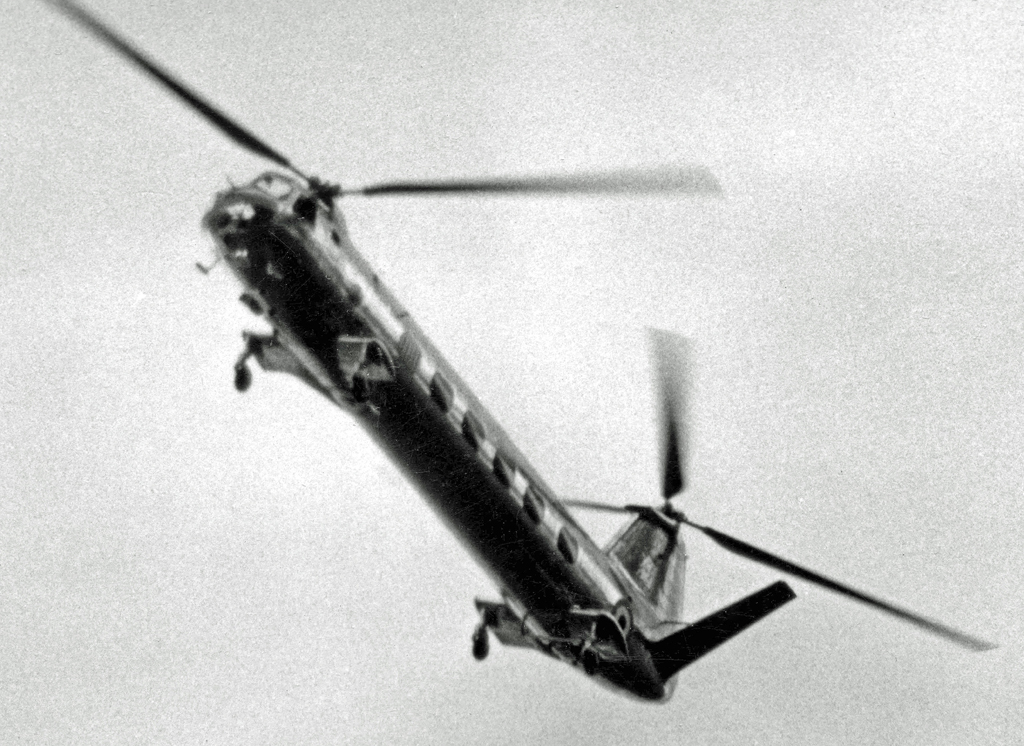
- Second prototype Bristol 173 demonstrating at the 1954 Farnborough Air Show

General information
- Type: 13-seat passenger helicopter
- Manufacturer: Bristol Aeroplane Company
- Number built: 5

History
- First flight: 3 January 1952
- Developed into: Bristol Belvedere

The Bristol Type 173 was a British twin-engine, tandem rotor transport helicopter built by the Bristol Aeroplane Company. It was designed by Raoul Hafner as a civil transport helicopter but evoked interest from the military. It did not enter production but was developed into the Bristol Belvedere which was operated by the Royal Air Force from 1961 to 1969.

== Design and development ==
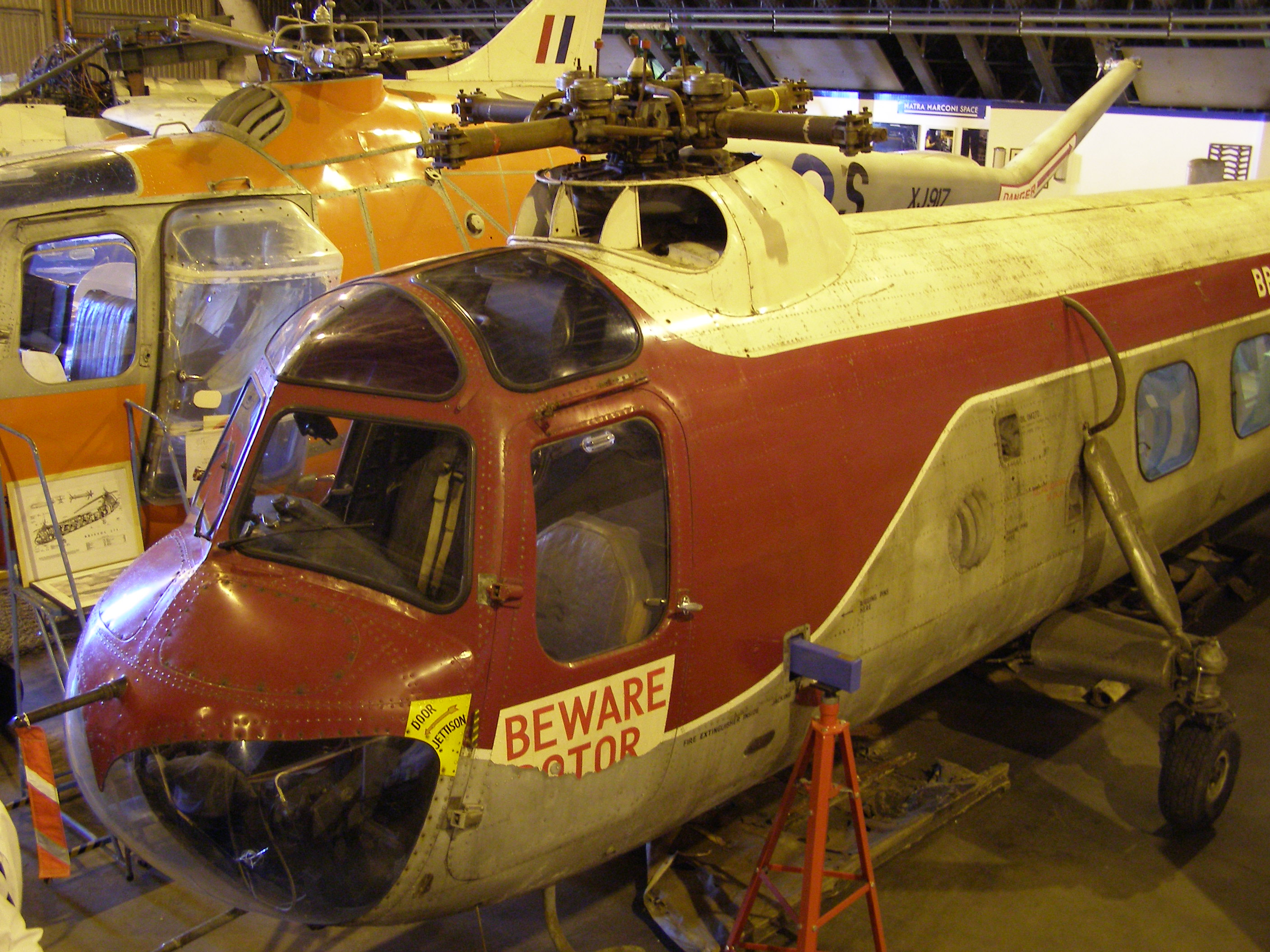
The first prototype Bristol 173 in the Bristol Aero Collection at Kemble airfield in 2006

The Type 173 was a tandem rotor development of the earlier Type 171 Sycamore single-rotor helicopter. It used two Sycamore Leonides Major engine and rotor installations with a new fuselage. The rotor gearboxes were connected by a shaft which enabled one engine to drive both rotors if an engine failed.

The first Type 173 Mk 1 registered G-ALBN made its first hovering flight on 3 January 1952 but it tended to fly backwards. After landing from a second hovering flight ground resonance developed. Modifications to the aircraft to correct these shortcomings delayed the first flight out of the hover, which occurred on 24 August 1952.

During 1953 it was evaluated by the Royal Air Force (using serial number XF785) and also carried out sea trials for the Royal Navy on the aircraft carrier HMS Eagle. To overcome resonance in the fuselage it was later fitted with four-bladed rotors.

The second Type 173 was designated Type 173 Mk 2 and allocated military serial XH379, and had a revised landing gear, with castoring front wheels and fixed rear wheels. It was also fitted with small stub wings at the front and rear to improve the cruise speed, the stub wings being removed after a few flights when the helicopter was used for Naval trials, and a horizontal tailplane was added. As a result of the trials the Royal Navy showed an interest in ordering the type for carrier duties.

In August 1956 the second prototype was leased to British European Airways for evaluation. The Mk 2 aircraft was destroyed in an accident during an air show at Filton in September 1956. The helicopter crashed into the ground nose first while making the transition from hover to forward flight. The crew escaped unharmed but the aircraft was written off. After the crash the tailplane was salvaged from the Mk 2 and fitted to the Mk 1 to investigate the best configuration for stability. The Mk 1 and Mk 2 prototypes were fitted with two 9-cylinder Alvis Leonides 73 engines, each rated at 550hp (410 kW)

The company received a contract for three evaluation helicopters from the Ministry of Supply, these improved Type 173 Mk 3 had four-bladed rotors, a taller aft pylon for improved efficiency in gusty air, stronger airframes and were powered by 14-cylinder 850 hp Alvis Leonides Major engines. They were to be used for evaluation by the Royal Air Force and Royal Navy which has both issued specifications in 1953 for tandem helicopters.

The Royal Navy requirement (Specification HR.146) was for a Leonides Major-powered aircraft for a shipborne helicopter for anti-submarine, rescue and transport duties, Specification HR.149 was for a similar aircraft for the Royal Canadian Navy. The Royal Air Force issued specification H.150 for a general-purpose transport helicopter with the ability to lift bulky external loads.

Bristol produced three designs, the Type 191 to meet the Royal Navy requirement, Type 192 for the Royal Air Force and the Type 193 to be built in Canada for the Royal Canadian Navy. In April 1956 orders were placed for 94 helicopters of all three types, prototypes with Leonides Major engines and production aircraft to use Napier Gazelle turboshafts.

The third Type 173 was first hovered on 9 November 1956 but further flights were stopped when engine overheating and transmission failures were experienced during ground rig trials. Although these problems were not severe they were used by the Admiralty as part of the case to cancel the British naval order and place an alternate order for the Westland-built variant of the US Sikorsky S-58.

Soon afterwards Canada cancelled the Type 193 in an economy drive. The company concentrated on the Gazelle-engined Type 192 for the Royal Air Force and the first two of the cancelled Type 191s were used as Gazelle ground test rigs, the third being used as a control fatigue rig. The original Royal Air Force order for 22 was increased to 26, and the first Type 192 (later given the service name Belvedere) flew on 5 July 1958.

== Variants ==
Type 173 Mk 1
First prototype.
Type 173 Mk 2
Second prototype.
Type 173 Mk 3
Three more prototypes for military evaluation with four-bladed rotors.
Type 191
Projected naval version. Never flown; first two aircraft used as Gazelle ground test rigs for Type 192.
Type 192
Military transport helicopter for the Royal Air Force, named Belvedere.
Type 193
Variant of the Type 191 for the Royal Canadian Navy, not built.

== Operators ==
United Kingdom

- British European Airways for evaluation
- Royal Air Force for evaluation
- Royal Navy for evaluation

== Aircraft on display ==
The prototype Type 173 XF785 was stored at the RAF Museum Cosford until 2002, when it was moved to Kemble for display at the Bristol Aero Collection, until that site closed in May 2012. It was subsequently moved to Aerospace Bristol.

== Specifications (Type 173 Mk 2) ==
Data from Bristol Aircraft since 1910.

General characteristics

- Crew: two
- Capacity: 13 passengers
- Length: 55 ft 2 in (16.82 m)
- Height: 15 ft 0 in (4.57 m)
- Empty weight: 7,820 lb (3,547 kg)
- Gross weight: 11,000 lb (4,990 kg)
- Powerplant: 2 × Alvis Leonides Major air-cooled 14-cylinder radial , 550 hp (410 kW) each
- Main rotor diameter: 2 × 48 ft 7 in (14.81 m)

Performance

- Cruise speed: 115 mph (184 km/h, 100 kn)
- Range: 185 mi (298 km, 161 nmi)
