= Alvis Leonides Major =

1930s British piston aircraft engine

Leonides Major
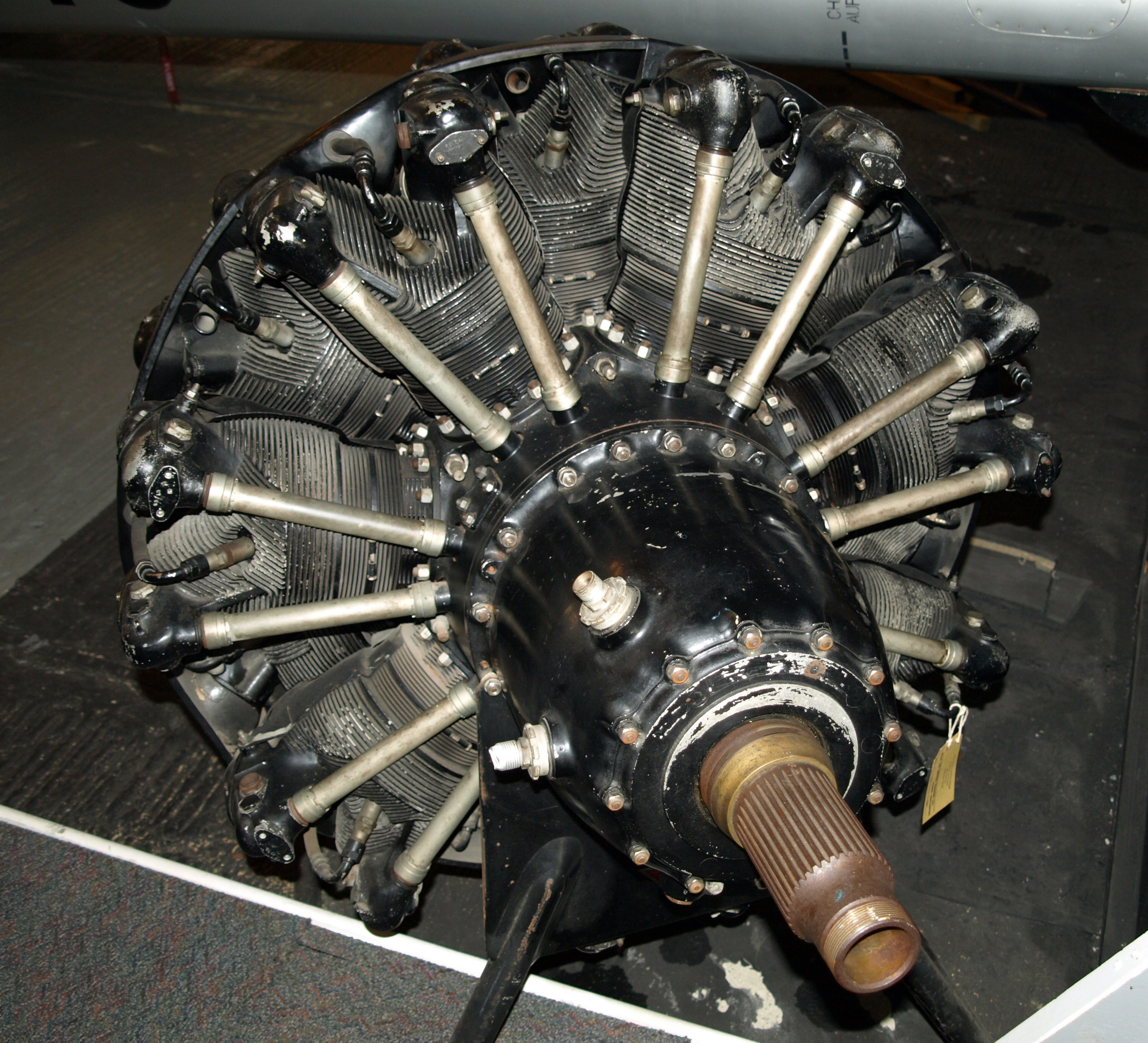
- Type: Radial engine
- National origin: United Kingdom
- Manufacturer: Alvis
- Major applications: Westland Whirlwind
- Developed from: Alvis Leonides

The Alvis Leonides Major is a British air-cooled 14-cylinder radial aero engine developed by Alvis from the earlier nine-cylinder Leonides.

== Design and development ==
In 1951 Alvis started development of a 14-cylinder, two row radial of 1,118 cu in (18.3 L) displacement, based on the Leonides. Certification covered the Mk. 702/1 for aeroplanes at 875 hp (652 kW) and the 751/1 for helicopters at 850 hp (630 kW). The only numerous model of the Major was the Mk. 755/1, a medium supercharged, de-rated, obliquely mounted direct-drive and fan cooled engine fitted to the Westland Whirlwind Mks. 5, 6, 7 and 8.

== Variants ==
Data from:British Piston Engines and their Aircraft.

Leonides Major 702/1
850–875 hp (634–652 kW) for aeroplanes, also known as A.LE.M.1-1 in Air Ministry
Leonides Major 751/1
850 hp (630 kW) for helicopters, also known as A.LE.M.1-2
Leonides Major 755/1
780 hp (580 kW) for helicopters in a 35° canted mounting, also known as A.LE.M.1-6 and as Mk.155 in civil aircraft
Leonides Major 755/2
780 hp (580 kW) for helicopters in a vertical mounting, also known as A.LE.M.1-6 and as Mk.160 in civil aircraft

== Applications ==
- Bristol Type 173 Mk3 – 2x 755/1 (Mk.155) 780 hp (580 kW); 2x 755/2 (Mk.160) 780 hp (580 kW)
- Handley Page HPR.5 Herald – four 850 hp (630 kW) 702/1
- Westland Whirlwind 1x 755/1 (Mk.155) or 1x 755/2 (Mk.160) 780 hp (580 kW)

== Specifications (Leonides Major 702/1) ==
Data from Jane's All the World's Aircraft 1956-57.

=== General characteristics ===
- Type: 14-cylinder twin-row air-cooled radial piston engine, geared down and supercharged
- Bore: 4.80 in (122 mm)
- Stroke: 4.41 in (112 mm)
- Displacement: 1,118 cu in (18.32 L)
- Length: 70.9 in (180 cm)
- Diameter: 38.9 in (99 cm)
- Dry weight: 1,200 lb (540 kg) (dry)

=== Components ===
- Valvetrain: 2 sodium cooled valves per cylinder, driven by 2 cam discs
- Supercharger: Single speed single stage driven at 6.5:1
- Fuel system: Fuel injection, low pressure via Hobson or SU pump
- Fuel type: 100/130 octane
- Oil system: Dry sump, pressure and scavenge pumps
- Cooling system: Air-cooled
- Reduction gear: Farman type epicyclic, ratio 0.533:1
- 2 spark plugs per cylinder, twin BTH C.14.C/1 magnetos

=== Performance ===
- Power output: (international rating) 860 hp (642 kW) at 1,500 ft (457 m)
- Compression ratio: 6.8:1
- Fuel consumption: 60 imp gal (72 US gal; 270 L) per hour (at maximum continuous power)
- Oil consumption: 6-12 pint/h (3.4-6.8 L/h)

== See also ==
Related development

- Alvis Leonides

Comparable engines

- Pratt & Whitney R-1535

Related lists

- List of aircraft engines
