= No. 72 Squadron RAF =

Flying squadron of the Royal Air Force

No. 72 (Fighter) Squadron RAF
- Active: 28 June 1917 – 1 April 1918 (RFC); 1 April 1918 – 22 Sept 1919 (RAF); 22 Feb 1937 – 30 December 1946; 1 February 1947 – 30 June 1961; 15 November 1961 – 1 April 2002; 12 July 2002 – 31 October 2019; 28 November 2019 – present
- Country: United Kingdom
- Branch: Royal Air Force
- Type: Flying training squadron
- Role: Advanced flying training
- Part of: No. 4 Flying Training School RAF
- Home station: RAF Valley
- Nickname: 'Basutoland'
- Motto: Swift
- Aircraft: Beechcraft Texan T1
- Battle honours: Mesopotamia (1918)*; Channel and North Sea (1939–1942); Dunkirk*; Battle of Britain (1940)*; Fortress Europe (1941–1942)*, North Africa (1942–1943)*; Mediterranean (1942–1943); Sicily (1943)*; Italy (1943–1945); Salerno*; Anzio and Nettuno*; * Honours marked with an asterisk are those emblazoned on the Squadron Standard

Insignia
- Squadron badge heraldry: A swift volant, intended to symbolise speed.
- Post 1950 squadron insignia
- Squadron codes: RN (Oct 1938 – Apr 1939); SD (Apr 1939 – Sep 1939); RN (Sep 1939 – Dec 1946); FG (Jan 1947 – Apr 1951); AA–AZ (Wessex)

Number 72 (Fighter) Squadron of the Royal Air Force is a training squadron that is currently based at RAF Valley using the Beechcraft Texan T1 to deliver Basic Fast Jet Training (BFJT).

No. 72 Squadron started life in 1917 supporting the British Army during World War I on operations in the Middle East, being disbanded in 1919. It was reformed in 1937, initially with Gloster Gladiator biplane fighters, moving on to fly Supermarine Spitfires during the Battle of Britain. For the remainder of World War II it served in a variety of theatres, ending up disbanded in Austria in 1946.

Reformed again in 1947, it was equipped with de Havilland Vampire jet fighters, moving on to the Gloster Meteor, and then the Gloster Javelin, flying these until 1961. After the jets, it moved to RAF Odiham and from 1961 until 1 April 2002 the squadron flew helicopters in the transport role. In 2002 it assumed its current role as a training unit, initially based at RAF Linton-on-Ouse using the Short Tucano T.1, before moving to RAF Valley and the Texan trainer.

The squadron nickname, "Basutoland", is derived from the fact that during both world wars, the Basutoland Protectorate, now Lesotho, donated aircraft to RAF, which were assigned to No. 72 Squadron.

== History ==
=== First World War ===
No. 72 Squadron was formed on 28 June 1917 at Upavon as a squadron of the Royal Flying Corps. On Christmas Day, the squadron left for the Middle East and regrouped at Basra on 2 March. Here, they split in three flights, each assisting the Army in their various missions, and were disbanded in Baghdad on 22 September 1919.

=== Second World War ===
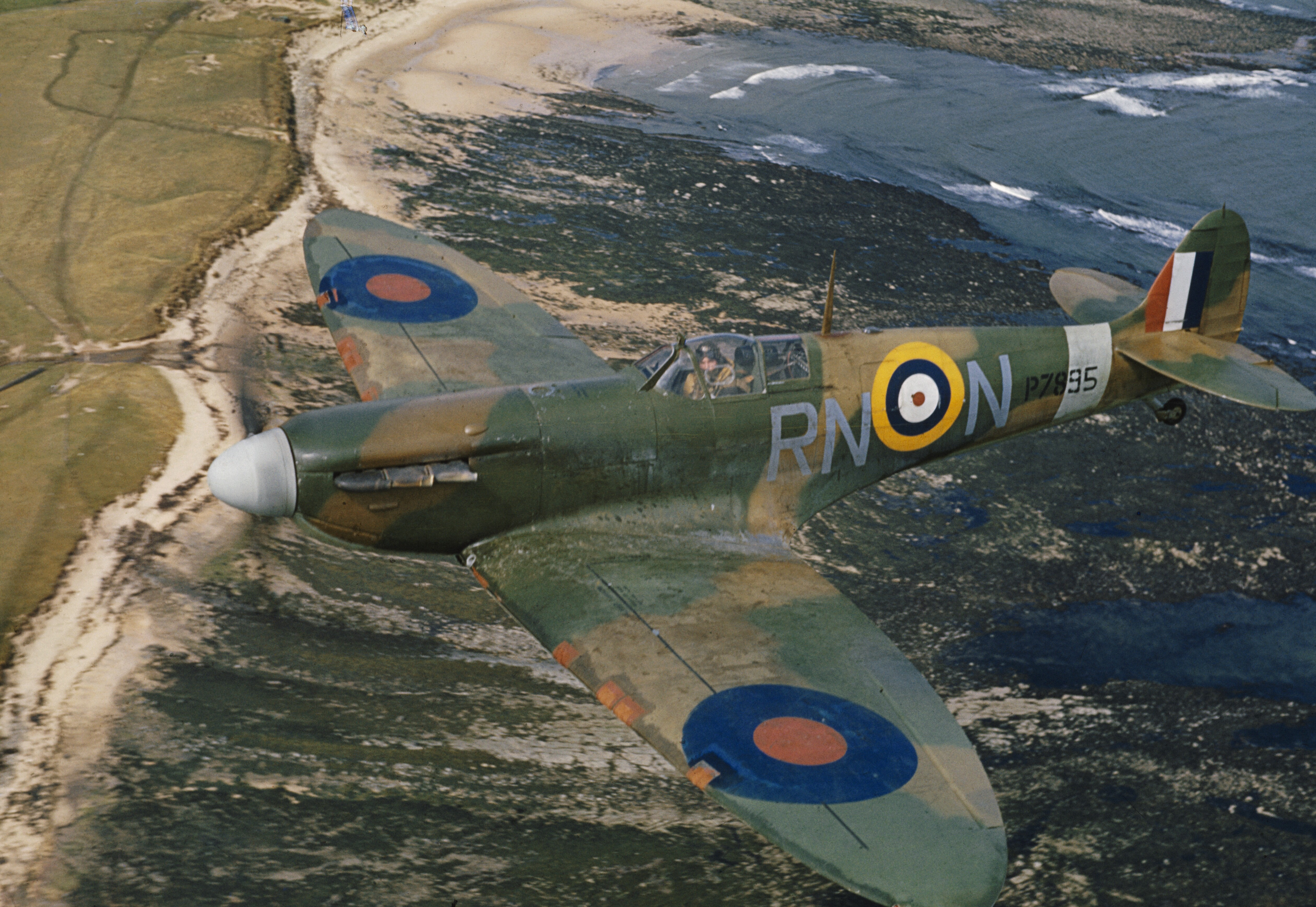
Supermarine Spitfire Mk.IIa, No. 72 Squadron, April 1941

No. 72 Squadron was reformed at RAF Tangmere on 22 February 1937 from 'B' flight of No. 1 Squadron, initially equipped with the Gloster Gladiators that came across from No. 1 Squadron. In 1939, these were replaced by Supermarine Spitfires, which were used for air defence and convoy protection duties following the start of World War II. Then, in May 1940, the squadron moved to RAF Gravesend to provide air cover for Operation Dynamo, the evacuation of Dunkirk.

At the start of the Battle of Britain, No. 72 Squadron was in the North of England at RAF Acklington as part of No. 13 Group, before moving south to RAF Biggin Hill during September to aid the main defence force. The squadron was then moved to North Africa to support the Tunisian campaign before being supplied with the updated Spitfire Mk.IX in 1942. They then assisted the British 8th Army as they advanced through Italy and France up until the German surrender. At this point they were moved to Austria. It was here they were disbanded on 30 December 1946 at Zeltweg.

=== Post-War jets ===
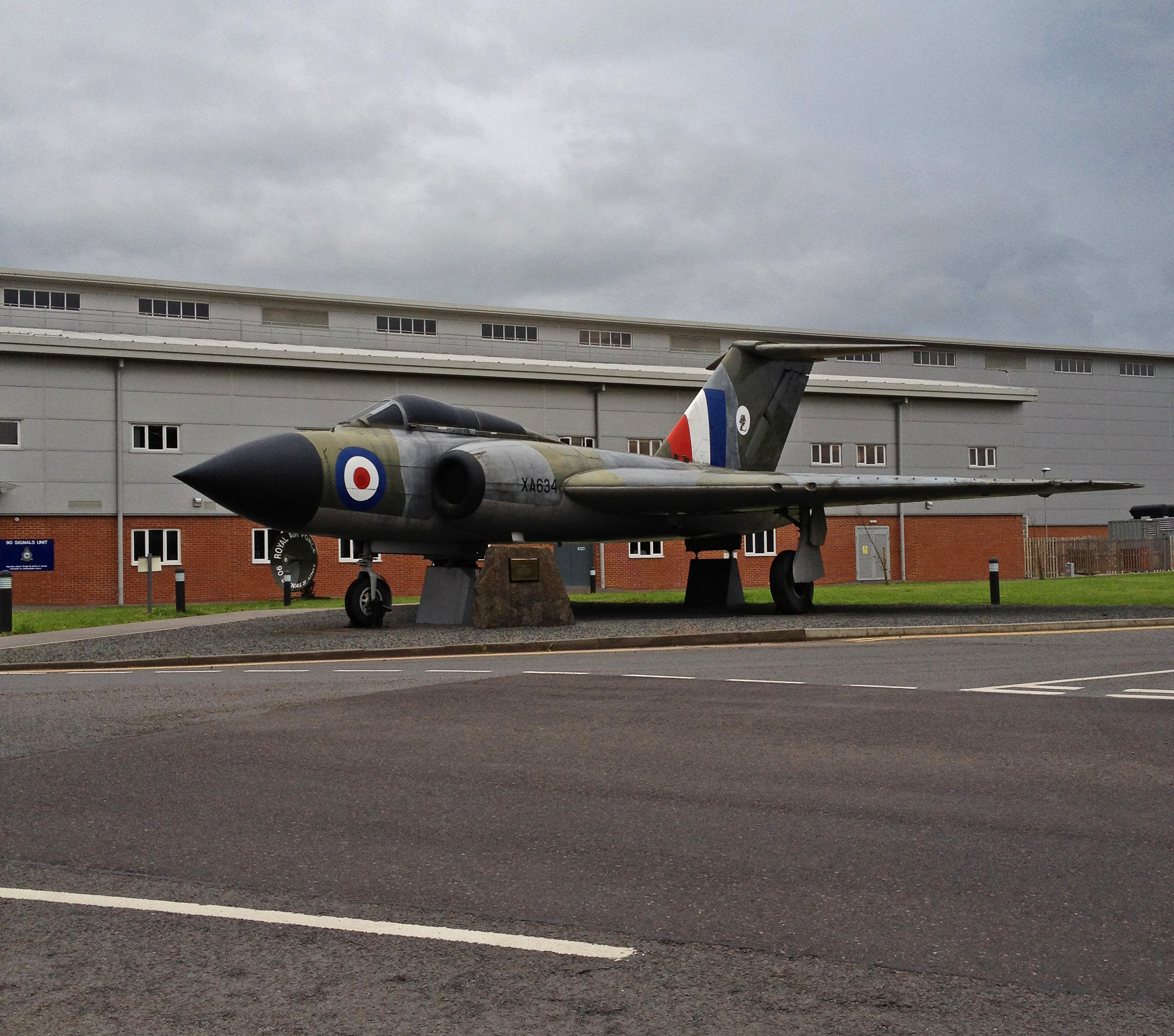
Gloster Javelin FAW.4, a type flown by No. 72 Squadron, 1959–61

The squadron was reformed on 1 February 1947 at RAF Odiham by renumbering No. 130 Squadron. They took over No. 130 Squadron's de Havilland Vampire F.1s, making no haste to remove that units 'AP' code. The Vampire soldiered on for three versions until it gave way to the Gloster Meteor F.8 in 1952, and when the squadron was given a night-fighter role in February 1956 these were replaced with Meteor NF.12s and Meteor NF.14s. In April 1959, the squadron got the all-weather fighter role and was given Gloster Javelin FAW.4s and later Javelin FAW.5s. These were flown until the squadron was disbanded at RAF Leconfield on 30 June 1961.

=== Helicopters ===
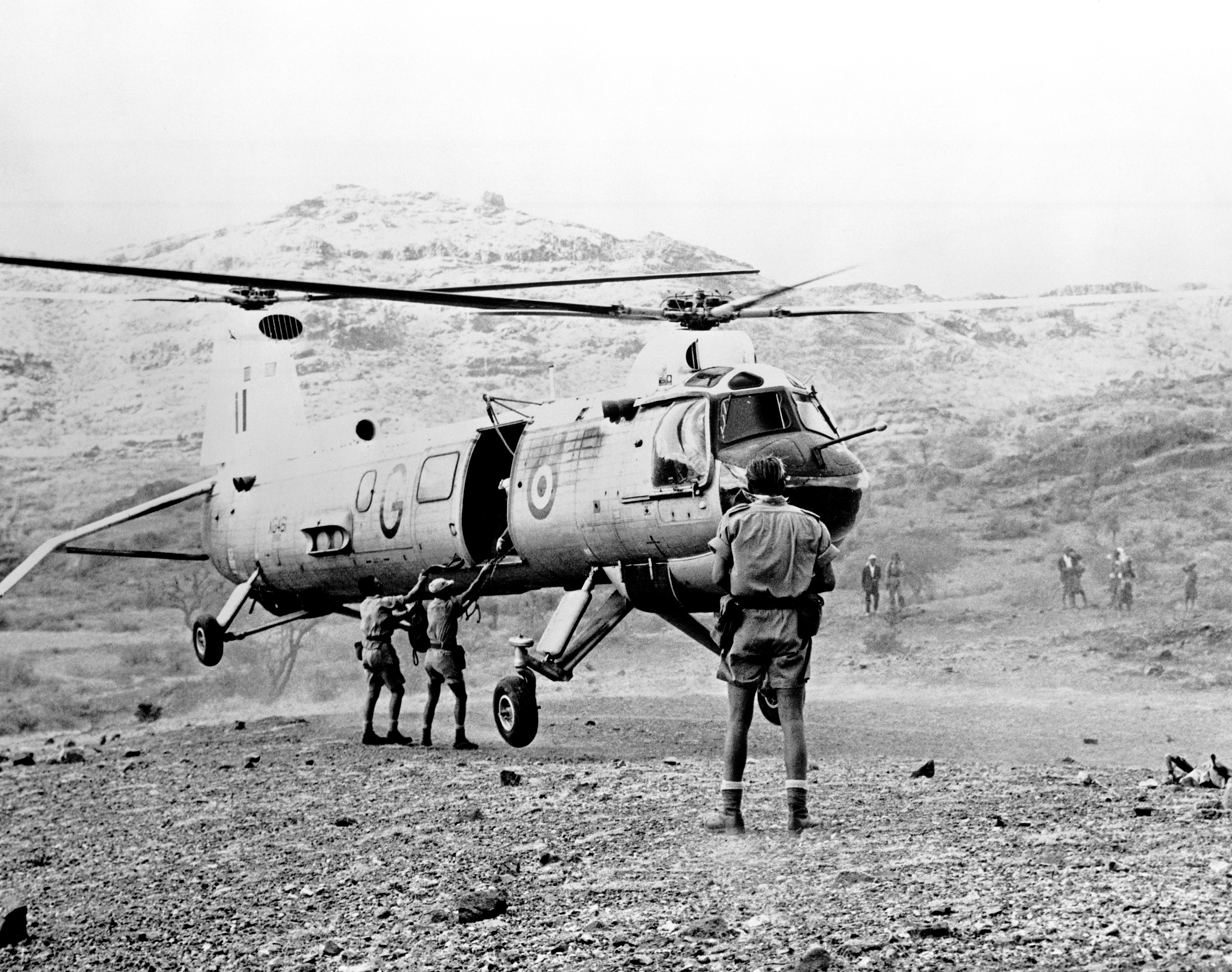
Bristol Belvedere HC.1, a type flown by No. 72 Squadron, 1961–64

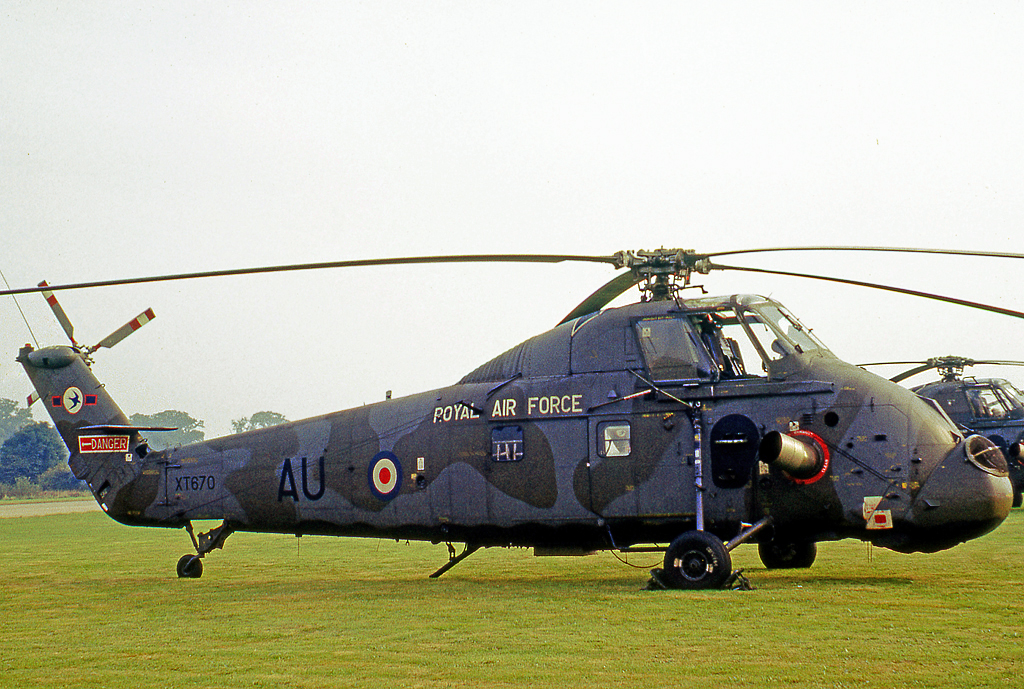
No. 72 Squadron Westland Wessex HC.2 based at RAF Odiham, in tactical camouflage, 1971

On 15 November 1961, No. 72 Squadron was reformed at RAF Odiham, but now as a helicopter unit. They were equipped with twin-rotor Bristol Belvederes HC.1s until the Westland Wessex HC.2 replaced these aircraft in August 1964. For the next thirty-eight years they continued to use these aircraft and in that time the squadron saw action in Malaya, provided post-disaster assistance following the Torrey Canyon tanker disaster in 1967 and supported the security forces in Northern Ireland from 1969. During the mid-1970s the squadron also operated a SAR 'D' flight at RAF Manston. From January 1997 the Wessex was partly supplanted with the more modern Westland Puma HC.1. The squadron's Wessex HC.2s departed RAF Aldergrove on 25 March 2002, shortly before their retirement. No. 72 Squadron was then disbanded on 1 April 2002 at Aldergrove.

=== Training – Tucano to Texan ===
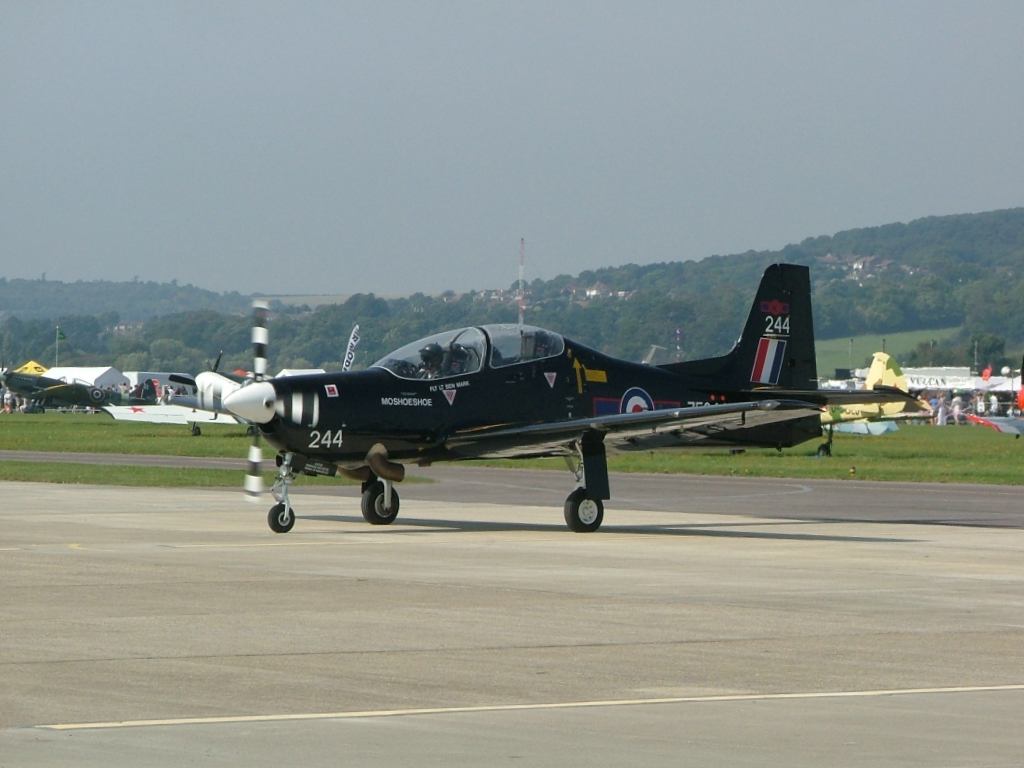
Short Tucano T.1 of No. 72 (Reserve) Squadron, 2005

On 12 July 2002, No. 1 Flying Training School divided its strength between two new reserve squadrons – No. 72 (Reserve) Squadron and No. 207 (Reserve) Squadron, with both units operating the Short Tucano T.1 at RAF Linton-on-Ouse, North Yorkshire. No. 72 (Reserve) Squadron became No. 72 Squadron after the (Reserve) suffix was rescinded across the RAF on 1 February 2018. The final Tucano Basic Fast-jet Training (BFJT) course graduated on 25 October 2019, which was marked with a nine-ship flypast over the local area. No. 72 Squadron disbanded on 31 October 2019.

On 28 November 2019, the squadron stood-up at RAF Valley operating the Beechcraft Texan T.1.

On 13 November 2020, No. 72 Squadron became No. 72 (Fighter) Squadron to reflect its former role as a fighter unit.

== Aircraft operated ==
Aircraft operated by No. 72 Squadron, data from
| From | To | Aircraft | Variant | Remark |
|---|---|---|---|---|
| March 1918 | June 1918 | Airco DH.4 | | 'A' flight |
| March 1918 | January 1919 | Spad S.7 | | 'A' flight |
| April 1918 | November 1918 | Martinsyde G.100 | | 'B' flight |
| April 1918 | February 1919 | Royal Aircraft Factory S.E.5 | S.E.5A | 'A' flight |
| April 1918 | February 1919 | Bristol M.1 | M.1c | 'C' flight |
| May 1937 | May 1939 | Gloster Gladiator | Mk.I | |
| April 1939 | April 1941 | Supermarine Spitfire | Mk.I | |
| May 1940 | May 1940 | Gloster Gladiator | Mks.I, II | Acklington unserviceable for Spitfires |
| April 1941 | July 1941 | Supermarine Spitfire | Mks.IIa, IIb | |
| July 1941 | July 1942 | Supermarine Spitfire | Mk.Vb | |
| July 1942 | February 1943 | Supermarine Spitfire | Mk.Vc | |
| July 1942 | August 1942 | Supermarine Spitfire | Mk.IX | |
| August 1942 | November 1942 | Supermarine Spitfire | Mk.Vb | |
| February 1943 | October 1944 | Supermarine Spitfire | Mk.IX | |
| June 1943 | January 1944 | Supermarine Spitfire | Mk. Vc | |
| October 1944 | December 1946 | Supermarine Spitfire | LF.Mk.IX | |
| February 1947 | October 1948 | de Havilland Vampire | F.1 | |
| June 1948 | February 1950 | de Havilland Vampire | F.3 | |
| November 1949 | July 1952 | de Havilland Vampire | FB.5 | |
| July 1952 | February 1956 | Gloster Meteor | F.8 | |
| February 1956 | June 1959 | Gloster Meteor | NF.12 | |
| February 1956 | June 1959 | Gloster Meteor | NF.14 | |
| April 1959 | June 1961 | Gloster Javelin | FAW.4 | |
| June 1959 | June 1961 | Gloster Javelin | FAW.5 | |
| November 1961 | August 1964 | Bristol Belvedere | HC.1 | |
| August 1964 | Easter 2002 | Westland Wessex | HC.2 | |
| January 1997 | Easter 2002 | Westland Puma | HC.1 | |
| July 2002 | October 2019 | Short Tucano | T1 | |
| November 2019 | present | Beechcraft Texan | T1 | |

== See also ==
- List of Royal Air Force aircraft squadrons
