= No. 26 Squadron RAF =

Defunct flying squadron of the Royal Air Force

- Squadron badge
- Active: 1915–1918 (RFC); 1918–1918; 1927–1946; 1946–1957; 1958–1960; 1962–1976
- Disbanded: 1 April 1976
- Country: United Kingdom
- Branch: Royal Air Force
- Type: Flying squadron
- Motto(s): N Wagter in die Lug (Afrikaans for 'A guard in the sky')

Insignia
- Roundel

No. 26 Squadron, also known as No. 26 (Army Co-operation) Squadron and for a period No. 26 (South Africa) Squadron, is a dormant squadron of the Royal Air Force. It was formed in 1915 and was disbanded for the last time on 1 April 1976.

== History ==
=== First World War (1915 to 1918) ===
No. 26 Squadron was formed at Netheravon in Wiltshire on 8 October 1915 from personnel of the South African Air Corps. It was equipped with the Royal Aircraft Factory B.E.2 and aircraft manufactured by Farman Aviation Works and sent to East Africa in 1915, arriving in Mombasa in the East Africa Protectorate at the end of January 1916. It was dispatched back to the UK in February 1918, where it was disbanded in July 1918.

=== Interwar period (1919–1938) ===
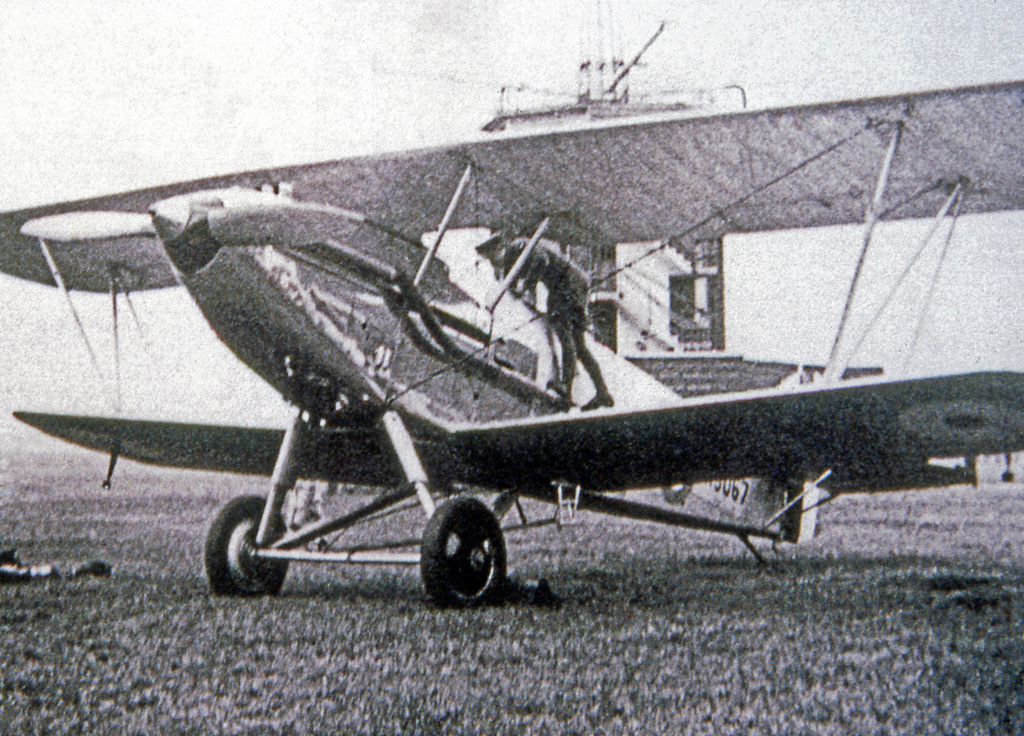
A Hawker Audax of No. 26 Squadron at Manchester Barton in 1934

On 11 October 1927, the squadron was reformed at RAF Catterick in Yorkshire as a single flight of Armstrong Whitworth Atlas army co-operation aircraft; on 1 September 1928 a second flight was added. In July 1933 the Hawker Audax was received, which were replaced by the Hawker Hector in August 1937.

=== Second World War (1939–1945) ===
By the outbreak of the Second World War, No. 26 Squadron had been equipped with the Westland Lysander and in October 1939 it moved to France. When the Germans invaded Belgium in May 1940, the squadron was forced to move to RAF Lympne in Kent, where it flew reconnaissance, bombing and supply missions over northern France. Coastal patrols began in June and training with the army occupied most of the squadron's time for the next few years.

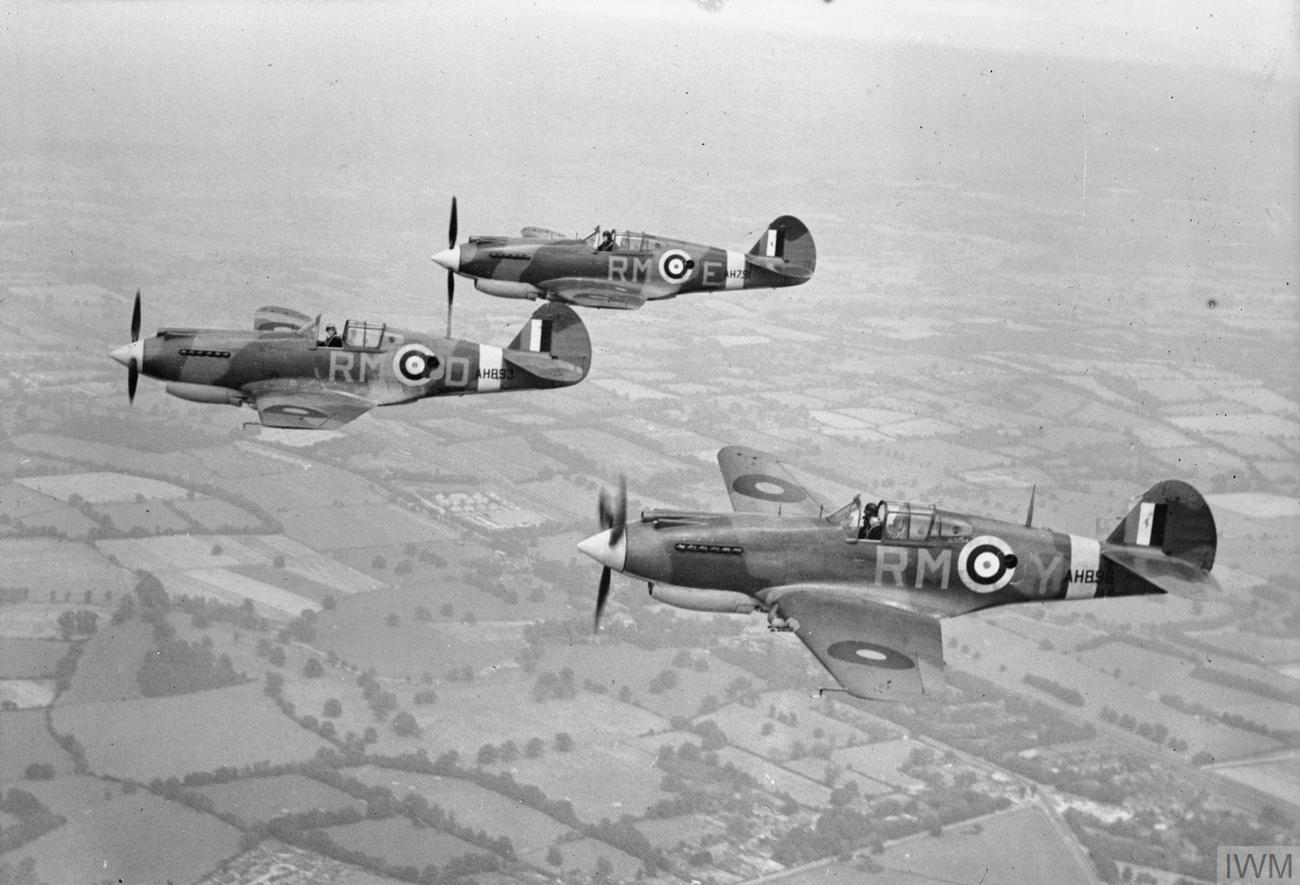
Curtis Tomahawks of No. 26 Squadron during the Second World War

In February 1941 Curtiss Tomahawks began to arrive to replace the Lysanders for tactical reconnaissance missions. In October 1941, the Tomahawks began to fly low-level ground attack sorties over northern France but they lacked the performance required for operations of this nature, so in January 1942 they were replaced by the North American Mustang. The tactical reconnaissance and day intruder missions continued until July 1943, when the squadron moved to Yorkshire and then in March 1944 to Scotland.

In preparation for the Normandy landings, the squadron trained in spotting naval guns, a task it carried out on and after D-Day. For this role the squadron was equipped with the Supermarine Spitfire although they reverted to the Mustang in December 1944 for reconnaissance missions over the Netherlands. In April 1945, the squadron spent two weeks spotting for French warships bombarding pockets of German resistance, before being transferred to Germany in August.

=== Cold War (1946–1976) ===
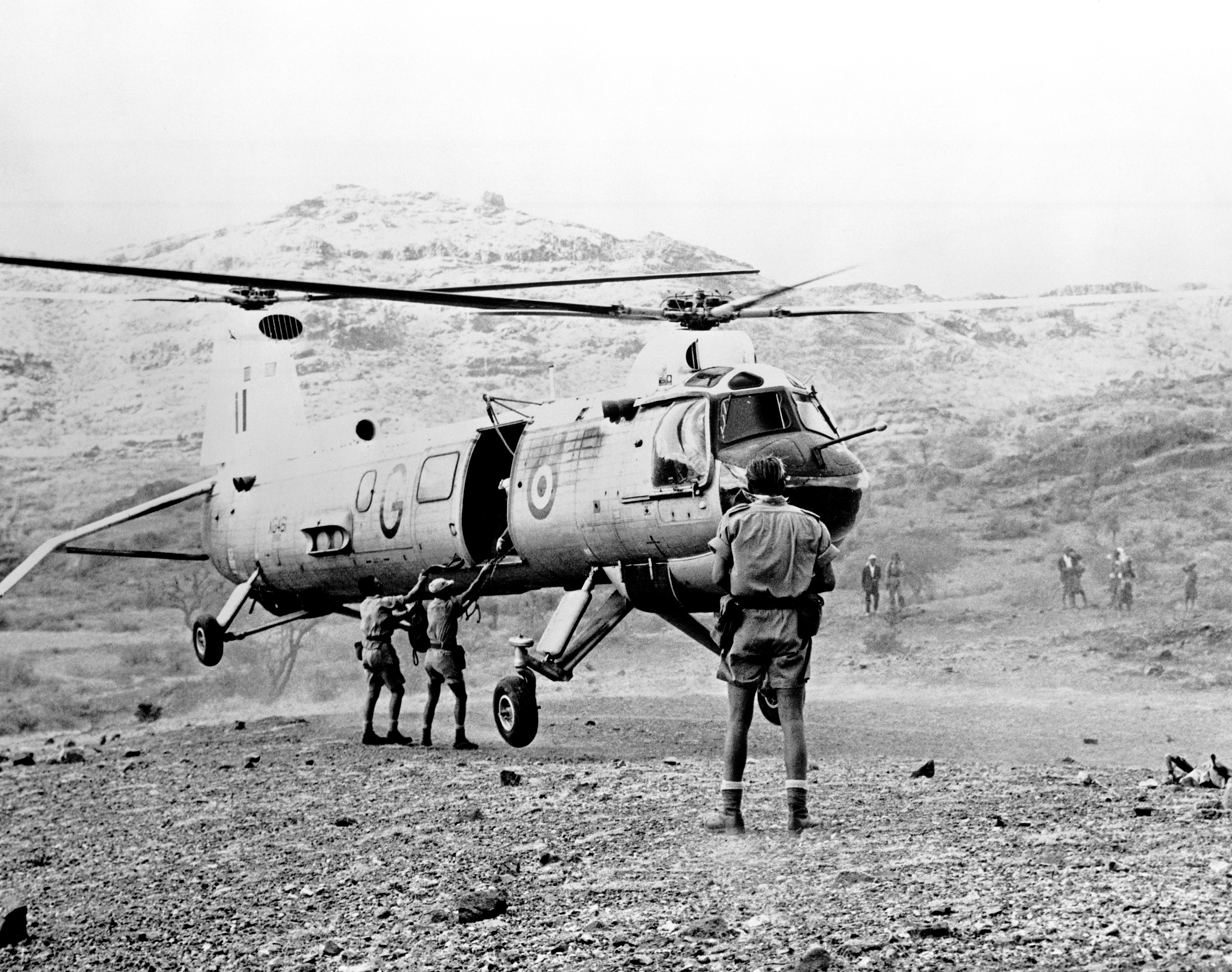
A Bristol Belvedere HC.1, operating from RAF Khormaksar, Aden

No. 26 Squadron remained in Germany until 1 April 1946 when it was disbanded. On the same day, No. 41 Squadron was renumbered as No. 26 Squadron at RAF Wunstorf in Lower Saxony and flew the Spitfire and Hawker Tempest until April 1949, when it was re-equipped with the de Havilland Vampire. In November 1953, now at nearby RAF Oldenburg, the squadron converted to the Canadair Sabre, converting again to the Hawker Hunter in July 1955, and remained a day-fighter unit until it was disbanded on 10 September 1957.

On 7 June 1958, the squadron reformed with Hawker Hunters, again in Germany, at RAF Gütersloh in North Rhine-Westphalia. It was disbanded on 30 December 1960.

The squadron reformed at RAF Odiham in Hampshire on 1 June 1962 and began flying the Bristol Belvedere HC.1 transport helicopter. An advance party was moved to Aden in March 1963 and the remainder to RAF Kuching, Borneo in November 1963 for a one-year unaccompanied tour. The aircraft remaining in RAF Khormaksar in 1965 went to Singapore on 30 November 1965, where they were merged with No. 66 Squadron, the ground crew going to No. 74 Squadron.

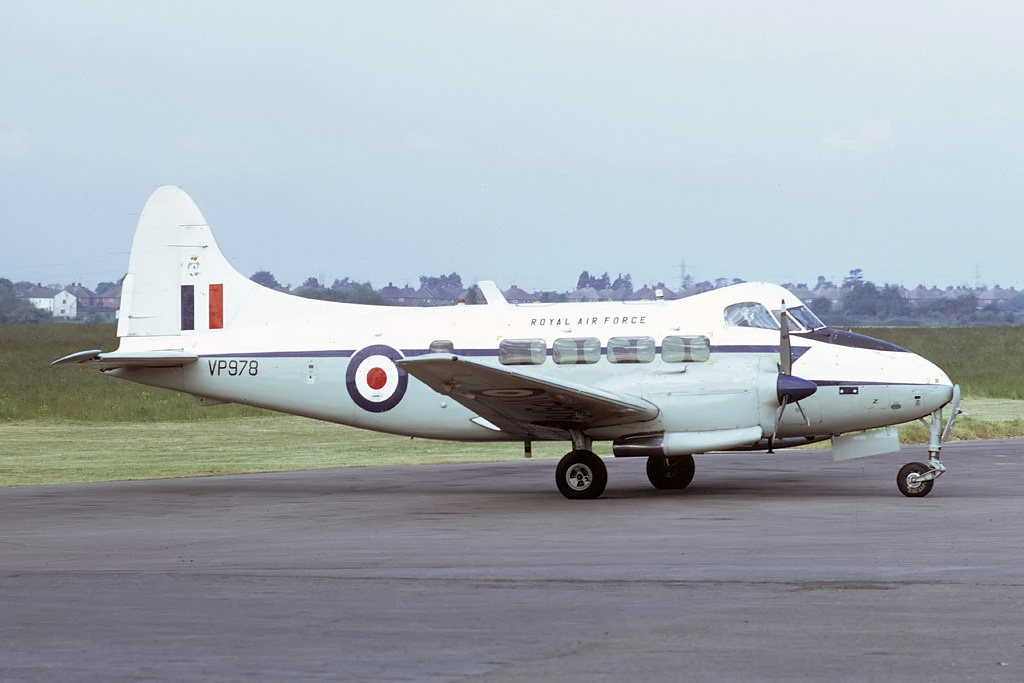
A de Havilland Devon C.2 of No. 26 Squadron at RAF Wyton in 1975

On 3 February 1969, the Training Command Communications Squadron (formerly the Northern Communications Squadron) based at RAF Wyton in Cambridgeshire was re-designated No. 26 Squadron. It was equipped with both the Beagle Basset and Percival Pembroke light transport aircraft, with the role of providing communication aircraft support to RAF Training Command.

The squadron discarded its Pembrokes in March 1971, receiving the de Havilland Devon in July that year. The squadron's Bassets were retired in May 1974, leaving it to continue on with the Devon until it was disbanded on 1 April 1976.

== Heritage ==
The squadron's badge features a springbok's head couped. The springbok is an antelope found mainly in south and southwest Africa, reflecting the time the squadron spent in Africa during its early years and that it initially comprised personnel of the South African Air Corps. The badge was approved in November 1936.

The squadron's motto is N Wagter in die Lug (Afrikaans for 'A guard in the sky').

== Battle honours ==
No. 26 Squadron has received the following battle honours. Those marked with an asterisk (*) may be emblazoned on the squadron standard.

- East Africa (1916–1918)
- France and Low Countries (1939–1940)
- Dunkirk
- Fortress Europe (1940–1944)
- Dieppe
- France & Germany (1944–1945)
- Normandy (1944)
- Walcheren

== See also ==
- List of Royal Air Force aircraft squadrons
