= List of aircraft at the Royal Air Force Museum Midlands =

This list of aircraft at the Royal Air Force Museum Midlands summarises the collection of aircraft that is housed at the Royal Air Force Museum Midlands, located at RAF Cosford in Shropshire.

== Collection ==
=== External display ===
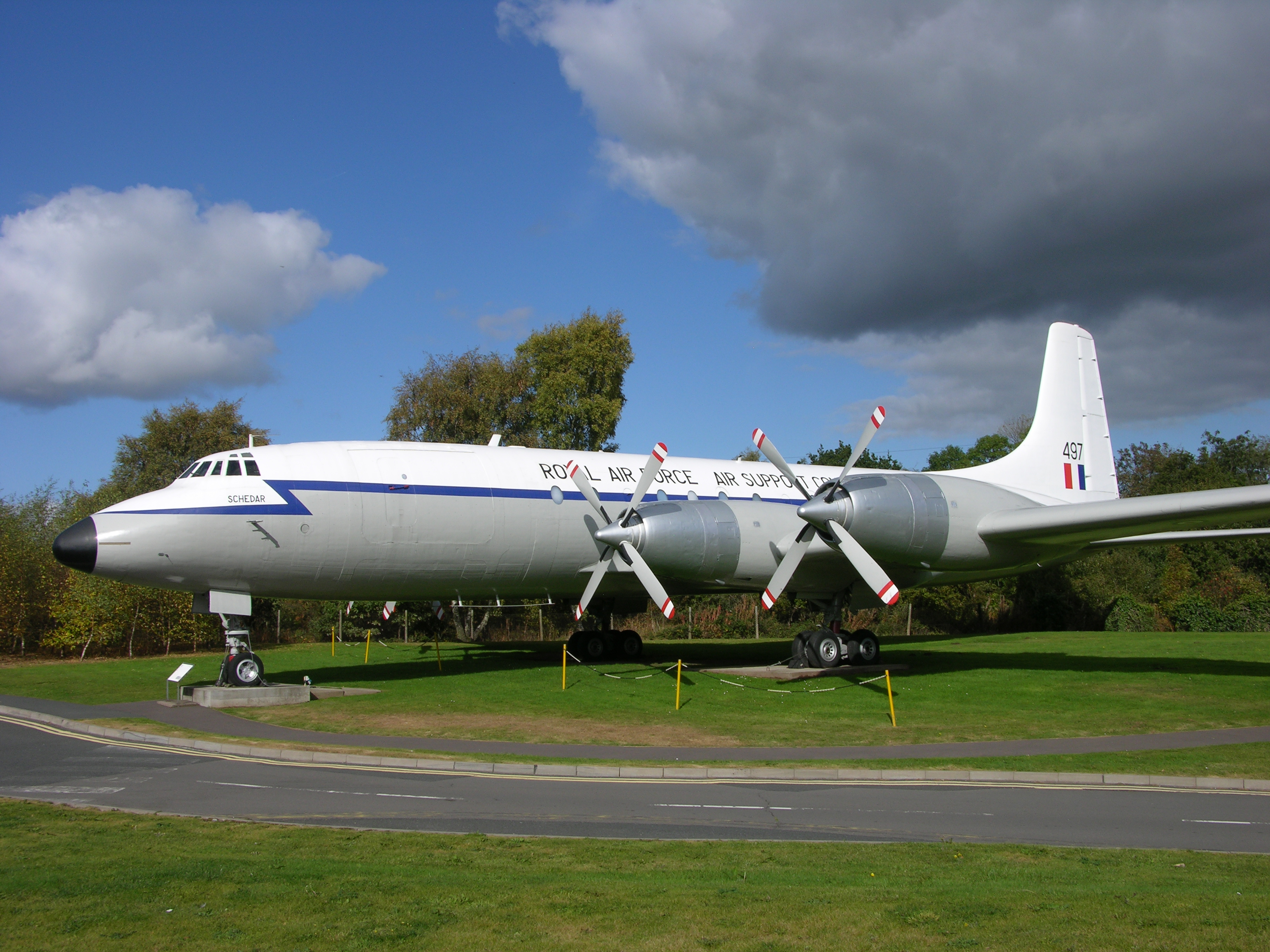
Bristol Britannia on external display

As of June 2026, the following aircraft are on display in the grounds of the museum:

Type	Identity	Markings	Notes
Bristol Britannia 312	G-AOVF		Former civil aircraft registered G-AOVF, never operated by RAF; sold to the museum and delivered by air in 1984; repainted in 2007 to represent retired RAF Britannia XM497, named Schedar, of Royal Air Force Air Support Command
Consolidated PBY-6A Catalina	L-866		ex-Royal Danish Air Force, sold to the RAF Museum for a token amount 1972; overhauled then presented to the museum following delivery flight from Denmark to RAF Colerne in 1974, delivered to Cosford by road 1976
Hawker Siddeley Andover E.3A	XS639		ex-No. 32 Squadron RAF, delivered by air from RAF Northolt to the museum in 1994
Hawker Siddeley Dominie T.1	XS709	Fin Code "M"	ex-No. 3 Flying Training School RAF, delivered by air from RAF Cranwell to the museum in 2011
Hawker Siddeley Nimrod R.1	XV249		ex-No. 51 Squadron RAF, flown from RAF Waddington to Cotswold Airport in 2011; dismantled and delivered to Cosford by road 2012
Lockheed C-130K Hercules C.3	XV202		ex-No. 47 Squadron RAF, delivered by air from RAF Brize Norton to the museum in 2011

=== Hangar Two ===
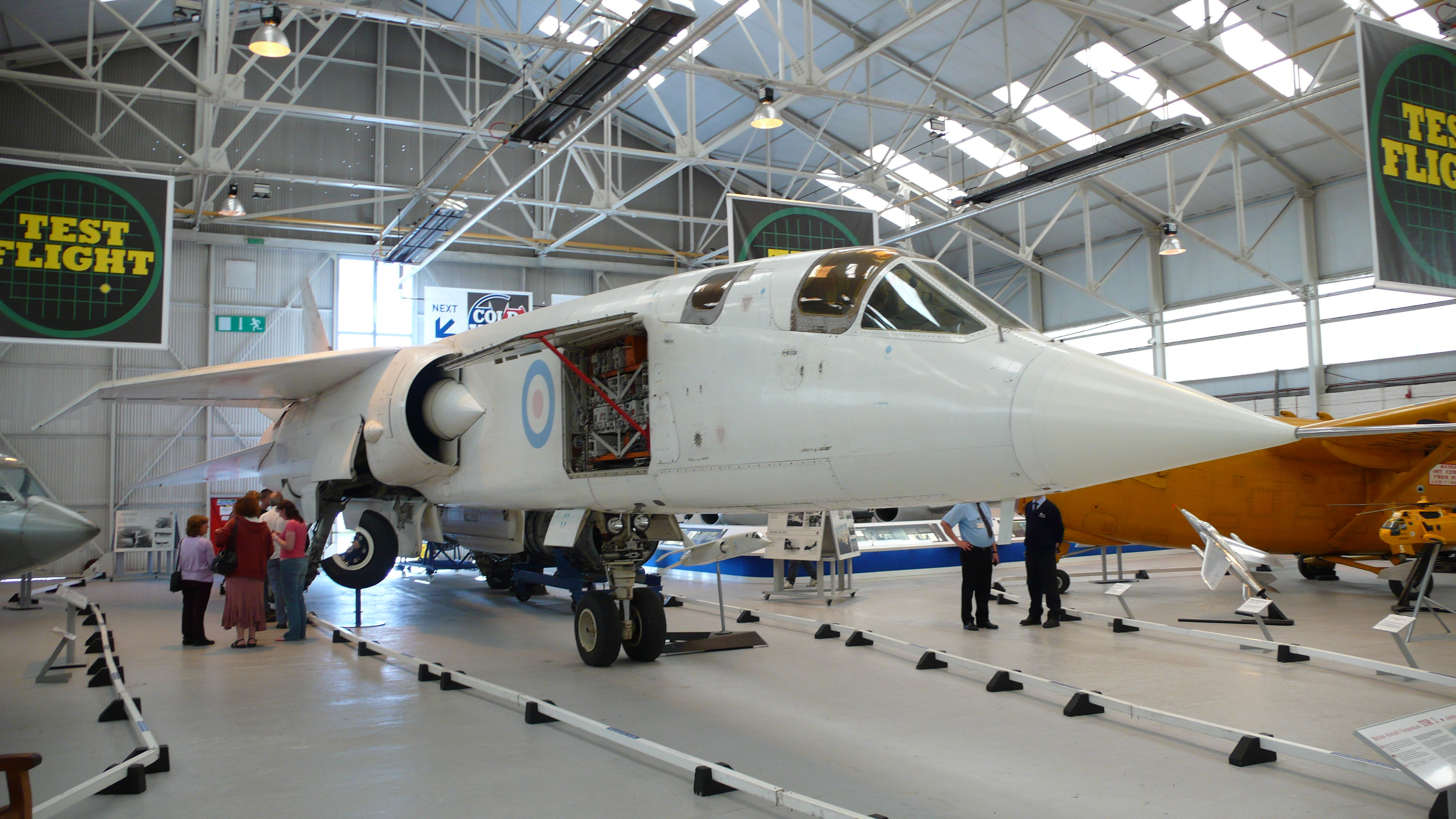
The BAC TSR-2 on display in the Test Flight hangar

Hangar Two houses the Test Flight exhibition.

Type	Identity	Markings	Notes
BAC TSR-2	XR220		One of two complete airframes remaining
Boulton Paul Defiant I	N1671	EW-D	No. 307 (Polish) Squadron RAF
Bristol M.1c replica	C4994		No. 150 Squadron RAF
British Aerospace EAP	ZF534	EAP	Experimental Aircraft Programme, BAe
Fairey Delta 2	WG777	Fairey Delta	A&AEE
Gloster Gladiator I	K8042		No. 247 Squadron RAF
Hawker Afghan Hind	n/a		
Hawker Hart II Trainer	K4972		No. 2 Flying Training School RAF at RAF Brize Norton
Hawker Hurricane IIc	LF738	UH-A	
Hawker Siddeley Kestrel F(GA).1	XS695	5	RAE Bedford
Messerschmitt Bf 109G-2/Trop	10639	Black 6	Luftwaffe in North Africa
Miles M.14A Hawk Trainer 3	T9967		
SEPECAT Jaguar ACT	XX765	ACT	Active Control Technology
Sopwith Pup	N5182		Royal Naval Air Service
Sopwith 1½ Strutter Replica	A8226		No. 45 Squadron RFC
Supermarine Spitfire I	K9942	SD-D	No. 52 Operational Training Unit RAF

=== Hangar Three ===
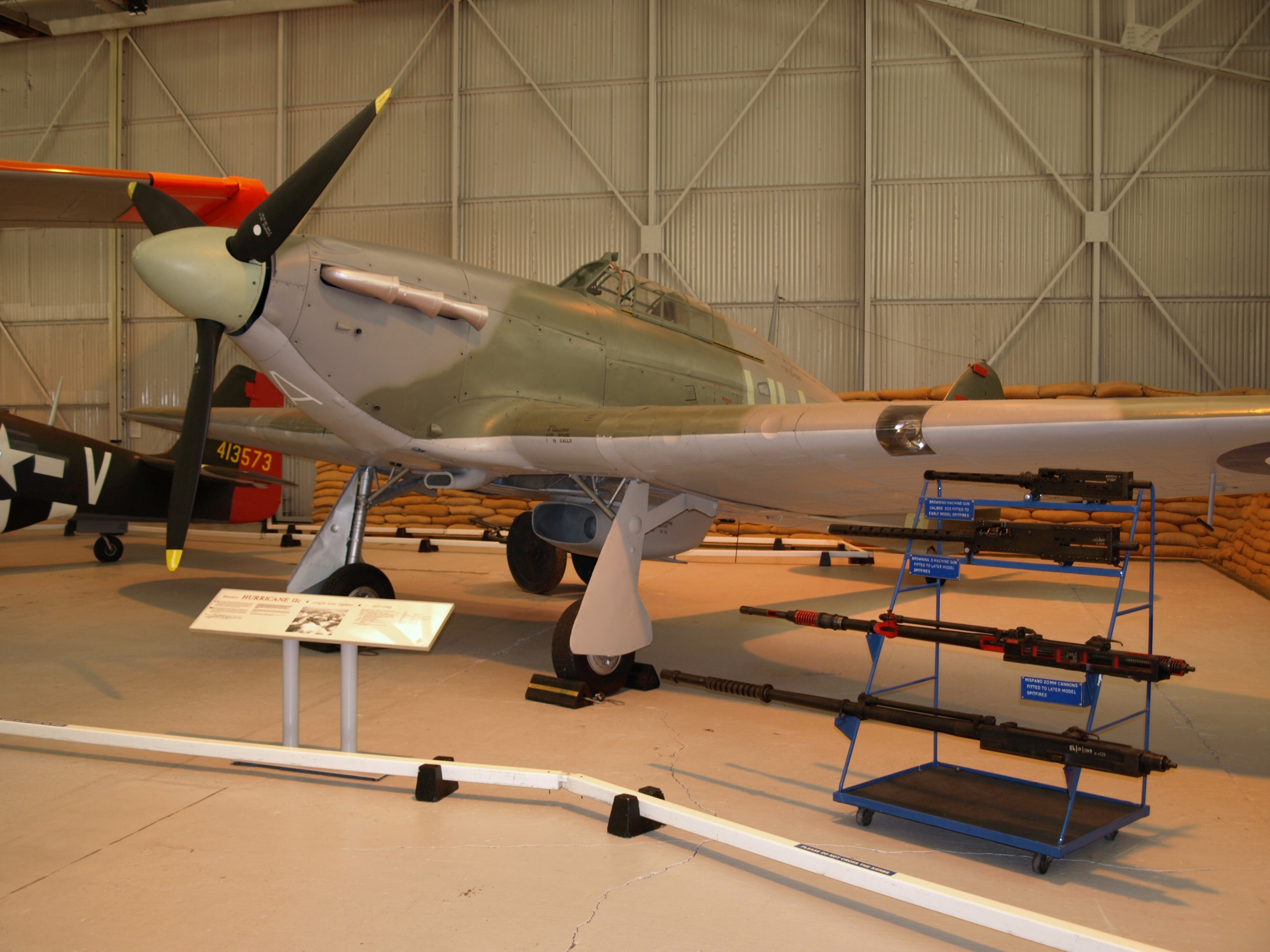
A Hawker Hurricane II on display in the War in the Air hangar. A selection of armament used by the type is also displayed.

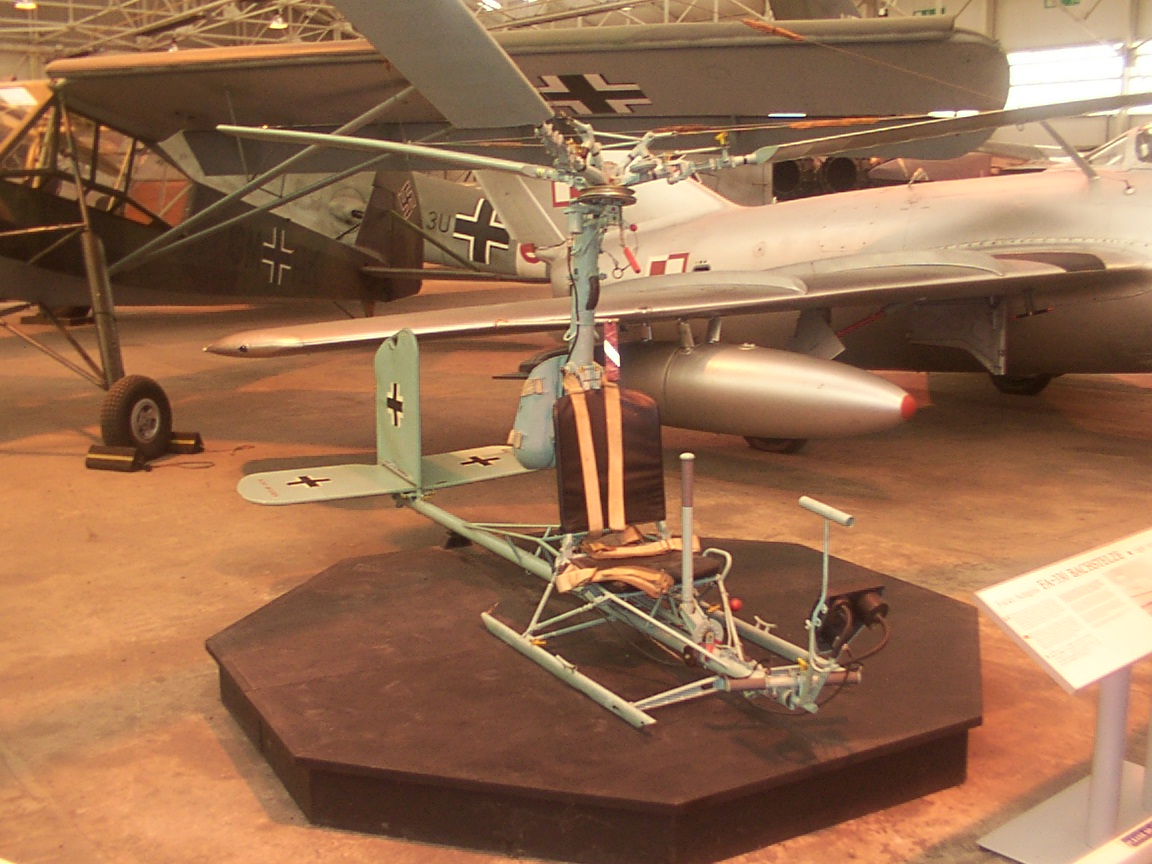
Focke Achgelis FA330

Hangar Three houses the Bomber Command exhibition and the War in the Air exhibition.

Type	Identity	Markings	Notes
Avro Lincoln B.2/4A	RF398		No. 151 Squadron RAF at RAF Watton
Bristol Bolingbroke IV	L8756	XD-E	Restored as a Bristol Blenheim
de Havilland Mosquito TT.35	TA639	AZ-E	No. 3 Civilian Anti-Aircraft Co-operation Unit RAF; Unit markings of Guy Gibson's last flight in a Mosquito XX on 19 September 1944
de Havilland Tiger Moth II	T6296		
Fairchild Argus II	FS628		Former civil G-AIZE
Fieseler Fi 156-C7 Storch	VP746	SM + AK	Luftwaffe
Focke-Wulf Fw 190 A-8/R6	733682		Luftwaffe "Mistel" combination aircraft. Captured in Denmark, May 1945.
Hawker Tempest II	PR536	OQ-H	Indian Air Force and RAF
Junkers Ju 88R-1	360043	EV	Luftwaffe - One of only two intact Ju-88s, captured with pilot Herbert Schmid, when he landed at Aberdeen on 9 May 1943, allowing nightfighter radar to be studied.
Messerschmitt Me 262A-2A	VK893	Yellow 4	Luftwaffe
Messerschmitt Me 410A-1/U2	420430	3U+CC	Luftwaffe
Short Stirling III	LK488	QQ-E	Recovered Fuselage Section
Vickers Wellington X	MF628		

=== Hangar Four ===
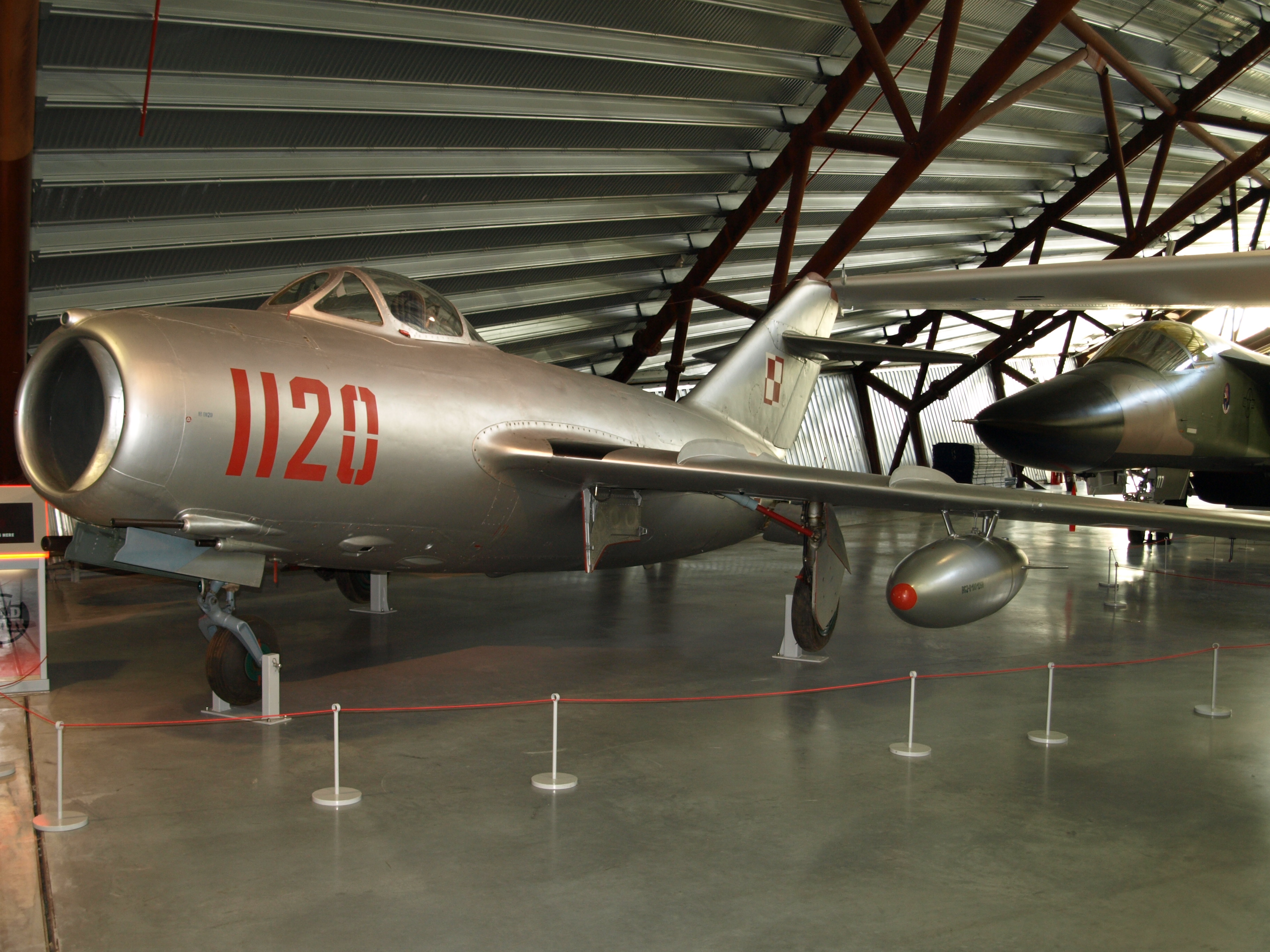
The Mikoyan MiG-15bis on display in the National Cold War Exhibition

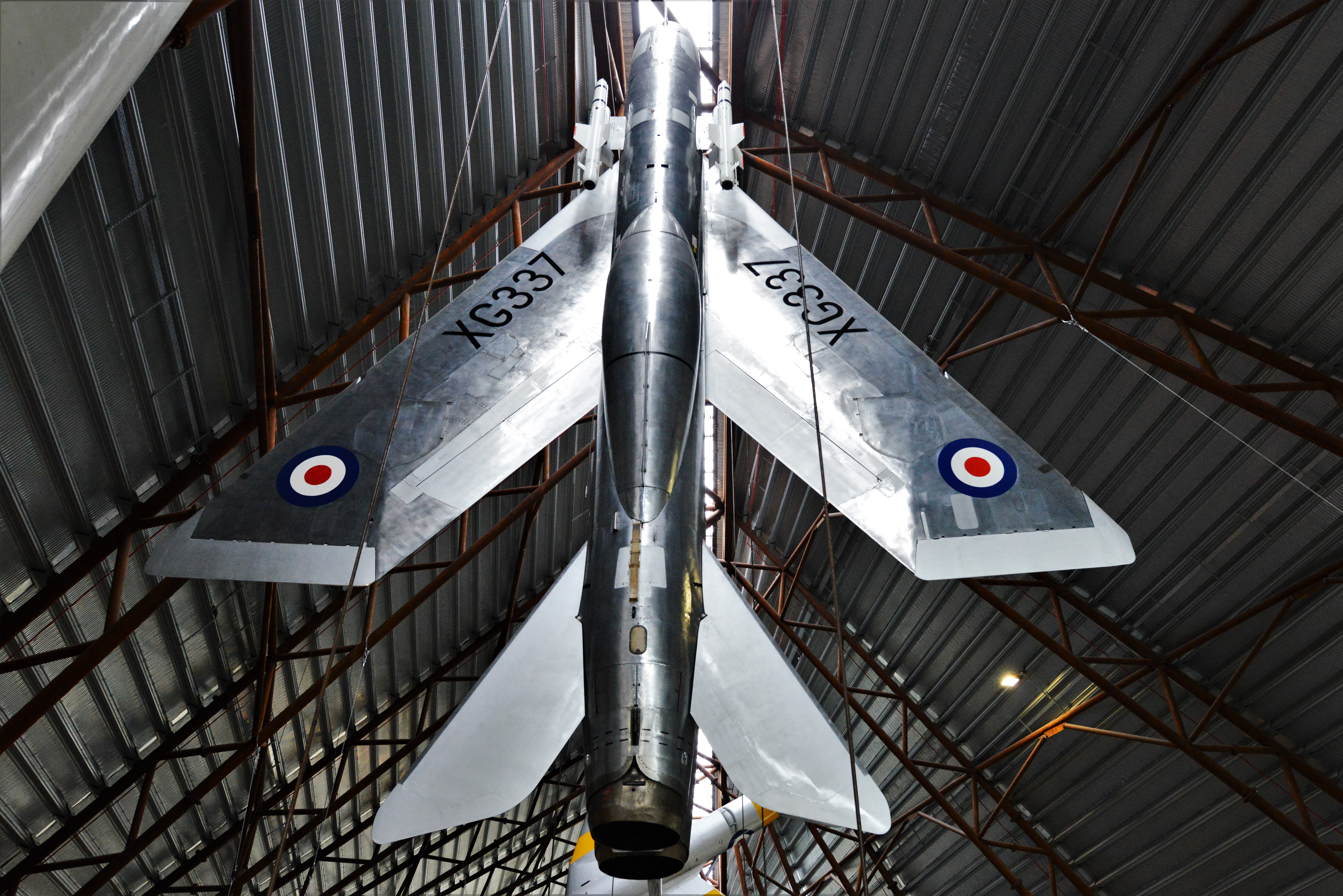
Electric Lightning F.1 serial XG337 on display

Hangar Four houses the National Cold War Exhibition.

Type	Identity	Markings	Notes
Armstrong Whitworth Argosy T.1	XP411	8442M	No. 6 Flying Training School RAF at RAF Finningley
Armstrong Whitworth Meteor NF.14	WS843	J	No. 264 Squadron RAF
Avro York C.1	TS798		
Canadair Sabre F.4	XB812		No. 93 Squadron RAF
Douglas Dakota C.4	KN645		RAF Transport Command
English Electric Canberra PR.9	XH171	U	No. 39 Squadron RAF
English Electric Lightning F.1/P.1B	XG337		
General Dynamics F-111F	74-0177	LN	United States Air Force - 492d Fighter Squadron, RAF Lakenheath
Gloster Javelin FAW.1	XA564		
Handley Page Hastings T.5	TG511		
Handley Page Victor K.2	XH672	"Maid Marion"	No. 55 Squadron RAF
Hawker Hunter T.7A	XL568		No. 74 Squadron RAF
Hawker Siddeley Vulcan B.2	XM598		No. 44 Squadron RAF; Operation Black Buck / Falklands War reserve aircraft.
Mikoyan MiG-15bis	1120		Polish Air Force
Mikoyan MiG-21PF	503		Hungarian Air Force
Percival Provost T.1	WV562	P-C	No. 1 Flying Training School RAF at RAF Syerston
Short Belfast C.1	XR371	"Enceladus"	No. 53 Squadron RAF
Sikorsky MH-53J Pave Low III	68-8284		United States Air Force
Vickers Valiant B.1	XD818		No. 49 Squadron RAF - Dropped Britain's first hydrogen bomb during Operation Grapple tests in 1957.
Westland Whirlwind HAR.10	XP299		

=== Planned disposals ===
In March 2025 the RAF Museum announced plans to transfer a number of aircraft stored at Midlands that were not regarded as aligned with its core mission "to share the story of the Royal Air Force—past, present, and future—through its people, aircraft, and innovations." The aircraft available for transfer were:

- Boulton Paul Sea Balliol
- De Havilland Chipmunk
- De Havilland Comet 1XB, transferred to the South Wales Aviation Museum in September 2025
- De Havilland Devon
- Fairchild Argus
- Fairey Swordfish
- Fieseler Fi 156 Storch
- FMA IA 58 Pucará
- Hunting Percival Jet Provost T1
- Lockheed Ventura
- Vickers Valetta
- Vickers Varsity T Mk I

== See also ==
- Royal Air Force Museum London
  - List of aircraft at the Royal Air Force Museum London
