= Bristol Belvedere =

1950s British military helicopter

Type 192 Belvedere
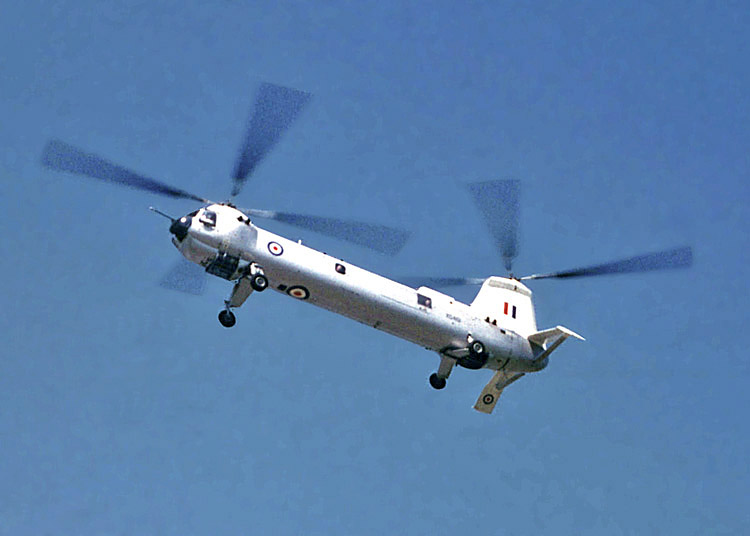
- The Bristol Type 192 Belvedere tandem rotor helicopter

General information
- Type: Cargo helicopter
- Manufacturer: Bristol Aeroplane Company
- Primary user: Royal Air Force
- Number built: 26

History
- Introduction date: 1961
- First flight: 5 July 1958
- Retired: 1969
- Developed from: Bristol Type 173

The Bristol Type 192 Belvedere is a British twin-engine, tandem rotor military helicopter built by the Bristol Aeroplane Company. It was Britain's only tandem rotor helicopter to enter production, and one of the few not built by Piasecki/Vertol, or its successor, Boeing Vertol/Boeing Rotorcraft Systems.

The Belvedere was designed during the late 1950s as a derivative of the abortive Bristol Type 173. Although the type was solely procured by the Royal Air Force (RAF), its design had been heavily shaped by earlier work performed for the Royal Navy, which resulted in its unusually tall forward undercarriage that somewhat complicated cabin entrance/egress. The two rotors were synchronised, which permitted flight with only a single operational engine if required. The controls and instrumentation was designed to be compatible with night time operations. While the initial prototype, which performed its maiden flight on 5 July 1958, were equipped with wooden rotor blades, production units were fitted with metal counterparts instead.

Introduced to service during 1961, the Belvedere HC Mark 1 was operated by the RAF to perform various logistical duties, including troop transport, supply dropping and casualty evacuation. While Initially based at RAF Odiham, the Belvedere saw service in various locations around the globe, including Europe, Africa, Southern Arabia and Singapore. It was deployed for active combat operations during both the Aden Emergency and Borneo (amid the Indonesia–Malaysia confrontation). The Belvedere was withdrawn in 1969, being effectively replaced by the Westland Wessex. Efforts to market the type to other customers, including the civilian-oriented Type 192C, did not lead to further production runs.

== Design and development ==
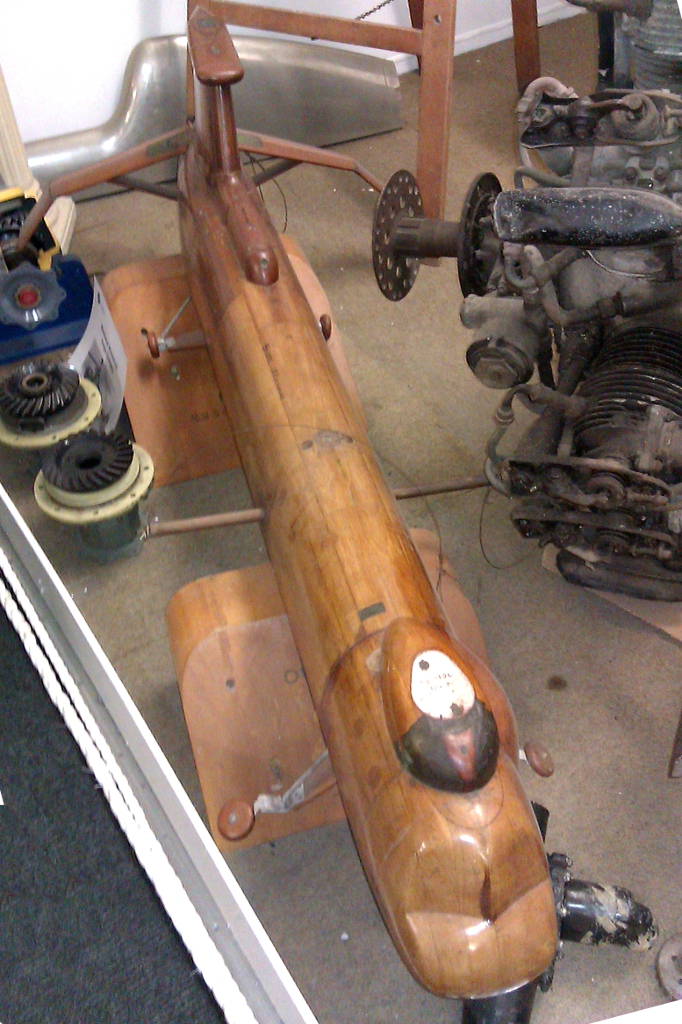
Wind tunnel model

The Belvedere was based on the Bristol Type 173 10-seat (later 16-seat) civilian helicopter which first flew on 3 January 1952. The Type 173 project was cancelled in 1956, and Bristol opted to allocate resources to the related Type 191 and Type 193, which were designed around Royal Navy and Royal Canadian Navy specifications. While these two naval variants were both ultimately cancelled as well, the Royal Air Force (RAF) expressed an interest in the aircraft, leading to the creation of the Type 192 "Belvedere". Three Type 191 airframes were almost complete when the order was cancelled, but they were reused to aid the development of the Type 192. Specifically, the first two were used as test rigs for the new Napier Gazelle turboshaft engines while the third was used for fatigue tests.

The Type 192 shared numerous design features with the cancelled naval variants, which made it less than ideal for the troop transport mission. The forward undercarriage was untypically tall, originally designed to give adequate clearance for the loading of torpedoes underneath the fuselage in the anti-submarine warfare role; this configuration resulted in both the main passenger and cargo door being 4 feet (1.2 m) above the ground. The engines were placed at either end of the cabin. (By comparison, the contemporary purpose-designed troop transport Boeing Vertol CH-46 Sea Knight had its engines above the aft cabin to permit a rear loading ramp). To provide access to the cabin from the cockpit, there was a small entry past the engine that resulted in a bulge on the left side of the fuselage.

On 5 July 1958, the first Type 192 prototype XG447 made its maiden flight; it was equipped with tandem wooden rotor blades, a completely manual control system and a castored, fixed quadricycle undercarriage. Starting with the fifth prototype, the rotors fitted were all-metal, four-bladed units. Production model controls and instruments permitted night operations. The prototype Belvederes featured an upwards-hinged main passenger and cockpit door, which was prone to being slammed shut by the downwash from the rotors; this arrangement was replaced by a sliding door on the later-build rotorcraft. The type was capable of carrying up to 18 fully equipped troops with a total load capacity of 6,000 lb (2,700 kg). The two rotors were synchronised through a shaft to prevent blade collision, which allowed the rotorcraft to remain operational with only one working engine in the event of an emergency. In such a scenario, the remaining engine would automatically run up to double power to compensate.

Procurement of the Belvedere was subject to considerable political factors; while the Air Ministry was keen to maintain the order and to support indigenous helicopter development, the HM Treasury urged for production to be curtailed in favour of the Westland Wessex, a licence-produced helicopter. A total of 26 Belvederes were produced, which entered service as the Belvedere HC Mark 1. The name Belvedere was connected to the rotorcraft's lead designer, Raoul Hafner, who named it after a Baroque palace in his home city of Vienna.

For a time, Bristol actively marketed a civilian variant of the helicopter, designated the Type 192C. Aimed at intercity services, the Type 192C would have had seats for 24 passengers. To demonstrate the aircraft's potential, Bristol chief test pilot Charles "Sox" Hosegood set the London–Paris and Paris–London speed records in May 1961 while flying a Belvedere. However, no orders were ever secured for the Type 192C.

== Operational history ==
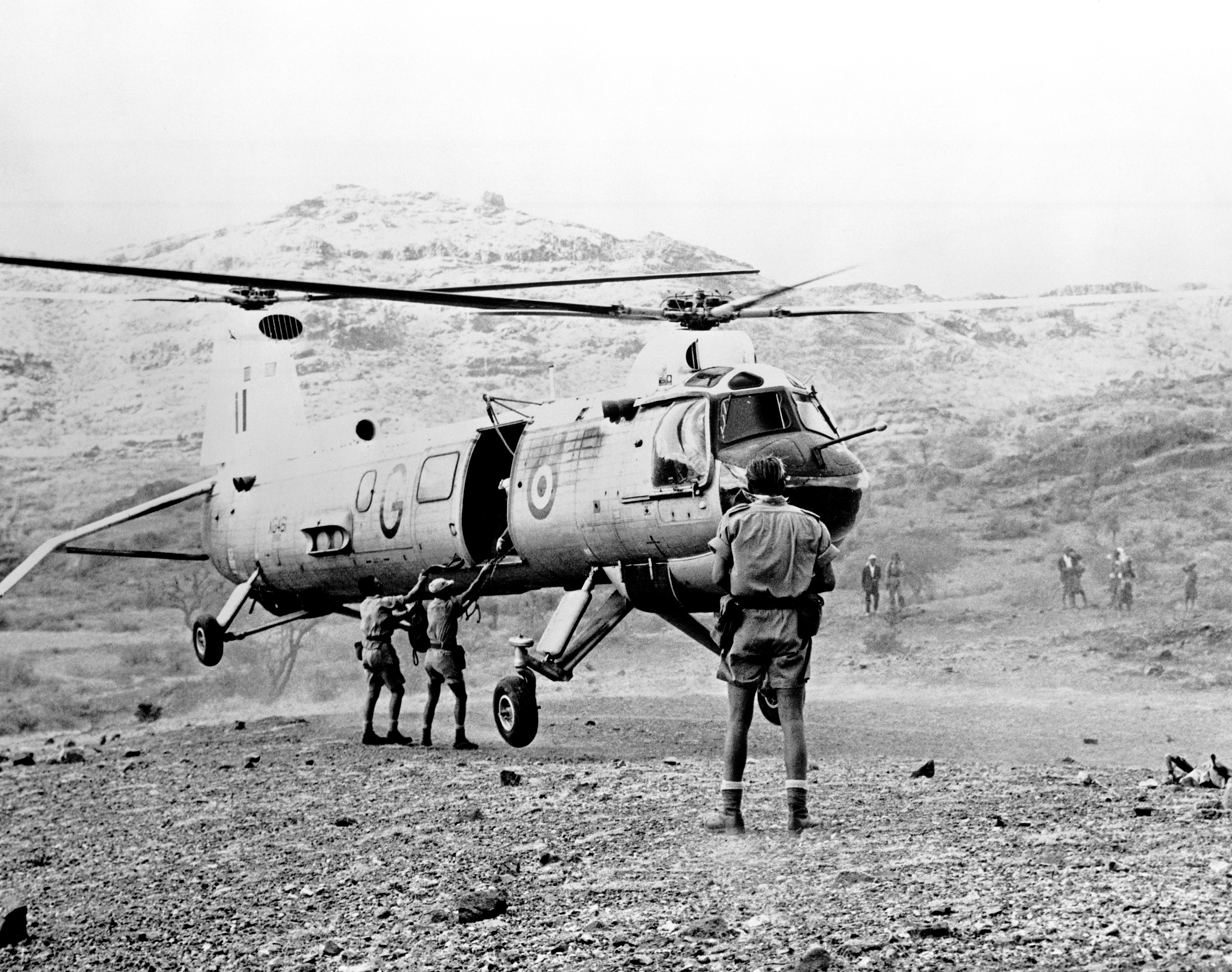
A Belvedere HC.1 of No. 26 Squadron in Aden, circa 1964

Three pre-production Belvederes (XG453, 454, 456) were delivered to the Belvedere Trials Unit at RAF Odiham, which was subsequently reformed as No. 66 Squadron in 1961. Early on, the type was able to demonstrate its capabilities. In June 1960, the fifth prototype, XG452, set a speed record of 130 mph (210 km/h) between Gatwick and Tripoli, Libya. Two years later, a Belvedere of No. 72 Squadron lowered the 80 ft tall spire onto the new Coventry Cathedral. Early on, the engine starter proved to be troublesome, however this issue did not obstruct operational deployment. The original prototype XG447 was broken up at Porton Down on 7 August 1966.

While initially adopted by No. 66 Squadron, the type was also allocated to No. 72 Squadron in 1961 and No. 26 Squadron in 1962, all of which were initially based at Odiham. During 1962, the Belvedere was deployed to RAF Seletar, Singapore as the unit's second aircraft. While based in this region, the type typically performed troop transport and supply activities, as well as air-sea rescue and casualty evacuation (CASEVAC) duties throughout Malaysia.

In response to the Brunei revolt of December 1962, Belvederes were deployed to the region, where they supported patrols by Royal Marine and SAS troops; in one instance, the type was used to recover a damaged Westland Whirlwind helicopter. In early 1963, several Belvederes were active in Borneo to support flood relief operations. Later that same year, the type was present in Borneo as part of a wider deterrence force during the Indonesia–Malaysia confrontation, where it performed aerial reconnaissance and CASEVAC missions.

During 1964, additional Belvederes transferred to RAF Khormaksar, Yemen, in response to the Aden Emergency. In this theatre, it was commonly used to deliver supplies to forward troop positions, reposition 105 mm artillery pieces and provide CASEVAC support. During the Yemen deployment, the fine sand proved to be a particular source of trouble for the Belvedere, necessitating more frequent engine changes; furthermore, the engine starting system was also attributed with causing several minor fires.

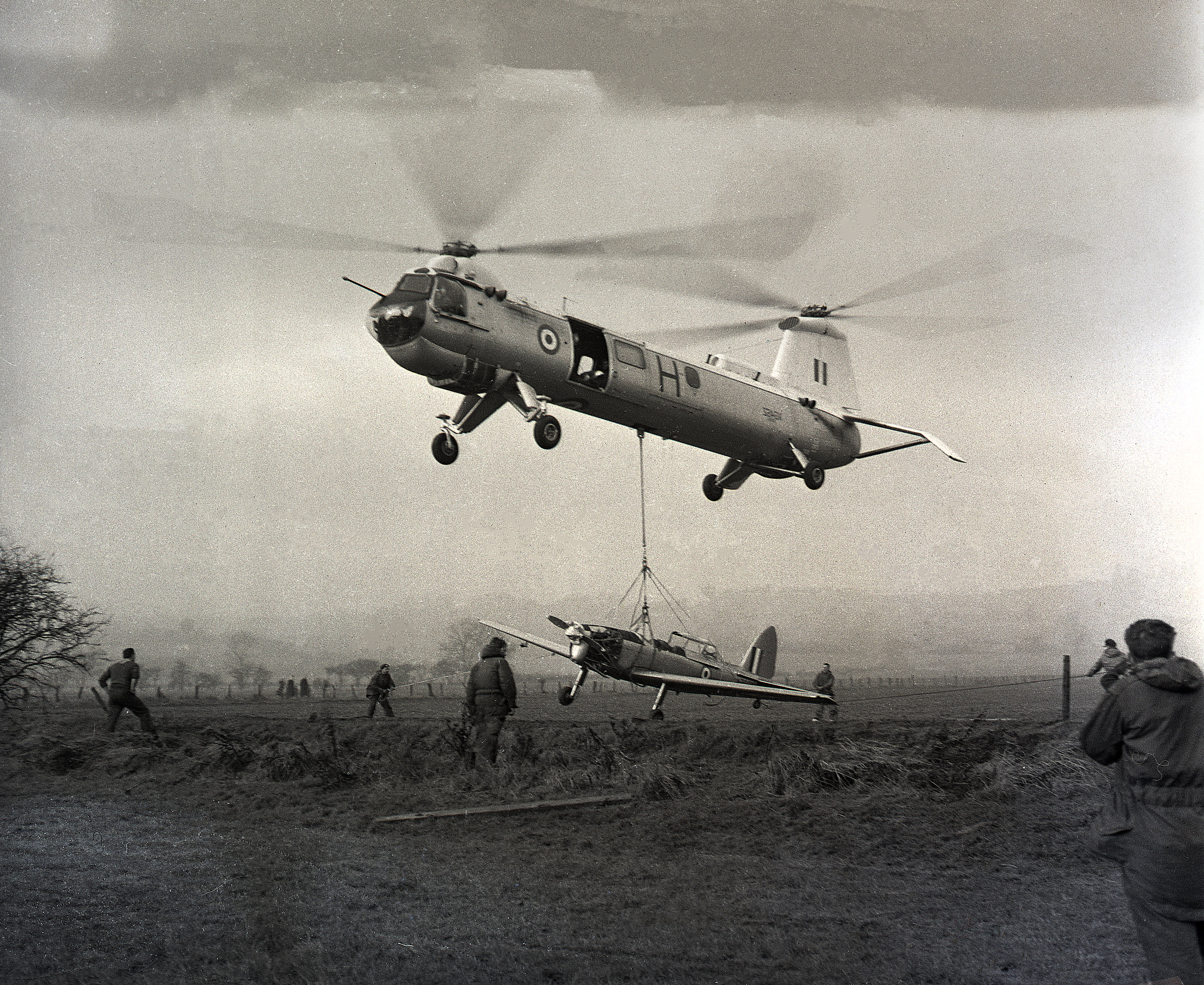
A Belvedere rescuing a crashed de Havilland Canada DHC-1 Chipmunk, North Yorkshire, 1965

During August 1967, a Belvedere assisted in the airlift of radar equipment to Western Hill, Penang.

The Belvedere had a relatively short operating life. In August 1964, No. 72 Squadron exchanged its Belvederes for the Westland Wessex. No. 26 Squadron was based in RAF Khormaksar, Yemen, when its was disbanded in November 1965; its Belvederes were transferred by HMS Albion to Singapore to join No. 66 Squadron. No. 66 Squadron was the last to operate the type, and thus the last Belvederes with withdrawn from active service when this squadron was disbanded in March 1969.

== Variants ==
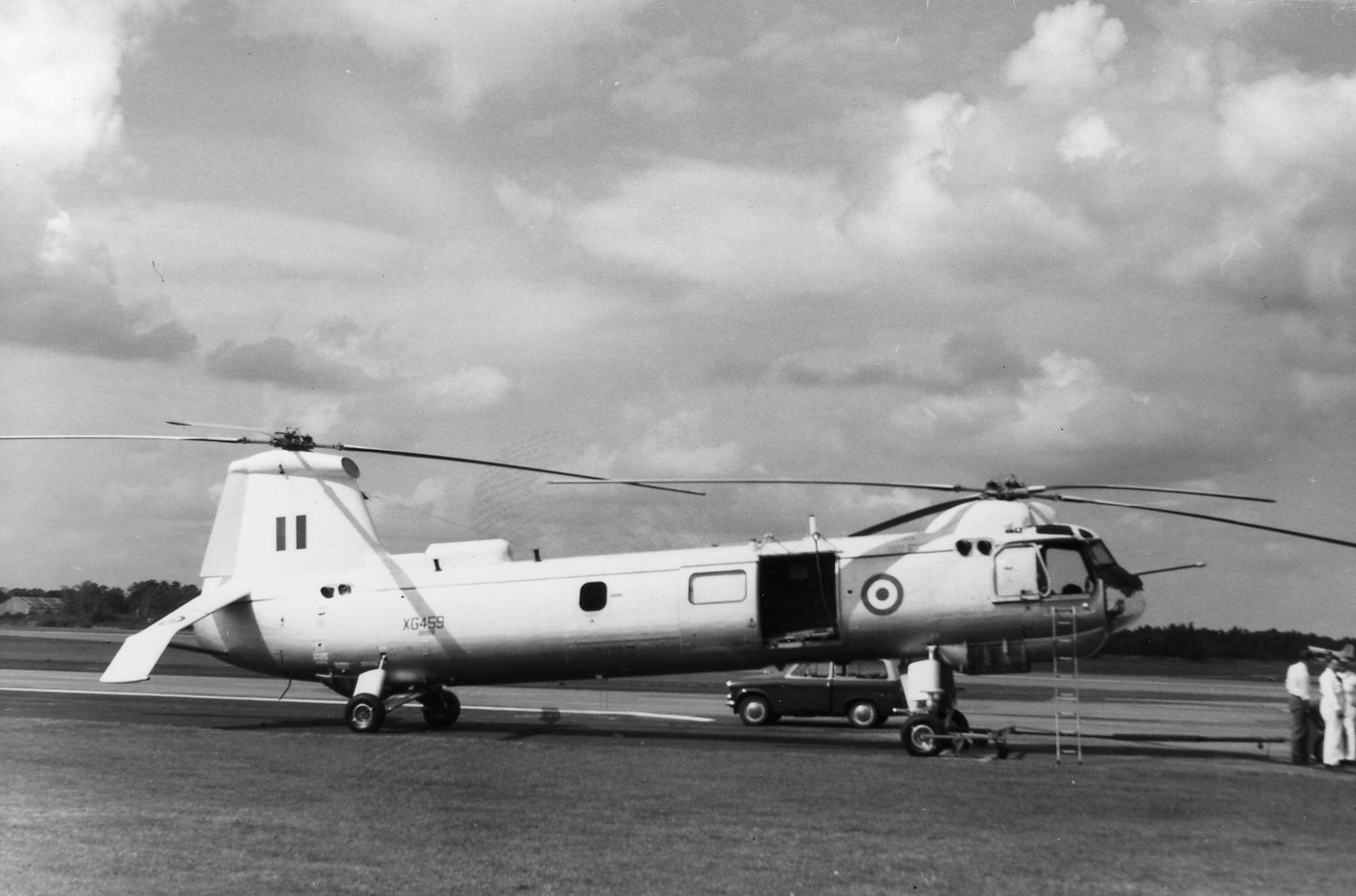
Belvedere XG459 at the SBAC show, Farnborough, 9 September 1961

Type 173
Civil transport prototype
Type 191
Projected naval version. Never flown; the first two aircraft were used as Gazelle ground test rigs for Type 192.
Type 192
Military transport helicopter for the Royal Air Force, under designation Belvedere HC Mk 1.
Type 192C
Proposed civil version with 24 seats, not built.
Type 193
Variant for the Royal Canadian Navy based on the Type 191, not built.
Type 194
Proposed civil version of Type 192 with de Havilland Gnome engines.

== Operators ==
United Kingdom

- Royal Air Force
  - No. 26 Squadron RAF
  - No. 66 Squadron RAF
  - No. 72 Squadron RAF

== Surviving aircraft ==
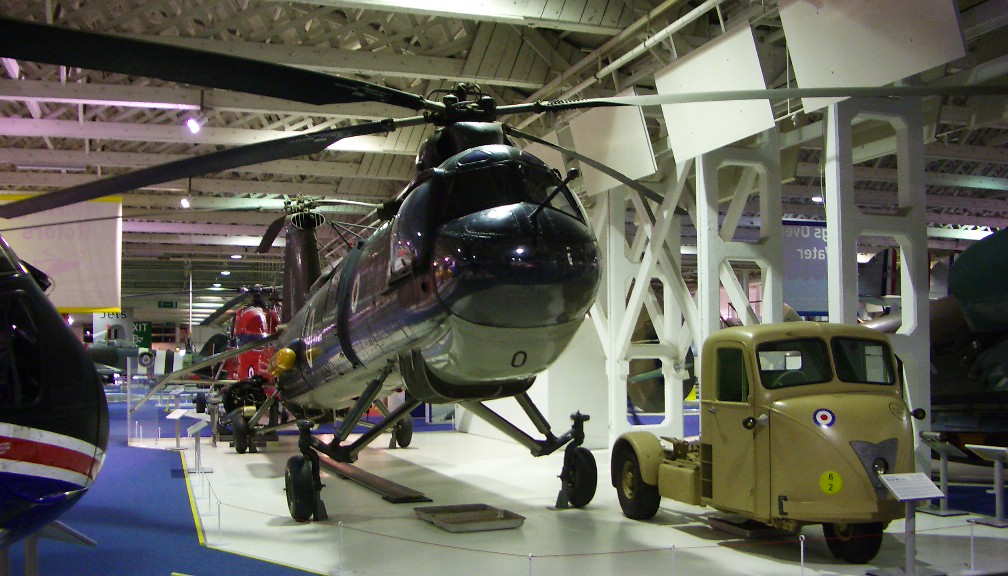
Belvedere at the RAF Museum, Hendon

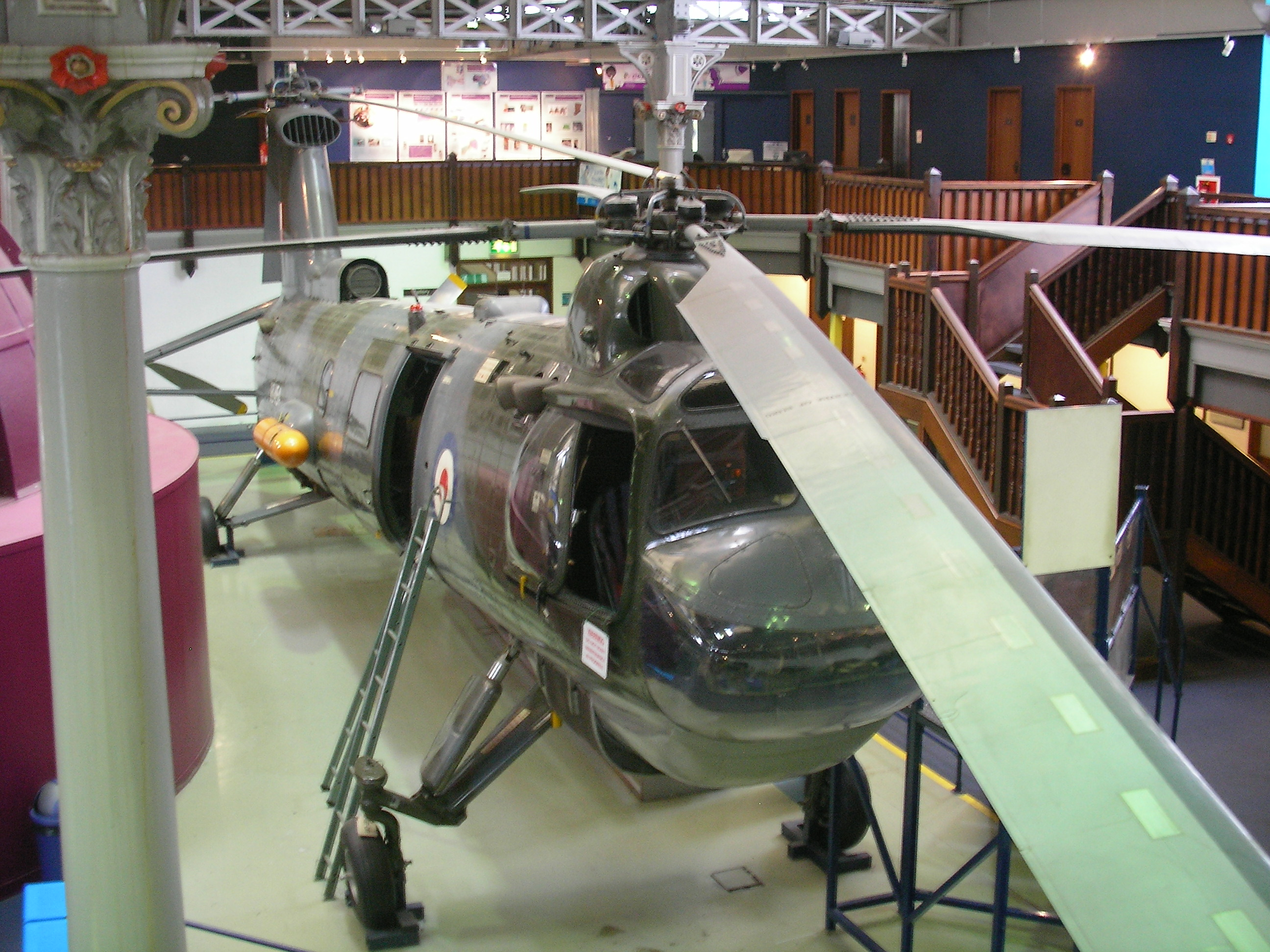
Belvedere at Museum of Science and Industry (Manchester), UK

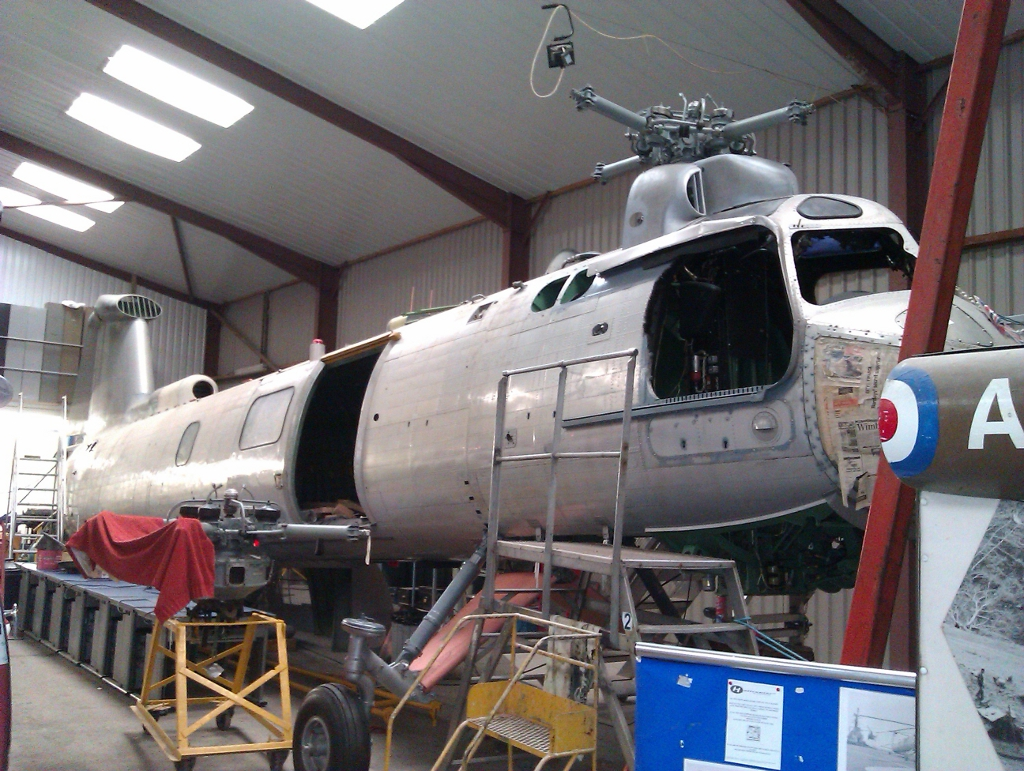
Belvedere at The Helicopter Museum, Weston-Super-Mare, UK

The following Bristol Belvederes have been preserved and are either on display or undergoing restoration.

Belvedere HC.1

- XG452 undergoing restoration at The Helicopter Museum, Weston-Super-Mare.
- XG454 on display at The Helicopter Museum, Weston-super-Mare.
- XG474 on display at Royal Air Force Museum, Hendon.
- XG462 (nose section only) at The Helicopter Museum, Weston-Super-Mare.

== Specifications (Belvedere HC.1) ==
Data from In the Air: No. 155 – Westland Belvedere

General characteristics

- Crew: 3
- Capacity:
  - 19 fully equipped troops or
  - 12 stretchers with two seated wounded and a medical attendant or
  - 6,000 lb (2,700 kg) cargo (internal or slung)
- Length: 54 ft 4 in (16.56 m)
- Height: 17 ft 0 in (5.18 m)
- Empty weight: 11,350 lb (5,148 kg)
- Max takeoff weight: 19,000 lb (8,618 kg)
- Powerplant: 2 × Napier Gazelle turboshaft, 1,465 shp (1,092 kW) each
- Main rotor diameter: 2 × 48 ft 11 in (14.91 m)
- Main rotor area: 3,270 sq ft (304 m^{2})

Performance

- Cruise speed: 138 mph (222 km/h, 120 kn) (maximum)
- Range: 460 mi (740 km, 400 nmi) (standard tankage)
- Service ceiling: 12,000 ft (3,700 m)
- Rate of climb: 850 ft/min (4.3 m/s)
- Vertical climb rate: 440 ft/min (2.2 m/s)

== See also ==
Related development

- Bristol Type 173

Aircraft of comparable role, configuration, and era

- Boeing Vertol CH-46 Sea Knight
- Piasecki H-21
- Yakovlev Yak-24

Related lists

- List of aircraft of the Royal Air Force
