= Napier Gazelle =

1950s British aircraft turboshaft engine

Gazelle
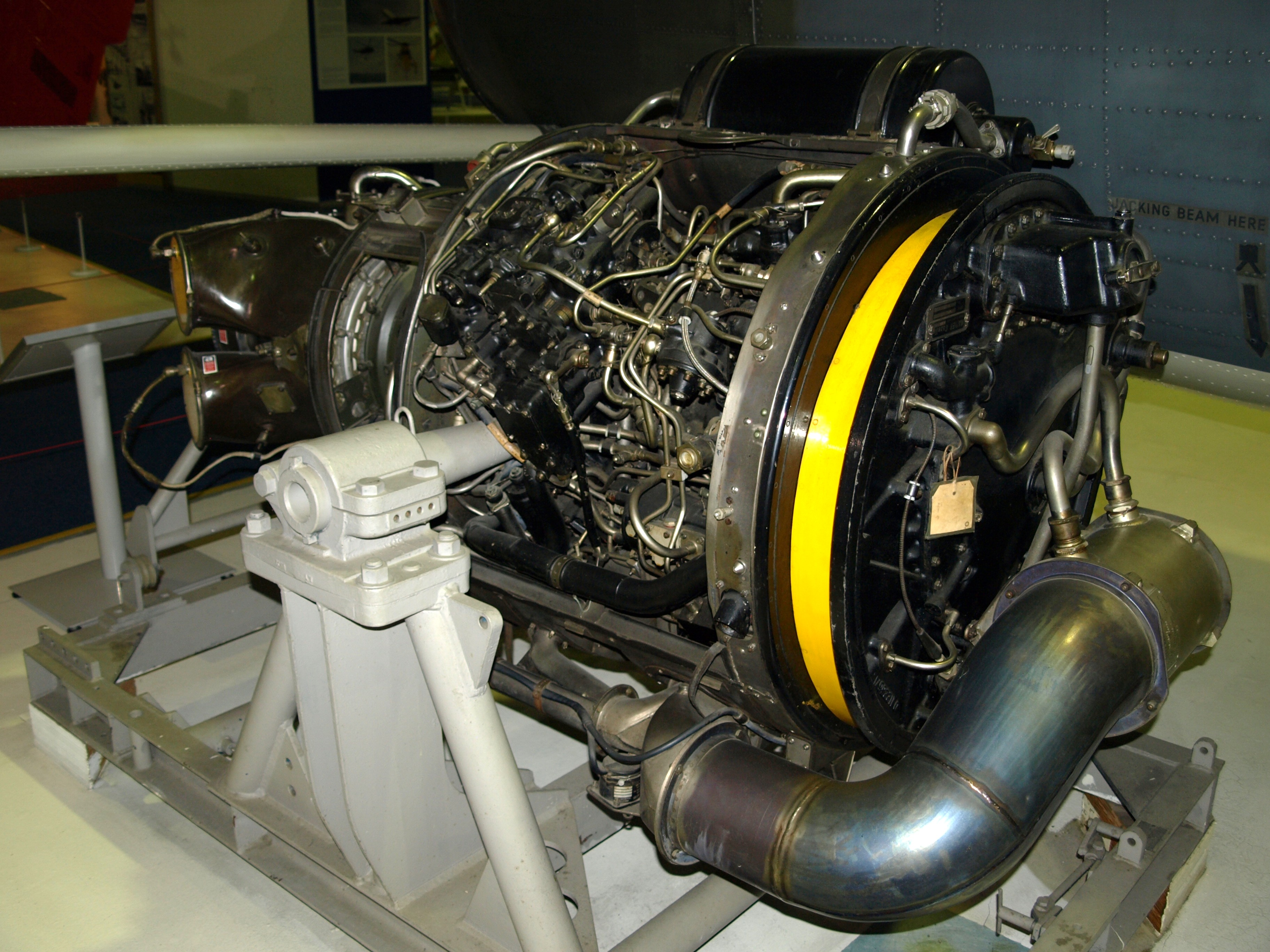
- Napier Gazelle at the Royal Air Force Museum London
- Type: Turboshaft aero engine
- Manufacturer: D. Napier & Son
- First run: December 1955
- Major applications: Westland Wessex; Bristol/Westland Belvedere

The Napier Gazelle is a turboshaft helicopter engine that was manufactured by D. Napier & Son in the mid-1950s. In 1961 production was nominally transferred to a joint venture with Rolls-Royce called Napier Aero Engines Limited. But the venture closed two years later.

== Variants ==
NGa.1
Emergency rating 1,260 shp (940 kW) at 20,400 rpm, 1 hour rating 1,100 shp (820 kW) at 19,800 rpm, Max continuous rating 920 shp (690 kW) at 19,000 rpm
NGa.2
Emergency rating 1,650 shp (1,230 kW) at 20,400 rpm
NGa.2(R)
NGa.2 series 2
NGa.3
Emergency rating 1,800 shp (1,300 kW) at 20,400 rpm
NGa.4
Emergency rating 2,000 shp (1,500 kW) at 20,400 rpm
NGa.13(R)
NGa.13 series 2
NGa.18
NGa.22
Mk.101
Mk.161
Mk.162
(NGa.13 series 2)
Mk.165
Gazelle 501
Gazelle 503
Gazelle 512
Gazelle 514
Gazelle E.219

== Applications ==
These helicopter engines were used on the Westland Wessex HAS 1 and HAS 3 (other versions of the Wessex had two Rolls-Royce Gnome engines) and the Bristol Belvedere (later Westland Belvedere) transport helicopter.

== Engines on display ==
A preserved Napier Gazelle is on display at the Royal Air Force Museum London. A preserved Napier Gazelle from a Westland Wessex helicopter is on display at the Queensland Air Museum, Caloundra, Australia. A Napier Gazelle is on display at the South Yorkshire Aircraft Museum, Doncaster A further Napier Gazelle is displayed at the Solent Sky Museum, Southampton

== Specifications (Gazelle 501 / Mk.101 / NGa.2(R)) ==
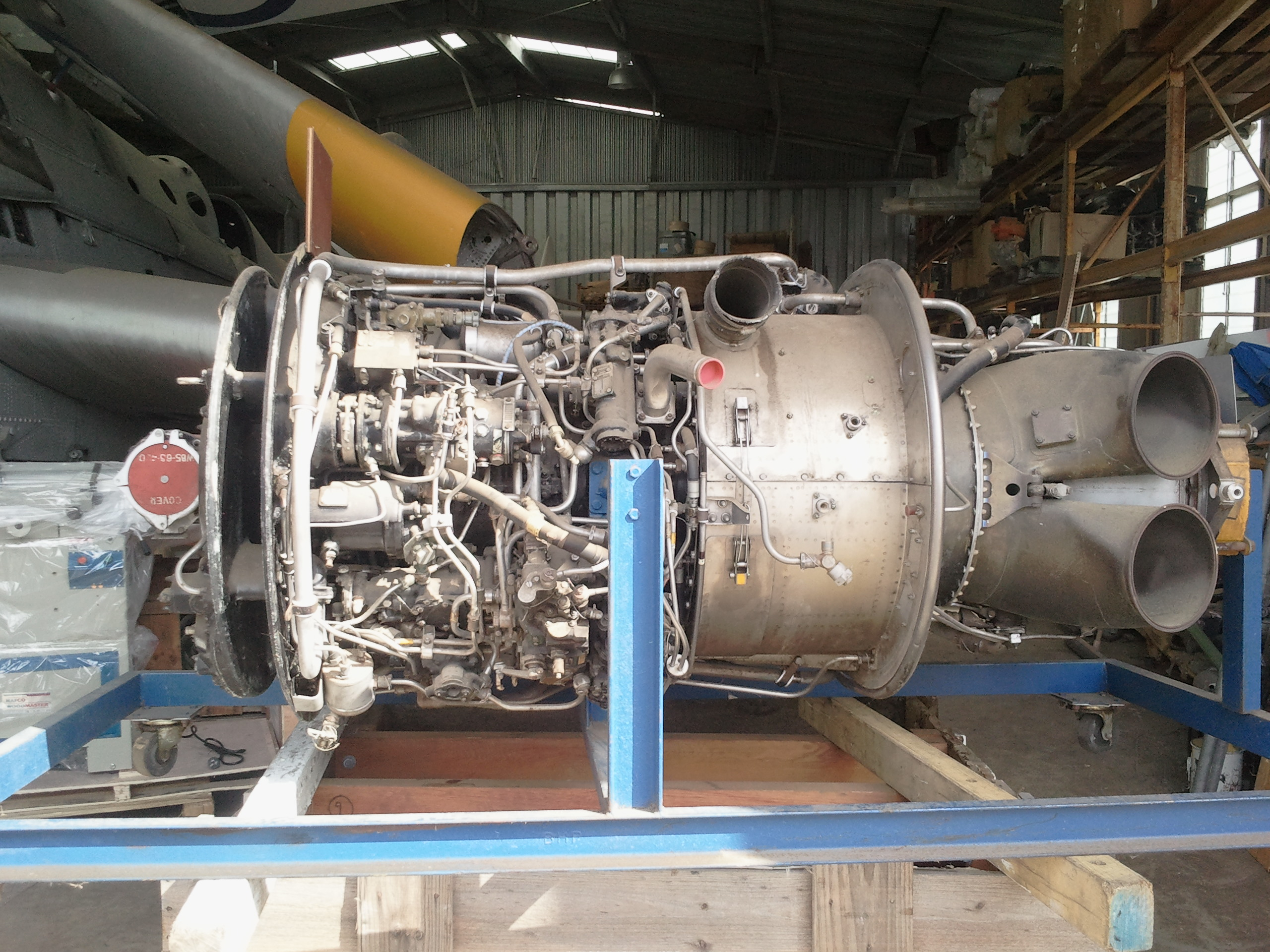
Left view, Fleet Air Arm Museum, Australia

Data from Jane's All the World's Aircraft 1962-63 and Flightglobal archive.

==== General characteristics ====
- Type: Turboshaft
- Length: 70 in (1,778 mm)
- Diameter: 33.5 in (851 mm)
- Dry weight: 830 lb (376.5 kg)

==== Components ====
- Compressor: 11-stage axial flow
- Combustors: 6 flame tubes
- Turbine: 2-stage gas generator power turbine + 1-stage free power turbine
- Fuel type: Aviation kerosene
- Oil system: Pressure spray / splash with gear pump and dry sump

==== Performance ====
- Maximum power output: 1,650 hp (1,230 kW) + 260 lbf (1.2 kN) thrust at 3,000 output shaft rpm, maximum rating for 2.5 minutes
- Overall pressure ratio: 6.25:1
- Air mass flow: 16.8 lb/s (7.6 kg/s)
- Specific fuel consumption: 0.688 lb/(hp h) (0.4185 kg/(kW h))
- Power-to-weight ratio: 1.458 hp/lb (2.397 kW/kg)

== See also ==
Comparable engines

- General Electric T58
- Rolls-Royce Gnome

Related lists

- List of aircraft engines
