= Don R. Berlin =

American aerospace engineer (1898–1982)

- Born: June 13, 1898; Romona, Indiana
- Died: May 17, 1982 (aged 83); Middletown, Pennsylvania
- Education: Purdue University
- Spouse: Helen Elizabeth Berlin (née Hentz)
- Children: Donald Edward Berlin
- Parent(s): Charles N. Berlin, Maude Easter Berlin (née Mull)
- Engineering career
- Discipline: Mechanical engineering
- Employers: Douglas Aircraft Company: 1926–1929; Northrop Corporation: 1929–1934; Curtiss-Wright: 1934–1941; Fisher Body, GM: 1942–1947; McDonnell Aircraft: 1947–1953; Piasecki/Vertol/Boeing: 1953–1963; Curtiss-Wright: 1963–1973; W. Pat Crow Forgings: 1973–1978; E.F. Felt: 1978–1979
- Projects: Designed the Curtiss P-36 Hawk, Curtiss P-40 Warhawk, Curtiss SO3C Seamew, Curtiss-Wright XP-55 Ascender and Fisher P-75 Eagle; supervised the design of the Curtiss C-46 Commando and Curtiss SB2C Helldiver
- Awards: Honorary Doctorate, Engineering, Purdue University (1953)

Donovan Reese Berlin (June 13, 1898 – May 17, 1982) was an American military aircraft designer and aircraft industry executive. Among the many designs with which he is associated are the Curtiss P-36 Hawk and P-40 Warhawk and the Fisher P-75 Eagle. His name is "synonymous with the development of military aviation".

== Early years ==
Berlin was born in Romona, Indiana and in his formative years, lived in Brook, Indiana. He attended Purdue University, graduating in 1921 with a bachelor's degree in mechanical engineering.

== Aviation career ==
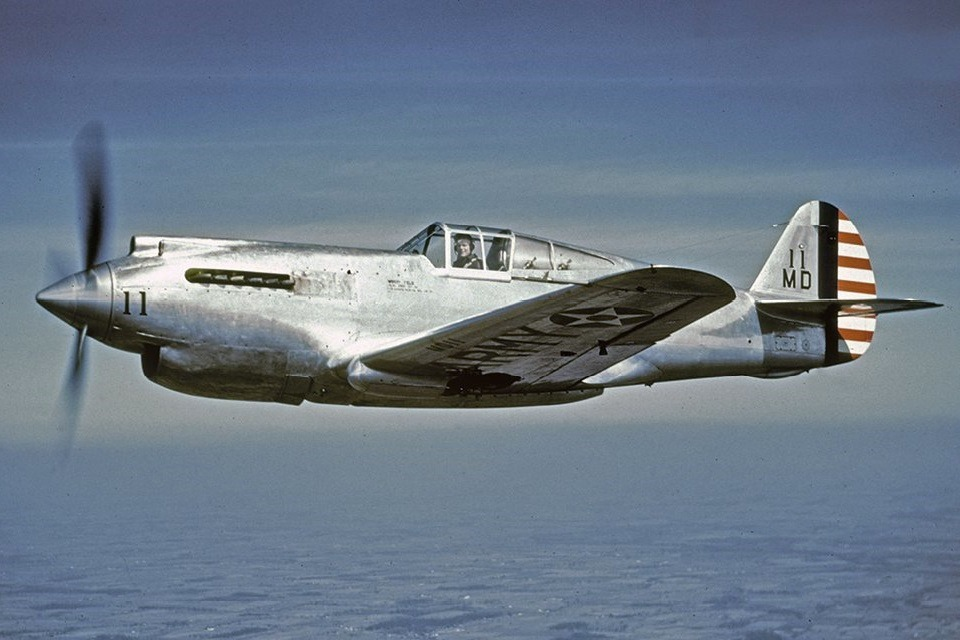
An XP-40, 11 MD, which was used for test purposes by the Materiel Division of the U.S. Army Air Corps

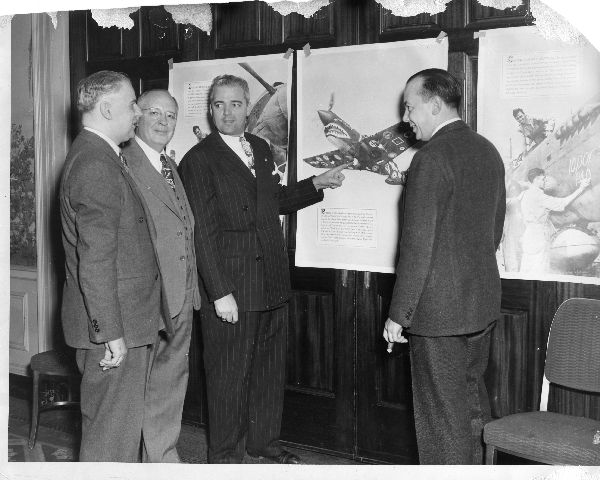
Curtiss company executives, with their most famous design, represented by a P-40N that was firm's 15,000th fighter, November 1944.

With his introduction to aeronautics, conducting early wind tunnel tests for the U.S. Army Air Corps at McCook Field, Dayton, Ohio, Berlin subsequently worked for Douglas Aircraft Company starting in 1926 as project engineer and chief draftsman. In 1929, he left Douglas to work at Northrop Corporation where he was assigned to the Northrop Alpha, Gamma and Delta development. In a controversial move, Berlin was released when he and founder Jack Northrop were in disagreement over the wing design of a new fighter. Berlin was quickly hired at Curtiss-Wright in 1934, beginning a long career with the company.

Curtiss-Wright President Ralph Damon hired Berlin, impressed with his experience working with metal construction at Northrop, a key factor in his rapid promotion to Chief Engineer. Berlin's first assignment was as project engineer on the company's new fighter aircraft design, bearing the nomenclature 'design number 75'. After first competing and losing to the Seversky P-35 in a fighter competition, Berlin persevered and his reconfigured design, initially known as the Y1P-36, and later, P-36 Hawk, won the U.S. Army Air Corps fighter competition in 1937. Consequently, the USAAC ordered 210 P-36A aircraft to serve as a frontline fighter. In 1938 and 1939, the P-36 was one of the premier fighters of the period.

=== World War II ===
With foreign orders, P-36 Hawk production exceeded 1,000 aircraft. The Hawk was used more extensively by the French Air Force, both during the Battle of France and by the Vichy French; and was used against French forces in the Franco-Thai War (October 1940–May 9, 1941). It was also used by the British Commonwealth (where it was known as the "Mohawk"), and by Chinese air units. Several dozen also fought in the Finnish Air Force against the Soviet Air Forces.

Berlin continued to develop the P-36, mating it with a more powerful water-cooled Allison V-12 engine, moving the cockpit aft, changing the location of the airscoop and making other modifications. The revised design evolved into the experimental models: XP-37/YP-37 and XP-42, before ultimately, the XP-40. The XP-40 won the fighter competition in 1939 held by the U.S. Army Air Corps. Produced as the P-40 Warhawk, over 13,000 were eventually built, in a wide-ranging series of P-40 variants. In similar fashion to the success of the earlier P-36, the P-40 was adopted by many foreign air arms, including the Royal Air Force where early models were known as the "Tomahawk", and later series, "Kittyhawk". One hundred and forty-five pilots became aces in the P-40.

Two years of research data gathered by Berlin in developing his XP-46 advanced fighter design including wind tunnel, cooling and performance tests, were sold with his permission to North American Aviation which used the data in the development of its P-51 Mustang fighter. (Note: A myth surrounding the origins of the P-51 is linked to the NAA purchase of test data on the P-40 and P-46. NAA paid $56,000 to Curtiss for technical aerodynamic data on the XP-46 and although there are certain design similarities in the radiator/oil-cooler configuration, the new NA-73X (the company designation for the future P-51) even in preliminary design, had already progressed beyond the XP-46. In addition, after the war, NAA engineers revealed that they had learned of a European study (before the U.S. entry into World War II) which indicated the value of a well-designed embedded radiator, and were eager to apply that knowledge to a new design.)

By the beginning of World War II, Berlin was Chief Engineer and the head of design at Curtiss-Wright. A number of experimental programs were begun during this period, including the revolutionary Curtiss-Wright XP-55 Ascender that never achieved production status, as well as the Curtiss SO3C Seamew, a floatplane that was adopted by the U.S. Navy, but had a troubled operational history. Although designed by George A. Page Jr., Berlin oversaw the design of the Curtiss C-46 Commando, the company's foray into civil and military transport markets. He also supervised the development of the Curtiss SB2C Helldiver, designed by Raymond C. Blaylock, the company's last major production aircraft series.

Frustrated with a lack of official backing for a new development of the P-40, Berlin left Curtiss-Wright in December 1941, and, at the request of the federal government, in 1942, he became Director of the Aircraft Development Section of the Fisher Body Division of the General Motors Corporation in Detroit. While at G.M., he designed the unsuccessful Fisher P-75 Eagle, first as an interceptor, later escort fighter, made up of components from a number of production aircraft. Although the concept was intriguing, in merging engineering and production elements, one of the main considerations was that "Berlin's reputation was such that any proposal from him had to be given serious consideration." In 1945, Berlin was named director of G.M.'s installation engineering section in Indianapolis.

=== Postwar ===
Berlin left General Motors in 1947 to join the McDonnell Aircraft Company in St. Louis as executive vice president, directing the design of several McDonnell jet fighters and the ramjet engines for helicopter rotors. During his tenure, he oversaw a number of significant projects, including the McDonnell F3H Demon for the U.S. Navy, along with the XF-85 Goblin "parasite" fighter and XF-88 Voodoo "penetration" fighter for the U.S. Air Force.

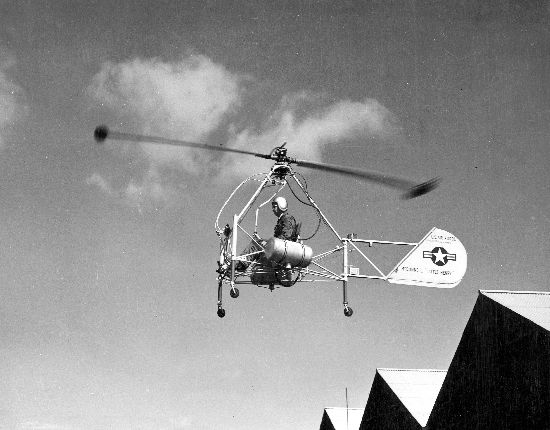
The McDonnell XH-20 Little Henry was a 1940s American experimental lightweight helicopter designed and built by McDonnell Aircraft, a design that Berlin had championed.

In 1953, Berlin was named president and director of Piasecki Helicopter in Morton, Pennsylvania. His time at the company was contentious, as he removed the founder and chairman of the board Frank Piasecki during a period ending in May 1956 that some called the "Berlin Hairlift". (Note: The catchphrase "Berlin Hairlift" was reputed to refer to "the many scalps" Berlin took, and a clever play on Berlin Airlift.) Berlin's takeover involved "cleaning house" in what industry observers characterized as a "family dispute". Berlin had the backing of the majority owners of Piasecki, including Laurance Rockefeller who felt that Frank Piasecki was lacking in business acumen. Piasecki Helicopter was renamed Vertol Helicopter in early 1956. (Note: Shortly after his ouster, Piasecki formed his own company, the Piasecki Aircraft Corporation.)

During his time at Vertol, Berlin's involvement with engineering led to the rescue of a floundering program, the Piasecki H-21 (U.S. Army CH-21 Shawnee), that eventually allowed the company to prosper. His continuing support of new rotorcraft designs for commercial and military markets was validated when the Vertol Model 107 won a U.S. Army design competition in September 1958. The Model 107, later named the Boeing CH-47 Chinook, became the Army's standard medium assault transport helicopter. By the end of the 1950s, Vertol was the largest independent manufacturer of helicopters in the United States. Berlin became vice-chairman and general manager of Boeing-Vertol when it became a division of the Boeing Company in 1960.

Berlin returned to Curtiss-Wright in 1963 as a vice-president of the corporate staff in Wood-Ridge, New Jersey, before joining W. Pat Crow Forgings as vice-president and general manager in Fort Worth, Texas. He ended his aviation career at E. F. Felt Company, an aviation components manufacturing company in San Leandro, California, shortly before his retirement to his home in Glen Mills, Pennsylvania. After a long illness, Berlin died in 1982, at age 83.

== Awards and honors ==
Berlin was awarded an honorary doctorate by Purdue University in 1953. In 1956, he was awarded the "Captain William J. Kossler, USCG Award", given for the greatest achievement in the practical application or operation of a vertical flight aircraft. On May 17, 2013, Berlin was inducted into the Niagara Frontier Aviation & Space Hall of Fame. The Claire Lee Chennault Foundation of the Flying Tigers made Berlin an honorary member, recognizing his contribution to the design and excellent performance of the P-40, their primary aircraft.

== See also ==
- Aerospace engineering
- Aircraft design process
- Edgar Schmued
- North American P-51 Mustang
- Boeing-Vertol
