= Piasecki PV-2 =

US helicopter prototype

PV-2
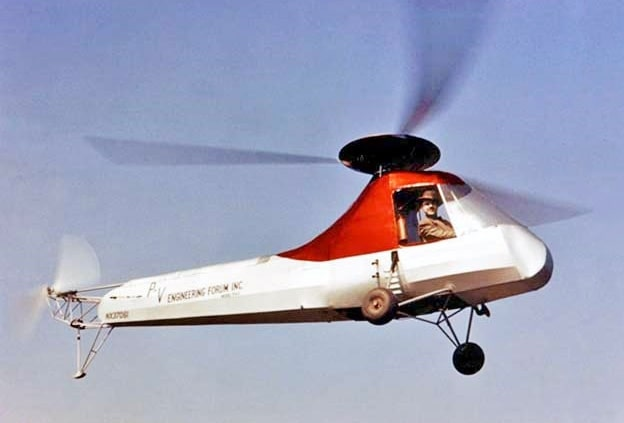
- PV-2 in flight testing

General information
- Type: Helicopter
- Manufacturer: P-V Engineering Forum
- Designer: Frank Piasecki
- Number built: 1

History
- Manufactured: 1943
- First flight: April 11, 1943

The Piasecki PV-2, some times called the Piasecki-Venzie PV-2, is a experimantal helicopter designed by Frank Piasecki. The PV-2 is best known for being the second helicopters flown in the United States after the Sikorsky VS-300. The PV-2 first flew on April 11, 1943.

== Development ==
In early 1943, Frank Piasecki, along with Harold Venzie and Elliott Daland, founded P-V Engineering Forum Inc. to build a helicopter. In the designation PV-2, “PV” therefore stands for Piasecki and his co-designer Venzie. The first project was the PV-1, a helicopter intended to test a design without a tail rotor, similar to today’s NOTAR technology. However, work on it was soon abandoned in favor of a tail rotor design.

When testing of the PV-2 began, Piasecki had no experience flying helicopters, nor had he ever flown any other aircraft himself. He made his first attempts with a machine tethered to the ground by ropes. However, after the ropes snapped, he abandoned these attempts. After a total of five hours of cautious experimentation, he succeeded in getting the PV-2 airborne.Developed as a technology demonstrator, the PV-2 brought several new features such as the first dynamically balanced rotor blades, a rigid tail rotor with a tension-torsion pitch change system, and a full cyclic and collective rotor pitch control. The official date of the first flight is given as April 11, 1943, and six months later, on October 20, 1943, Piasecki demonstrated the aircraft in Washington, D.C. Piasecki later became the first U.S. pilot to receive a helicopter license without having previously flown a fixed-wing aircraft. Igor Sikorsky had previously received the first helicopter license in the United States.

The PV-2's impressive performance led the U.S. Navy to award a contract for the development of a helicopter for the U.S. Coast Guard that would be capable of carrying a payload of 816 kg during search-and-rescue missions. This gave rise to the Piasecki series of tandem helicopters. In this case the PV-3 which led later to the Piasecki HRP Rescuer.

The PV-2 is now on display at the National Air and Space Museum's Steven F. Udvar-Hazy Center. It was gifted to the museum by Frank Piasecki himself.

== Design ==
The fuselage structure is a welded steel tube lattice frame covered entirely with fabric. The landing gear consists of a fixed two-legged main landing gear and a tail skid. Because the rotor blades can be folded down, the aircraft can be stored in a standard garage.

The powerplant consists of a four-cylinder Franklin engine with an output of 90 hp, mounted vertically behind the pilot’s seat, which drives a three-blade rotor. With the exception of the blade root and tip, the rotor blades have a uniform width of 24 cm (9.4 in). The blade structure consists of a steel tube spar with wooden ribs, leading and trailing edges. The blades are covered with fabric. The two-bladed tail rotor is located on the right side of the fuselage. When the main rotor is spinning at 350 revolutions per minute at cruising speed, the tail rotor has a rotational speed of approximately 1,600 to 1,700 rpm.

The control stick for forward and backward flight and for lateral control (i.e., cyclic pitch adjustment) is suspended at the top of the cockpit. Foot pedals change the angle of attack of the tail rotor blades and thus control movement around the vertical axis, enabling changes in direction. The rotor hub, including the blade roots, has a circular fabric fairing approximately 1 m in diameter.

== Specifications ==
Data from History - single rotor helicopters: PV-2

General characteristics

- Crew: 1
- Capacity: 2
- Length: 21 ft 6 in (6.55 m) fuselage
- Max takeoff weight: 1,000 lb (454 kg)
- Powerplant: 1 × Franklin 4AC-199 4-cylinder horizontally-opposed piston engine, 90 hp (67 kW) at 2,500 rpm
- Main rotor diameter: 24 ft 11 in (7.6 m)
- Main rotor area: 488.4 sq ft (45.37 m^{2})
- Blade section: NACA 0012

Performance

- Maximum speed: 100 mph (160 km/h, 87 kn)
- Range: 150 mi (240 km, 130 nmi)
