= Piasecki HRP Rescuer =

Military transport helicopter family

HRP Rescuer
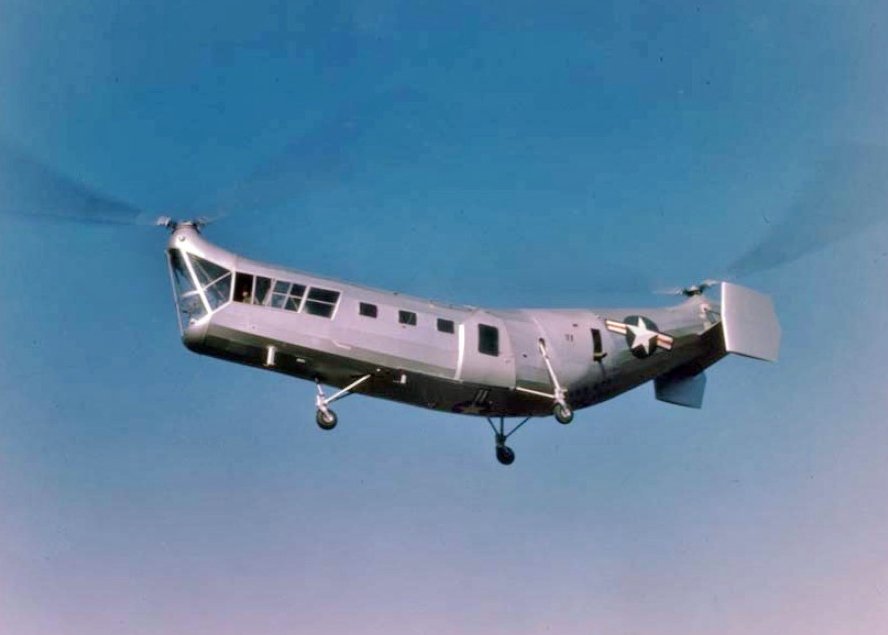
- A U.S. Coast Guard HRP-1G

General information
- Type: Tandem-rotor transport/rescue helicopter
- Manufacturer: Piasecki Helicopter
- Designer: Frank Piasecki
- Primary users: United States Navy United States Coast Guard; United States Marine Corps
- Number built: 28

History
- Introduction date: 1947
- First flight: 7 March 1945
- Developed into: Piasecki H-21

The Piasecki HRP Rescuer (also called Harp) is a United States tandem-rotor transport or rescue helicopter designed by Frank Piasecki and built by Piasecki Helicopter. The Piasecki PV-3 was adopted as the HRP-1 Rescuer by the United States Navy, United States Marine Corps, and United States Coast Guard. An improved PV-17 variant was later produced as the HRP-2. As one of the first transport helicopters in military service, the HRP-1 was capable of carrying two crewmen and 8–10 passengers or 2,000 lb. (907 kg) of cargo.

It was first flown in early 1945, entered service in 1947.

== Development ==
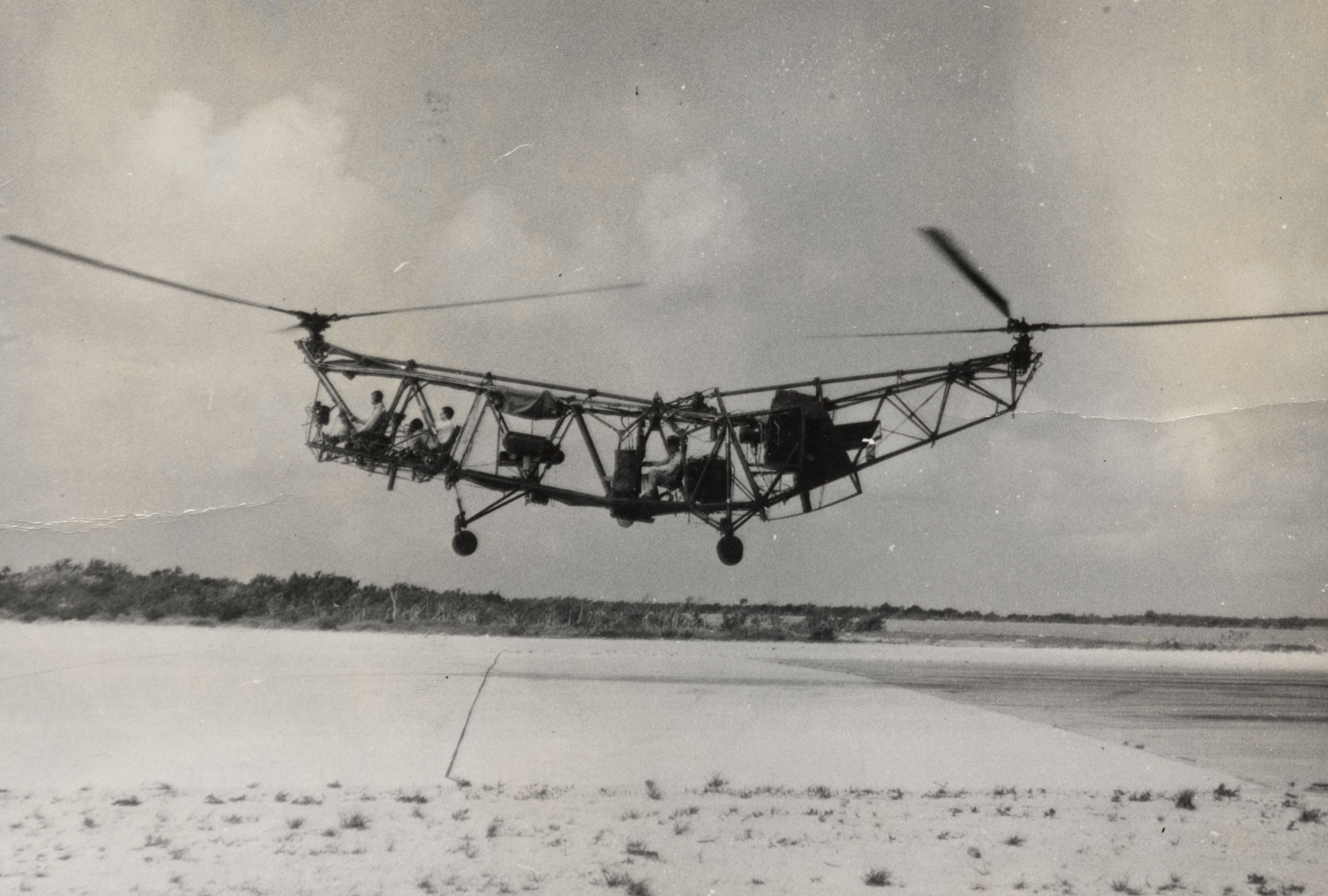
Piasecki HRP-1 "Flying Banana" helicopter at Naval Air Station Key West minus exterior doped fabric skin

The prototype helicopter (designated PV-3 by Piasecki, though commonly known to test personnel as "The Dogship") first flew at Morton, Pennsylvania in 7 March 1945 following a development contract from the United States Navy in February 1944. The "Dogship" was a novel tandem-rotor helicopter with a fixed tricycle landing gear, powered by a 600 hp (447 kW) Pratt & Whitney R-1340-AN-1 engine. To ensure that the rotors did not hit each other, the rear end of the fuselage curved upwards so the rear rotor was higher than the forward rotor. The fuselage was constructed of ordinary mild steel tubing, filled out with wooden ribs, and covered with doped fabric.

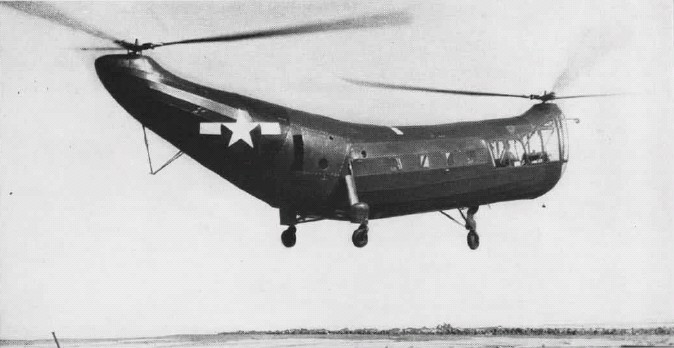
XHRP-1 in 1946

Following a series of mechanical incidents with the prototype, including stripped transmission gears, it was determined that use of common automotive parts in the helicopter transmission were inadequate to the severe loads imposed by flight; subsequent prototypes built after the war used stronger components. Two prototypes designated XHRP-1 were constructed; one was used as a static test aircraft and the other was used for development flying.

The helicopter got the nicknames " Harp" and "flying banana", a name also carried on by its successor.

== Operational history ==
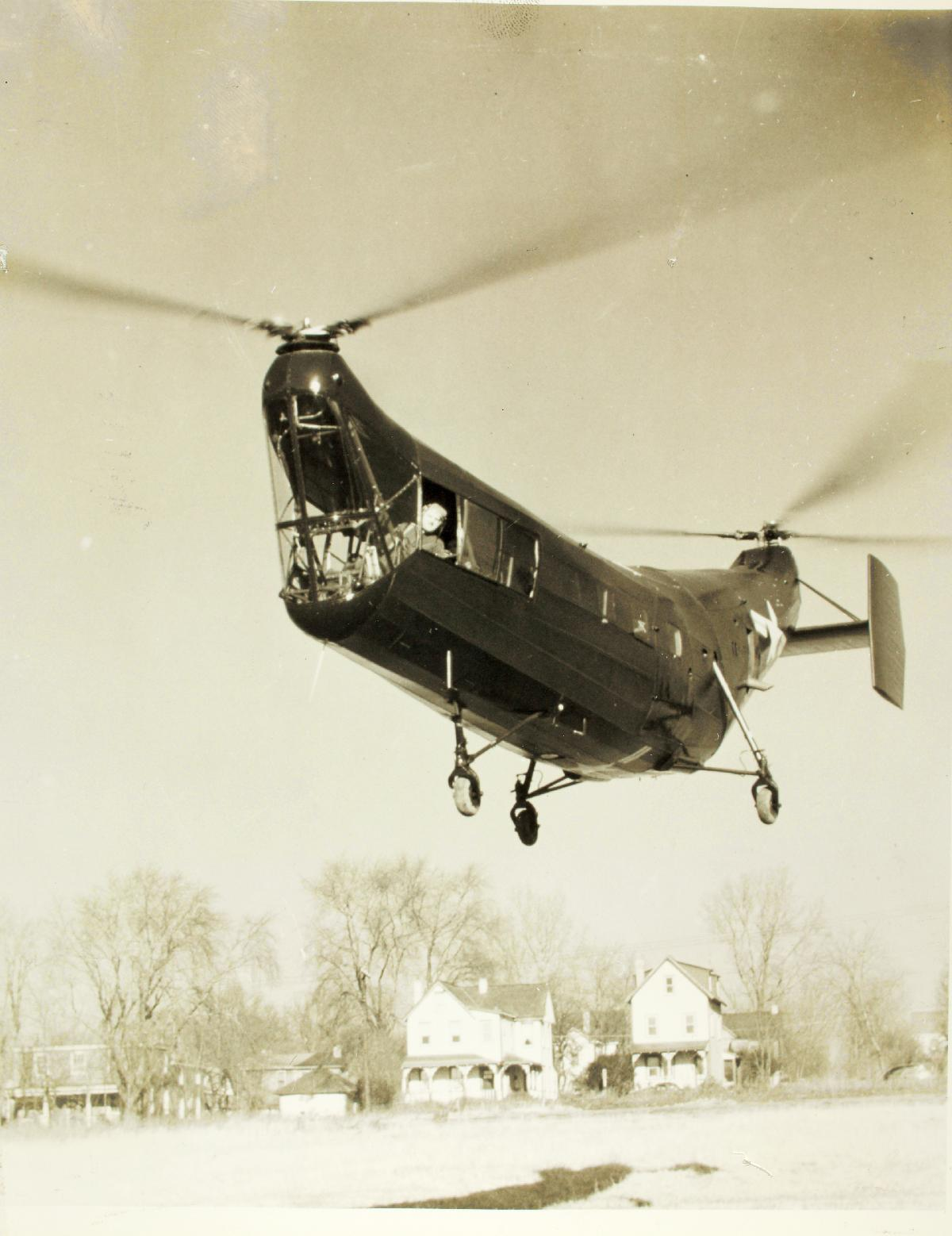
HRP-1 Rescuer, 1947

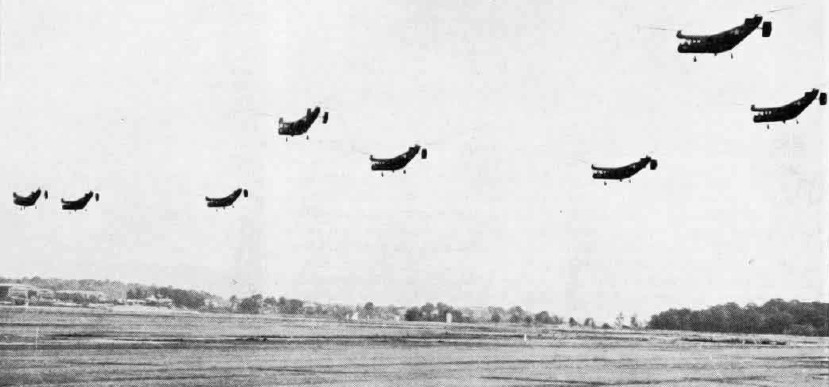
Fleet of HRP-1 helicopters take flight, 1949

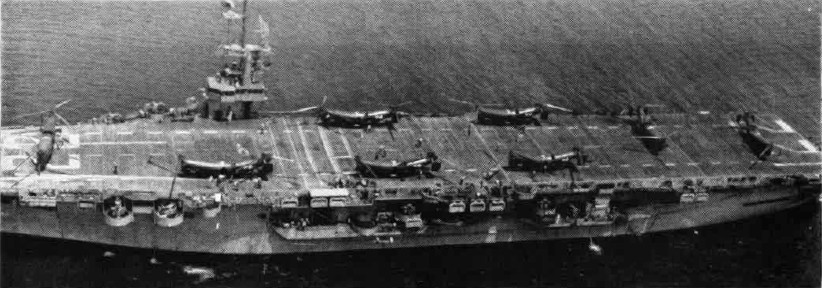
Eight HRP-1s aboard USS Palau (CVE-122), in 1951

As the first U.S. military helicopter in service with a significant transport capability, the HRP-1 was immediately put to use transporting cargo and personnel. Although referred to officially as the HRP-1, or "Harp", the helicopter's distinctive shape, with no protruding nose beyond the forward rotor's axis, soon earned it the nickname "The Flying Banana". The first HRP-1 Rescuer flew on 15 August 1947, and a second batch of 10 was built later, with the final machine delivered in 1949. All were powered by the 600 hp (450 kW) Pratt & Whitney R-1340-AN-1 engine.

In all, 20 HRP-1s were ordered by the United States Navy, which passed most of their order to the U.S. Marine Corps and the Coast Guard. Three additional helicopters were delivered to the U.S. Coast Guard with the designation HRP-1G. An improved PV-17 version with an all-metal skin was developed with five ordered in June 1948 as the HRP-2; all HRP-2s were delivered to the U.S. Coast Guard for use as rescue craft. Nine HRP-1s formed the backbone of the first Marine helicopter transport squadron, HMX-1, and were used in various exercises designed to test the helicopter's ability to deliver troops in beach assault or forward battlefield operations.

In service, the HRP-1 frequently suffered various teething and maintenance troubles such as broken engine mounts and loose fittings; it was not unusual for the fabric covering to rip loose from the helicopter in flight, often entangling the rotor blades. Despite these issues, the relative success of Piasecki's tandem rotor design would lead to the Piasecki H-21 family of helicopters.

== Variants ==
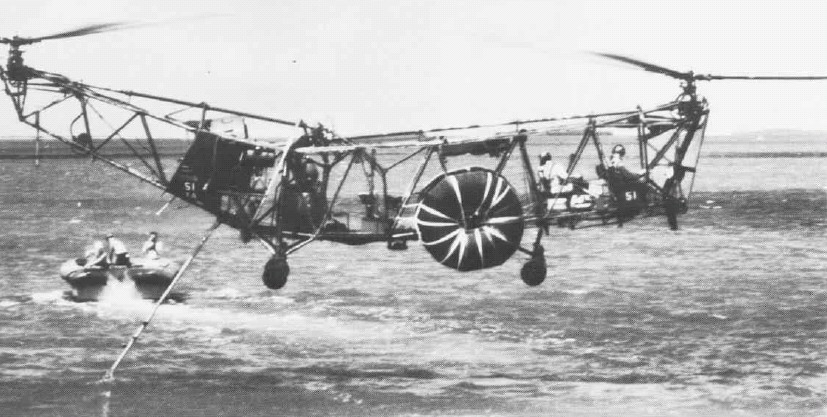
An HRP without skin in 1953

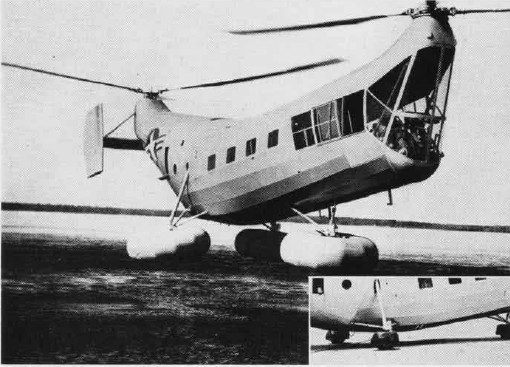
HRP-1 with floats

PV-3
Prototype tandem-rotor helicopter powered by a Wright R-975 piston engine, one built.
XHRP-1
Military designation for two further PV-3s, one for static testing and one for flight trials.
HRP-1
Production variant, 20 built including three HRP-1Gs.
HRP-1G
Three United States Navy HRP-1s for the United States Coast Guard.
HRP-2
Metal skinned variant, five built.

== Operators ==
United States of America

- United States Coast Guard
- United States Navy
- United States Marine Corps

== Surviving aircraft ==
- 111809 – HRP-1 under restoration for static display at the American Helicopter Museum & Education Center in West Chester, Pennsylvania.
- 111812 – HRP-1 under restoration at the Classic Rotors Museum in Ramona, California.
- 111814 – HRP-1 in storage with Scroggins Aviation in Las Vegas, Nevada.
- 111828 – HRP-1 on static display at the North American Aerospace Museum in McMinnville, Oregon.
- Unknown – HRP-1G in storage with Scroggins Aviation in Las Vegas, Nevada.
- Unknown – HRP-2 in storage at the American Helicopter Museum & Education Center in West Chester, Pennsylvania.

== Specifications (HRP-2) ==
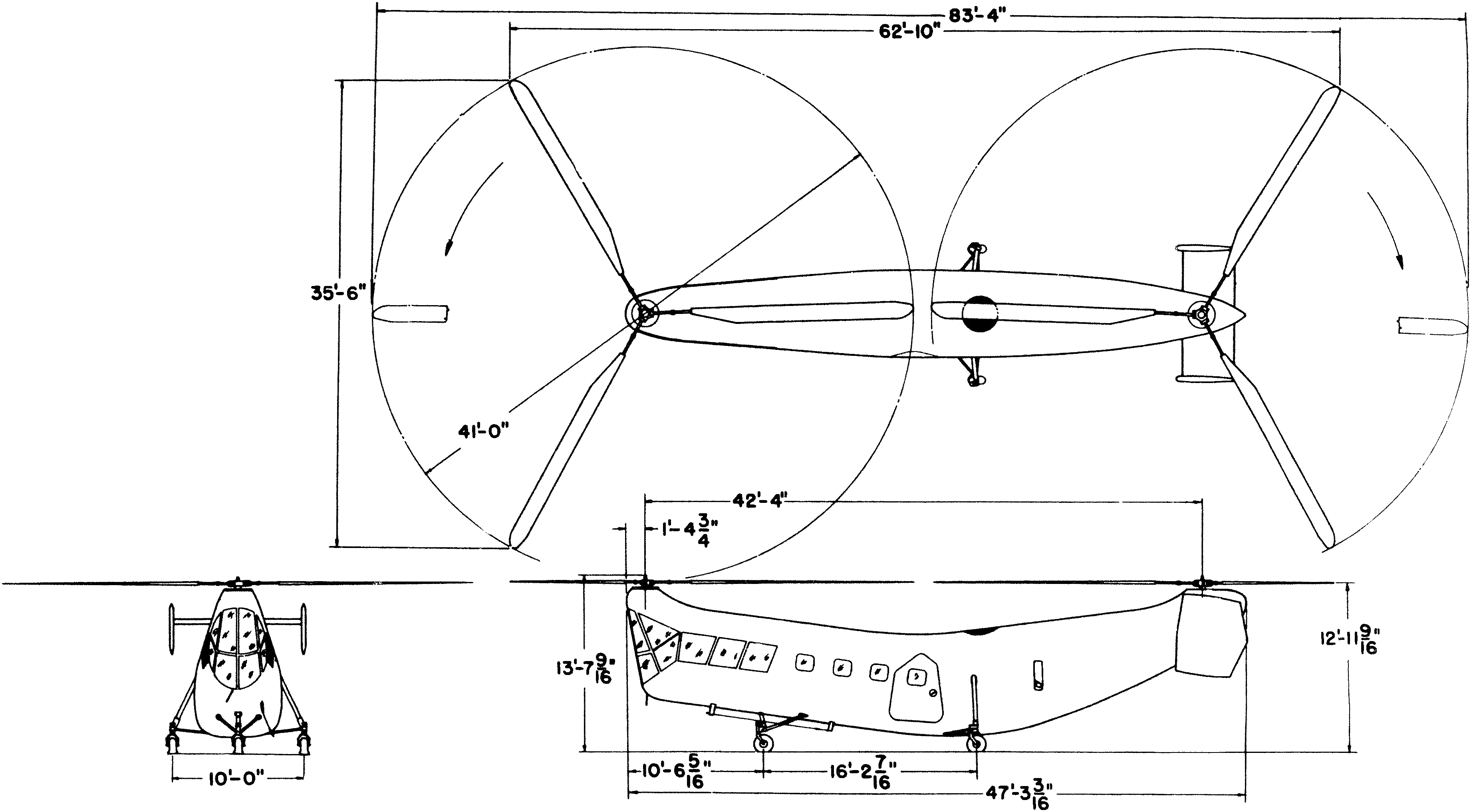
3-view line drawing of the Piasecki HRP-1 Rescuer

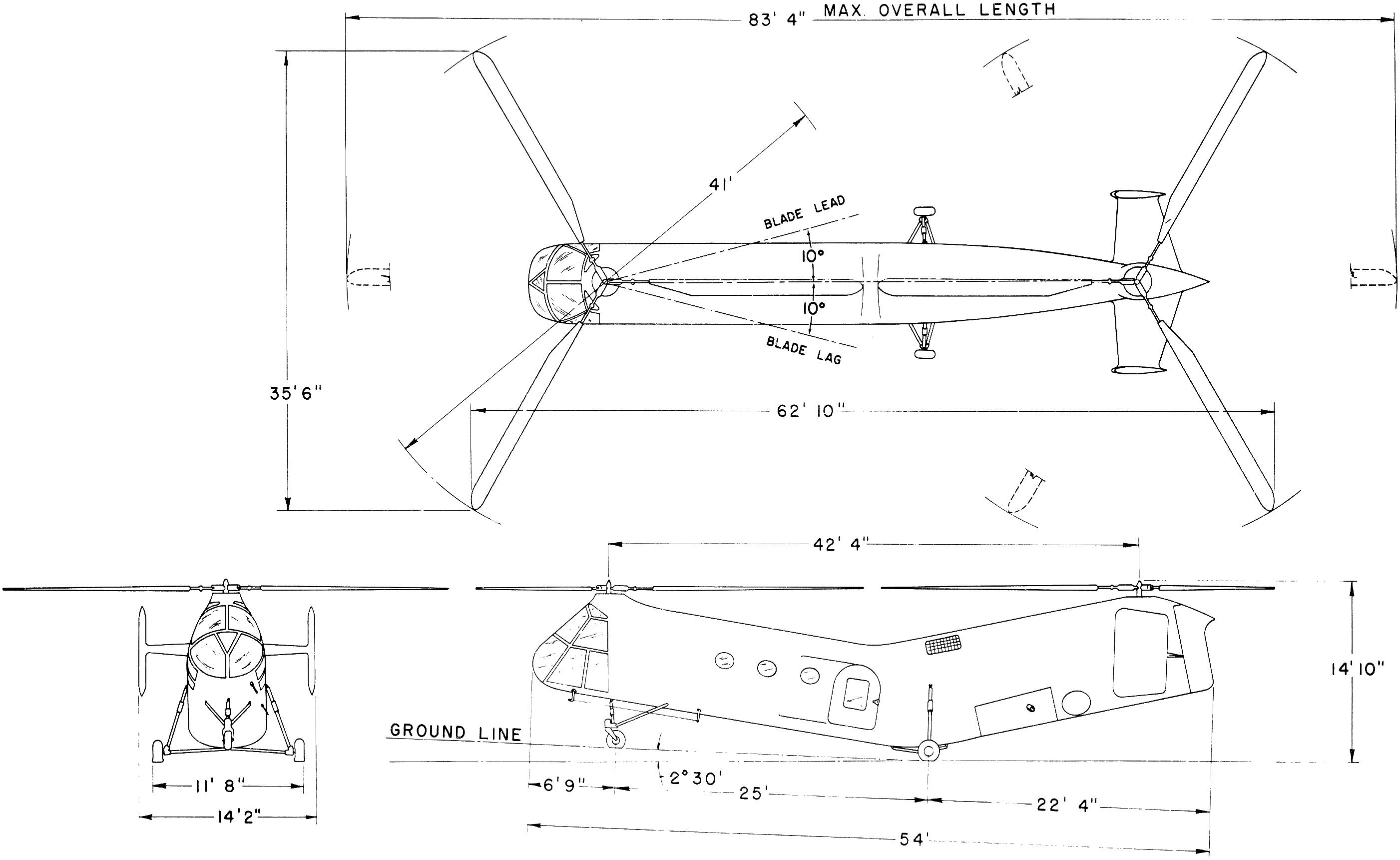
3-view line drawing of the Piasecki HRP-2 Rescuer

Data from The Illustrated Encyclopedia of Aircraft 1985, p. 2716.

General characteristics

- Crew: 2
- Capacity: eight passengers or 2,000 lb. (907kg) cargo or six stretchers
- Length: 54 ft 0 in (16.46 m)
- Height: 14 ft 10 in (4.52 m)
- Empty weight: 5,301 lb (2,404 kg)
- Gross weight: 7,225 lb (3,277 kg)
- Powerplant: 1 × Pratt & Whitney R-1340-AN-1 radial engine , 600 hp (447 kW)
- Main rotor diameter: 2 × 41 ft 0 in (12.50 m)
- Main rotor area: 2,640.51 sq ft (245.30 m^{2})

Performance

- Maximum speed: 105 mph (169 km/h, 91 kn)
- Cruise speed: 74 mph (119 km/h, 64 kn)
- Range: 300 mi (483 km, 260 nmi)
- Service ceiling: 8,530 ft (2,600 m)

== See also ==
Related development

- Piasecki H-21

Related lists

- List of United States Navy aircraft designations (pre-1962)
