= Piasecki Helicopter =

American helicopter manufacturer (1940–1956)

Piasecki Helicopter Corporation
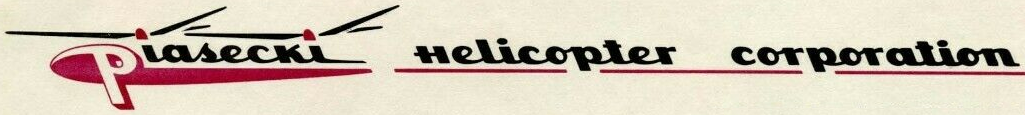
- Industry: Aerospace
- Founded: 1940
- Founders: Frank Piasecki
- Defunct: 1960
- Fate: Acquired by Boeing
- Successor: Boeing Vertol
- Headquarters: Philadelphia, Pennsylvania, US

The Piasecki Helicopter Corporation was an American designer and manufacturer of helicopters in Philadelphia and nearby Morton, Pennsylvania, in the late 1940s and the 1950s. Its founder, Frank Piasecki, was ousted in 1956 and started a new company, Piasecki Aircraft. Piasecki Helicopter was renamed Vertol Corporation in early 1956. Vertol was acquired by Boeing in 1960 and renamed Boeing Vertol.

== History ==
The Piasecki Helicopter Corporation was founded in 1940 by Frank Piasecki and fellow aeronautics student Harold Venzie as the P-V Engineering Forum (shortened from Piasecki-Venzie); the other partners were F.J. Kosloski, Donald N. Meyers, Elliott Daland, and Walter Swartz. The first design from P-V Engineering was the PV-1, a rotorless-tail design that used a tapering tail cone and pressurized air to suppress main rotor torque. Venzie left the firm in 1943.

The PV-2 (NX-37061) was a more conventional design and became the third helicopter flown in the United States (following Igor Sikorsky's VS-300 and Sikorsky R-4). It was designed and flown by Frank Piasecki on April 11, 1943. Piasecki had limited pilot experience; the PV-2 was tethered to the ground as a safety measure, but the clothesline he used broke. He towed the helicopter behind his car in October 1943 to Washington, DC to demonstrate it to federal government officials; because the wheels had no bearings, he had to stop every 10 to 15 minutes to cool them. When asked to show his pilot's license following the demonstration in Washington, Piasecki admitted he did not have one and he was issued the first helicopter pilot's license on October 20, 1943, by the Civil Aeronautics Administration.

=== Tandem rotor designs ===
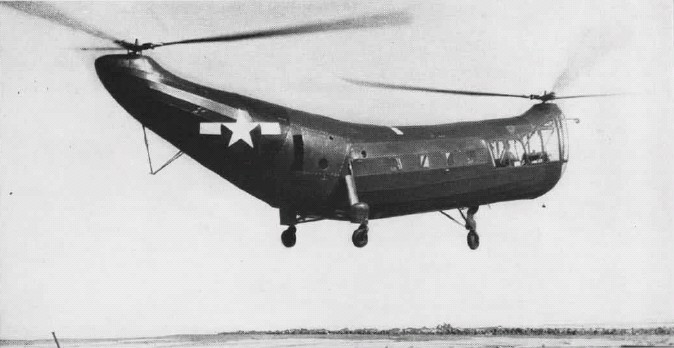
XHRP-1 during flight trials (1946)

With the successful demonstration of the PV-2, Piasecki convinced the United States Navy to fund the development of a follow-on prototype, signing a contract on January 1, 1944; this marked the start of the design and sale of a series of tandem rotor helicopters to the Navy. The resulting PV-3 became the world's first successful tandem rotor design. The PV-3 first flew on March 7, 1945 and bore the Navy designation XHRP-X; it was larger and capable of lifting more than the contemporary Sikorsky designs.

Because P-V Engineering lacked the capital to fund production, the company was reorganized and renamed to the Piasecki Helicopter Corporation in 1946, with Laurance Rockefeller and A. Felix du Pont Jr. taking a controlling interest of 51% in exchange for $500,000. After constructing two more prototypes (designated XHRP-1), the PV-3 would go into production as the HRP-1 in 1947. The HRP-1 was commonly nicknamed the "flying banana" because of the upward angle of the aft fuselage which ensured the large rotors did not hit each other in flight. The nickname would later be applied to other Piasecki tandem-rotor helicopters of similar design.

An evolutionary follow-on design to the HRP-1, designated HRP-2, used an all-metal skin and switched crew seating to side-by-side instead of tandem; however, the limited power meant only five were built, all for the Coast Guard. In 1949, Piasecki provided the H-21 Workhorse to the United States Air Force, an improved version of the HRP-2 with a more powerful Wright R-1820 Cyclone radial engine. Piasecki's tandem-rotor helicopters flew higher than competing single rotor designs, and offered a smoother ride.

At approximately the same time the HRP-1 and HRP-2 were being developed, the Navy commissioned Piasecki to design a smaller tandem-rotor utility helicopter; the resulting prototype, which Piasecki called the PV-14, was designated XHJP-1. These went into production as the HUP-1 (PV-18), with the first variants delivered to both the Navy and the United States Army (as the H-25) in 1949; in total, 339 were delivered to the militaries of the United States, Canada, and France by 1954. The HUP was designed with overlapping main rotor blades, which reduced the size so they could be carried on aircraft carrier elevators.

=== Piasecki is forced out ===
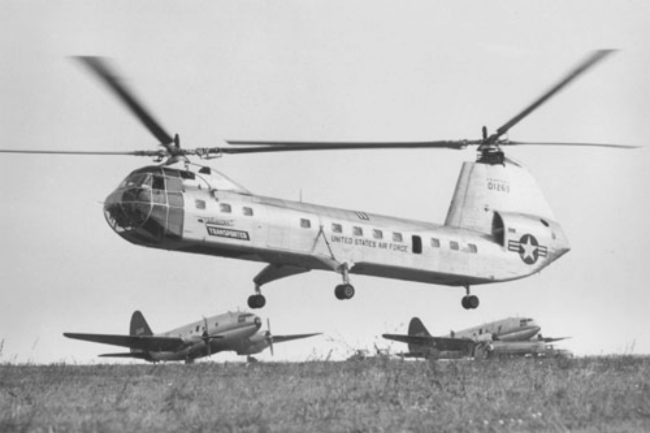
YH-16 prototype in flight

Don R. Berlin was brought in as president and director of Piasecki Helicopters in 1953, while Frank Piasecki was chairman of the board. Under Piasecki, the company began the PV-15 large transport tandem helicopter project (designated H-16). The prototype PV-15 was first flown in 1953, but a fatal crash in January 1956 led to the cancellation of the project.

The majority owners eventually lost faith in Frank Piasecki's leadership. Since the board wasn't interested in the development of compound helicopters and other rotorcraft, Frank Piasecki developed a new company, Piasecki Aircraft Corporation to pursue those designs. In two successive special stockholders' meetings the board then changed the name of Piasecki Helicopter to Vertol (for vertical take-off and landing) Aircraft Corporation and amended the bylaws to bar Piasecki's re-election as a director, on the grounds that he was running a rival company. In May 1956 he was forced out of the company.

=== Acquisition by Boeing ===
In 1956, Vertol began developing a successor to the HUP with improved lift capacity by using turboshaft engines. The project was designated Vertol Model 107 (V-107), and a prototype first flew on April 22, 1958. Impressed, the Army awarded a contract for ten production aircraft (then designated YHC-1A) in June and later asked Vertol in March 1959 to produce a larger version, which was designated V-114. With the pressure to produce two relatively new designs, Vertol again ran into financial pressure and was acquired by Boeing on March 30, 1960, who renamed it Boeing Vertol. It became the Boeing Helicopter Division in 1987.

== Products ==
Model name	First flight	Number built	Type
Piasecki PV-2	1943	1	Single rotor piston engine helicopter
Piasecki PV-3	1945	28	Tandem rotor piston engine helicopter
Piasecki PV-15	1953	2	Tandem rotor turbine engine helicopter
Piasecki PV-18	1948	339	Tandem rotor piston engine helicopter
Piasecki PV-22	1952	707	Tandem rotor piston engine helicopter
Vertol VZ-2	1957	1	Twin engine experimental tiltwing aircraft

== See also ==
- Piasecki Aircraft
