= William J. Kossler Award =

The Captain William J. Kossler, USCG Award is given by the American Helicopter Society (AHS) International for "the greatest achievement in practical application or operation of rotary wing aircraft, the value of which has been demonstrated by actual service during the preceding calendar year." The award consists of one certificate for the selected individual or crew and honors the memory of William J. Kossler, a U.S. Coast Guard airman, aeronautical engineer and early advocate of helicopters in USCG operations.

The annual award was first given in 1951, to Col. Richard T. Knight, U.S. Air Force. Other individual recipients have included Don R. Berlin, James M. Gavin, Keith B. McCutcheon and Paul A. Yost, Jr.

Group or crew recipients have included "USSR Military and Civilian Helicopter Pilots Flying Initial Operations at Site of Chernobyl Nuclear Disaster, April-May, 1986", "Army National Guard Aviation, Hurricanes Katrina and Rita (2006)", "Australian Search and Rescue Helicopters/Sydney-Hobart Yacht Race (1999)" and "Canadian Air Force Flight Crew of Labrador 303, 413 Squadron (1997)".

== See also ==
- List of aviation awards
