= Classic Rotors Museum =

- Location within southern California
- Established: 1992
- Location: Ramona, California
- Coordinates: 33.040883°N 116.912198°W
- Type: Aviation museum
- Founder: Mark DiCiero
- Curator: Mark DiCiero
- Website: rotors.org

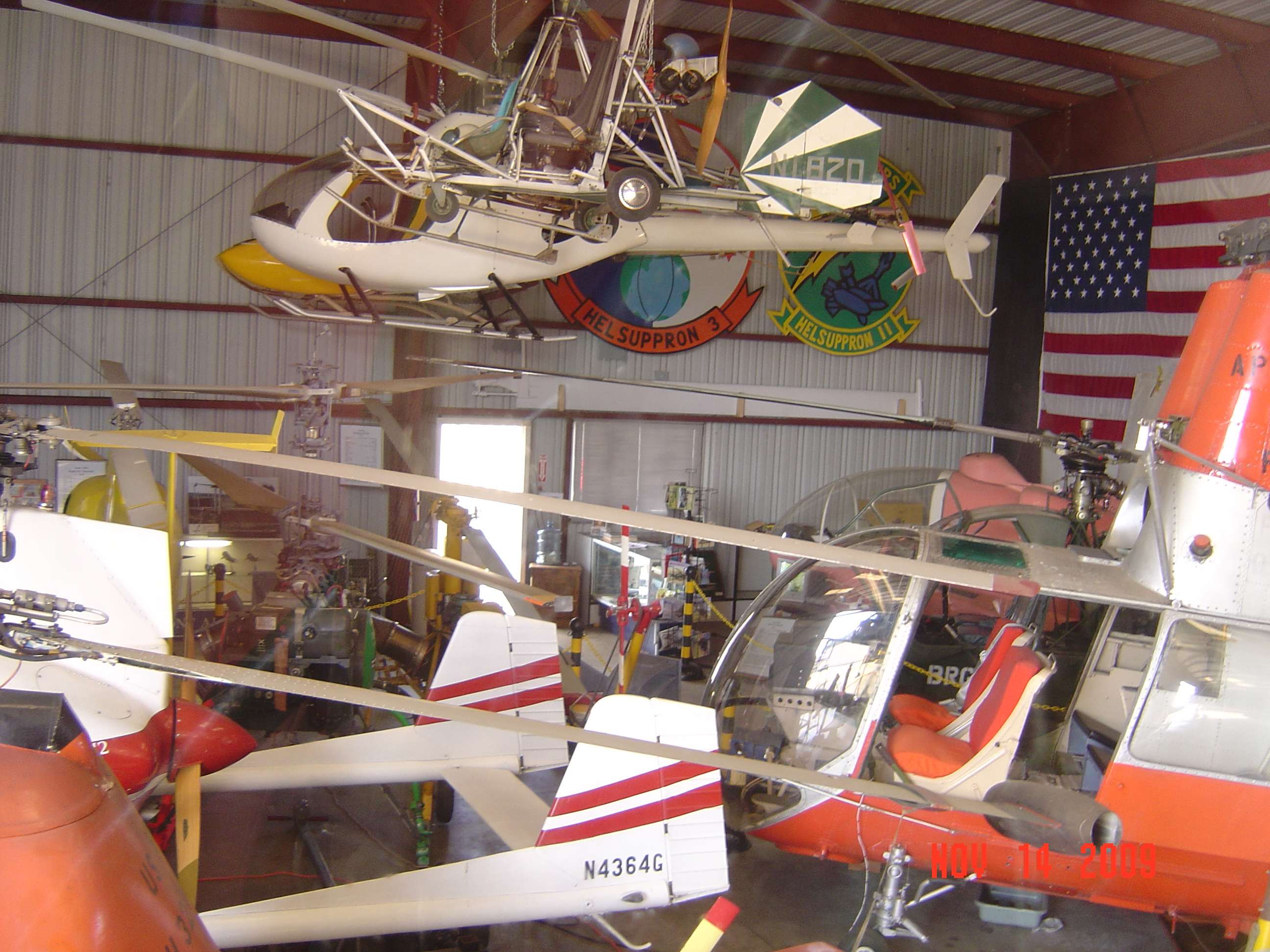
View from the H-21's cockpit of the museum rotorcraft collection

Classic Rotors is a flying aviation museum specializing in helicopters and other rotorcraft, located at Ramona Airport in Ramona, California, United States.

== History ==
The museum was founded in 1992 by Mark DiCiero, after he built and learned to fly his own helicopter. The museum is a non-profit and all-volunteer organization, with no paid staff. The museum currently has five helicopters in flying condition, which are flown in air displays.

The museum describes its mission as being:

...dedicated to the preservation of rare and vintage rotorcraft. Our mission is to preserve these rotorcraft as a tribute to the pioneers who risked so much to develop vertical flight technology. A key objective is to provide education about, and demonstrate various designs in rotor technology including tandem, co-axial, conventional (single), sync (intermeshing) and tip powered.

== Collection ==
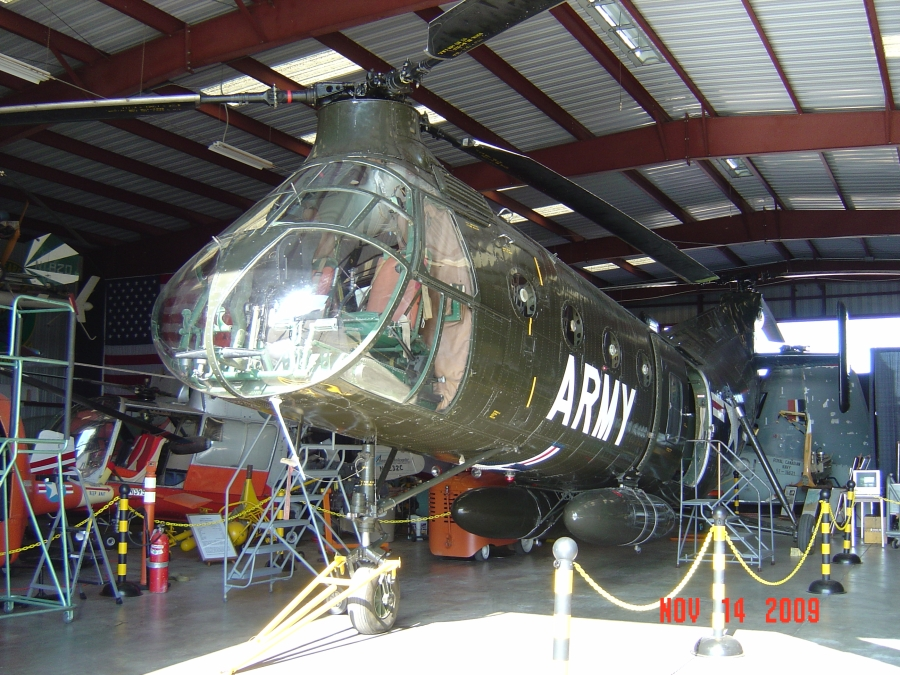
The Piasecki H-21B in the museum hangar

- Adams-Wilson Hobbycopter
- Aérospatiale Alouette III
- Aérospatiale SA 341G Gazelle
- Air & Space 18A
- Bell 47
- Bell 47G
- Bell 47G
- Bell 47G
- Bell 47J
- Bell UH-1N Iroquois
- Bensen B-8
- Boeing Vertol CH-46 Sea Knight
- Bölkow Bo 102
- Brantly 305
- Cessna 172M
- Convertawings A Quadrotor
- de Lackner 125
- DuPont Aerospace DP-1
- Eagle Helicycle
- Goodyear GA-400R Gizmo
- Gyrodyne QH-50 DASH
- Helipod
- Hiller 1094 Camel
- Hiller UH-12
- Hiller YH-32 Hornet
- Hiller YH-32 Hornet
- Hughes 269
- Hughes OH-6 Cayuse
- Hughes RWV
- Jovair YH-30
- Kaman HOK
- Kaman HUK
- Kamov Ka-26
- Kelly Ranger II
- McCulloch J-2
- Mil Mi-2
- Monte-Copter Model 15 Triphibian
- Piasecki H-21
- Piasecki H-25
- Piasecki HRP Rescuer
- Piasecki HUP-3
- Pressure Jet
- PZL M28 Skytruck
- Revolution Mini-500
- Robinson R22
- Robinson R44
- RotorWay Exec
- Rotorway 133 Scorpion
- Sikorsky CH-37 Mojave
- Sikorksy H-34J
- Sikorsky HH-52 Seaguard
- Sikorsky S-52
- Sikorsky S-55
- SNCASO SO.1221 Djinn
- Westland Wasp

== See also ==
- American Helicopter Museum, Pennsylvania, USA
- The Helicopter Museum, Somerset, England
- Hubschraubermuseum Bückeburg, Germany
- List of aerospace museums
