= Frank Piasecki =

American aerospace engineer (1919–2008)

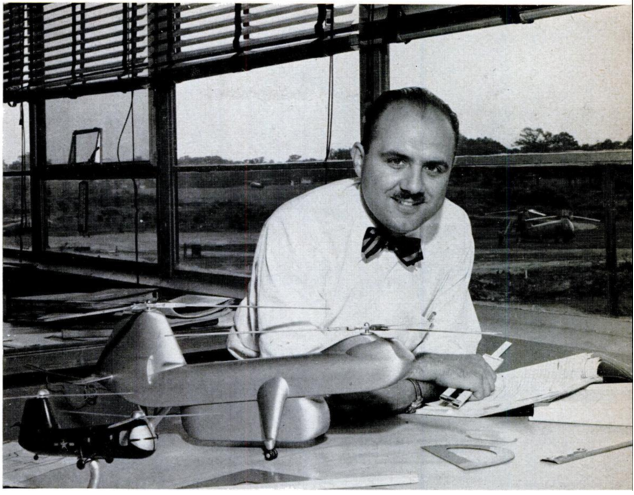
- Piasecki in the early 1950s
- Born: October 24, 1919; Philadelphia, Pennsylvania, U.S.
- Died: February 11, 2008 (aged 88); Haverford, Pennsylvania, U.S.
- Education: New York University
- Occupation: Helicopter designer
- Known for: Designing tandem rotor helicopters
- Spouse: Vivian Weyerhaeuser Piasecki
- Children: Nicole, Frederick, John, Lynn, Frank, Michael, and Gregory

Frank Piasecki (/piːəˈsɛki/ pee-ə-SEK-ee; Polish: [pjaˈsɛtski]; October 24, 1919 – February 11, 2008) was an American engineer and helicopter aviation pioneer. Piasecki pioneered tandem rotor helicopter designs and created the compound helicopter concept of vectored thrust using a ducted propeller.

== Early life and education ==
Born in Philadelphia, Pennsylvania, to an immigrant Polish tailor, Piasecki worked for autogyro manufacturers while still attending Overbrook High School, then studied mechanical engineering at the University of Pennsylvania before graduating with a bachelor's degree from New York University. He was employed by the Platt-LePage Aircraft Company as a control engineer on their XR-1 twin-rotor project. In 1940, he formed PV Engineering Forum with former Pennsylvania classmate Harold Venzie. He built a single-person, single-rotor helicopter designated the PV-2 and flew it on April 11, 1943. This helicopter impressed the United States Navy sufficiently to win Piasecki a development contract.

== Career ==
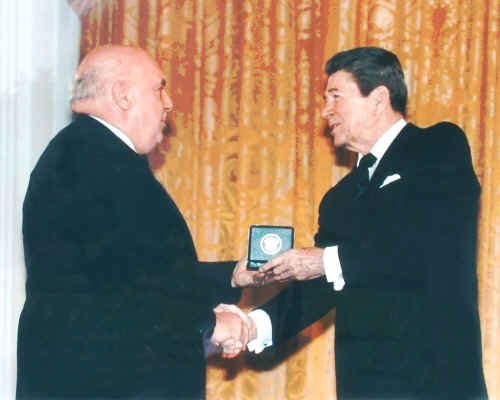
Piasecki (L) receives the National Medal of Technology from U.S. President Ronald Reagan in the 1980s.

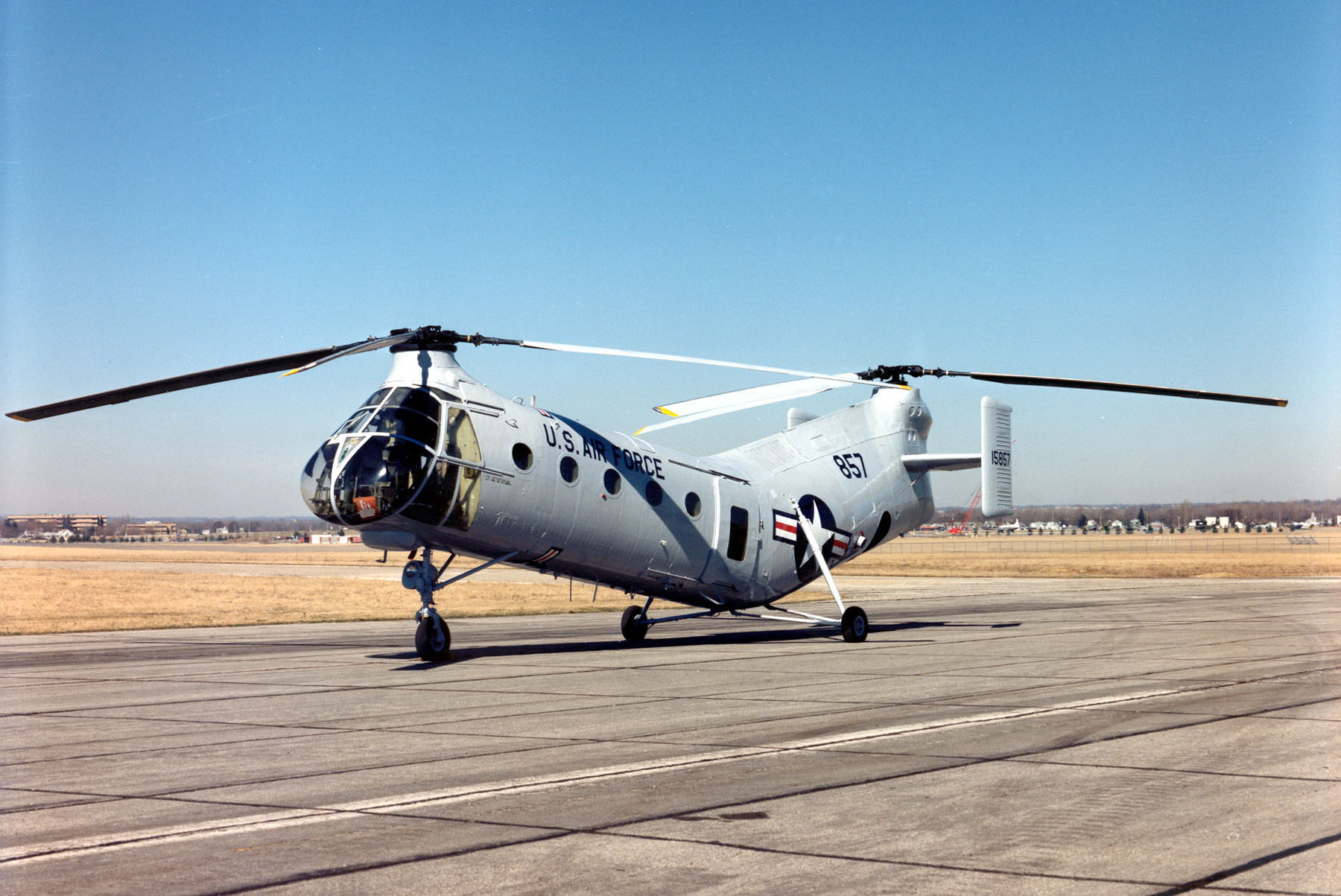
A Piasecki H-21 showing the tandem rotor design

The name PV Engineering was changed to Piasecki Helicopter Corporation in 1946. After a boardroom dispute, Piasecki was forced out of Piasecki Helicopter in 1955, and formed the Piasecki Aircraft Company.

At Piasecki Aircraft, he participated in the development of the Piasecki 16H-1 the world's first shaft driven compound helicopter, the PA-59K/VZ-8P Flying Geep (also known as the AirGeep) the Piasecki PA-97 Helistat heavy vertical airlifter and the Piasecki X-49 experimental compound helicopter.

== Personal life ==
Piasecki married Vivian Weyerhaeuser on December 20, 1958. They had seven children.

His son John W. Piasecki is now President and CEO of Piasecki Aircraft. His son Fred W. Piasecki is Chairman of the Board and Chief Technology Officer of Piasecki Aircraft. His daughter Nicole Piasecki was the vice president and general manager of Propulsion Systems for Boeing Commercial Airplanes.

== Later life and death ==
Piasecki died at his home on February 11, 2008, of a heart attack after a series of strokes. He was 88.

== Awards ==
- Philip H. Ward, Jr. Medal from The Franklin Institute in 1979.
- National Medal of Technology - President Ronald Reagan presented Piasecki with the country's highest technical honor in 1986.
- Smithsonian National Air and Space Museum Lifetime Achievement award - awarded in 2005
- National Aviation Hall of Fame Inducted 2002.

== See also ==
- Boeing Helicopters
- Piasecki PA-97 Helistat
- List of Polish Americans
