= Goodyear GA-400R Gizmo =

GA-400R Gizmo

General information
- Type: Light helicopter
- National origin: United States
- Manufacturer: Goodyear Aircraft Company

History
- Introduction date: 1954
- First flight: 9 May 1954

The Goodyear GA-400R Gizmo is a one-man helicopter proposed in the 1950s for duties such as liaison and observation.

== Design and development ==
Goodyear started developing light helicopters in 1954. The GA-400R was the third in the series. The helicopter was not put into production.

The one-man helicopter was designed to be lightweight and simple. The airframe is made of welded aluminum tubing. The rotor blades have wooden cores with fiberglass surfaces. The engine is a Johnson outboard marine engine. The transmission used rubber belts. The Gizmo has demonstrated low autorotation sink rates of 1200 ft/min.

== Operational history ==
First test flights were performed at Akron, Ohio in 1954. The GA-400R was tested by the United States Navy in 1957 at Patuxent River Naval Air Base in Maryland.

In 1966, Goodyear donated the prototype to the EAA Airventure Museum in Oshkosh, Wisconsin and can now be found at the Classic Rotors Museum, Ramona Airport.

== Variants ==
GA-400R
A 55 hp Mercury outboard powerplant.
GA-400R-2
GA-400R-3
38 hp (28 kW) Johnson two stroke powerplant

== Specifications (GA-400R) ==
Data from Jane's All the World's Aircraft 1958-59

General characteristics

- Capacity: 1
- Length: 21 ft 0 in (6.40 m)
- Empty weight: 290 lb (132 kg)
- Gross weight: 490 lb (222 kg)
- Max takeoff weight: 520 lb (236 kg)
- Fuel capacity: 4 US gal (3 imp gal; 15 L)
- Powerplant: 1 × Johnson Outboard Marine & Mfg. Model RDHE 2-stroke piston engine, 38 hp (28 kW)
- Main rotor diameter: 20 ft 0 in (6.10 m)
- Main rotor area: 314.2 sq ft (29.19 m^{2})

Performance

- Maximum speed: 65 mph (105 km/h, 56 kn)
- Cruise speed: 50 mph (80 km/h, 43 kn)
- Range: 50 mi (80 km, 43 nmi) with maximum payload
- Service ceiling: 12,000 ft (3,700 m)
- Hover ceiling: 6,000 ft (1,829 m)
- Rate of climb: 500 ft/min (2.5 m/s)

== See also ==
- List of single seat helicopters
