= Piasecki X-49 SpeedHawk =

Experimental aircraft by Piasecki Aircraft

X-49A "SpeedHawk"
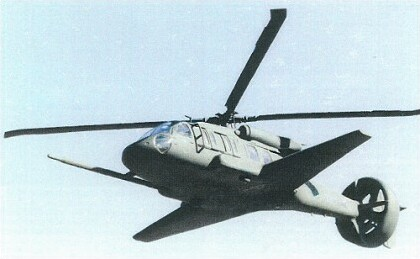
- X-49A SpeedHawk VTDP Technology Demonstrator in flight

General information
- Type: Experimental high-speed compound helicopter
- Manufacturer: Sikorsky (original airframe)
- Built by: Piasecki Aircraft (modifications and testing)
- Status: Phase 1 complete
- Primary user: United States Army
- Number built: 1 prototype

History
- First flight: June 29, 2007
- Developed from: Sikorsky SH-60 Seahawk

The Piasecki X-49 "SpeedHawk" is an American four-bladed, twin-engined experimental high-speed compound helicopter developed by Piasecki Aircraft. The X-49A is based on the airframe of a Sikorsky YSH-60F Seahawk, but utilizes Piasecki's proprietary vectored thrust ducted propeller (VTDP) design and includes the addition of lifting wings. The concept of the experimental program was to apply the VTDP technology to a production military helicopter to determine any benefit gained through increases in performance or useful load.

"SpeedHawk" is a concept aircraft based on applying X-49A compounding concepts to a production UH-60 Black Hawk offering better performance, range, and increases in useful load. The "SpeedHawk" aircraft includes an SPU (third engine), high forward-swept wing concept, a 45-inch "fuselage plug" cabin extension, and several other drag reducing and performance-oriented improvements, including a rotor hub fairing, landing gear streamlining, and a fly-by-wire flight control system.

== Development ==
The U.S. Navy-sponsored project, worth US$26.1 million when announced in 2003 ($44.6 million today), consisted of a Sikorsky YSH-60F helicopter modified by Piasecki as a testbed to validate the "Vectored Thrust Ducted Propeller" (VTDP) system. One YSH-60F, powered by two General Electric T700-GE-701C engines, was converted to test the feasibility of VTDP.

The demonstration contract was awarded by the Naval Air Systems Command to Piasecki Aircraft. In addition to the VTDP, Piasecki installed a lifting wing with flaperons on the YSH-60F.

The compound helicopter technology installed by Piasecki had been first demonstrated in trials of the Piasecki 16H-1 and 16H-1A “Pathfinder” in the early 1960s, when the helicopters were flown at speeds up to 225 mph (362 km/h). The success of the Pathfinder inspired others to experiment with compounding, resulting in programs such as the AH-56 Cheyenne.

In May 2003, the YSH-60F/VTDP demonstrator was redesignated the X-49A. During 2004, the X-49A VTDP program was transitioned from the U.S. Navy to the U.S. Army.

In 2013, it was reported that Piasecki Aviation had made plans to use the VTDP design of the X-49 for their entry in the Future Vertical Lift program, but were not chosen when that project moved into its Joint Multi-Role Technology Demonstrator (JMR-TD) phase.

== Design ==
The X-49A flight demonstrator was developed with funding from the U.S. Army's Aviation Applied Technology Directorate to demonstrate the ability to increase the speed of existing helicopters to 200 kn (370 km/h) or more. The flight demonstrator was updated with a lifting wing taken from an Aerostar FJ-100 business jet. A ring tail was added and the helicopter drive train modified to accommodate VTDP. Piasecki conducted integrated tests of the modified drivetrain at the Navy's helicopter transmission test facility. The wings were intended to produce lift to offload the rotor so the rotor could be slowed and produce less drag, allowing for higher speed.

The cockpit controls were modified with the addition of a manual propeller pitch override on the collective lever for the ring tail. This is the only visible change to the aircraft's existing mechanical controls in the cockpit. The other controls needed to operate the compound helicopter's systems were integrated into the aircraft's existing mechanical controls to reduce pilot workload. The weight added to the X-49A demonstrator aircraft is estimated at 1,600 lb (730 kg) due to the requirement to not modify the existing mechanical control system.

== Operational history ==
The X-49A made its first flight on June 29, 2007 for 15 minutes at Boeing's New Castle County (KILG) flight test center. This flight included hovering, pedal turns, and slow forward and sideways flight using the VTDP for anti-torque, directional and trim control. The X-49A project has been silent since completing its initial testing phase in 2008, with over 80 flight events and more than 80 total hours logged.

== Specifications (X-49A) ==
General characteristics Performance

- Maximum speed: 190 kn (220 mph, 350 km/h)
- Cruise speed: 130 kn (160 mph, 250 km/h)
- Never exceed speed: 220 kn (250 mph, 410 km/h)
- Thrust/weight: 1000

== See also ==
Related development

- Sikorsky SH-60 Seahawk

Aircraft of comparable role, configuration, and era

- Eurocopter X3
- Kamov Ka-92
- Mil Mi-X1
- Piasecki 16H Pathfinder
- Sikorsky X2

Related lists

- List of rotorcraft
- List of X-planes
