= Piasecki H-21 =

American military transport helicopter family

H-21 Shawnee/Workhorse
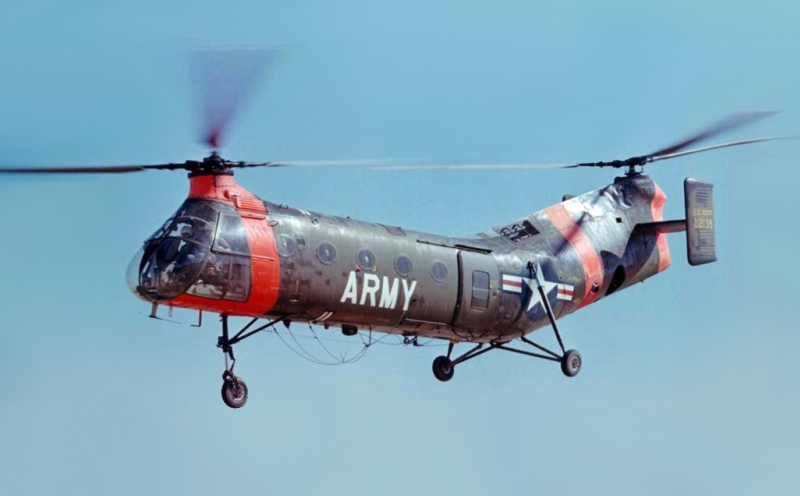
- A US Army Piasecki H-21

General information
- Type: Military transport helicopter
- National origin: United States
- Manufacturer: Piasecki Helicopter
- Status: Retired
- Primary users: United States Air Force United States Army; French Army Light Aviation
- Number built: 707

History
- Manufactured: 1952–1959
- First flight: 11 April 1952
- Retired: 1967
- Developed from: Piasecki HRP Rescuer

The Piasecki H-21 Workhorse/Shawnee is an American helicopter, the fourth of a line of tandem rotor helicopters designed and built by Piasecki Helicopter (later Boeing Vertol). Commonly called "the flying banana", it was a multi-mission helicopter, capable of being fitted with wheels, skis or floats.

The H-21 was originally developed by Piasecki as an Arctic rescue helicopter. The H-21 had cold-weather features permitting operation at temperatures as low as −65 °F (−54 °C) and could be routinely maintained in severe cold weather environments.

== Design and development ==
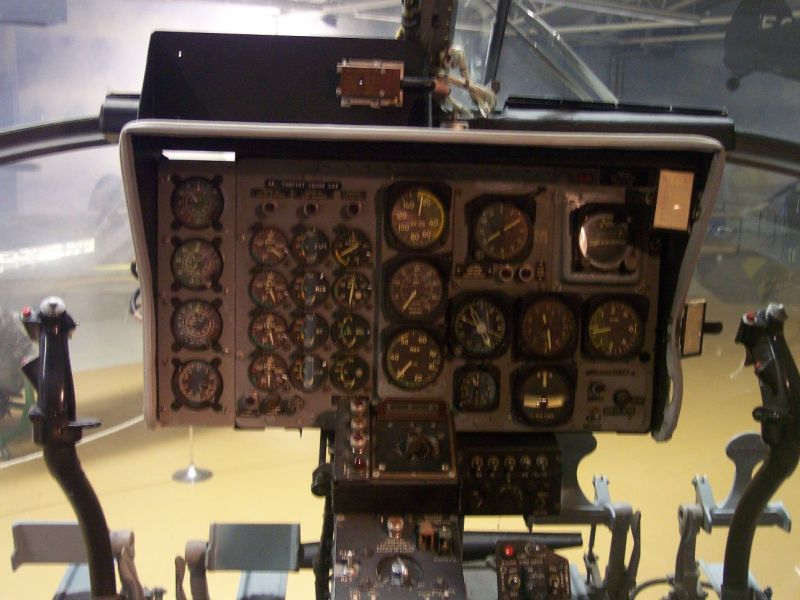
Piasecki H-21 cockpit

Piasecki Helicopter designed and successfully sold to the United States Navy a series of tandem rotor helicopters, starting with the HRP-1 of 1944. The HRP-1 was nicknamed the "flying banana" because of the upward angle of the aft fuselage, which ensured that the large rotors could not strike the fuselage in any flight attitude. The name was later applied to other Piasecki helicopters of similar design, including the H-21.

In 1949, Piasecki proposed the YH-21 Workhorse, which was an improved, all-metal derivative of the HRP-1, to the United States Air Force (USAF). Using two tandem, fully articulated three-bladed counter-rotating rotors, the H-21 was powered by one nine-cylinder Curtis-Wright R-1820-103 Cyclone supercharged 1,150 hp (858 kW) air-cooled radial engine.

After the first flight of the YH-21 on 11 April 1952, the USAF ordered 32 H-21A SAR models and 163 of the more powerful H-21B assault transport variant. The H-21B was equipped with an uprated version of the Wright 103 engine, developing 1,425 shaft horsepower (1,063 kW) and featured rotor blades extended by 6 inches (152 mm). With its improved capabilities, the H-21B could carry 22 fully equipped infantrymen or 12 stretchers, plus space for two medical attendants, as a medevac helicopter. With its Arctic winter capabilities, the H-21A and H-21B were put into service by the USAF and the Royal Canadian Air Force (RCAF) to maintain and service Distant Early Warning Line (DEW) radar installations stretching from the Aleutian Islands and Alaska across the Canadian Arctic to Greenland and Iceland.

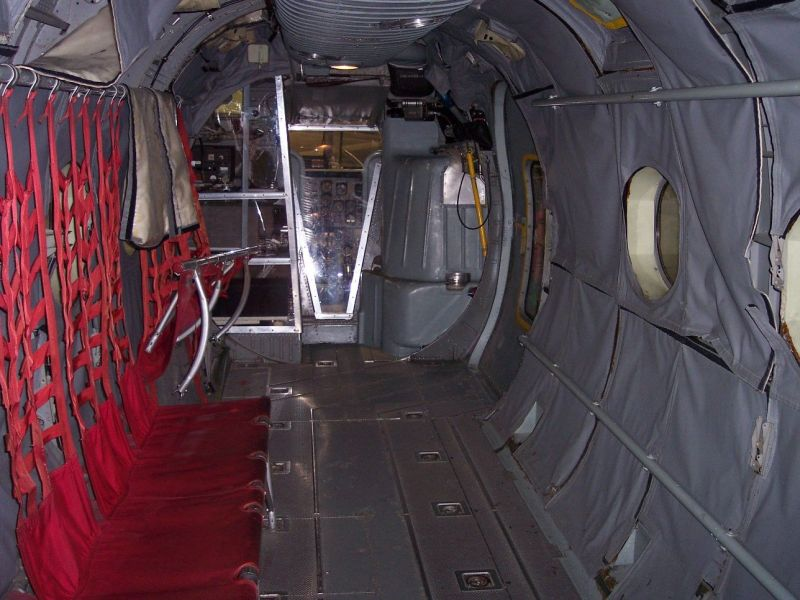
Piasecki H-21 cabin interior looking towards the cockpit

In 1952, some H-21As were evaluated by USMC helicopter squadron HMX-1 for air assault. In 1957, an H-21B was loaned to the United States Marine Corps (USMC) to evaluate the helicopter as an airborne tug to tow disabled landing ships and amphibious landing vehicles to the beach. During the evaluation, the H-21B towed an LST at 5 kn (9.3 km/h; 5.8 mph) and a simulated tracked amphibious vehicle from the water to the beach. The uprated 1425 hp Wright engine used in the H-21B was also used in subsequent variants sold to both the U.S. Army (as the H-21C Shawnee) and the military forces of several other nations. In 1962, the H-21 was renamed the CH-21 in U.S. Army service.

In 1959 Vertol Aircraft, the new name for Piasecki Helicopters, came up with a concept for heavy lift over short distances where between two and six H-21Bs would be linked by beams to lift heavy loads. It was considered to be unsafe, because if one helicopter had mechanical problems during the lift it could unbalance the structure and cause all helicopters to crash.

== Operational history ==
=== French service in the Algerian War ===
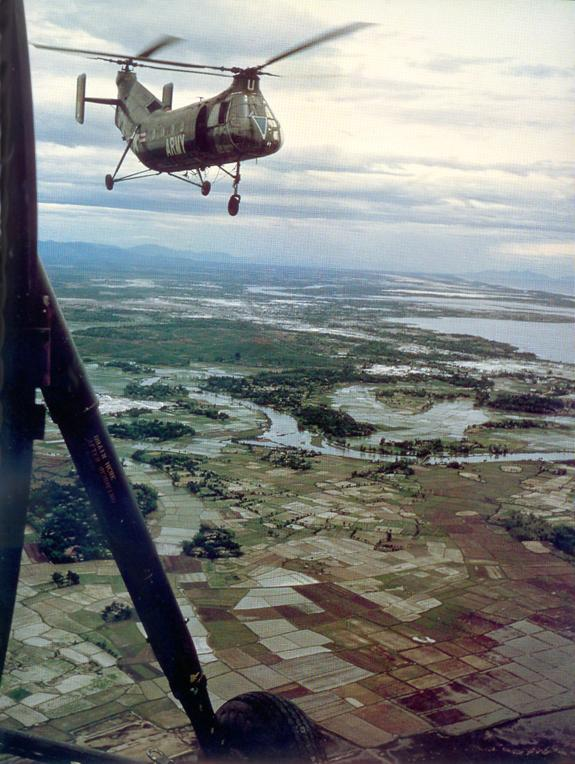
A Shawnee over rice paddies in Vietnam

In 1956, seeking a way to use helicopters for ground-attack in the Algerian War, the French Air Force and French Army Aviation (Aviation Légère de l'Armée de Terre) experimented with arming the Sikorsky S-55, then being superseded in service by the more capable Piasecki H-21 and Sikorsky H-34 helicopters. Some French Air Force and Army aviation H-21C helicopters were subsequently armed with fixed, forward-firing rockets and machine guns. A few even had racks for bombs but tests found that the H-21C lacked the maneuverability and performance needed for ground-attack. The H-21C was far more successful as a troop transport, and most H-21Cs in service were eventually fitted with flexible door-mounted guns such as the .50 cal. (12.7 mm) M2 Browning machine gun or the (ex-German) MG 151/20 20 mm aircraft autocannon, for defensive use when landing assault forces under fire.

Though the H-21 had been removed from ground-attack, official U.S. Army evaluations at the time indicated that the type was actually more likely to survive hits by ground fire than was the Sikorsky CH-34; this was assumed to be a consequence of the location and construction of the CH-34's fuel tanks. By the close of the Algerian War, troop-carrying H-21C helicopters were being used in concert with H-34 ground-attack helicopters in large counterinsurgency operations.

=== U.S. Army operations ===
The H-21C saw extensive service with the U.S. Army, primarily for use in transporting troops and supplies. On 24 August 1954, with the assistance of inflight refueling provided by a U.S. Army U-1A Otter, a H-21C known as Amblin' Annie became the first helicopter to cross the United States non-stop. Experiments were made by the Army in arming the H-21C as a gunship; some Shawnees were armed with flex guns under the nose, while others were fitted with door guns.

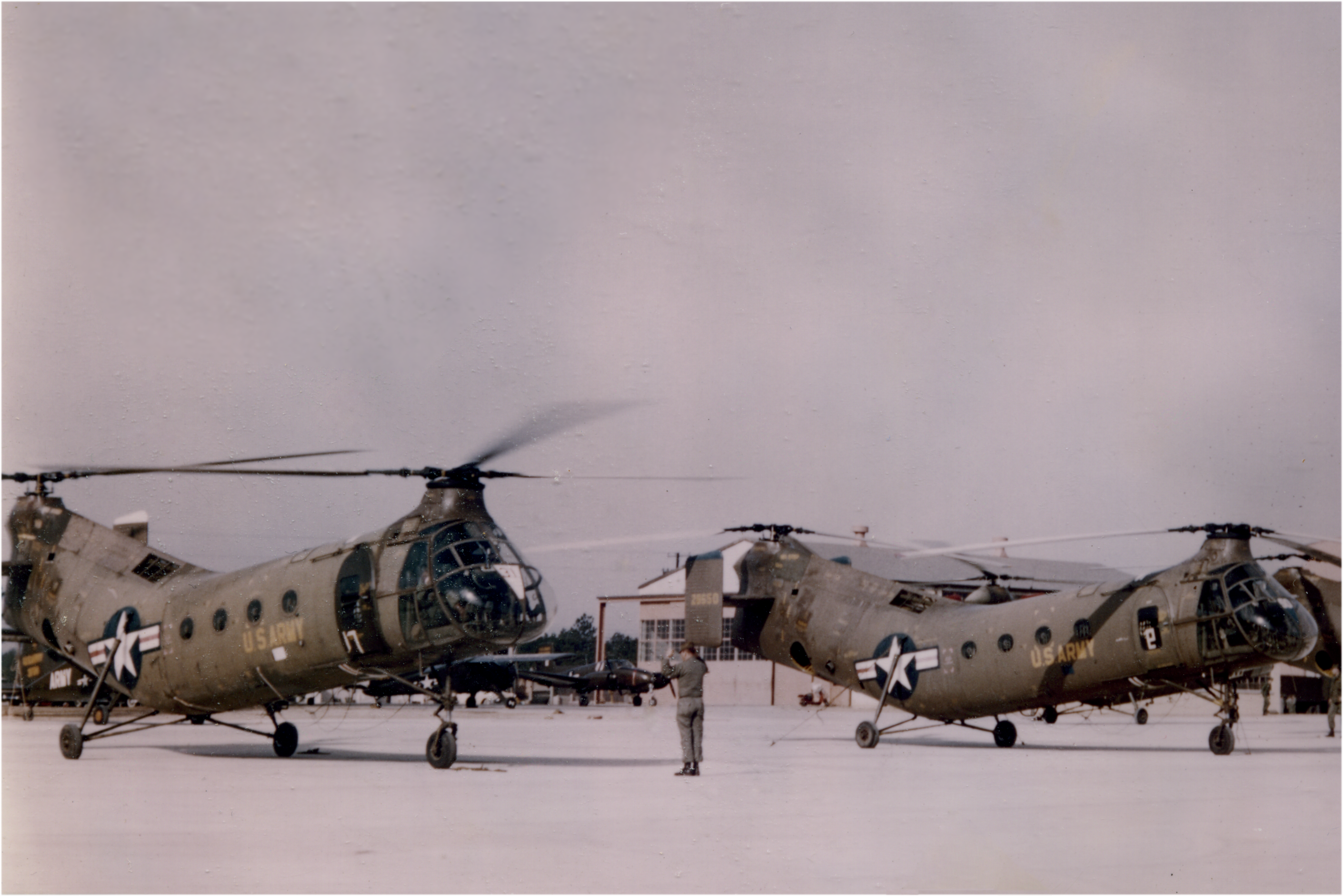
H-21 Shawnees of the 8th Transportation Company, Ft Bragg, 1956. The company had 24 helicopters, 48 officers and warrant officers, and 246 enlisted men.

One experimental version was tested with a Boeing B-29 Superfortress .50 cal. remote turret mounted beneath the nose. The H-21C (later designated CH-21C) was first deployed to South Vietnam in December 1961 with the Army's 8th and 57th Transportation Companies, in support of Army of the Republic of Vietnam troops. In Army service, the CH-21C Shawnee could be armed with 7.62 mm (.308 in) or 12.7 mm (.50 in) flexible door guns. Relatively slow, the CH-21's unprotected control cables and fuel lines proved vulnerable to the Vietcong, who were increasingly well supplied with automatic small arms and heavy (12.7 mm) anti-aircraft machine guns.

The H-21, which was designed for cold weather operations, performed poorly in the hot weather of Vietnam. Despite being capable of carrying 20 passengers, it could lift only nine when operating in Vietnam. Pilots reported that engines that were rated for 600 hours of flying time were lasting only 200 hours or less in Vietnam. The shooting down of a CH-21 Shawnee near the Laotian-Vietnamese border with the death of four aviators in July 1962 were some of the U.S. Army's earliest casualties in the Vietnam War. Despite these events, the Shawnee continued in service as the U.S. Army's helicopter workhorse in Vietnam until June 1964 when it was replaced with the Bell UH-1 Huey. In 1965, the Boeing CH-47 Chinook was deployed to Vietnam and later that year, most CH-21 helicopters were withdrawn from active inventory in the U.S. Army and Air Force.

== Variants ==
XH-21
USAF designation of the first H-21 prototype.
YH-21 Work Horse
USAF Search And Rescue (SAR) version of the HRP-2 for service test, eighteen built
H-21A Work Horse (Model 42)
Same as YH-21 with detailed changes and powered by one 1250hp Wright R-1820-102, re-designated CH-21A in 1962, 32 built for USAF, 6 for the Royal Canadian Air Force
H-21B Work Horse (Model 42)
Same as H-21A but with uprated Wright engine (1425hp) and seats for 20 troops, autopilot as standard and limited armour protection and external fuel tanks, became CH-21B in 1962, 163 built for U.S. forces. 10 built for Japanese Self-Defense Forces; 10 H-21B built for the French Navy.
SH-21B Work Horse
Rescue conversion of the H-21B, became HH-21B in 1962.
H-21C Shawnee (Model 43)
US Army version of the H-21B, became CH-21C in 1962, 334 built for U.S. forces. 32 built under license by Weser Flugzeugbau for the West German Army. 98 built for the French Air Force and French Army Aviation (ALAT).
XH-21D Shawnee (Model 71).
Two H-21Cs re-engined with two General Electric T58 turboshaft engines in place of the Wright R-1820. Not placed into production.
CH-21A
H-21A redesignated in 1962.
CH-21B
H-21B redesignated in 1962.
CH-21C
H-21C redesignated in 1962.
HH-21B
SH-21B redesignated in 1962.
CH-125
Vertol Canada Model 42
Model 42A
Conversion by Vertol Aircraft (Canada) of eight Royal Canadian Air Force H-21s for civilian use. Equipped to carry 19 passengers or 2,820lb (1,279kg) of internal cargo or a 5,000lb (2,268kg) slung load.
Model 44A
Commercial 19-passenger transport version of the H-21B. 11 total (Swedish military designation: Hkp 1), 2 for the Swedish Air Force, 9 for the Swedish Navy. 2 used for test/evaluation purposes by Japan Self-Defense Forces.
Model 44B
Commercial 15-passenger/freighter version of the H-21B.
Model 44C
Commercial eight-passenger executive version of the H-21B.
CH-127
Vertol Canada Model 44
Piasecki HkP1
Piasecki model 44 for the Swedish Navy

== Operators ==
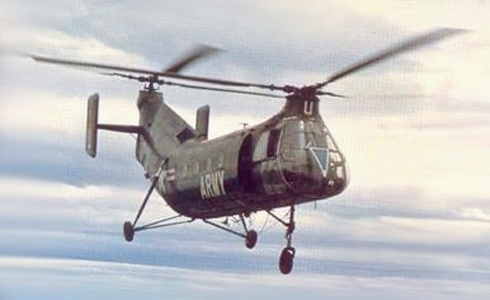
A US Army H-21 in flight

=== Former military operators ===
Canada

- Royal Canadian Air Force

France

- French Air Force
- French Army

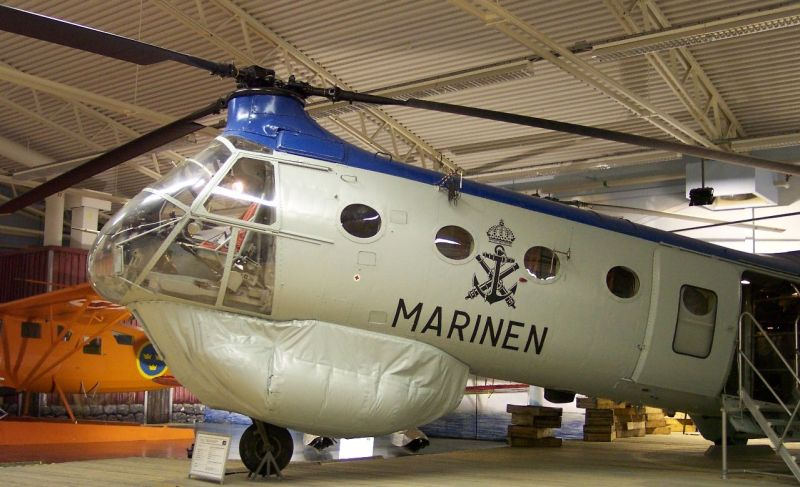
Hkp 1 in Swedish Navy markings

- French Navy

Japan

- Japan Air Self-Defense Force
- Japan Ground Self-Defense Force

Sweden

- Swedish Navy

United States

- United States Air Force
- United States Army

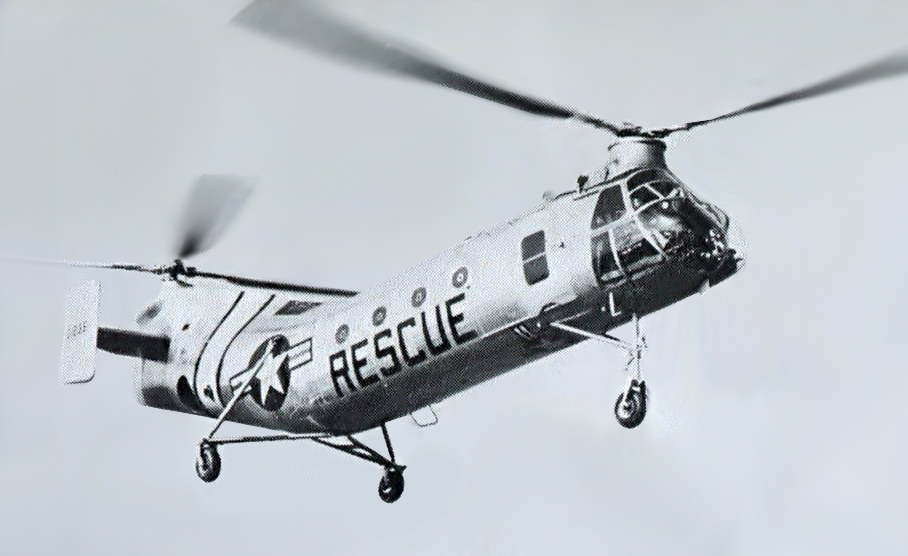
An HH-21 with US Air Force

West Germany

- West German Army

Zaire

- Zairean Air Force

=== Civil operators ===
United States

- New York Airways

== Aircraft on display ==
=== Canada ===
- 642 – On display at the Musée de la Défense aérienne of CFB Bagotville, Quebec
- 641 – On display at the Heritage Air Park of the Comox Air Force Museum CFB Comox, British Columbia

=== France ===
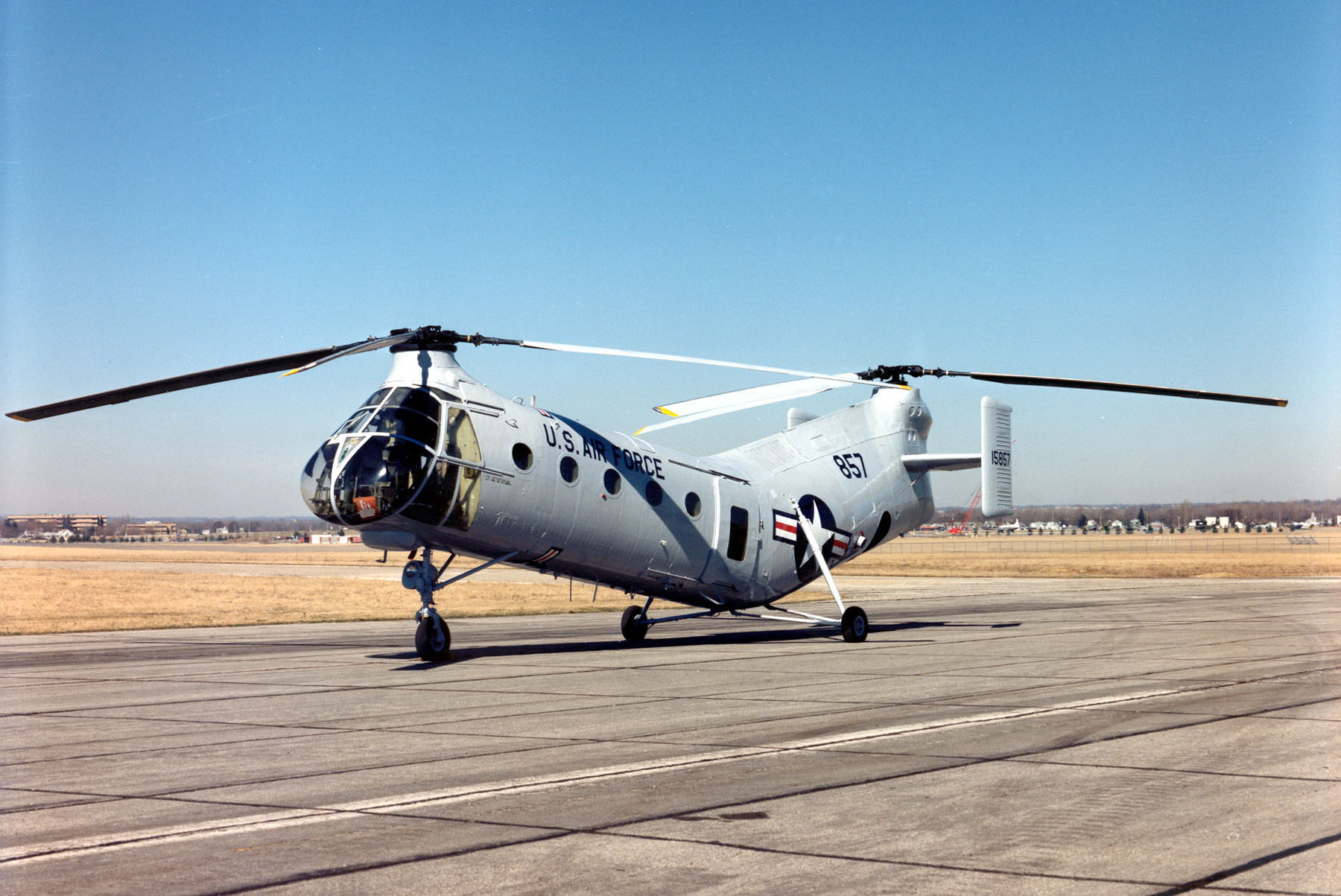
A USAF CH-21B at the National Museum of the United States Air Force

- FR94 – H-21C on static display at the Musée de l'Aviation Légere de l'Armée de Terre et de l'Hélicoptère in Dax, Landes.
- FR106 is on display at the "Ailes Anciennes" Museum at Toulouse-Blagnac Airport.

=== Germany ===
- 83+07 – H-21C on static display at the Hubschraubermuseum Bückeburg in Bückeburg, Lower Saxony.
- 83+08 – H-21C on static display at the Militärhistorisches Museum Flugplatz Berlin-Gatow in Berlin, Berlin.
- 83+11 – H-21C on static display at the Flugausstellung Hermeskeil in Hermeskeil, Rhineland-Palatinate.
- 83+17 – XH-21D on static display at the Auto & Technik Museum Sinsheim in Sinsheim, Baden-Württemberg.

=== Japan ===
- JG-0002 – Model 44A on static display at the Tokorozawa Aviation Museum in Tokorozawa, Saitama.
- 02-4756 – H-21B on static display at the JASDF Air Park in Hamamatsu, Shizuoka.

=== Russia ===
- N74056 – Model 44A on static display at Central Air Force Museum in Monino, Moscow.

=== Sweden ===
- 01001 – HKP 1 on static display at the Swedish Air Force Museum in Linköping, Östergötland.
- 01009 – HKP 1 on static display at the Gotland Museum of Defence in Tingstäde, Gotland.

=== United States ===
Airworthy

- 54-4001 – CH-21B airworthy at the Classic Rotors Museum in Ramona, California. This is the last H-21 still flown.

Static Display

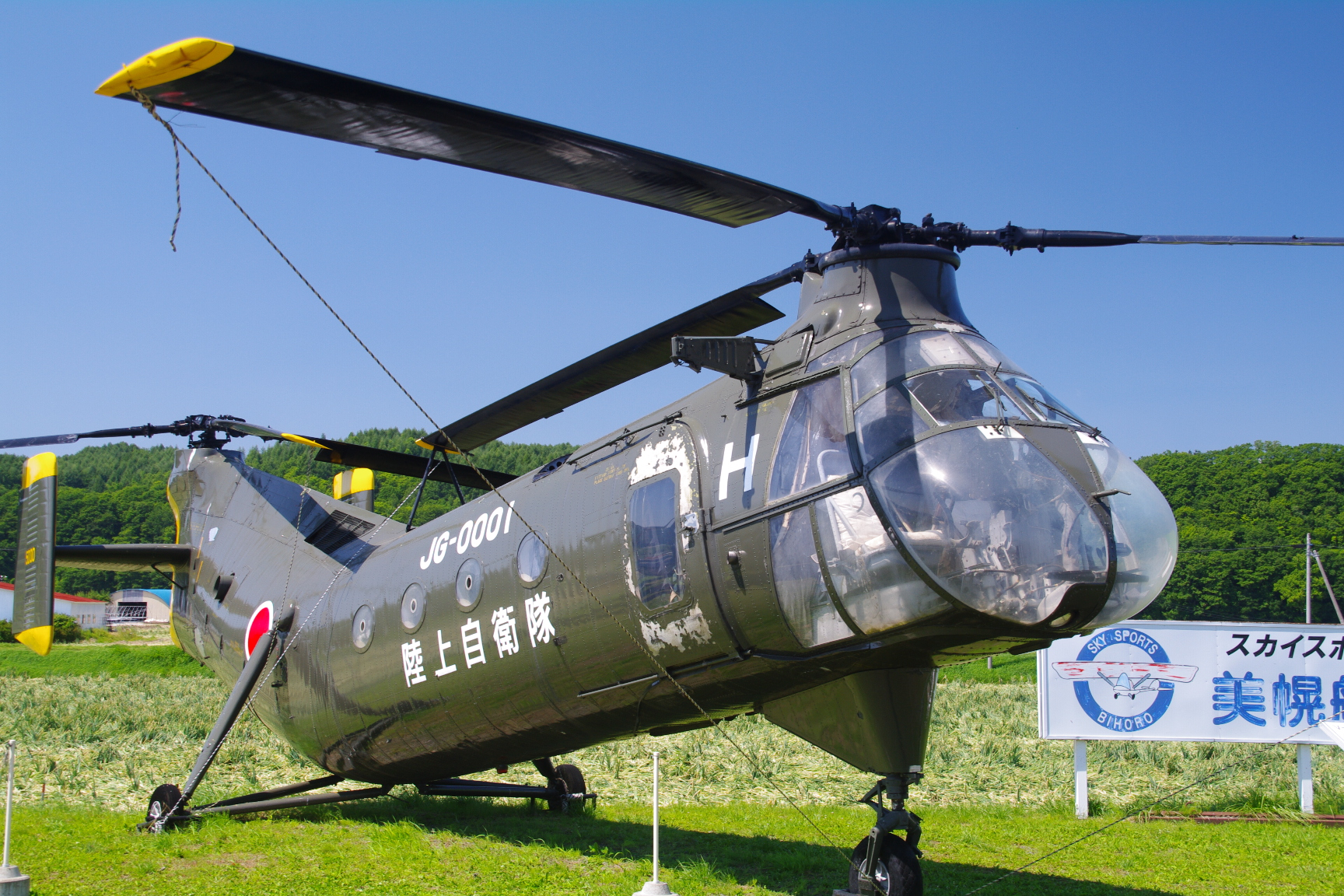
Model 44A with the JGSDF at Bihoro Aviation Park, August 2009

- 51-15857 – CH-21B on static display at the National Museum of the United States Air Force at Wright-Patterson AFB in Dayton, Ohio. It was obtained from Eglin Air Force Base in January 1965.
- 51-15859 – CH-21B on static display at Battleship Memorial Park in Mobile, Alabama.
- 51-15886 – CH-21C on static display at the Aerospace Museum of California at McClellan Airport (former McClellan AFB) in McClellan, California.
- 51-15892 – CH-21B on static display at the Quonset Air Museum at the former Naval Air Station Quonset Point in North Kingstown, Rhode Island.
- 52-8676 – CH-21B on static display at the Strategic Air Command & Aerospace Museum near Offutt AFB in Ashland, Nebraska.
- 52-8685 – CH-21B on static display at the Museum of Aviation at Robins AFB near Warner Robins, Georgia.
- 52-8688 – CH-21B on static display at the Travis Air Force Base Heritage Center near Fairfield, California.
- 52-8691/52-8706 – CH-21B on static display at Kirtland Air Force Base in Albuquerque, New Mexico. This airframe is a composite of two different airframes and is painted as 53-4343.
- 52-8696 – CH-21B on static display at Joint Base Elmendorf-Richardson near Anchorage, Alaska.
- 53-4323 – HH-21B on static display at Berryman War Memorial Park in Bridgeport, Washington.
- 53-4324 – CH-21B on static display at the Vintage Flying Museum in Fort Worth, Texas. This airframe was previously on display at the Pate Museum of Transportation in Cresson, Texas.
- 53-4326 – CH-21B on static display at the March Field Air Museum at March Air Reserve Base (former March AFB) in Riverside, California.
- 53-4347 – CH-21B on static display at the Pueblo Weisbrod Aircraft Museum in Pueblo, Colorado.
- 53-4354 – CH-21C on static display at the Arkansas Air & Military Museum in Fayetteville, Arkansas.
- 53-4362 – SH-21B on static display at the Alaska Museum of Transportation and Industry in Wasilla, Alaska.
- 53-4366 – CH-21B on static display at the Museum of Flight in Seattle, Washington.
- 53-4367 – CH-21B on static display at the Mid-Atlantic Air Museum, Reading, Pennsylvania.
- 53-4369 – CH-21B on static display at the United States Army Aviation Museum near Fort Rucker in Daleville, Alabama.
- 53-4389 – CH-21B on static display at the Pima Air & Space Museum adjacent to Davis-Monthan AFB in Tucson, Arizona.
- 54-4404 – CH-21B on static display at the Alaska Aviation Heritage Museum in Anchorage, Alaska.
- 55-4140 – CH-21C on static display at the American Helicopter Museum & Education Center in West Chester, Pennsylvania. This airframe was previously on display at the Intrepid Sea, Air & Space Museum in New York, New York.
- 55-4218 – CH-21C on static display at the Evergreen Aviation & Space Museum in McMinnville, Oregon. This airframe was previously on display at the Wings Over the Rockies Air and Space Museum at the former Lowry AFB in Denver, Colorado. It is painted as 53-4379.
- 56-2040 – CH-21C on static display at the United States Army Aviation Museum at Fort Novosel, near Daleville, Alabama.
- 56-2077 – CH-21C on static display at the U.S. Army Transportation Museum ay Fort Eustis near Newport News, Virginia.

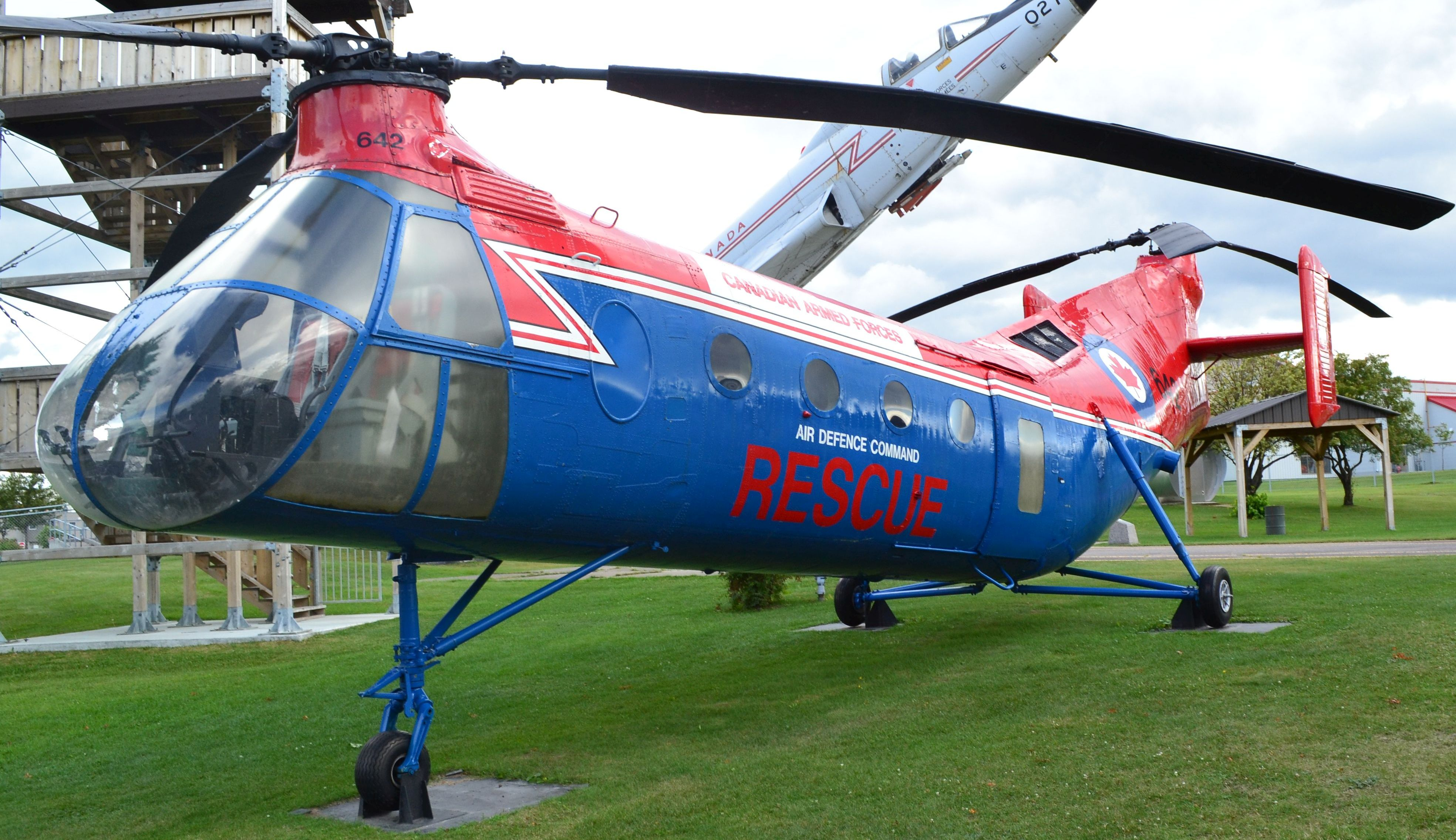
CH-21 in RCAF markings at the Canadian Museum of Flight

- 56-2142 – CH-21C on static display at the Hill Aerospace Museum at Hill AFB near Ogden, Utah. This airframe is painted as 54-4002.
- 56-2159 – CH-21C on static display at the Pima Air & Space Museum adjacent to Davis-Monthan AFB in Tucson, Arizona.

Stored or under restoration

- 52-8623 – CH-21B in storage at the Air Force Flight Test Museum at Edwards AFB in Edwards, California.
- 52-8683 – H-21B in storage with Basler Turbo Conversions in Oshkosh, Wisconsin.
- 53-4329 – CH-21B under restoration at the Museum of Flight Restoration Center at Paine Field in Everett, Washington.
- 54-4003 – CH-21B in storage at the American Helicopter Museum & Education Center in West Chester, Pennsylvania. This airframe was previously on display at the Florence Air & Missile Museum in Florence, South Carolina.
- c/n 438 – Model 44B in storage in unrestored condition at the Gillespie Field Annex of the San Diego Air & Space Museum in El Cajon, California.

== Specifications (CH-21C) ==
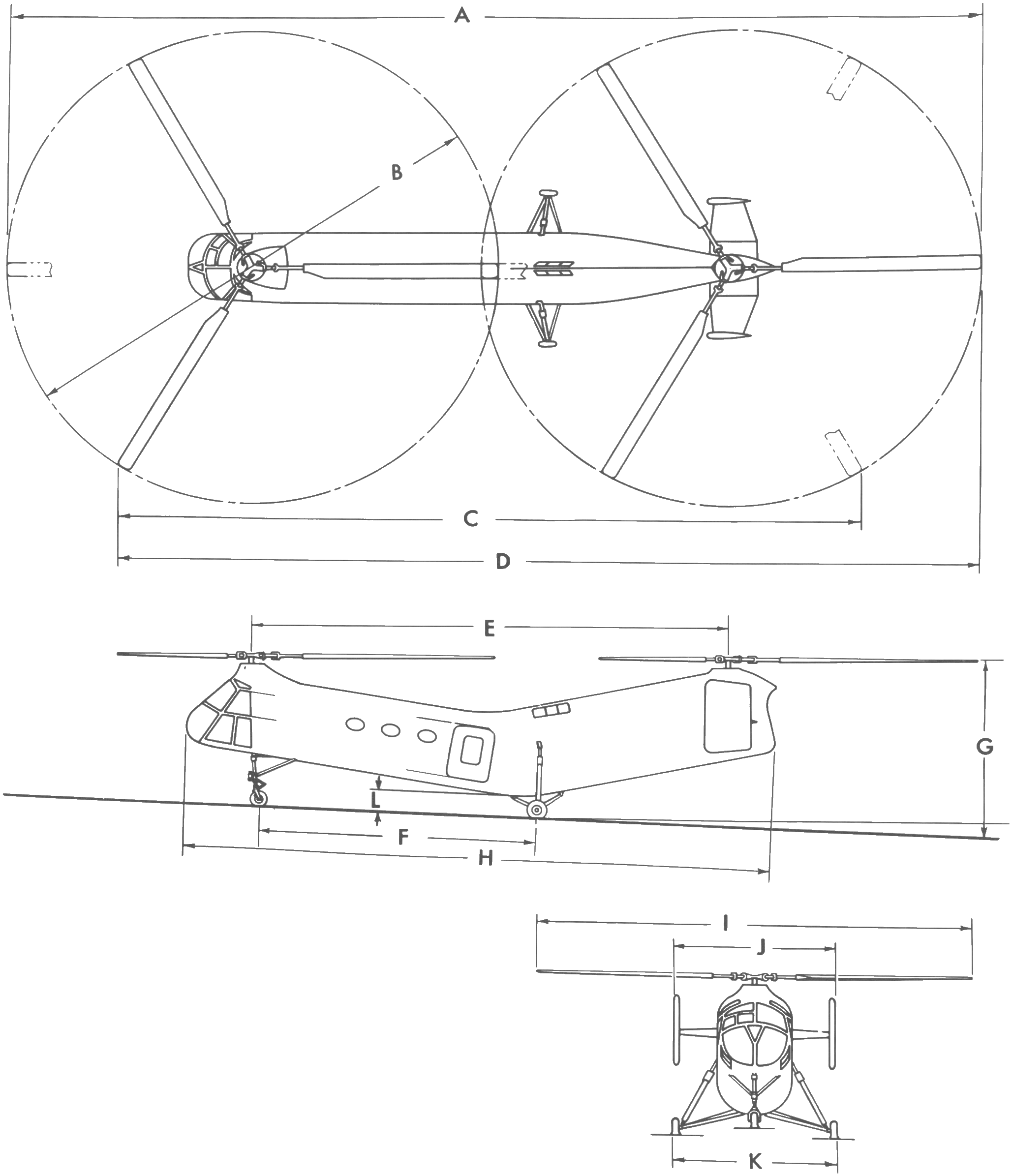
3-view line drawing of the Piasecki YH-21 Workhorse

Data from U.S. Army Aircraft Since 1947

General characteristics

- Crew: 3–5 (Pilot, co-pilot, crew chief and one or two gunners in Vietnam)
- Capacity: ** 20 troops or
  - 12 stretchers
- Length: 52 ft 6 in (16.00 m)
- Height: 15 ft 9 in (4.80 m)
- Empty weight: 8,950 lb (4,060 kg)
- Gross weight: 15,200 lb (6,895 kg)
- Powerplant: 1 × Wright R-1820-103 Cyclone 9-cylinder air-cooled radial piston engine, 1,425 hp (1,063 kW)
- Main rotor diameter: 2 × 44 ft 0 in (13.41 m)
- Main rotor area: 3,041 sq ft (282.5 m^{2}) * Blade section: – NACA 0012

Performance

- Maximum speed: 127 mph (204 km/h, 110 kn)
- Cruise speed: 98 mph (158 km/h, 85 kn)
- Range: 265 mi (426 km, 230 nmi)
- Service ceiling: 9,450 ft (2,880 m)
- Disk loading: 5 lb/sq ft (24 kg/m^{2})
- Power/mass: 0.09 hp/lb (0.15 kW/kg)

Armament

- Varying, but usually one or two .50 (12.7 mm) machine-guns, or 7.62 mm M60 machine guns.

== See also ==
Related development

- Piasecki HRP Rescuer
- Piasecki H-25
- Boeing Vertol CH-46 Sea Knight
- Boeing CH-47 Chinook

Aircraft of comparable role, configuration, and era

- Bristol Belvedere
- Yakovlev Yak-24

Related lists

- List of military aircraft of the United States
