= Piasecki Aircraft =

American aircraft producer

Piasecki Aircraft Corporation
- Industry: Aerospace
- Founded: 1955
- Founders: Frank Piasecki
- Headquarters: Essington, Pennsylvania
- Website: www.piasecki.com

The Piasecki Aircraft Corporation (PiAC) is a manufacturer of aircraft, principally advanced rotorcraft. It was founded by American vertical flight pioneer Frank Piasecki to develop compound helicopters and other advanced rotorcraft after he was ousted from the leadership of his first company, Piasecki Helicopter.

== History ==
The company's origins dated back to 1936 with the formation of the P-V Engineering Forum in 1940 and it was renamed the Piasecki Helicopter Corporation in 1946. After a falling-out with other owners, Frank Piasecki and some of his design team left to form Piasecki Aircraft Corporation in 1955.

The Piasecki Aircraft Corporation is based in Essington, Pennsylvania and is run by Frank Piasecki's sons; Frederick Weyerhaeuser Piasecki is chairman and John Weyerhaeuser Piasecki is president and CEO.

In 2005, the company was selected by the United States Army as the prime contractor for two Future Combat Systems (FCS) unmanned aerial vehicle (UAV) systems The FCS Class III UAV system contract was awarded to the company in late 2006 following a competitive downselect of four competing technologies. As part of that effort, the company flew the world's first autonomous autogyro.

The company was the successful bidder when the US Navy's Naval Air Systems Command awarded a demonstration contract to serve as a testbed to validate the "Vectored Thrust Ducted Propeller" system. Piasecki developed and flight-tested the X-49 experimental compound helicopter, with its first flight in 2007, later completing all Phase 1 requirements.

Piasecki bid on the Future Vertical Lift program, but was not chosen when that project moved into its Joint Multi-Role Technology Demonstrator (JMR-TD) phase in 2013.

In December 2018, Piasecki announced Air Scout unmanned air system (UAS), it is designed to meet emerging cargo logistics requirements consistent with UAS Classification Group 3. Air Scout is sized at 300lbs, with payload potential of 50-150 lbs.

In 2021, the Telemedicine and Advanced Technology Research Center adopted Piasecki's Mobile Multiple Mission Module (M4) as their research asset. M4 was designed to accommodate cargo, patients, troops or a combination of any of these with its rapidly reconfigurable interior. It was planned to be flown using the Aerial Reconfigurable Embedded System (ARES) in 2023.

Piasecki is working for the PA-890, an electric powered helicopter with targets for lower operating cost, reduced noise, and zero direct emissions. The airport is featured in the March/April 2021 Vertiflite magazine.

== Products ==
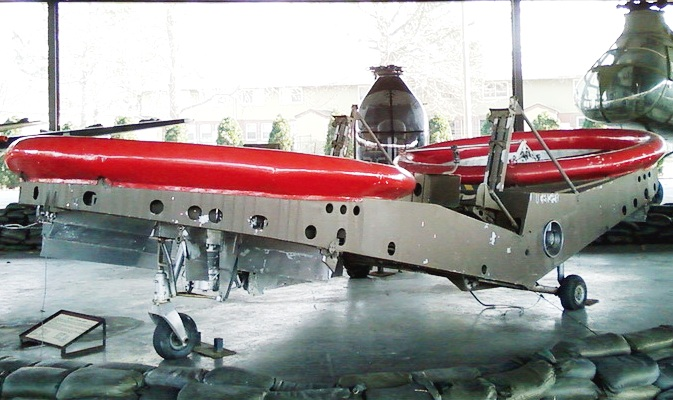
Piasecki VZ-8 Airgeep on display at the U.S. Army Transportation Museum.

Model name	First flight	Number built	Type
Piasecki PA-59 Airgeep	1959	2	Prototype "flying jeep"
Piasecki 16H Pathfinder	1962		Experimental compound helicopter
Piasecki PA-39	N/A	0	Unbuilt heavy-lift quad rotor helicopter
Piasecki PA-97	1986	1	Experimental heavy-lift helistat
Piasecki X-49	2007	1	Experimental compound helicopter
Expendable Airlift Glider Expeditionary Logistics System (EAGELS)	N/A		Experimental unmanned glider aircraft used for military transport
Air Scout	N/A		Unmanned rotorcraft
Piasecki Turais	2013		Unmanned air-launched surveillance UAV
Piasecki ARES	2024	1	Modular multi-mission tilt-duct VTOL UAV

== See also ==
- Piasecki Helicopter
