= American Helicopter Museum =

Aerospace museum in West Chester, US

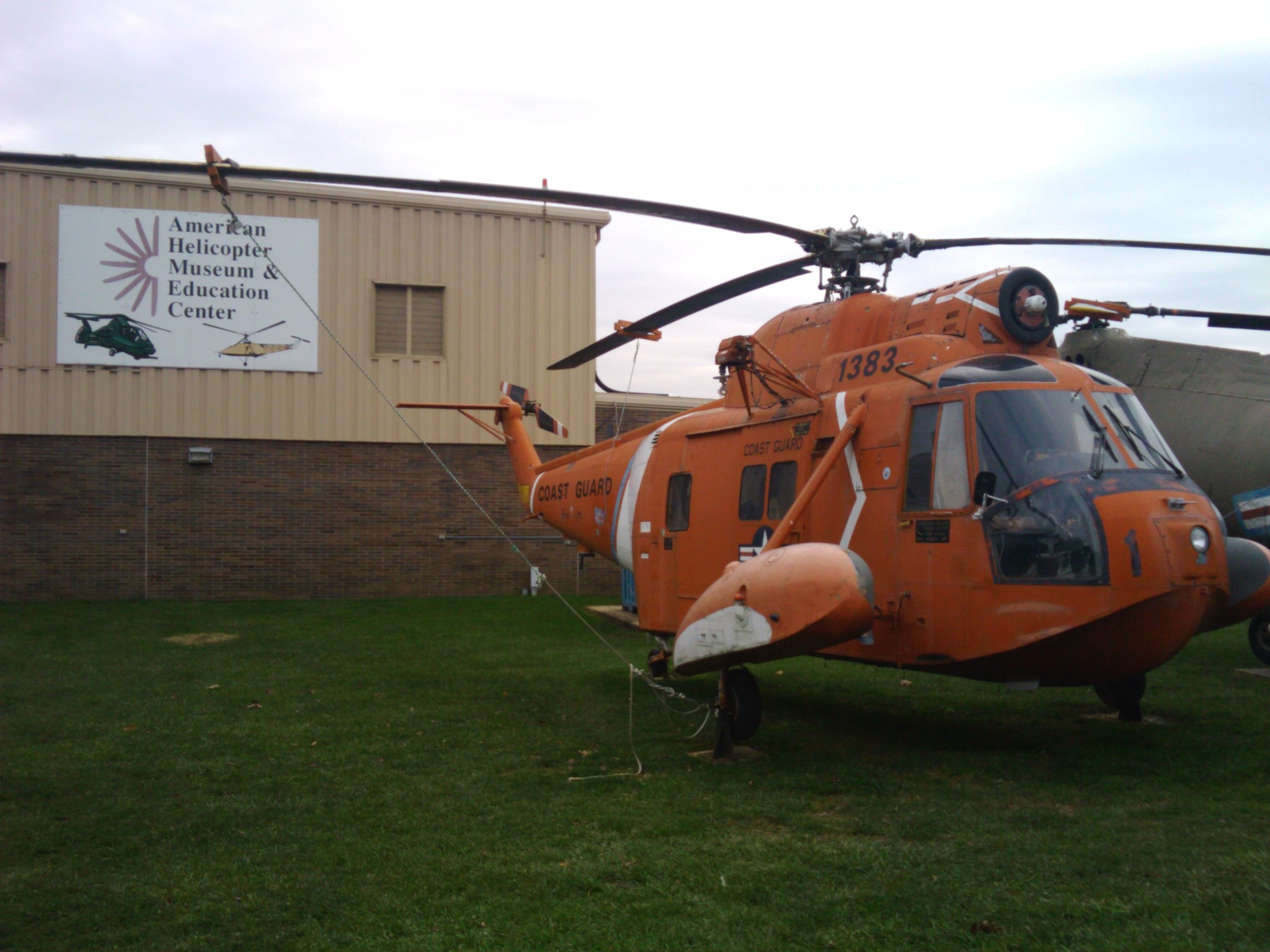
- Established: October 1996
- Location: 1220 American Boulevard; West Chester, Pennsylvania, United States
- Coordinates: 39.992°N 75.579°W
- Type: Aviation and History
- Visitors: 30,000
- Founders: Bob Beggs and Peter Wright Sr.
- Director: Paul Kahan
- Public transit access: SEPTA Route 92
- Website: helicoptermuseum.org

The American Helicopter Museum & Education Center (AHMEC) is located at 1220 American Boulevard, West Chester, Pennsylvania, United States. The transport museum focuses on rotary-wing aviation history, science and technology. The collection contains over 40 civilian and military autogyros, convertiplanes, and helicopters, including some early-generation models. The museum also has an extensive research library, the Renzo Pierpaoli Memorial Library, which contains documents, artifacts, films, and memoirs that museum members can use.

The museum strives to restore and display historic aircraft and chronicle the origin and development of rotary-wing aircraft. The museum's exhibits chronicle the efforts of pioneers like Harold Frederick Pitcairn, Mr. W. Wallace Kellett of Kellett Autogiro, Arthur M. Young and Frank Piasecki, and today it continues to record the new and ever-expanding role of the U.S. helicopter industry. The exhibits span the history of rotary-wing aircraft from the earliest rotorcraft to the latest developments in tiltrotor. AHMEC is one of only two museums in the world currently displaying a V-22 Osprey.

== History ==
The American Helicopter Museum & Education Center opened to the public in October 1996. The museum was founded by Peter Wright, a veteran of the Flying Tigers, a founder of Keystone Helicopter Corporation, and sales manager of Helicopter Air Transport. In 2003, the Robinson Helicopter Company donated $1 million to the museum. The museum's UH-1H was transported to the Lumley Aviation Center at the Pennsylvania College of Technology in December 2009 for restoration.

== Programs ==
The Museum hosts thousands of visitors, school groups, families, and senior citizens each year. Tourists of all ages from the U.S. and abroad come here to witness the history and future of the helicopter.

- Stubby, the educational traveling helicopter.

Stubby is an interactive helicopter that travels to schools, camps, and community events. Docents accompanying Stubby give kids a chance to sit in the cockpit, operate the controls, and learn how each works. Students also learn about the hand-eye coordination necessary to fly a helicopter. Stubby is a Hughes TH-55A Osage with shortened rotor blades and a tail boom to facilitate transport. The museum acquired it in 1998.

- Girls in Science & Technology

According to a brochure, the Girls in Science & Technology program engages young girls to look toward science and technology in fun and exciting ways and to mentor and encourage their future career and growth opportunities in technology.

Industry partners develop and teach the curriculum and guidelines, and stratify them for appropriate age groups. The project focuses and channels the interests of girls in grades 4 to 12 in engineering, computer programming, aerospace technologies, math, and flight. The program's initial focus is on four categories related to Aerospace: The Physics of Flight, Rotorcraft Design, Decreasing Size and Computerization of Controls, and Robotic Flight.

- Summer Camp

A variety of 5-day workshops are offered, designed to make science and art fun and interesting.

== Aircraft on display ==
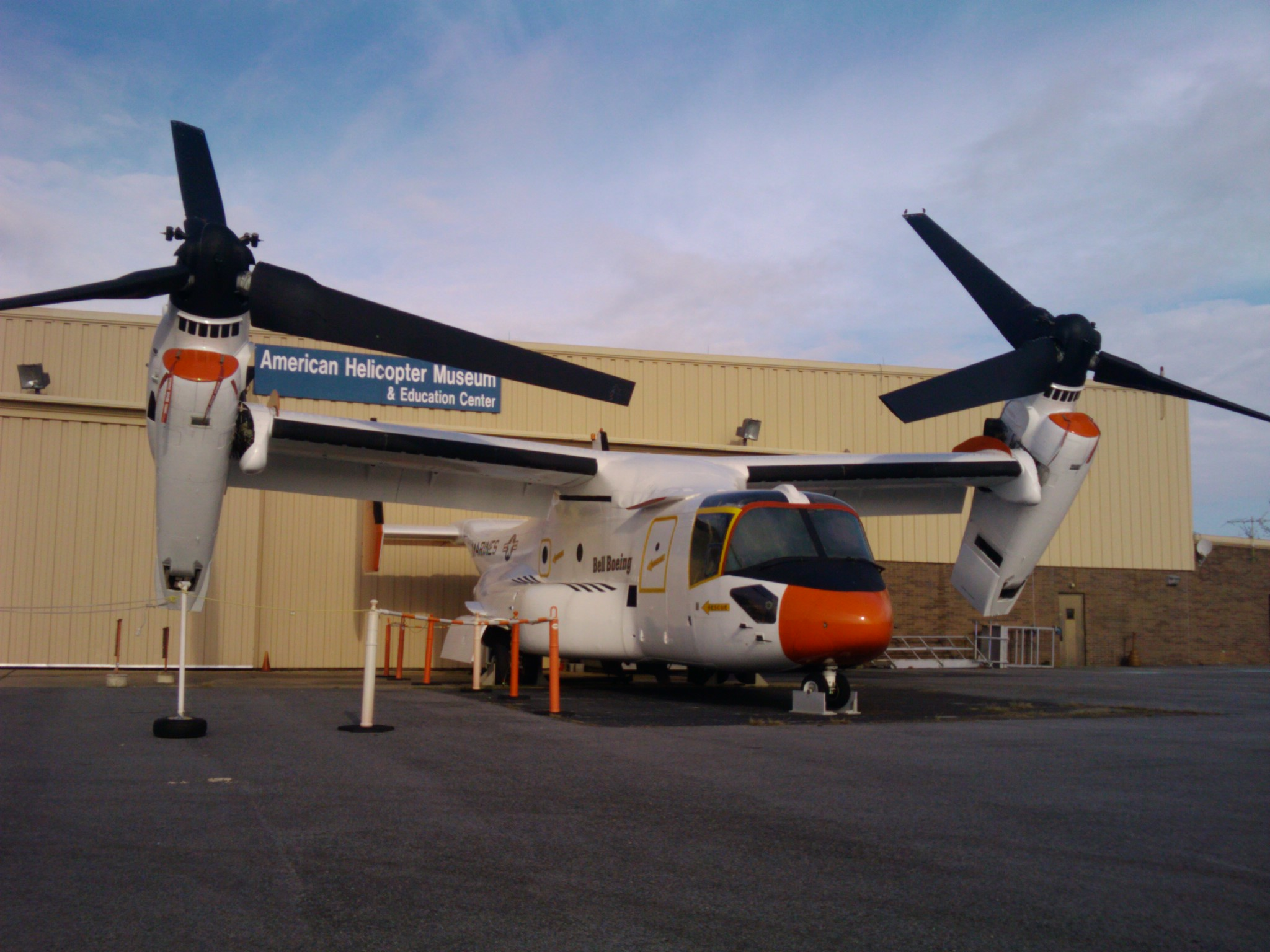
V-22 Osprey

Notable Interior Displays

- Bell 47D-1 / H-13D Sioux
- AeroVelo Atlas Human -powered helicopter
- Boeing HH-47 CSAR-X (Mockup)
- Hughes MD 530F / MH-6J Little Bird
- Hughes 369 (OH-6 / OH-6A) Cayuse
- Piasecki PV-14 / HUP-2 Retriever

Exterior Displays

- Kaman K-20 / HH-2D Seasprite
- Sikorsky S-61 / HH-3 Sea King
- Sikorsky S-62 / HH-52 Sea Guardian
- Bell AH-1F Cobra
- Bell TH-IL Huey
- V-22 Osprey - prototype on display as an example of a military tiltrotor.

== See also ==
- Classic Rotors Museum, California, USA
- The Helicopter Museum, Somerset, England
- Hubschraubermuseum Bückeburg, Germany
- National Helicopter Museum, Connecticut, USA
- List of aerospace museums
