= Piasecki 16H Pathfinder =

American experimental compound helicopter

16H Pathfinder
- Piasecki 16H-1 Pathfinder

General information
- Type: Experimental high-speed helicopter
- Manufacturer: Piasecki Aircraft
- Primary user: United States Army

History
- First flight: 21 February 1962 (16H-1); 15 November 1965 (16H-1A)

The Piasecki 16H was a series of compound helicopters produced in the 1960s. The first version of the Pathfinder, the -1 version, first flew in 1962. The similar but larger Pathfinder II, the 16H-1A, was completed in 1965.

== Variants ==
Model 16H-1 Pathfinder
one PWC PT6B-2 with one 405 shp turboshaft engine
Model 16H-1A Pathfinder II
larger version with one 1,250 shp (930 kW) T58-GE-8
Model 16H-1C Pathfinder III
proposed conversion of the 16H-1A with one 1,500 shp (1,100 kW) T58-GE-5
Model 16H-3J
nine-seat development, not built.

== Specifications (16H-1A) ==
Piasecki's 16H-1A Pathfinder II

Data from U.S. Army Aircraft Since 1947

General characteristics

- Crew: two pilots
- Capacity: up to six passengers
- Length: 37 ft 3 in (11.4 m)
- Wingspan: 32 ft 10 in (10.0 m)
- Height: 11 ft 4 in (3.45 m)
- Empty weight: 4,800 lb (2,165 kg)
- Gross weight: 10,800 lb (4,870 kg)
- Powerplant: 1 × General Electric T58-GE-8 turboshaft , 1,250 hp (930 kW)
- Main rotor diameter: 44 ft 0 in (13.4 m)

Performance

- Maximum speed: 230 mph (370 km/h, 200 kn)
- Cruise speed: 175 mph (280 km/h, 152 kn)
- Range: 950 mi (1,530 km, 830 nmi)
- Service ceiling: 18,700 ft (5,700 m)

== See also ==
Aircraft of comparable role, configuration, and era

- Piasecki X-49
- VFW-Fokker H3 Sprinter

Related lists

- List of rotorcraft
