= Piasecki H-16 Transporter =

1953 US military helicopter prototype

H-16 / PV-15 Transporter
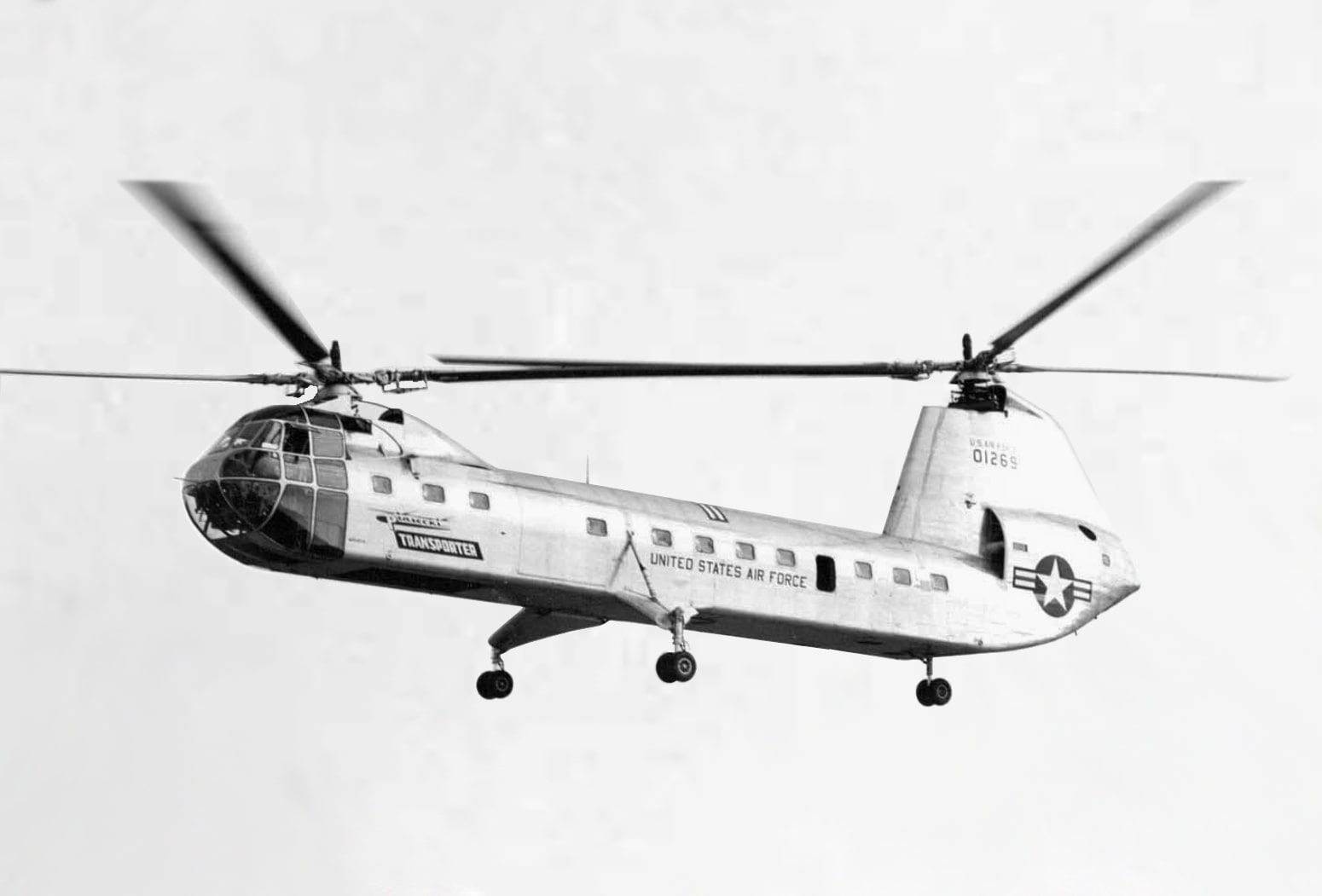
- The US Air Force prototype Piasecki YH-16A Transporter.

General information
- Type: Tandem-rotor transport helicopter
- National origin: United States
- Manufacturer: Piasecki Helicopter
- Number built: 2

History
- First flight: 23 October 1953

The Piasecki H-16 Transporter (company designation PV-15) was a tandem-rotor transport or rescue helicopter designed by Frank Piasecki and built by Piasecki Helicopter. The prototypes were evaluated by the United States Air Force and Army, but the crash of the second test aircraft led to cancelling the project.

== Design and development ==
Given the company designation PV-15, the tandem-rotor helicopter was designed by company founder Frank Piasecki. The design was publicly shown for the first time on 15 September 1953 at the Philadelphia airport.

== Operational history ==
=== Crash ===
On 5 January 1956, the second YH-16 test aircraft crashed while returning to Philadelphia from a test flight over New Jersey. The cause of the crash was later determined to be the aft slip ring, which carried flight data from the instrumented rotor blades to the data recorders in the cabin. The slip ring bearings seized, and the resultant torque load severed the instrumentation standpipe inside the aft rotor shaft. A segment of this steel standpipe tilted over and came into contact with the interior of the aluminum rotor shaft, scribing a deepening groove into it. The rotor shaft eventually failed in flight, which in turn led to the aft blades and forward blades desynchronizing and colliding.

The aircraft was a total loss; the two test pilots, Harold Peterson and George Callahan, were killed. This led to the cancellation not only of the YH-16, but also the planned 69-passenger YH-16B version.

== Variants ==
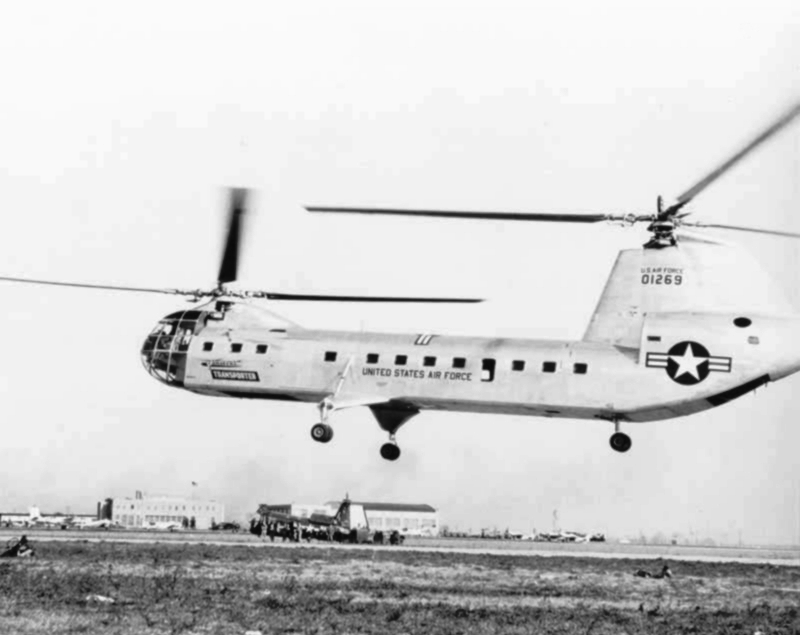
Another view of the first YH-16A prototype

XH-16/YH-16
Powered by two Pratt & Whitney R-2180-E Twin Wasp E radial engines and room for 43 troops, one built later converted to a YH-16B.
YH-16A
Powered by two Allison T38-A-10 1,800 shp turboshaft engines; previously designated XH-27.
YH-16B
Prototype XH-16A re-engined with two Allison T56-A-5 2,100 shp turboshaft engines.

== Specifications (YH-16B) ==
3-view line drawing of the Piasecki H-16A Transporter

Data from U.S. Army Aircraft Since 1947

General characteristics

- Crew: 3 (2 pilots and flight engineer)
- Capacity: 47 troops or 38 stretchers and 5 attendants
- Length: 77 ft 7 in (23.65 m)
- Height: 25 ft 0 in (7.62 m)
- Empty weight: 25,450 lb (11,544 kg)
- Gross weight: 45,700 lb (20,729 kg)
- Powerplant: 2 × Allison T56-A-5 turboshafts, 2,100 shp (1,600 kW) each
- Main rotor diameter: 2 × 82 ft (25 m)
- Main rotor area: 10,562 sq ft (981.2 m^{2})

Performance

- Maximum speed: 156 mph (251 km/h, 136 kn)
- Cruise speed: 125 mph (201 km/h, 109 kn)
- Range: 216 mi (348 km, 188 nmi)
- Service ceiling: 15,600 ft (4,800 m)

== See also ==
Related development

- Piasecki H-21
- Piasecki H-25

Aircraft of comparable role, configuration, and era

- Yakovlev Yak-24

Related lists

- List of United States Navy aircraft designations (pre-1962)
