= Jetmore Municipal Airport =

- IATA: none; ICAO: none; FAA LID: K79

Summary
- Airport type: Public
- Owner: City of Jetmore
- Serves: Jetmore, Kansas
- Elevation AMSL: 2,467 ft (752 m)
- Coordinates: 37°59′04″N 099°53′40″W
- Interactive map of Jetmore Municipal Airport

Runways
Direction	Length		Surface
Direction	ft	m	Surface
17/35	4,205	1,282	Asphalt/concrete

Statistics (2020)
- Aircraft operations (year ending 9/25/2020): 600
- Source: Federal Aviation Administration

Jetmore Municipal Airport (FAA LID: K79) is a city-owned, public-use airport seven miles south of Jetmore, a city in Hodgeman County, Kansas, United States.

== Facilities and aircraft ==
Jetmore Municipal Airport covers an area of 1,181 acres (478 ha) at an elevation of 2,467 feet (752 m) above mean sea level. It has one runway designated 17/35 with an asphalt/concrete surface measuring 4,205 by 75 feet (1,282 x 23 m). For the 12-month period ending September 25, 2020, the airport had 600 general aviation aircraft operations, an average of 50 per month.

== See also ==
- List of airports in Kansas
