= Tandem-rotor aircraft =

Helicopter with two horizontal rotor assemblies

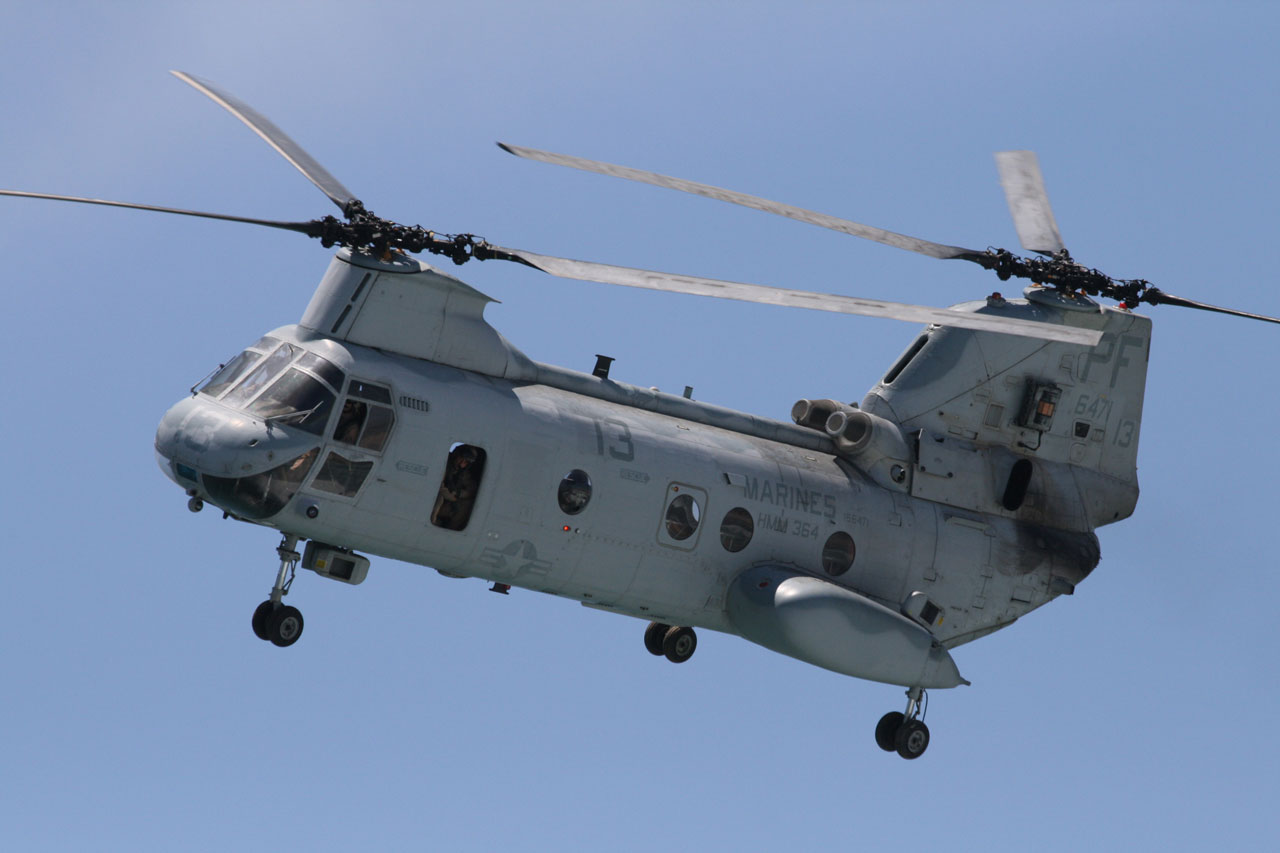
Boeing Vertol CH-46 Sea Knight

Animation of the rotors spinning

A tandem-rotor aircraft is an aircraft with two large helicopter rotor assemblies mounted one in front of the other in the horizontal plane. This configuration is mainly used for large cargo helicopters.

== Design ==
Single-rotor helicopters need a mechanism to neutralize the yawing movement produced by the single large rotor. This is commonly accomplished by a tail rotor, coaxial rotors, and the NOTAR systems. Tandem-rotor helicopters, however, use counter-rotating rotors, with each cancelling out the other's torque. Therefore, all of the power from the engines can be used for lift, whereas a single-rotor helicopter uses some of the engine power to counter the torque. An alternative is to mount two rotors in a coaxial configuration. The first successful tandem-rotor helicopter was built by Nicolas Florine in 1927.

Advantages of the tandem rotor system are a larger center of gravity range and good longitudinal stability. Disadvantages of the tandem rotor system are a complex transmission and the need for two large rotors.

The two rotors are linked by a transmission that ensures the rotors are synchronized and do not hit each other, even during an engine failure.

Tandem-rotor designs achieve yaw by applying opposite left and right cyclic to each rotor, effectively pulling both ends of the helicopter in opposite directions. To achieve pitch, opposite collective is applied to each rotor; decreasing the lift produced at one end, while increasing lift at the opposite end, effectively tilting the helicopter forward or back.

Tandem-rotor helicopters have the advantage of being able to hold more weight with shorter blades, since there are two sets. However, the rear rotor works in the aerodynamic shadow of the front rotor, which reduces its efficiency. This loss can be minimized by increasing the distance between the two rotor hubs, and by elevating one hub over the other. Tandem-rotor helicopters tend to have a lower disk loading than single-rotor helicopters.

Tandem-rotor helicopters typically require less power to hover and achieve low-speed flight as compared to single-rotor helicopters. Both configurations typically require the same power to achieve high-speed flight.

== Examples ==
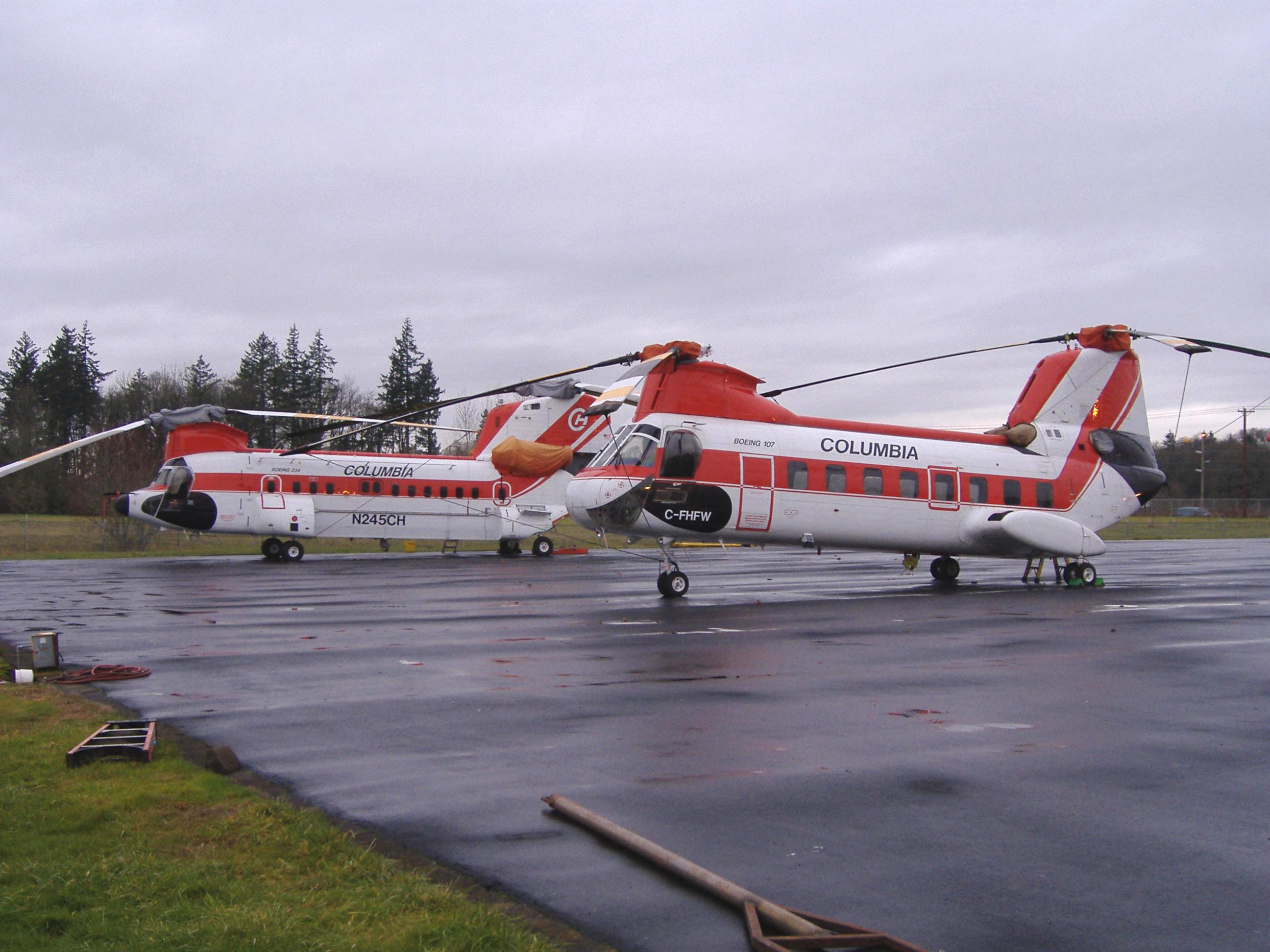
Columbia Helicopters Boeing Vertol 107-II and Boeing 234

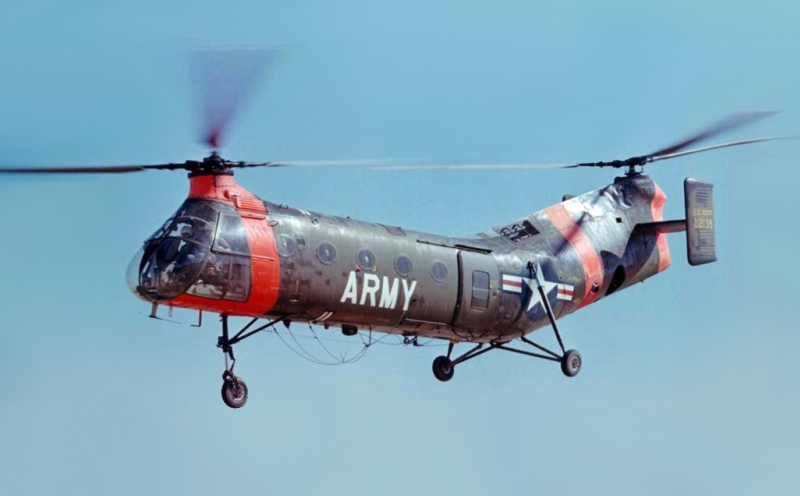
A Piasecki H-21B in the early 1960s

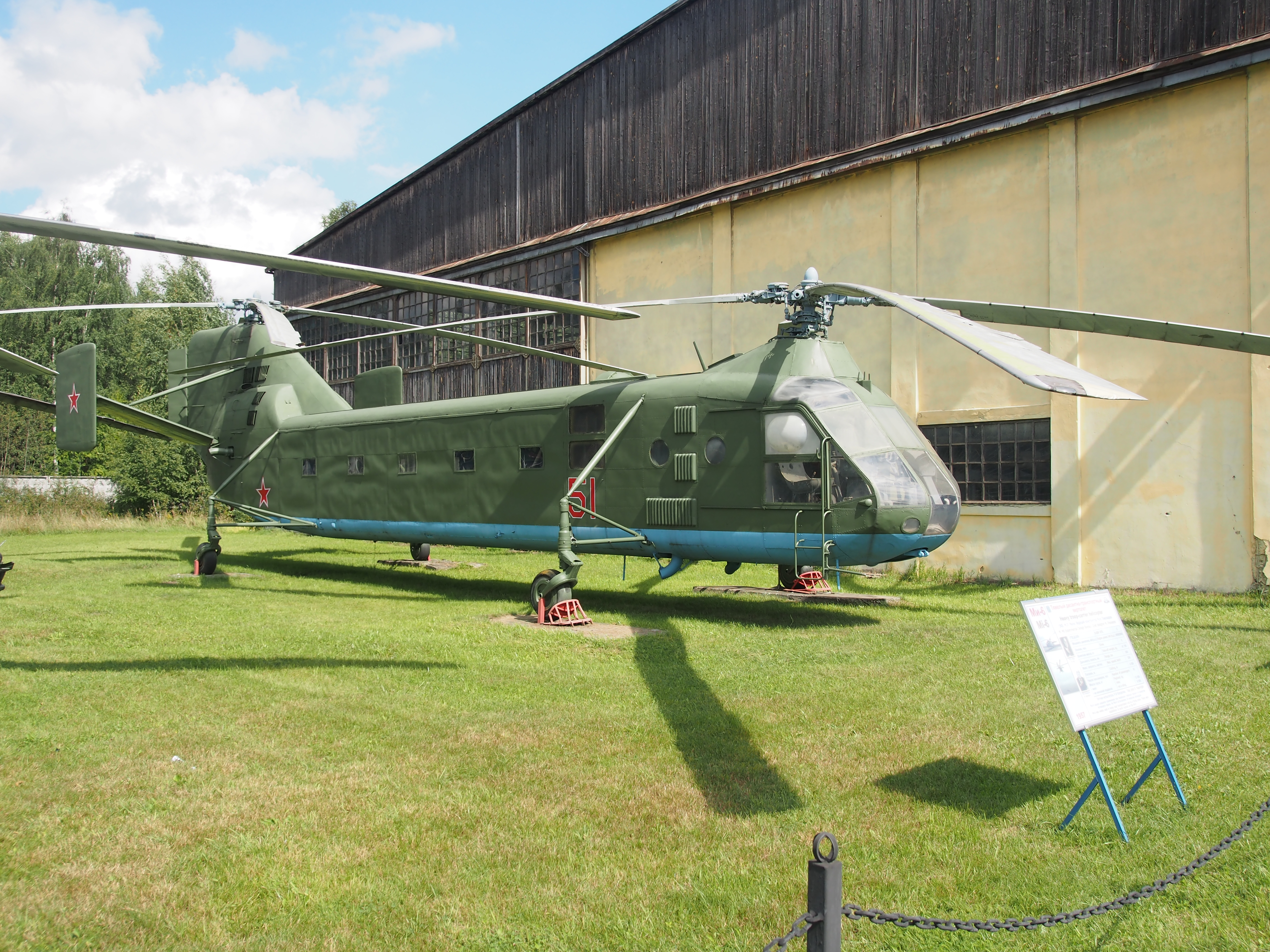
A Yakovlev Yak-24 at Central Air Force Museum

- Bell HSL (1953)
- Boeing CH-47 Chinook (1961) - most-produced tandem-rotor helicopter (over 1,200 built)
- Boeing Model 360 (1987)
- Boeing Vertol 107-II (1958)
  - Boeing Vertol CH-46 Sea Knight (1960), military version of Vertol 107-II
- Boeing Vertol XCH-62 (1970s - not completed)
- Boeing Vertol Model 234 (1981)
- Brantly B2J10 (1967)
- Bristol Belvedere (1958)
- Bristol Type 173 (1952)
- Chu CJC-3 (1952)
- Del Mar DH-20 (1968)
- Filper Beta 200 (1966)
- Filper Beta 400 (1967)
- Filper Helicopter (1965)
- HERC JOV-3 (1948)
- Hunt Rotary Aeroplane (1910)
- Jovair Sedan 4A (1963)
- McCulloch MC-4 (1951)
- Piasecki H-16 (1953)
- Piasecki H-21 (1949)
- Piasecki H-25/HUP Retriever (1952)
- Piasecki HRP Rescuer (1945)
- Piasecki PV-14 (1948)
- Rotorcraft XR-11 (1947)
- Yakovlev Yak-24 (1952)

== See also ==
- Coaxial-rotor aircraft
- Intermeshing-rotor helicopter
- Rotorcraft
- Tiltrotor
- Transverse-rotor aircraft
