= Yakovlev Yak-24 =

Transport helicopter in the USSR

Yak-24
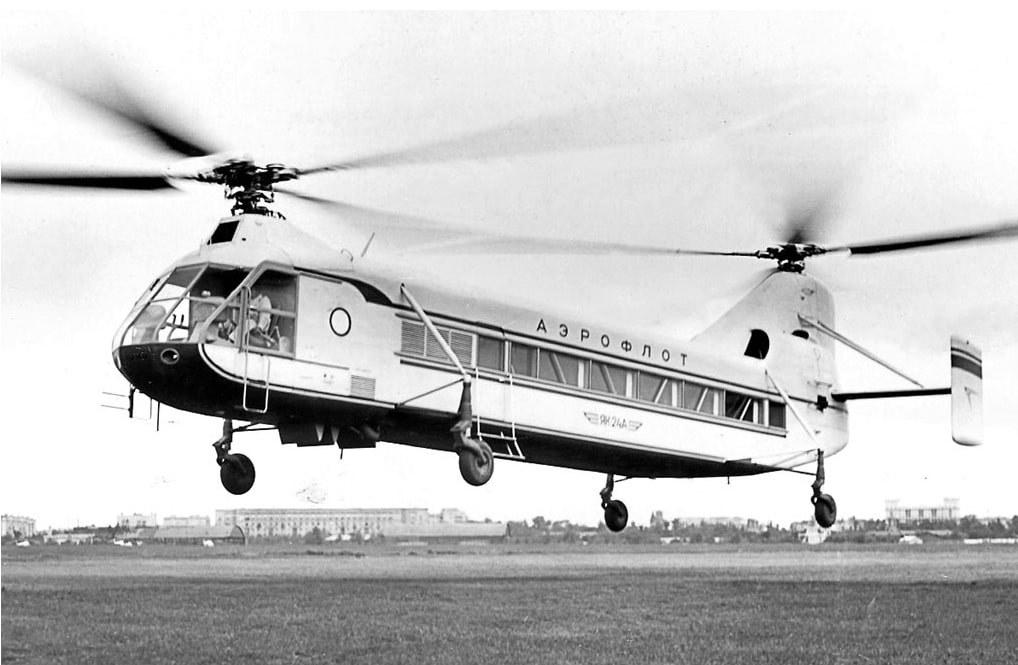
- A Yak-24A in Aeroflot livery

General information
- Type: Transport helicopter
- National origin: Soviet Union
- Manufacturer: Yakovlev
- Status: Retired
- Primary users: Soviet Air Force Aeroflot
- Number built: 40–100

History
- Manufactured: 1956–?
- Introduction date: 1955
- First flight: 3 July 1952

The Yakovlev Yak-24 (NATO reporting name "Horse") is a Soviet twin-engine, tandem rotor, transport helicopter developed by the Yakovlev Design Bureau in the 1950s. The Yak-24 saw limited use in the Soviet Air Force, and the exact number produced and duration of service are unknown due to inconsistencies in data.

== Design and development ==
In September 1951, following a meeting of Joseph Stalin with senior aircraft designers the Soviet Union issued two design specifications for helicopters, with the intent of rapidly accelerating Soviet helicopter development. The requirement for a medium-sized helicopter which could transport 12 people was issued to the Mil Design Bureau, which would result in the Mil Mi-4, while the requirement for a larger helicopter capable of transporting 24 people was given to the Yakovlev Design Bureau under Alexander Yakovlev. Prototypes of both types had to be flying within a year – 'unlimited support' was to be provided for these two programmes by the national research institutes. Yakovlev made two prototypes for flight testing, and one more for static and dynamic ground tests. The first prototype was flown on 3 July 1952. It was powered with two 1,268 kW (1,700 hp) Shvetsov ASh-82V radial engines and was built in a tandem rotor layout, which was not typical for Soviet helicopters, which soon brought it the nickname Letayushchiy Vagon (Russian: Летающий вагон) – 'the Flying Railroad Car'. The engines and transmission system were identical to the already-proven single-engine Mil Mi-4, but the Yak-24 proved to be less successful. Its engines were linked together so each could drive one or both rotors, but such an arrangement caused strong vibrations in the airframe. After the problems were partially solved, the new helicopter was ordered for production by the Soviet Air Force, which began in 1955 at Factory No. 272 in Leningrad.

In July 1955, the Yak-24 was first presented to the public in Tushino, and on 17 December 1955 it set two new world payload records, lifting a 2,000 kg (4,409 lb) load to 5,082 m (16,673 ft) and 4,000 kg (8,818 lb) to 2,902 m (9,521 ft).

The only produced variant was the Yak-24 – Army transport helicopter, that could carry up to 19 airborne troops, 12 stretchers or 2,000 kg (4,409 lb) of cargo, including field guns or GAZ-69 army car. In the nose was a 12.7 mm A-12,7 machine gun mounting, manned by radio operator. Yak-24 was also used as a flying crane, lifting an external load of 4,000 kg (8,818 lb). In 1957, the improved model Yak-24U was developed, rebuilt from serial helicopter, with all-metal rotors of larger diameter (21 m/69 ft) and an all-metal wider fuselage. It could carry 40 soldiers or 3,500 kg (7,716 lb) of cargo, including ASU-57 tank destroyer. It completed test program in 1958, but did not enter production. A civilian variant for Aeroflot for 30 passengers was the Yak-24A of 1960, but it was not produced either. There were two proposed models: the Yak-24K nine-seat VIP salon with a shorter fuselage and the civilian Yak-24P for 39 passengers with more powerful 2,013 kW (2,700 hp) turboshaft engines, but neither reached production. The helicopter was little known, so specifications and technical details varied among different sources, and also older publications claimed, that Yak-24U and passenger Yak-24A were produced.

Data on the Yak-24 are inconsistent and sometimes contradictory, the exact number of helicopters produced is unknown, with estimates ranging from 40 to 100 units depending on the source of the data. According to newer Russian sources, only 35 series helicopters were built in 1956–1958 in Leningrad, in addition to two prototypes and three pre-series helicopters (1953-1958). All sources agree that production of the Yak-24 was curtailed due to technical problems, and the need for a heavy transport helicopter was fulfilled by the successful Mil Mi-6. According to some sources, the passenger Yak-24A for Aeroflot was not actually produced. The exact date of the Yak-24's decommissioning from the Soviet Air Force, and possibly Aeroflot, is unknown. A surviving Yak-24 is preserved at the Central Air Force Museum in Monino, Russia.

== Operators ==
Soviet Union

- Soviet Air Force

== Specifications (Yak-24U) ==
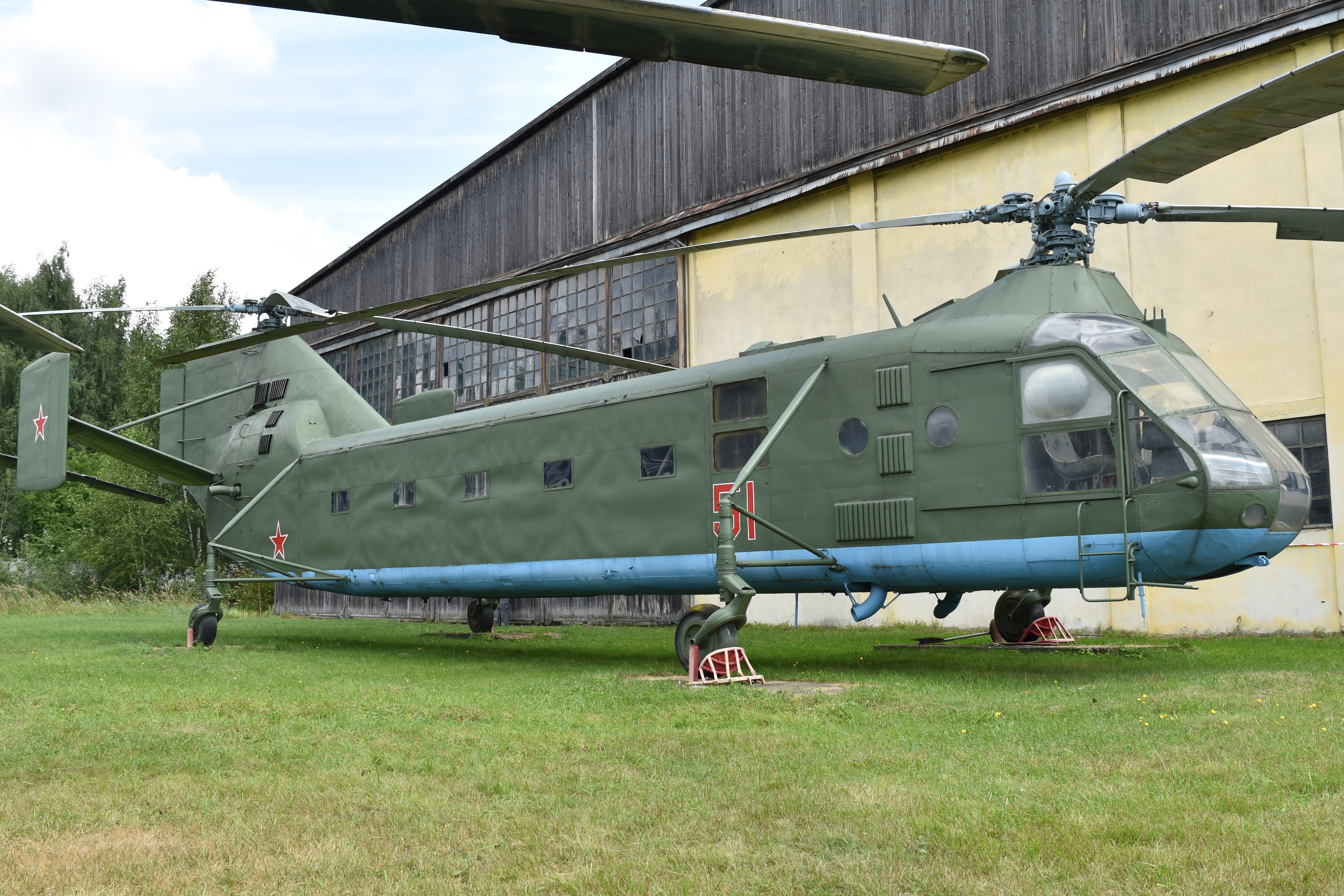
Yak-24U at the Central Air Force Museum

Data from Soviet Transport Aircraft since 1945

General characteristics

- Crew: three (two pilots, radio operator)
- Capacity: 19 soldiers, 12 stretchers, or 2,000 kg (4,409 lb) of cargo
- Length: 22.40 m (73 ft 6 in) (fuselage length); Overall length (including rotors): 34.03 m (111 ft 8 in)
- Height: 6.50 m (21 ft 4 in)
- Empty weight: 11,000 kg (24,251 lb)
- Max takeoff weight: 15,830 kg (34,899 lb)
- Powerplant: 2 × Shvetsov ASh-82V 14-cylinder radial engines, 1,300 kW (1,700 hp) each
- Main rotor diameter: 2 × 20.00 m (65 ft 7 in)
- Main rotor area: 693 m^{2} (7,460 sq ft)

Performance

- Maximum speed: 175 km/h (109 mph, 94 kn)
- Range: 380 km (240 mi, 210 nmi)
- Service ceiling: 4,000 m (13,000 ft)
- Rate of climb: 3.15 m/s (620 ft/min)

== See also ==
Aircraft of comparable role, configuration, and era

- Piasecki H-16
- Boeing CH-47 Chinook
