= Hunt Rotary Aeroplane =

Early American helicopter

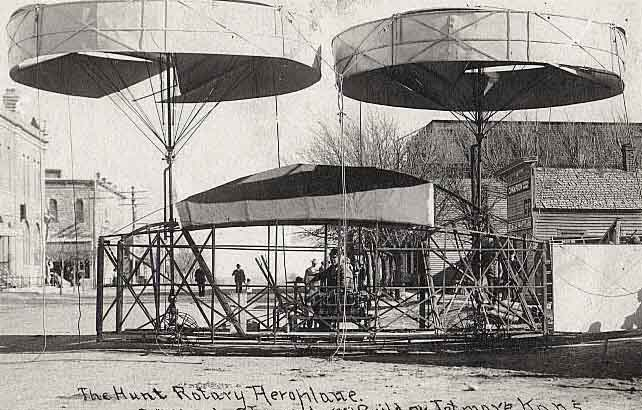
- The Hunt Rotary Aeroplane, photographed in 1910 at Jetmore, Kansas

General information
- Type: Helicopter
- National origin: United States
- Number built: 1

History
- Introduction date: 1910

The Hunt Rotary Aeroplane was an American tandem-rotor helicopter built in 1910. It did not fly.

In 1910 A. E. Hunt, a blacksmith, resident in Jetmore, Kansas, designed and built a helicopter, which was referred to as a Rotary Aeroplane. The craft was described as being of all-metal construction, made of pipe, tin sheets and angle iron. It's been variously estimated to weigh between 4,000 and 8,800 lbs (1,800 and 4,000 kg). It was equipped with a 40 hp (30 kW) six-cylinder engine. The fuselage consisted of an open framework, with a flat floor, vertical sides, and an arched canopy. It was equipped with a four-wheeled undercarriage.

Each rotor, arranged in tandem, consisted of a set of blades surrounded by a shallow shroud made of sheet tin. The axles of each rotor could be pivoted forward, to achieve forward movement. A pilot, located centrally within the fuselage, could alter the collective pitch of the blades in each rotor, and also control a vertical rudder that was attached to the rear of the fuselage.

The only known image of the Hunt Rotary Aeroplane appears to show it at the intersection of Roughton Street and West Highway Street in Jetmore, with the camera facing east.

Initial attempts to fly the Rotary Aeroplane proved unsuccessful. Later tests carried out by A. E. Hunt confirmed that the apparatus was able to lift 400 lb (180 kg), though that was insufficient to achieve flight. It was subsequently reported that the Rotary Aeroplane had been sold for scrap, and that Hunt had started work on a second flying machine, but that it was not completed.

== See also ==
Aircraft of comparable role, configuration, and era

- Breguet-Richet Gyroplane
- Cornu helicopter
- Ellehammer helicopter
- PKZ-2
