= Jetmore, Kansas =

City in Hodgeman County, Kansas

- City and County seat
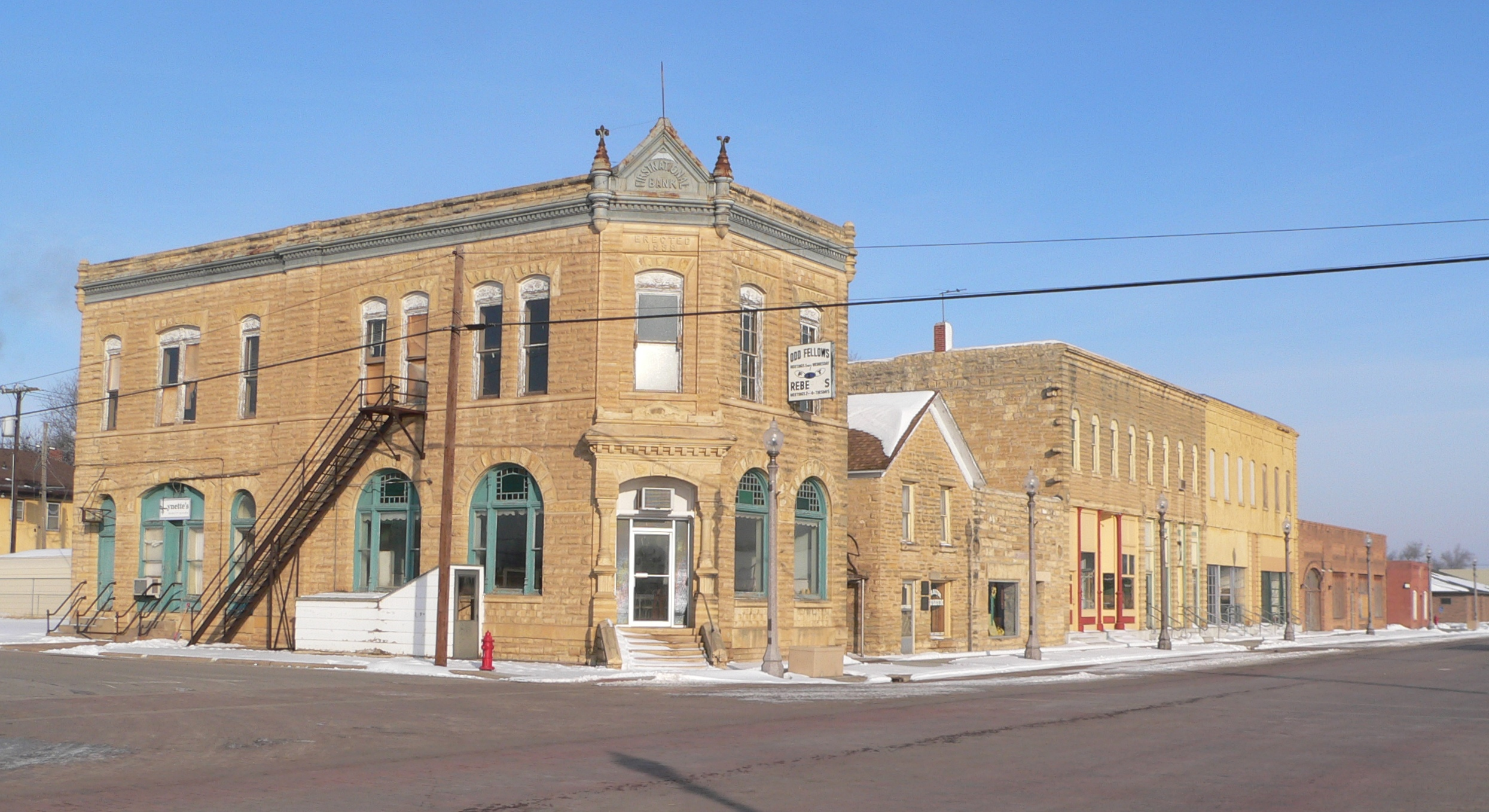
- West side of Main Street (2010)

- Location within Hodgeman County and Kansas

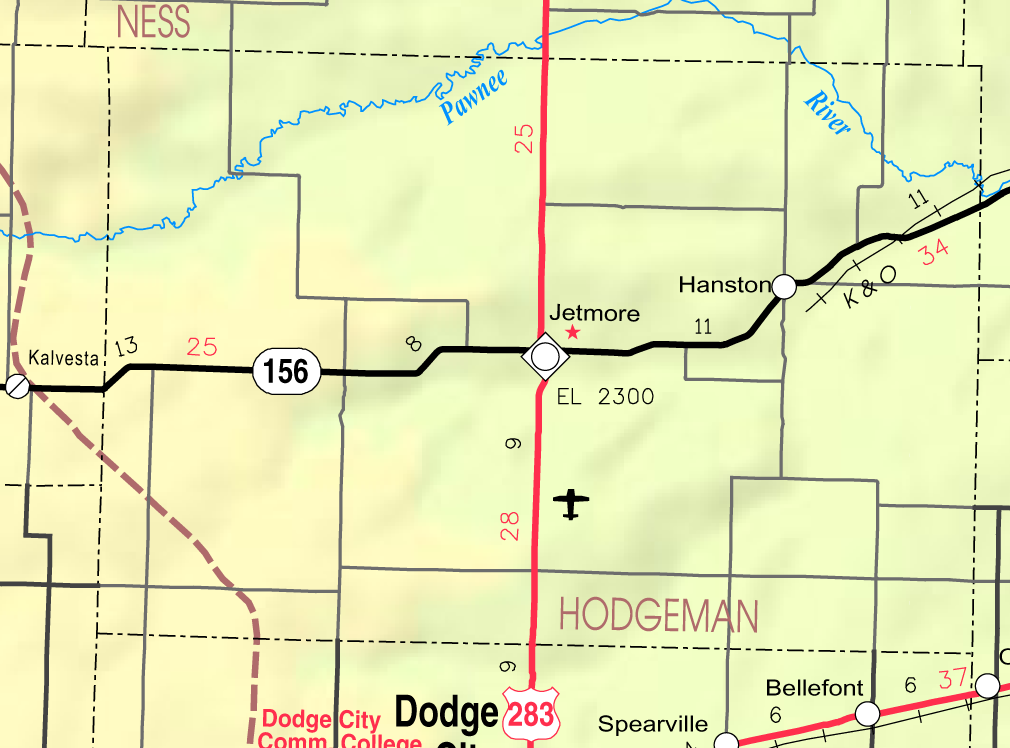
- KDOT map of Hodgeman County (legend)
- Coordinates: 38°03′08″N 99°57′39″W
- Country: United States
- State: Kansas
- County: Hodgeman
- Founded: 1870s
- Platted: 1879
- Incorporated: 1887
- Named for: Col. Abraham Jetmore

Area
  - Total: 4.21 sq mi (10.90 km^{2})
  - Land: 4.21 sq mi (10.90 km^{2})
  - Water: 0 sq mi (0.00 km^{2})
- Elevation: 2,461 ft (750 m)

Population (2020)
  - Total: 770
  - Density: 180/sq mi (71/km^{2})
- Time zone: UTC-6 (CST)
  - Summer (DST): UTC-5 (CDT)
- ZIP Code: 67854
- Area code: 620
- FIPS code: 20-35450
- GNIS ID: 2395469
- Website: jetmorekansas.com

Jetmore is a city in and the county seat of Hodgeman County, Kansas, United States. As of the 2020 census, the population of the city was 770.

== History ==
Jetmore was originally called Buckner, and was laid out under the latter name in 1879. The name was changed to Jetmore in 1880 in honor of Col. Abraham Buckles Jetmore. A lawyer from Topeka, Abraham Jetmore was instrumental in securing a railroad line through the city and in arranging for it to become the county seat.

== Geography ==
According to the United States Census Bureau, the city has a total area of 4.49 square miles (11.63 km^{2}), all land. The Buckner Creek, a tributary of the Pawnee River, flows through Jetmore.

The surface rocks in this area consist of Greenhorn Limestone and Graneros Shale.

=== Climate ===
The climate in this area is characterized by hot, humid summers and generally mild to cool winters. According to the Köppen Climate Classification system, Jetmore has a humid subtropical climate, abbreviated "Cfa" on climate maps.

Climate data for Jetmore, Kansas, 1991–2020 normals, extremes 1900–present
Month	Jan	Feb	Mar	Apr	May	Jun	Jul	Aug	Sep	Oct	Nov	Dec	Year
Record high °F (°C)	82 (28)	90 (32)	94 (34)	101 (38)	105 (41)	113 (45)	116 (47)	114 (46)	109 (43)	101 (38)	93 (34)	85 (29)	116 (47)
Mean maximum °F (°C)	68.4 (20.2)	74.8 (23.8)	82.8 (28.2)	89.3 (31.8)	95.6 (35.3)	101.4 (38.6)	104.8 (40.4)	102.9 (39.4)	98.7 (37.1)	92.9 (33.8)	78.5 (25.8)	66.7 (19.3)	105.7 (40.9)
Mean daily maximum °F (°C)	44.1 (6.7)	47.6 (8.7)	58.2 (14.6)	67.5 (19.7)	77.2 (25.1)	87.8 (31.0)	93.6 (34.2)	91.3 (32.9)	83.3 (28.5)	70.6 (21.4)	56.3 (13.5)	45.6 (7.6)	68.6 (20.3)
Daily mean °F (°C)	31.0 (−0.6)	34.0 (1.1)	43.5 (6.4)	52.5 (11.4)	63.2 (17.3)	74.0 (23.3)	79.6 (26.4)	77.5 (25.3)	69.0 (20.6)	55.7 (13.2)	42.4 (5.8)	32.8 (0.4)	54.6 (12.6)
Mean daily minimum °F (°C)	17.9 (−7.8)	20.4 (−6.4)	28.8 (−1.8)	37.6 (3.1)	49.1 (9.5)	60.1 (15.6)	65.5 (18.6)	63.7 (17.6)	54.6 (12.6)	40.9 (4.9)	28.5 (−1.9)	20.1 (−6.6)	40.6 (4.8)
Mean minimum °F (°C)	0.6 (−17.4)	3.7 (−15.7)	11.4 (−11.4)	22.6 (−5.2)	34.1 (1.2)	47.9 (8.8)	55.2 (12.9)	54.4 (12.4)	40.2 (4.6)	24.3 (−4.3)	11.8 (−11.2)	3.9 (−15.6)	−4.4 (−20.2)
Record low °F (°C)	−24 (−31)	−21 (−29)	−19 (−28)	8 (−13)	21 (−6)	35 (2)	42 (6)	36 (2)	27 (−3)	9 (−13)	−6 (−21)	−20 (−29)	−24 (−31)
Average precipitation inches (mm)	0.64 (16)	0.72 (18)	1.47 (37)	2.01 (51)	3.66 (93)	3.45 (88)	3.63 (92)	2.84 (72)	1.65 (42)	1.94 (49)	0.77 (20)	0.95 (24)	23.73 (602)
Average snowfall inches (cm)	6.1 (15)	4.7 (12)	3.3 (8.4)	1.2 (3.0)	0.0 (0.0)	0.0 (0.0)	0.0 (0.0)	0.0 (0.0)	0.0 (0.0)	0.2 (0.51)	1.6 (4.1)	4.1 (10)	21.2 (53.01)
Average precipitation days (≥ 0.01 in)	2.4	2.6	3.7	5.0	6.9	7.2	6.7	6.0	3.5	3.8	2.3	2.3	52.4
Average snowy days (≥ 0.1 in)	1.8	1.4	1.2	0.4	0.0	0.0	0.0	0.0	0.0	0.2	0.4	1.2	6.6
Source: NOAA

== Demographics ==
Historical population
Census	Pop.	Note	%±
1890	324		—
1900	230		−29.0%
1910	317		37.8%
1920	559		76.3%
1930	914		63.5%
1940	881		−3.6%
1950	988		12.1%
1960	1,028		4.0%
1970	936		−8.9%
1980	862		−7.9%
1990	850		−1.4%
2000	903		6.2%
2010	867		−4.0%
2020	770		−11.2%
U.S. Decennial Census

=== 2020 census ===
The 2020 United States census counted 770 people, 333 households, and 208 families in Jetmore. The population density was 182.9 per square mile (70.6/km^{2}). There were 378 housing units at an average density of 89.8 per square mile (34.7/km^{2}). The racial makeup was 89.87% (692) white or European American (88.31% non-Hispanic white), 1.56% (12) black or African-American, 0.52% (4) Native American or Alaska Native, 0.78% (6) Asian, 0.13% (1) Pacific Islander or Native Hawaiian, 1.56% (12) from other races, and 5.58% (43) from two or more races. Hispanic or Latino of any race was 5.84% (45) of the population.

Of the 333 households, 30.6% had children under the age of 18; 52.3% were married couples living together; 23.4% had a female householder with no spouse or partner present. 33.6% of households consisted of individuals and 18.3% had someone living alone who was 65 years of age or older. The average household size was 2.1 and the average family size was 2.8. The percent of those with a bachelor's degree or higher was estimated to be 20.6% of the population.

25.5% of the population was under the age of 18, 3.9% from 18 to 24, 21.7% from 25 to 44, 25.8% from 45 to 64, and 23.1% who were 65 years of age or older. The median age was 44.1 years. For every 100 females, there were 103.2 males. For every 100 females ages 18 and older, there were 101.4 males.

The 2016–2020 5-year American Community Survey estimates show that the median household income was $55,000 (with a margin of error of +/- $11,841) and the median family income was $74,107 (+/- $19,811). Males had a median income of $39,028 (+/- $8,639) versus $30,144 (+/- $12,330) for females. The median income for those above 16 years old was $32,500 (+/- $7,047). Approximately, 7.2% of families and 9.8% of the population were below the poverty line, including 13.7% of those under the age of 18 and 7.4% of those ages 65 or over.

=== 2010 census ===
As of the census of 2010, there were 867 people, 366 households, and 232 families residing in the city. The population density was 193.1 inhabitants per square mile (74.6/km^{2}). There were 439 housing units at an average density of 97.8 per square mile (37.8/km^{2}). The racial makeup of the city was 96.3% White, 0.1% African American, 0.1% Native American, 0.5% Asian, 1.7% from other races, and 1.3% from two or more races. Hispanic or Latino of any race were 4.6% of the population.

There were 366 households, of which 32.2% had children under the age of 18 living with them, 50.8% were married couples living together, 6.6% had a female householder with no husband present, 6.0% had a male householder with no wife present, and 36.6% were non-families. 33.6% of all households were made up of individuals, and 22.2% had someone living alone who was 65 years of age or older. The average household size was 2.33 and the average family size was 2.97.

The median age in the city was 42.1 years. 26.2% of residents were under the age of 18; 5.4% were between the ages of 18 and 24; 21.9% were from 25 to 44; 24.8% were from 45 to 64; and 21.8% were 65 years of age or older. The gender makeup of the city was 47.4% male and 52.6% female.

== Education ==
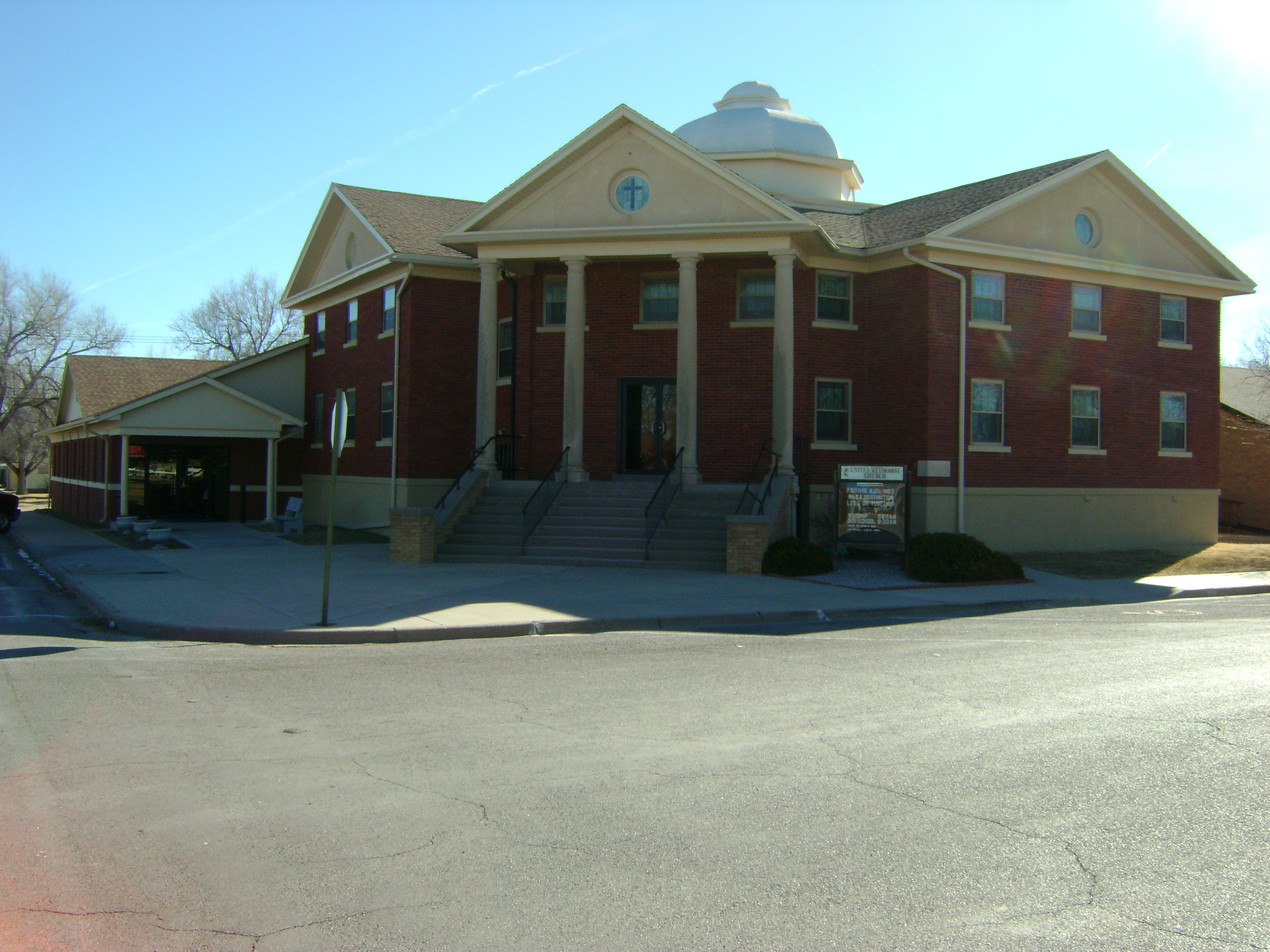
United Methodist Church in Jetmore (2010)

The community is served by Hodgeman County USD 227 public school district. The district has two schools:

- Hodgeman County Middle/High School
- Hodgeman County Elementary School

== Transportation ==
=== Airports ===
- Jetmore Municipal Airport (No commercial flights)
- Dodge City Regional Airport (Nearest commercial airport 26 miles (42 km) away)

=== Highways ===
- US-283
- K-156

== See also ==
- Tornadoes of 1972
- Hunt Rotary Aeroplane, an early helicopter built and tested at Jetmore
- T. S. Haun House
