= Filper Research Beta =

Filper Research Beta 200A
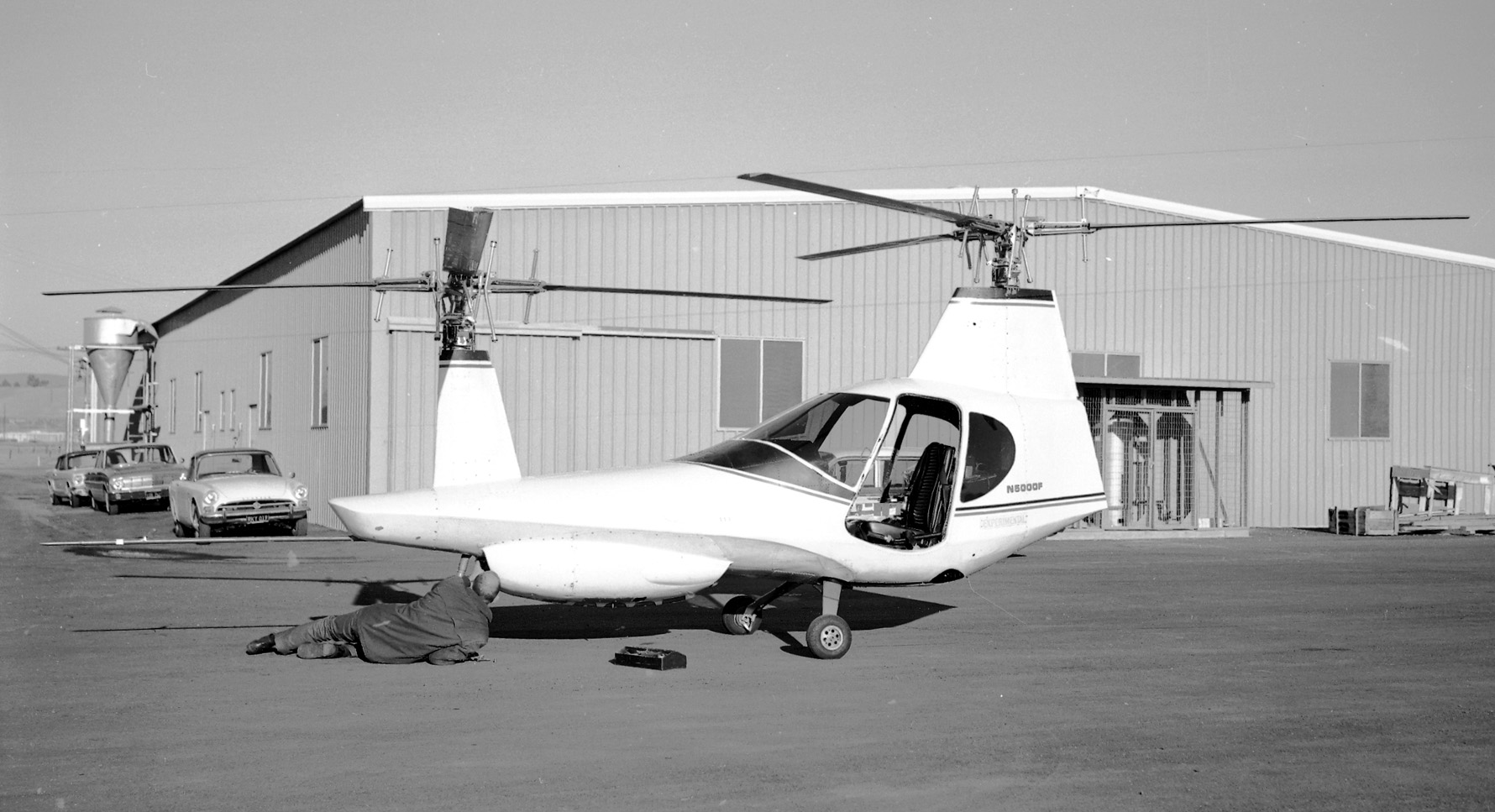

General information
- Type: Light helicopter
- Manufacturer: Filper Research Division; Filper Corporation

History
- First flight: May 26, 1966

The Filper Research Models Beta 200 and Beta 400 were small tandem, rigid rotor, helicopters intended for the personal helicopter market. Filper Research, located in San Ramon, California, was in existence from 1965 to 1968. The Beta 200 was a two place helicopter and the Beta 400 was a four place helicopter. One Beta 200 prototype and one Beta 400 prototype were manufactured and flown. Several pre-production airframes, which never flew, were also manufactured. Development testing was done in the experimental category. Development was not completed and Filper did not apply for an FAA Type Certificate for either type. There were several other variations on the basic Beta design which were contemplated but these were never developed beyond the conceptual stage. There was a fatal crash of the Beta 400 prototype in November 1967 and the company ceased operations in April 1968.

Filper Research was formed as a division of Filper corporation as the result of its acquisition of Copperfield Corporation, a small helicopter technology company, in 1965 Filper Corporation was an agricultural grower and food processing company located in the California central valley with offices in San Ramon, California. Their agricultural products were marketed under the name "F&P"; Filper also manufactured food processing equipment such as peach pitters.

== Corporate history ==
=== Copperfield Corporation ===
Copperfield Corporation, was formed In 1958. The principles were William Orr, Bub Orr, JFord Johnston, Ervin Culver. J Eric Rhodes and Jimmie Johnson. All of the principles were recent or current employees of Lockheed Corporation. William Orr, Bub Orr and Jimmie Johnson were from Lockheed Missiles and Space in Sunnyvale, California. JFord Johnston. J Eric Rhodes and Ervin Culver were from Lockheed Aircraft in Burbank, California. Johnston and Culver were involved in the Lockheed rigid rotor program from its inception.

In the same time frame that Lockheed was developing its rigid rotor technology, Copperfield independently developed a proof of concept test bed of a small tandem rigid rotor helicopter (N9712C). The test bed had tubular frame with tandem rotors connected by a drive shaft with the engine below. The single pilot sat astride the tubular structure. The test bed was flown (hover only) by Lockheed test pilot Herman 'Fish" Salmon. Copperfield called their rigid rotor design "Gyroflex". The dynamic design was created by Jford Johnston and Ervin Culver, who were Lockheed employees at the time. Copperfield obtained an agreement with Lockheed which allowed it to develop their system without potential issues regarding possible use of Lockheed technology. The exact details of the agreement are unknown but they were sufficient to allow Copperfield to seek venture capital to develop a helicopter using the Gyroflex technology.

In 1965, Copperfield principle and marketing executive William Orr contacted Filper Corporation as a possible source to capital for further development. Based upon the success of the test bed, Filper acquired development and marketing rights to the "Gyroflex" design and the services of some Copperfield personnel. It is not known whether Copperfield was acquired by Filper or just their technology .Filper then established Filper Research. From that point onward all funding for Filper Research was provided by Filper Corporation. Filper Corporation was absorbed in a buy-out by DiGiorgio Corporation in 1976.

=== Filper research ===
Filper Research started operations in June 1965. It was located in an office building near the Filper Facility in San Ramon, California. The onsite personnel that first day were General Manager William F. Orr, Chief Engineer JFord Johnston, Chief Project Engineer J Eric Rhodes, Industrial Designer Jimmie Johnson and John Turner, a mechanical engineer who had graduated the previous Friday from CSULA. This was Mr. Turner's first association with Copperfield.

Bub Orr was not involved at any time during the course of the program; Ervin Culver was only peripherally involved. William Orr was the daily interface with Filper and the aviation media.

Shortly thereafter the following persons were added.

- Andrew Androlia- Director of Manufacturing -Hiller
- Bruce Jones - Test Pilot - Hiller
- Bob Kelly - Airframe designer -Lockheed
- William Wada - Drive System Design - Hiller -Arrow Gear
- Jack Baumann- Principle Airframe Designer
- Paul McKim - Ground Test Engineer - Hiller
- The manufacturing personnel, under the direction of Andy Androlia, were almost exclusively former employees of Hiller Helicopters in Palo Alto. After their unsuccessful bid for the Army contract for the Light Observation Helicopter (LOH) Hiller was bought by Fairchild and moved operations to Maryland. This was fortuitous event since it provided Filper Research with a highly qualified manufacturing team. The LOH competition was won by Hughes Tool Company Aircraft Division with their OH-6A Cayuse. The Hiller LOH competitor(YOH-5) became the FH1000 5 place commercial helicopter. The Bell Helicopter competitor(YOH5) became the highly successful Jet Ranger.

=== Rigid Rotor Technology ===
==== Historical background ====
A helicopter rigid rotor system does not have either flapping or lead-lag hinges between the rotor shaft and the rotor blades. A rigid rotor makes the helicopter very maneuverable, capable of high speed with an extraordinarily wide center of gravity range. Prior to 1960, attempts to develop rigid rotor technology by various helicopter manufactures had failed. As a result, rotor systems on then existing machines used either teetering (Bell, Hiller, et al) or articulated rotors (Sikorsky, Piasecki et al). During the early to mid 1960's Lockheed Corporation conducted Research and Development on a series of small helicopters using a revolutionary rigid rotor concept The Lockheed design was based upon the work of legendary Lockheed dynamicist Ervin Culver with assistance from JFord Johnston. Lockheed produced several prototypes, which are described below.

==== Lockheed Rigid Rotor helicopters ====
The first Lockheed rigid rotor prototype was the CL-475 (note, the CL model designation stands for Clarence l "Kelly" Johnson from the Skunk Works). The two place CL-475 successfully implemented Lockheed's rigid rotor concept in a conventional single main rotor and tail rotor format. Lockheed then designed a much more aerodynamic rigid rotor prototype, the Model 286, which demonstrated amazing stability and flight characteristics. Finally a prototype compound helicopter was produced by adding a Pratt and Whitney PT-6 turbo jet engine to the Model 286. This was designated the XH-51. The XH-51 was flown to 302 mph. The XH-51 success was a prime factor in Lockheed being selected for the army AAFCS / Cheyanne program.

=== Beta Design concept ===
As mentioned above, Copperfield had developed a proof-of-concept test bed (N9712C). Using that basic system arrangement, Jimmie Johnson created a design for the Beta 200, a two seat personal helicopter.

The design featured an aerodynamic fuselage, forward and aft pylon mounted rotors and a passenger compartment located at the rear. The engine was mounted below and forward of the passenger compartment. The rotors were interconnected with a drive shaft which was driven by the engine through a clutch and transfer gear box. The rotors were controlled by force only, reacting as a gyroscope.

The Beta 200A had many innovative design features, such as a fixed wing style control wheel instead of the typical helicopter flight controls. However, some of these presented major development challenges. These included:

- A very complex and heavy drive system consisting of two rotor systems, two rotor drive gear boxes, a long rotor interconnecting shaft, transfer case and centrifugal drive clutch.
- Complex mechanical flight controls. The rotors were controlled, not by pitch displacement as in normal helicopters, but by applying forces on the rotors which then responded as large gyroscopes.
- The selection of main rotor blades with zero twist.
- A relatively large overlap between the front and rear rotors

These design choices ultimately precluded the very aggressive flight performance and procurement costs presented in marketing materials.

=== Design implementation ===
Design of the pre-production Beta 200A helicopter began in June 1965.

Chief Project Engineer J Eric Rhodes and designer / draftsman John Turner designed the basic Beta 200 airframe structure, assisted by Bob Kelly and later in 1965 by Jack Baumann, who had previously designed the Baumann Custer CCW-5. Dynamic analysis was done by Chief engineer JFord Johnston.

Drive system design was done by Bill Wada. The gear boxes were fabricated by Arrow Gear of Downers Grove Illinois.

The Continental IO-360E engine was selected. It was connected to the transfer gearbox by a cooling fan and centrifugal clutch. The cowling very tightly conformed to the engine

Design of pre-production Beta 200A vehicle design was completed in May 1966

=== Fabrication ===
Fabrication pre-production airframes began in late 1965.The fabrication was conducted in an addition to the Filper plant in San Ramon.

Airframe fabrication included the creation of a "plaster master", fabrication and assembly of contoured skins and bulkheads, frames, stringers and flight controls. Dynamic components and electrical wiring were also installed.

Approximately six pre-production airframes were ultimately built. Only two, a Beta 200A and a Beta 400A were ever flight worthy.

The first flyable flight test article, a Beta 200A, which was the flight test article, was assigned FAA tail number N5000F.

Later in the program a second pre-production airframe / flight test article was built. It was the Beta basic 200A which had been extended 36 inches. The Continental IO-520 was installed. It was designated Beta 400A, because it could be four place. It was assigned FAA tail number N5005F,

The remaining articles under construction were Beta 200A airframes .None were close to being flight worthy at the end of the program. No FAA tail numbers were assigned to these incomplete airframes

=== Ground test ===
In late 1965 the dynamic components, gear boxes, rotor blades etc. became available. During this period laboratory testing of the dynamic components were conducted. Also In parallel with production fabrication, a steel tube test rig was built and was used to evaluate the integrated performance of the drive system, rotor systems and control systems. The design of this test bed was done by John Turner. These ground tests showed no significant design issues. This test bed was flown one time in hover only by test pilot Bruce Jones. Endurance testing of dynamic components continued during the initial flight test phase.

=== Flight Test ===
==== Beta 200A ====
The Beta 200A (N5000F) first flew on May 26, 1966. Flight testing of N5000F continued through July 1967. The flight test manager was Zeke Hopkins, who had previously been with North American on the XB-70 and A-EJ. The flight test engineer was John Turner. The pilot for the initial flight testing was Bruce Jones. Mr Jones left Filper Research in early 1967.

The results of the initial flight tests were very disappointing. The Beta 200A exhibited the following undesirable characteristics:

- Significantly under powered.
- A tendency to pitch nose down during transition to forward flight.
- The "Gyroflex" rotor could not be controlled by force only.

Attempts to enter into forward flight were unsuccessful; the N5000F was tested in hover only.

==== Beta 400A ====
As a result of the poor performance of the Beta 200A, the decision was made to replace the IO-360 (210 horsepower) engine with the Continental IO-520 (250 horsepower). At the same time it was decided that the extra horsepower would allow the helicopter to be increased to four place. This was the genesis of the Beta 400A. The one of a kind Beta 400A (N5005F) flew on July 13, 1967. Since the Filper Research facility at San Ramon had only a helipad, flight testing was done at the Livermore, California airport. Ex Air Force pilot, Tony Vincenzi, became the Filper test pilot replacing Bruce Jones.

Flight testing immediately showed that most of the undesirable characteristics of the Beta 200A remained. Aside from the engine change the only other change which affected flight performance was the additional of three feet to the fuselage. This reduced the rotor overlap.

Flight testing of N5005F was initiated in July 1967. N5005F was able to enter forward flight. Envelope expansion continued until November 1967. The test pilot was Tony Vincenzi.

==== Fatal accident ====
An envelope expansion flight on N5005F was scheduled for November 27, 1967. The flight plan called for flight to 110 kn, a speed which had not been attempted previously. As the pilot was attempting to reach the 110 kn test point at an altitude of approximately 1500 ft AGL the rotor system went unstable and destroyed the vehicle in flight. The pilot was unable to parachute clear and was killed. Since the aircraft was operating in the experimental category, an accident investigation was not conducted by the NTSB.

== Conclusion ==
Filper Research ceased operation in April 1968. No further flight operations were conducted after November 27, 1967. Fabrication of airframes ceased. The disposition of the N5000F and incomplete airframes is unknown.Several of the principles returned to Lockheed.

== Variants ==
Copperfield Helicopter (N9712C)
Single proof of concept test bed with a 200 hp Continental IO-360E engine,
Fliper test rig
Single seat open tubular frame "proof-of-concept" test rig, one built and test flown.
Filper Beta 200A (N5000F)
Two-seat prototype with a 210 hp Continental IO-360E engine, one built and test flown and intended as a pattern design for commercial production.
Filper Beta 300
Proposed six-seat version powered by a 317 shp Allison 250-C18 turbine engine; Design concept only.
Filper Beta 400A (N5005F)
Four-seat prototype with a 250 hp Continental IO-520 engine, one built and test flown and intended as a pattern design for commercial production.

== Specifications (Filper Beta 200A) ==
Data from

General characteristics

- Crew: two
- Capacity: two (three-blade rotor)
- Length: 17 ft 6 in (5.33 m)
- Height: 9 ft 2 in (2.8 m)
- Empty weight: 1,000 lb (453 kg)
- Gross weight: 1,700 lb (771 kg)
- Powerplant: 1 × 210 hp Continental IO-360E piston engine , 200 hp (147.1 kW)
- Main rotor diameter: 2 × 20 ft 5 in (6.22 m)

Performance

- Maximum speed: 150 mph (241 km/h, 130 kn)
- Range: 400 mi (642 km, 350 nmi)
