= T. S. Haun House =

- U.S. National Register of Historic Places
- Location within Kansas
- Location: Main St., Jetmore, Kansas
- Coordinates: 38°05′00″N 99°53′47″W
- Area: less than one acre
- Built: 1879
- Website: Haun Museum
- NRHP reference No.: 73000759
- Added to NRHP: January 18, 1973

The T. S. Haun House, on Main St. in Jetmore, Kansas, was built in 1879. It was listed on the National Register of Historic Places in 1973.

It is now part of the Haun Museum.
