= Bell HSL =

American 1950s antisubmarine helicopter

HSL (Bell Model 61)
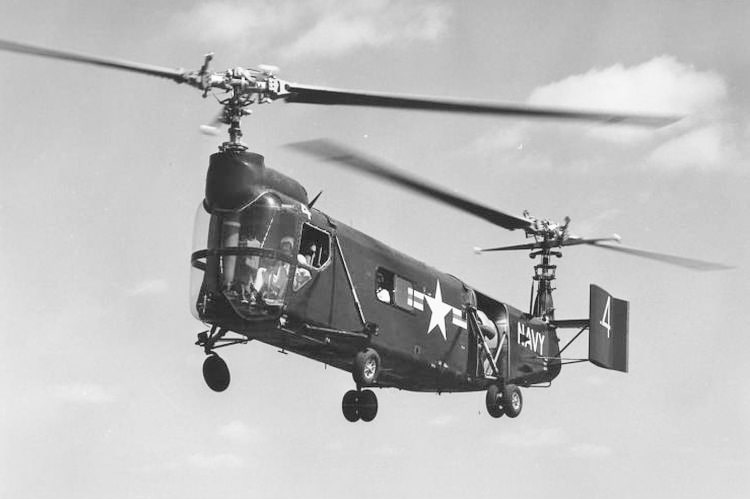
- The U.S. Navy Bell XHSL-1 prototype in flight.

General information
- Type: Tandem-rotor ASW helicopter
- National origin: United States
- Manufacturer: Bell Helicopter
- Status: Retired
- Primary user: United States Navy
- Number built: 53 including one static test article

History
- Introduction date: 1957
- First flight: 3 March 1953
- Retired: 1960

The Bell HSL (Model 61) was an American 1950s anti-submarine warfare (ASW) helicopter built by Bell Helicopter for the US Navy. The prototype first flew in 1953, but the type became obsolete during development and was found unsatisfactory upon entering service in 1957, resulting in the cancellation of the production contract; many of the 50 production aircraft were delivered directly into storage. The last HSL was retired in 1960. It was the only tandem rotor type designed by Bell.

== Design and development ==
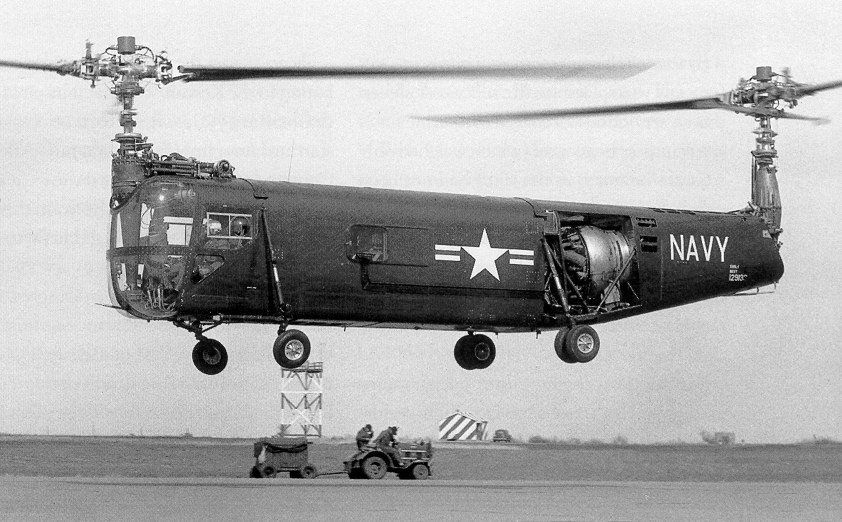
XHSL-1 prototype on a test flight

The prototype Bell Model 61 first flew on 3 March 1953; it had been designed to meet a United States Navy requirement for an anti-submarine warfare helicopter. In June 1950, the Model 61 was announced as the winner of the competition, and three XHSL-1 evaluation aircraft were ordered. The Model 61 had a rectangular-section fuselage structure and four-leg, six-wheel landing gear. It was powered by a Pratt & Whitney R-2800 radial engine mounted in the aft fuselage. Crew included two pilots and two sonar operators. The main rotors were at either end of the fuselage tube, linked by a transmission. The front rotor shaft was slightly ahead of pilots in the front cockpit.

Because of the urgency of the requirement, low-rate production was ordered almost immediately after Bell received a contract for three XHSL-1s. The Navy eventually contracted for at least 160 production aircraft, including 18 intended for the British Royal Navy. Bureau Numbers were assigned for a total of 234. Because of development problems that resulted in poor schedule performance to the contract, only 50 were built. Although all were delivered, after service test and acceptance only a handful were used, for the development of airborne mine sweeping. The rest were delivered directly into storage and were subsequently struck off.

== Operational history ==
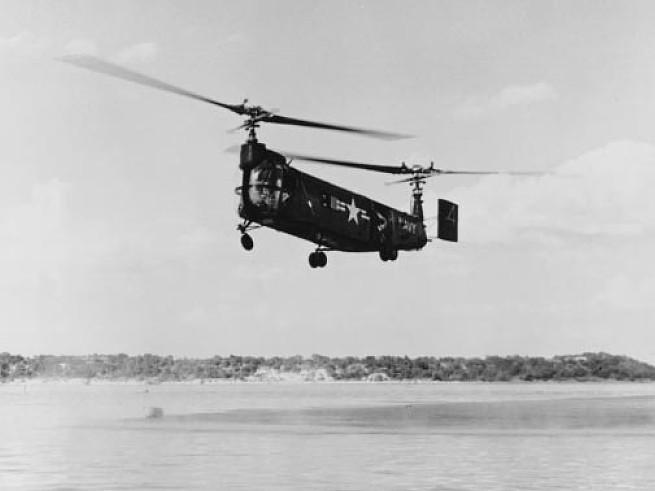
HSL-1 in a hover over water

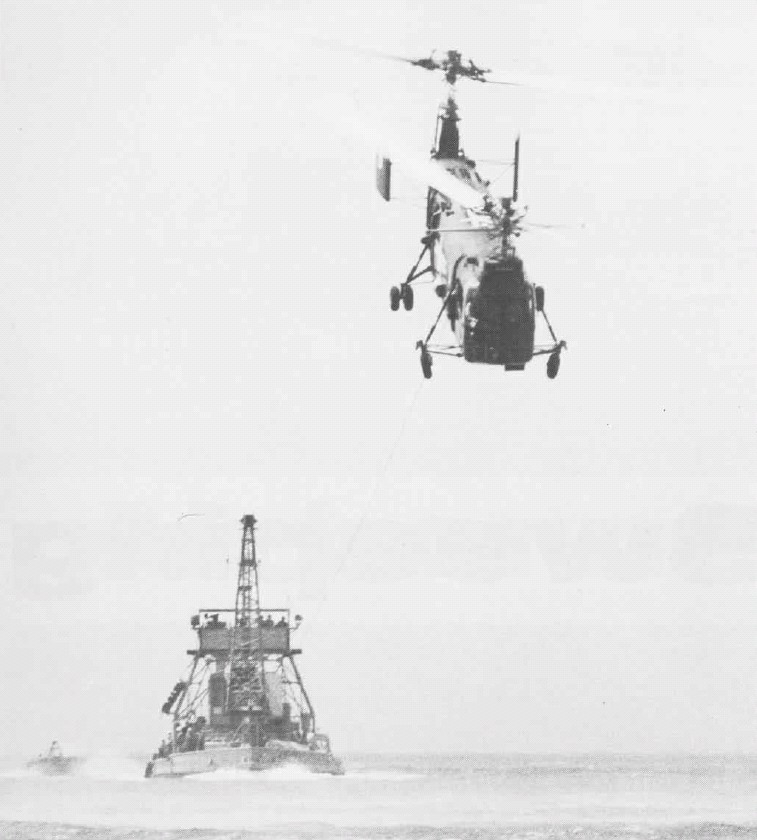
HSL-1 towing test

The HSLs were not used operationally. Approximately seven were assigned to the U.S. Naval Air Mine Defense Unit at Panama City, Florida, for the development of airborne mine-sweeping, the first arriving in September 1956 and the last being struck off in early 1960.

== Variants ==
XHSL-1
two experimental flight test and one static test article
HSL-1
production version, 50 built.
Bell Model 61
Company designation for the HSL
Bell D-116
A proposed civil variant of the Model 61, not proceeded with.
Bell D-216
A proposed variant of the HSL, not proceeded with.
Bell D-238
A proposed variant of the HSL, not proceeded with.

== Operators ==
United States

- United States Navy

== Specifications (HSL-1) ==
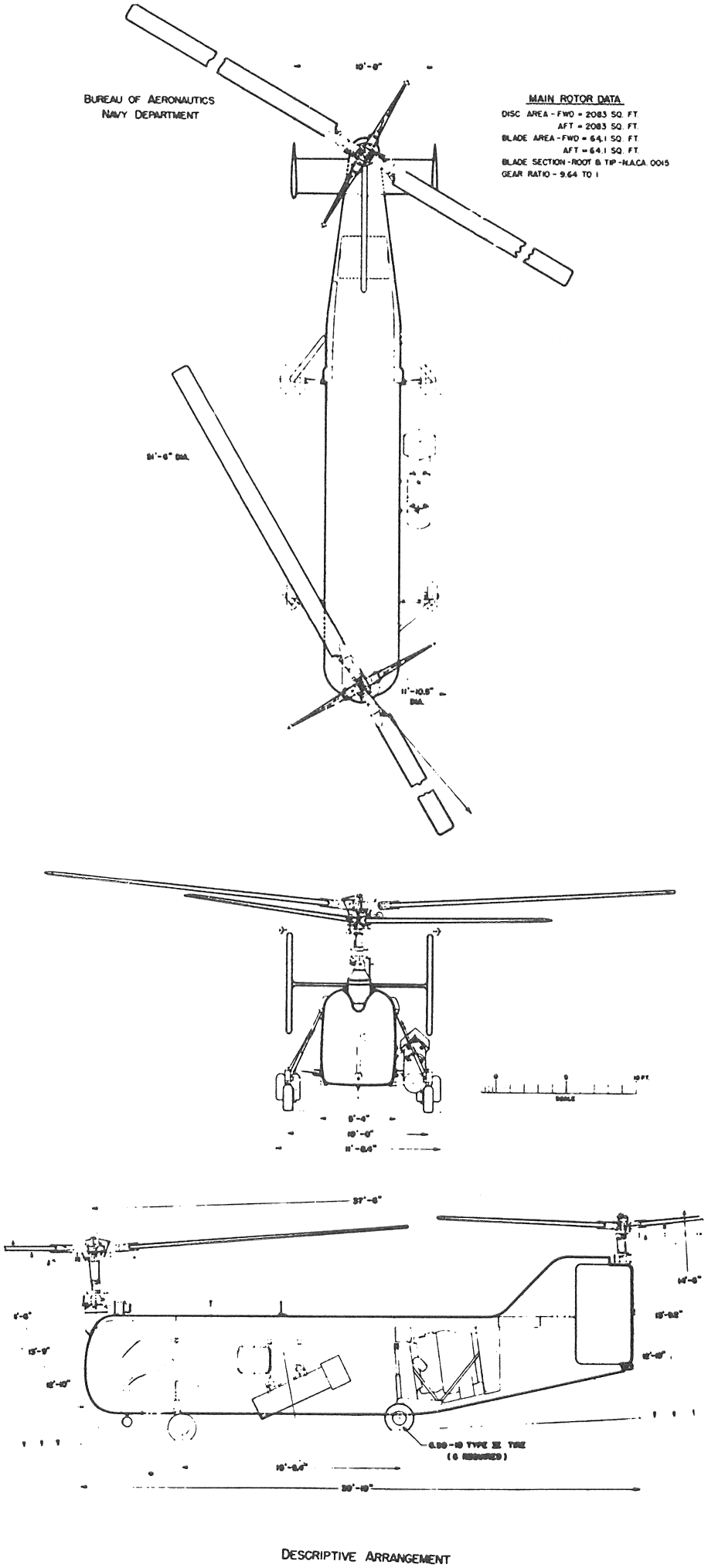
3-view line drawing of the Bell HSL-1

Data from NAVAER-1519B - Bell HSL-1 :Characteristic Summary Bell Aircraft since 1935

General characteristics

- Crew: 4 (search mission), 3 (attack mission)
- Capacity: Hoist capacity 800 lb (363 kg)
- Length: 39 ft 11 in (12.17 m) (fuselage only)
- Width: 11 ft 6 in (3.5 m) (rotors folded)
- Height: 14 ft 6 in (4.42 m)
- Empty weight: 13,073 lb (5,930 kg)
- Gross weight: 16,958 lb (7,692 kg) (search mission)

16,853 lb (7,644 kg) (attack mission)

- Max takeoff weight: 26,500 lb (12,020 kg)
- Fuel capacity: 450 US gal (375 imp gal; 1,703 L) maximum
- Powerplant: 1 × Pratt & Whitney R-2800-50 18-cyl. two-row air-cooled radial piston engine, 2,100 hp (1,600 kW) for sea level take-off at 2,600 rpm

normal power at sea level, 1,900 hp (1,417 kW) at 2,400 rpm

- Main rotor diameter: 2 × 51 ft 6 in (15.70 m)
- Main rotor area: 3,840 sq ft (357 m^{2})
- Blade section: NACA 0015

Performance

- Maximum speed: 124 mph (200 km/h, 108 kn) (search mission)
- Cruise speed: 96 mph (154 km/h, 83 kn) at 1,500 ft (457 m)
- Range: 350 mi (560 km, 300 nmi)
- Combat range: 140 mi (230 km, 120 nmi)
- Endurance: 3 hours 30 minutes loiter on search mission
- Service ceiling: 14,400 ft (4,400 m) at take-off weight with normal power
- Absolute hover ceiling OGE: 10,750 ft (3,277 m)
- Rate of climb: 1,475 ft/min (7.49 m/s) normal power, sea level, at take-off weight in forward flight

1,200 ft/min (6.1 m/s) in vertical flight with take-off power, sea level, at take-off weight in forward flight

Armament

- Bombs: 2x Mark 43 torpedoes

Avionics

- Dipping Sonar

== See also ==
Aircraft of comparable role, configuration, and era

- Piasecki HUP Retriever
