= Piasecki HUP Retriever =

American military helicopter (1949–1965)

H-25/HUP Retriever
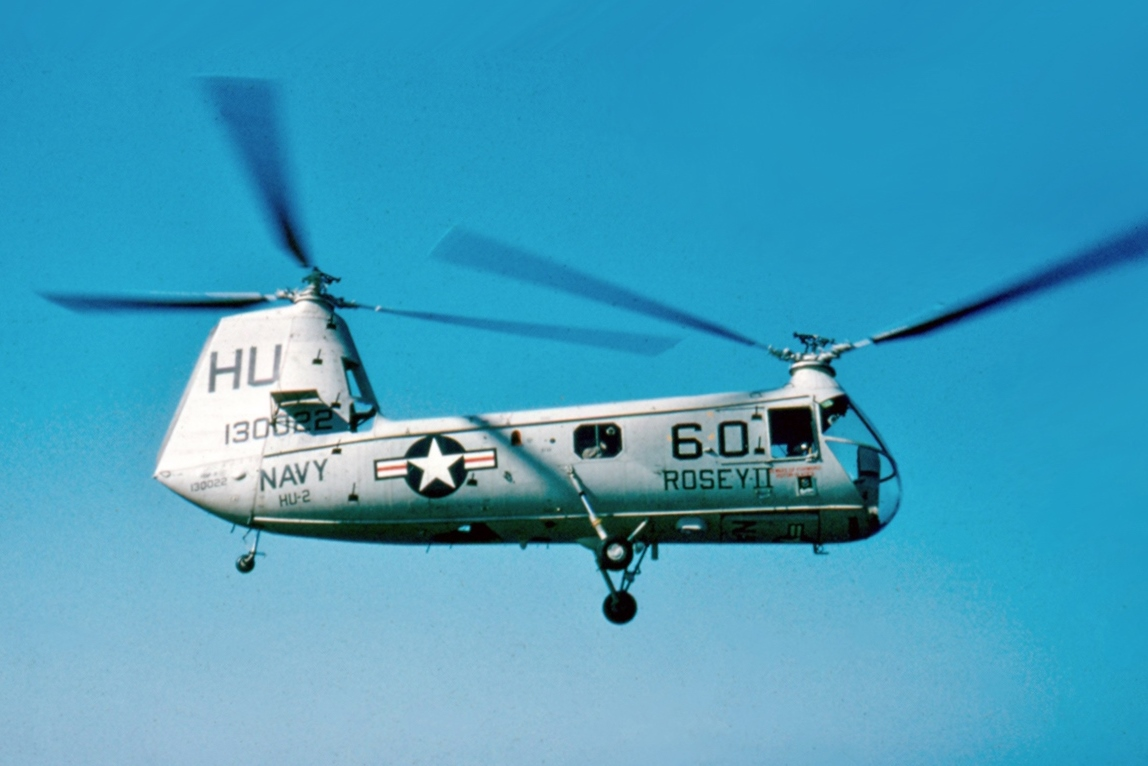
- A U.S. Navy HUP-2 from USS Franklin D. Roosevelt

General information
- Type: Utility helicopter
- Manufacturer: Piasecki Helicopter
- Primary users: United States Navy United States Army; Royal Canadian Navy; French Navy
- Number built: 339

History
- Manufactured: 1949–1954
- Introduction date: February 1949
- First flight: March 1948
- Retired: 1958 US Army; January 1964 RCN; 1964 USN; 1965 French Navy

The Piasecki HUP Retriever or H-25 Army Mule, later UH-25, is a compact single radial engine, twin overlapping tandem rotor utility helicopter developed by the Piasecki Helicopter Corporation of Morton, Pennsylvania. Designed to a United States Navy specification, the helicopter was produced from 1949 to 1954, and was also used by the United States Army and foreign navies. The HUP/H-25 was the first helicopter to be produced with an autopilot and also the first to perform a loop.

== Design and development ==
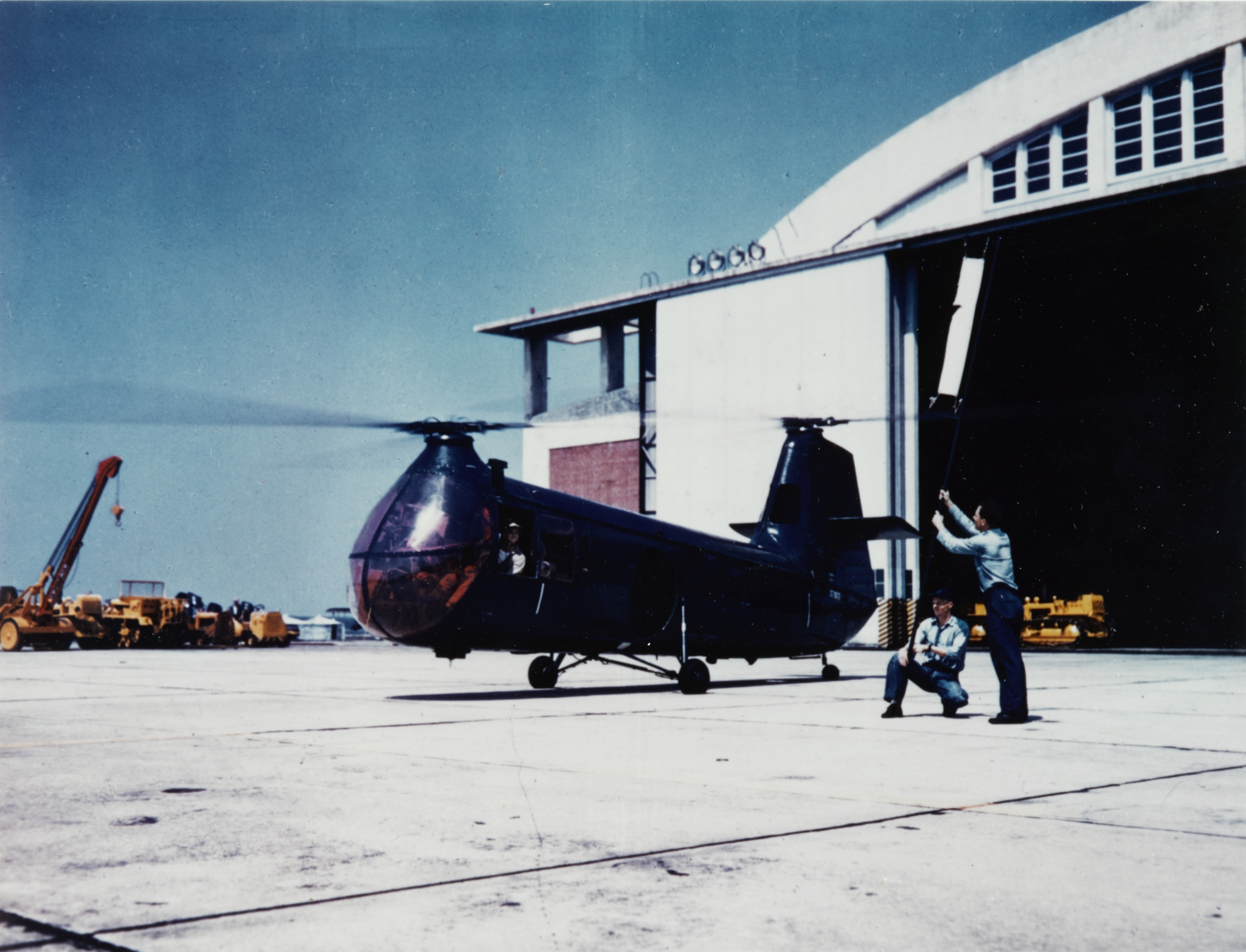
Piasecki XHJP-1

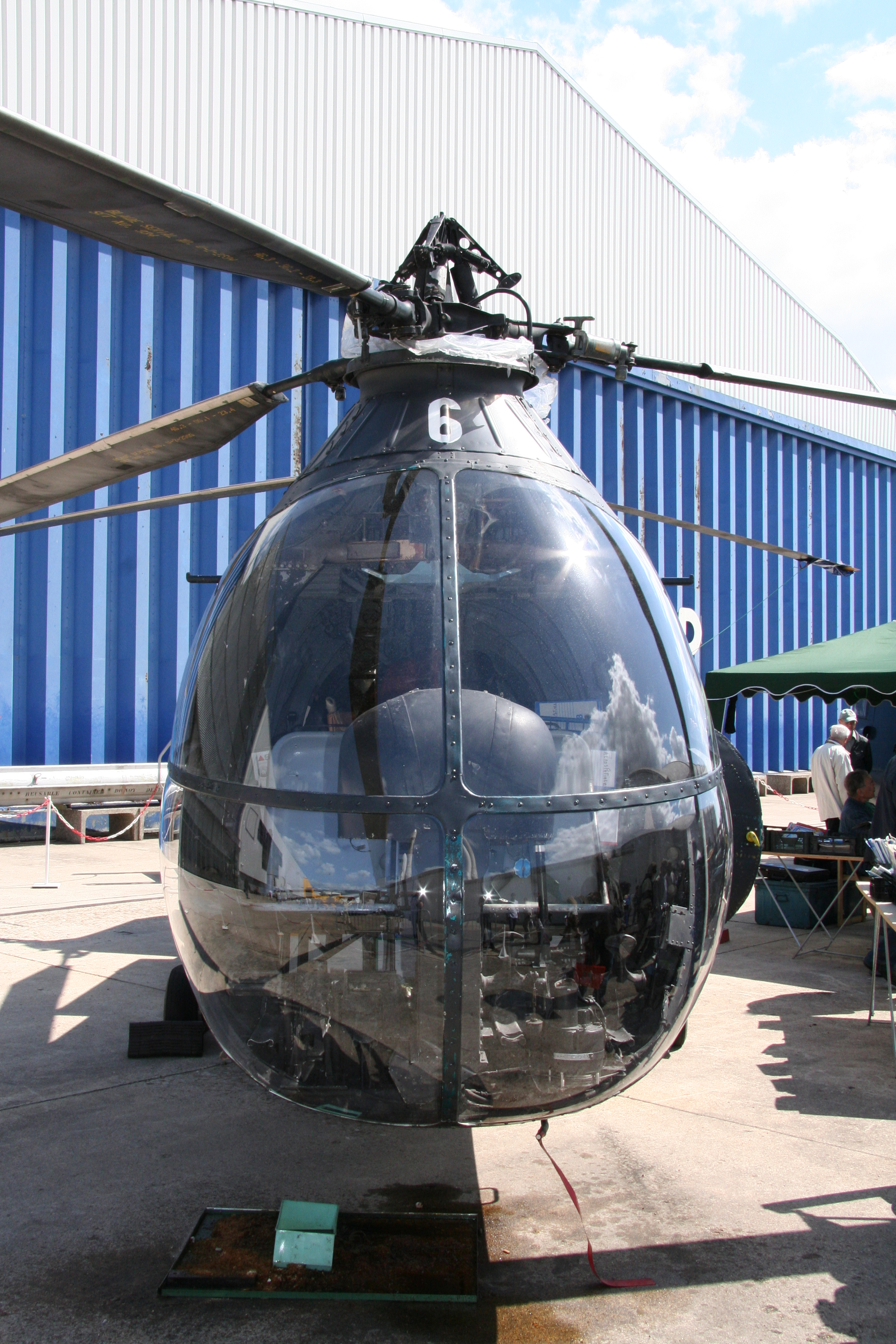
Head on view

The design was a product of a competition by the U.S. Navy in 1945 for a compact utility/rescue helicopter to operate from ships including aircraft carriers, battleships, and cruisers. Either 2 or 3 prototypes—designated PV-14 by the factory and XHJP-1 by the Navy—were built and subjected to a side-by-side flight evaluation against the 3 prototypes of the Sikorsky XHJS-1; however, the XHJS was fundamentally a scaled-up version of the Sikorsky H-5, and the increased weight and size magnified the design's problems with maintaining proper weight and balance under varying loading conditions. The Piasecki won the competition, and with the introduction of the aircraft configuration letter "U" for Utility in the 1950s, the aircraft was ordered for production as the HUP-1.

The design featured two three-bladed, 35-foot-diameter (11 m) rotors in tandem in which blades could be folded for storage; the relatively small rotor diameter allowed the aircraft to use aircraft carrier elevators with its blades fully extended. The tandem overlapping rotor configuration was a development by Piasecki and was used in future helicopter designs by the company and successors including the H-21, HRB-1/CH-46, and CH-47. The original HUP-1 was powered by a single Continental R-975-34 radial engine, with a take-off rating of 525 hp (391 kW), while later versions used the uprated R-975-42 or R-975-46A with 550 hp (410 kW). To aid search and rescue (SAR) operations, the aircraft was equipped with an overhead winch capable of lifting 400 lb (181 kg), which could lower a rescue sling through an electrically operated door available after the copilot's seat was folded forward.

During a flight demonstration of its capability to withstand high g-force, the type became the first helicopter to perform a loop, albeit unintentionally.

== Operational history ==
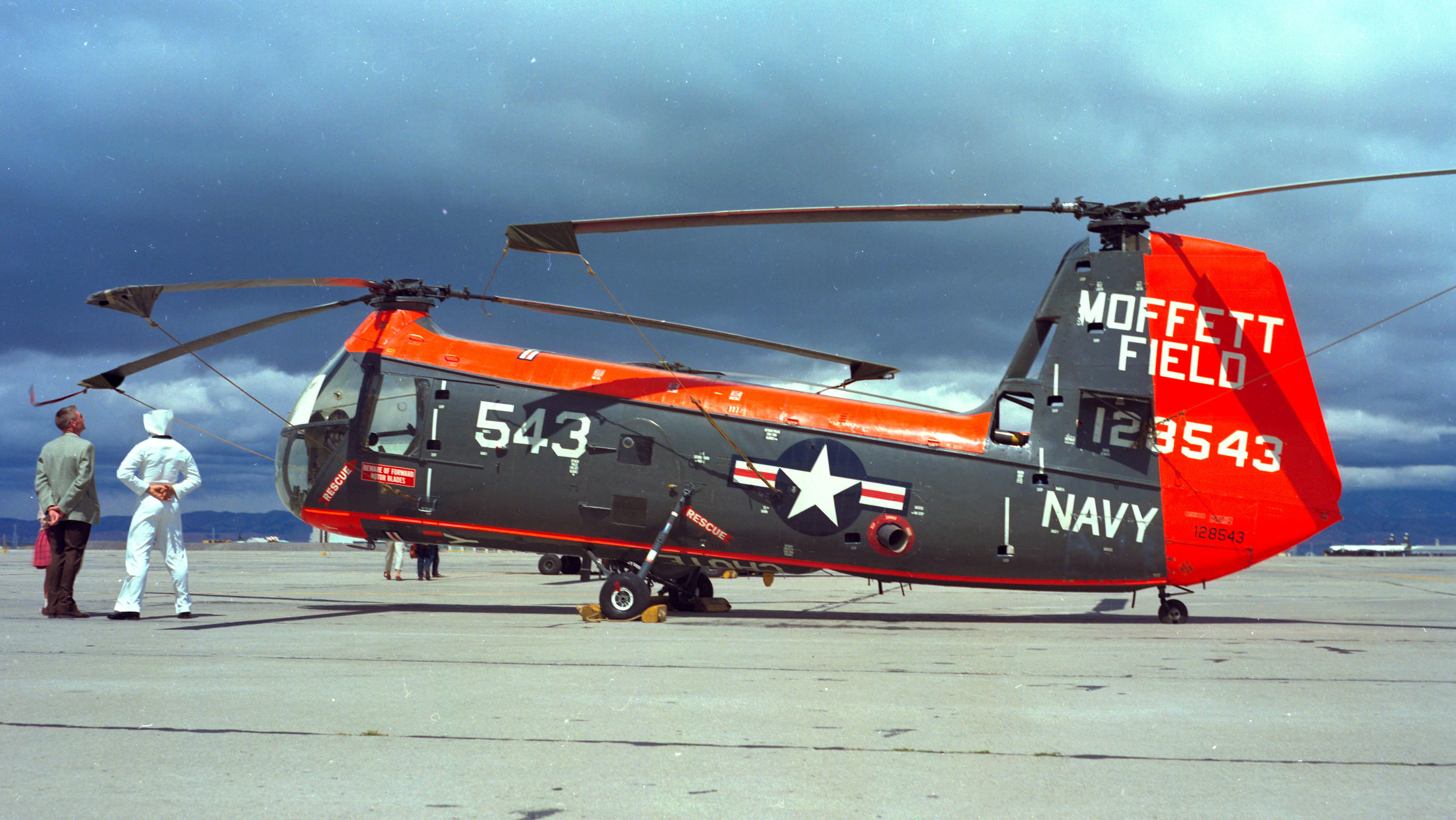
HUP-2 at Moffett Field

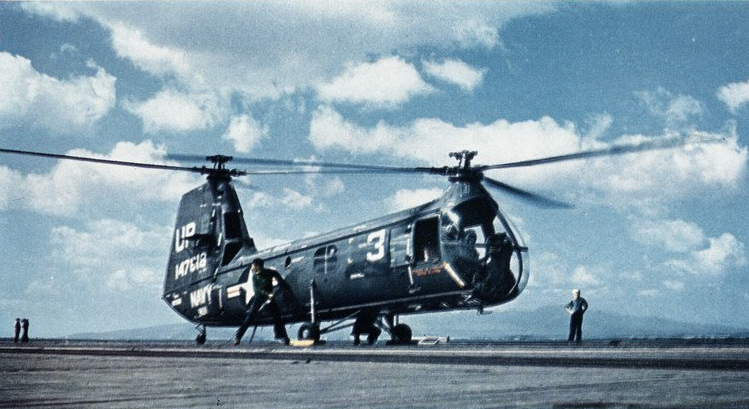
HUP-3 Retriever on the USS Lexington

The aircraft first entered service in February 1949 with the delivery of the first of 32 HUP-1 aircraft to the US Navy. The improved HUP-2 (Piasecki designation PV-18) was soon introduced with a more powerful engine, deletion of the inward-canted horizontal stabilizer endplate fins, and various minor changes in equipment; a sub-variant equipped with dunking sonar for anti-submarine warfare was given the designation HUP-2S. The HUP-2 was the first production helicopter equipped with an autopilot. The US Navy also tested a radio navigation system called Raydist that allowed an unmanned HUP-2 to be directed from a ground station and by radio ordered to hover within five feet (1.5 m) of the desired point. Edo tested a HUP-2 with a fiberglass hull and outrigger floats for amphibious operations.

An upgraded version of the HUP-2 was built for the US Army and designated as the H-25A Army Mule, but most were quickly withdrawn from Army service and converted for naval use under the designation HUP-3.

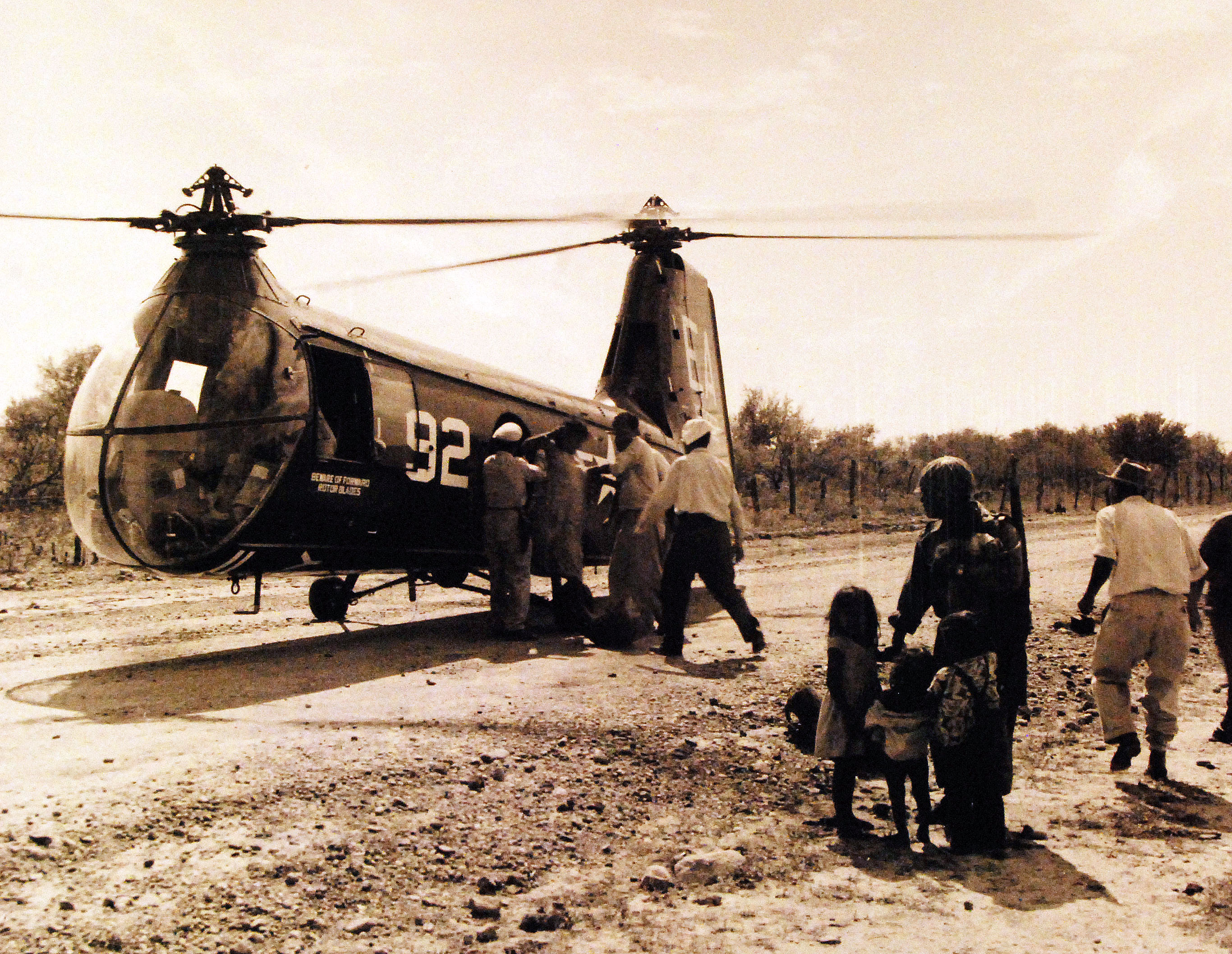
A HUP on disaster relief mission in 1955 for Hurricane Janet

In 1954, the Royal Canadian Navy received three former US Army H-25A aircraft, which were modified and redesignated on delivery to conform to US Navy HUP-3 standards. The aircraft were used aboard HMCS Labrador for search and rescue and varied utility duties, and were later used to support construction at Distant Early Warning Line radar sites. The helicopters were subsequently posted to NAF Patricia Bay and naval air station HMCS Shearwater; after the last two were stricken from inventory on 18 January 1964, one aircraft was donated to a technical school and the other two were sold as surplus.

The US Army H-25 designation was adopted by the US Navy in 1962 on introduction of the 1962 United States Tri-Service aircraft designation system. The final units were withdrawn from US service in 1964. It also served with French Naval Aviation (Aeronavale) from 1953 to 1965.

A total of 339 aircraft were delivered during the 6-year production run. A large number of surplus US Navy aircraft later appeared on the US civil registry, and at least seven were transferred to the French Navy.

On 7 November 2009, former US Navy HUP-1, BuNo 124925, civil registration number N183YP, collided with high-voltage power lines in Adelanto, California; the subsequent crash and post-crash fire killed all 3 occupants and substantially damaged the aircraft. Operated in association with Classic Rotors, the accident aircraft was the only airworthy example in the world. The National Transportation Safety Board attributed the crash to "The pilot’s failure to maintain clearance from powerlines during en route flight."

== Variants ==
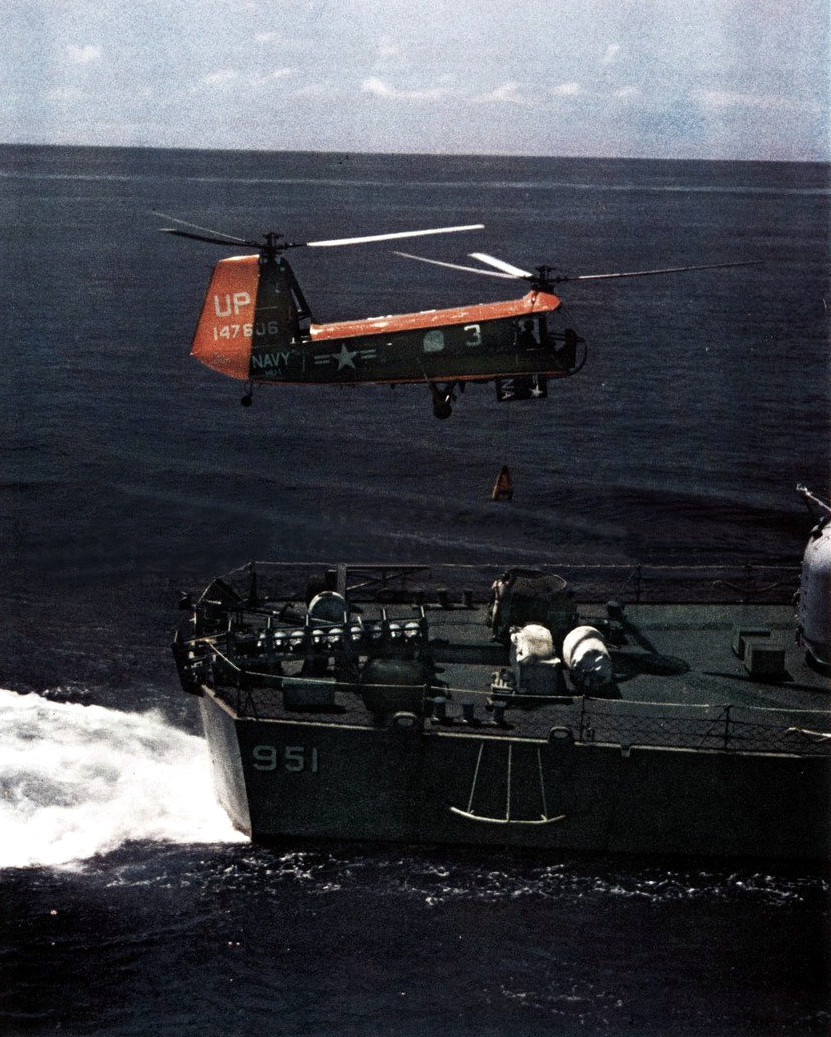
HUP-3 delivers mail to the USS Turner Joy (DD-951)

XHJP-1
Prototype, powered by a 525 hp (391 kW) Continental R-975-34 piston engine, equipped with large sloping endplate fins on the horizontal stabilizers. Piasecki-Vertol designation was PV-14. 2 or 3 produced.

HUP-1
Utility transport and search and rescue helicopter for the US Navy, largely similar to XHJP-1, Piasecki designation was PV-18. 32 built.

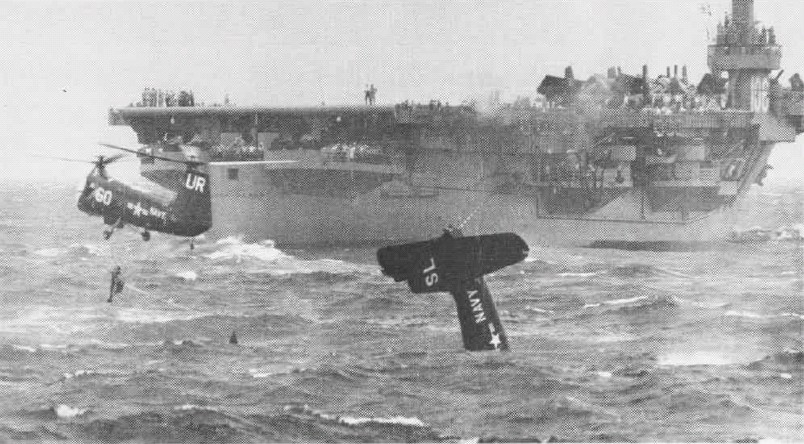
A U.S. Navy HUP plane guard conducting a rescue in 1953

HUP-2
Improved version, 550 hp (410 kW) Continental R-975-42 piston engine, horizontal stabilizer endplate fins eliminated. 165 built for the US Navy, 15 for French Aeronavale. Redesignated UH-25B in 1962.

HUP-2S
Anti-submarine warfare version of HUP-2 fitted with dunking sonar. 12 built.

HUP-3
Naval utility conversion of H-25A aircraft transferred from US Army: 50 to US Navy, 3 to Royal Canadian Navy.

H-25A Army Mule
Utility transport helicopter for US Army, similar to HUP-2 but powered by a 550 hp (410 kW) Continental R-975-46A piston engine, and fitted with large doors, power-boosted controls, and strengthened floors. 70 were delivered from 1953, but they were unsuitable for front-line use, with 53 transferred to the Royal Canadian and US Navies in 1954–1955, and the remaining helicopters used for training, being withdrawn from army service by 1958.

UH-25B
HUP-2 redesignated after 1962.

UH-25C
HUP-3 redesignated after 1962.

== Operators ==
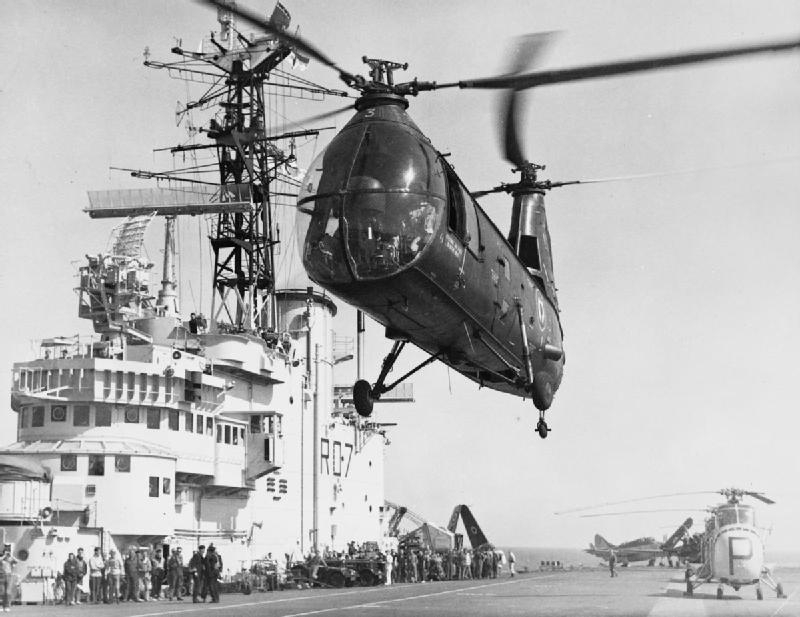
French HUP lands on HMS Albion (R07) in 1957

Canada

- Royal Canadian Navy

France

- French Navy

United States

- United States Army
- United States Navy

== Surviving aircraft ==
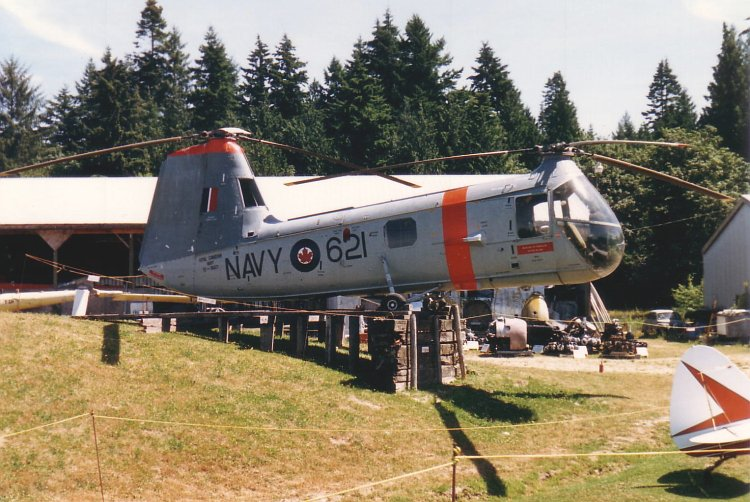
Royal Canadian Navy HUP-3 51-16621 at the Canadian Museum of Flight; this aircraft was later traded to Classic Rotors.

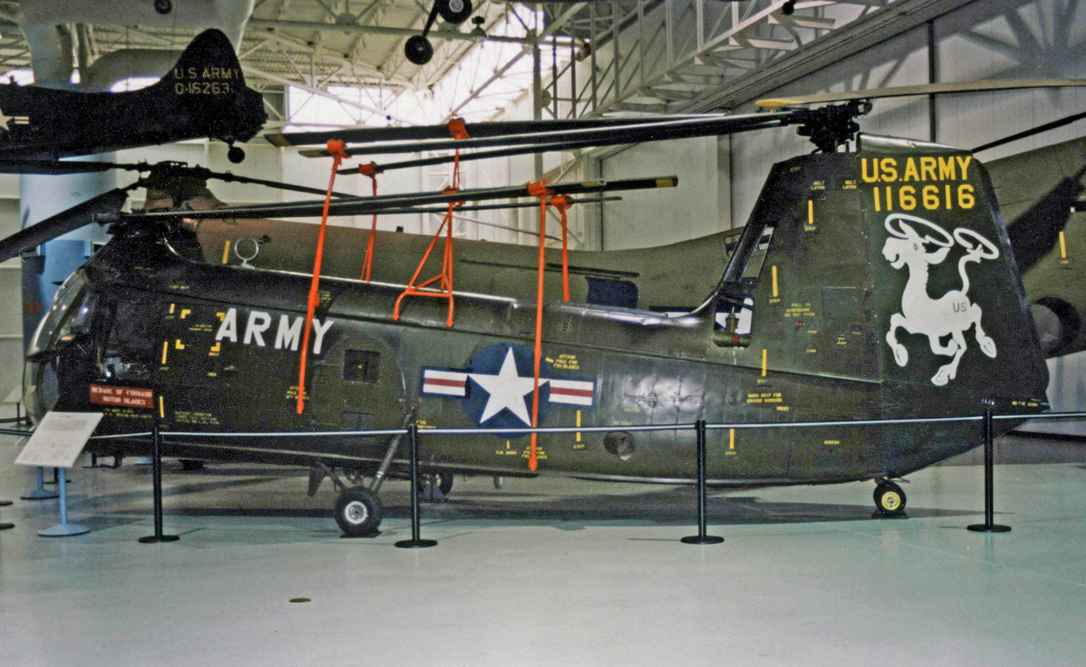
H-25A Army Mule preserved in the US Army Aviation Museum, Alabama

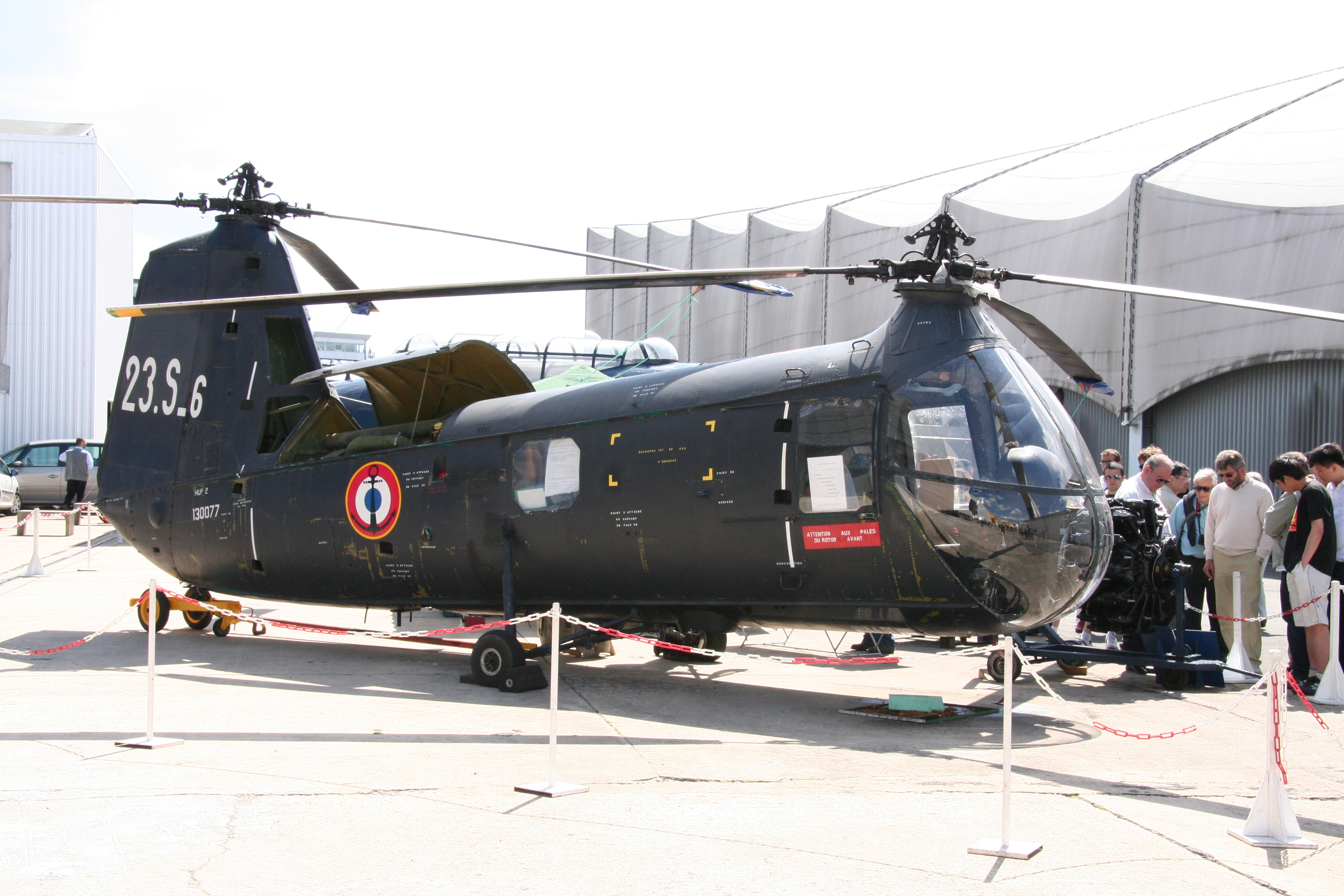
French H-25/HUP at the 2009 Paris Air Show

For surviving aircraft, hyphenated numbers are original US Army Serial Numbers; six-digit numbers are original US Navy Bureau of Aeronautics (BuAer) Bureau Numbers (BuNo). All 50 H-25A/HUP-3 aircraft transferred from the US Army to the US Navy were given new bureau numbers; 3 aircraft transferred to the Royal Canadian Navy were redesignated, but retained their original US Army serial numbers.

=== Canada ===
On display

- UH-25B (HUP-2) 128529 at Shearwater Aviation Museum in Shearwater, Nova Scotia. This aircraft has been restored to the appearance of 51-16621, the first Royal Canadian Navy HUP-3.
- UH-25C (HUP-3), 51-16623 - Canada Aviation and Space Museum in Ottawa, Ontario.

=== Netherlands ===
- UH-25B (HUP-2), 130076 (construction number 253) – Baris Business Park roadway roundabout in Rotterdam. This aircraft was originally used by the US Navy and was later transferred to the French Navy.

=== United Kingdom ===
- UH-25C (HUP-3), 51-16622 – displayed at The Helicopter Museum in Weston-super-Mare, England, wearing Canadian markings.

=== United States ===
On display

H-25A Army Mule

- 51-16616 – United States Army Aviation Museum in Fort Rucker, Alabama.

HUP-1

- 124915 – USS Hornet Museum in Alameda, California.

UH-25B (HUP-2)

- 128479 – American Helicopter Museum in West Chester, Pennsylvania.
- 128517 – Wings of Freedom Aviation Museum in Horsham, Pennsylvania.
- 128519 – Intrepid Sea, Air & Space Museum in New York City, New York.
- 128596 – Flying Leatherneck Aviation Museum in San Diego, California.

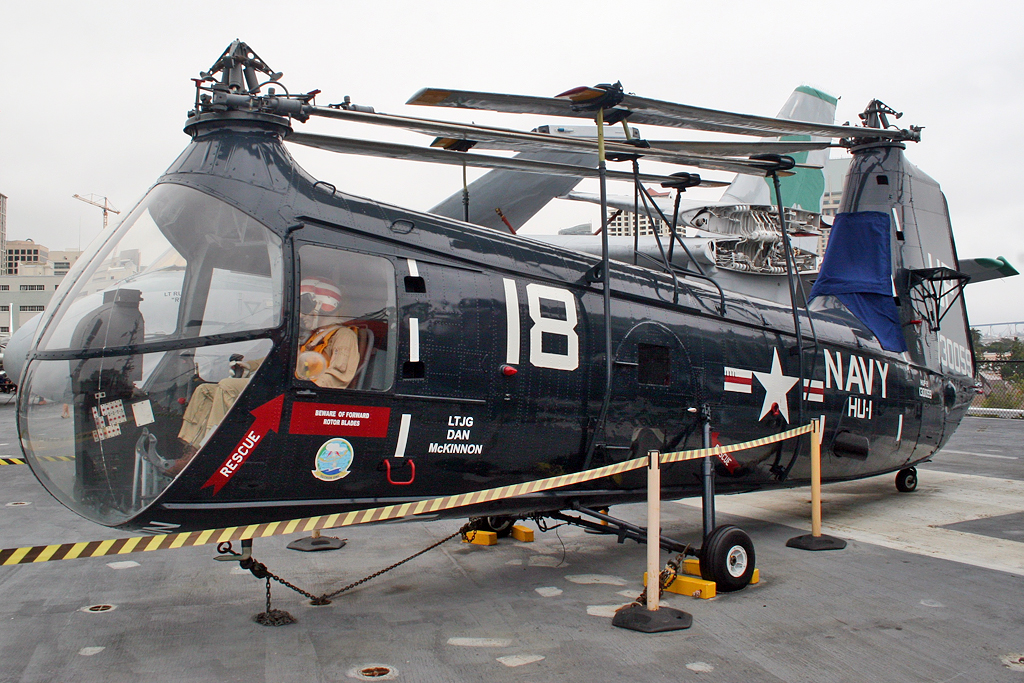
HUP-2 Retriever at the USS Midway museum

- 130059 – USS Midway Museum in San Diego, California.
- 130082 – on the deck of the USS Iowa Museum in San Pedro, California.

UH-25C (HUP-3)

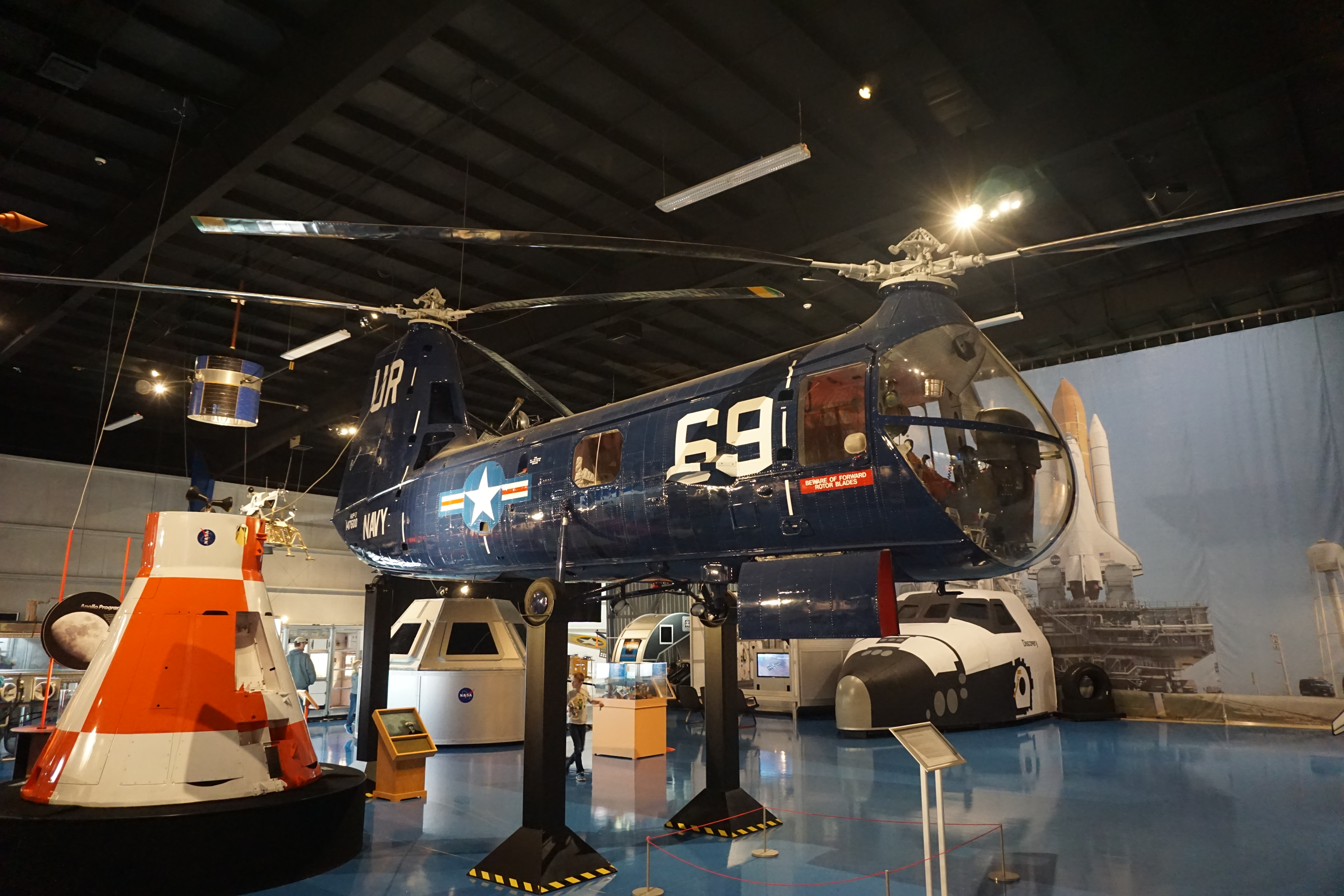
HUP-3 Retriever on display at the Air Zoo

- 147595 – Pima Air & Space Museum in Tucson, Arizona.
- 147600 – Air Zoo in Kalamazoo, Michigan.
- 147607 – National Naval Aviation Museum in Pensacola, Florida.
- 147628 – Mid-America Air Museum in Liberal, Kansas.
- 51-16621 – Classic Rotors in Ramona, California. As of December 2019, this is the only Piasecki Helicopter-manufactured aircraft with valid FAA aircraft registration. This former Royal Canadian Navy aircraft is reportedly the last HUP/H-25 capable of being restored to airworthy condition; it was exchanged in 2000 by the Canadian Museum of Flight for unflyable HUP-2 128529, which was subsequently traded again in 2002 to the Shearwater Aviation Museum and repainted as 51-16621.

Under restoration or in storage

UH-25B (HUP-2)

- 128598 - Stored at New England Air Museum in Windsor Locks, Connecticut.
- 130053 – Stored at Quartzsite, Arizona.
- 130063 - Stored at New England Air Museum in Windsor Locks, Connecticut.

UH-25C (HUP-3)

- 147610 – Yanks Air Museum in Chino, California, in storage.

== Specifications (HUP-2) ==

Data from Jane's All The World's Aircraft 1956–57.

General characteristics

- Crew: two
- Capacity: four passengers
- Length: 56 ft 11 in (17.35 m)
- Height: 13 ft 2 in (4.01 m)
- Empty weight: 4,132 lb (1,874 kg)
- Gross weight: 5,750 lb (2,608 kg)
- Max takeoff weight: 6,100 lb (2,767 kg)
- Powerplant: 1 × Continental R-975-46A 9-cylinder air-cooled radial piston engine, 550 hp (410 kW)
- Main rotor diameter: 2 × 35 ft 0 in (10.67 m)
- Main rotor area: 1,924.5 sq ft (178.79 m^{2}) * Blade section: NACA 0012

Performance

- Maximum speed: 105 mph (169 km/h, 91 kn)
- Cruise speed: 80 mph (130 km/h, 70 kn)
- Range: 340 mi (550 km, 300 nmi)
- Service ceiling: 10,000 ft (3,000 m)
- Rate of climb: 1,000 ft/min (5.1 m/s)
- Disk loading: 3 lb/sq ft (15 kg/m^{2})
- Power/mass: 0.09 hp/lb (0.15 kW/kg)

== See also ==
Related development

- Piasecki H-21
- CH-46 Sea Knight

Aircraft of comparable role, configuration, and era

- Bell HSL
- Bristol Belvedere
- Harbin Z-5
- Mil Mi-4
- Sikorsky H-19 Chickasaw
