= List of aircraft in the Pima Air & Space Museum =

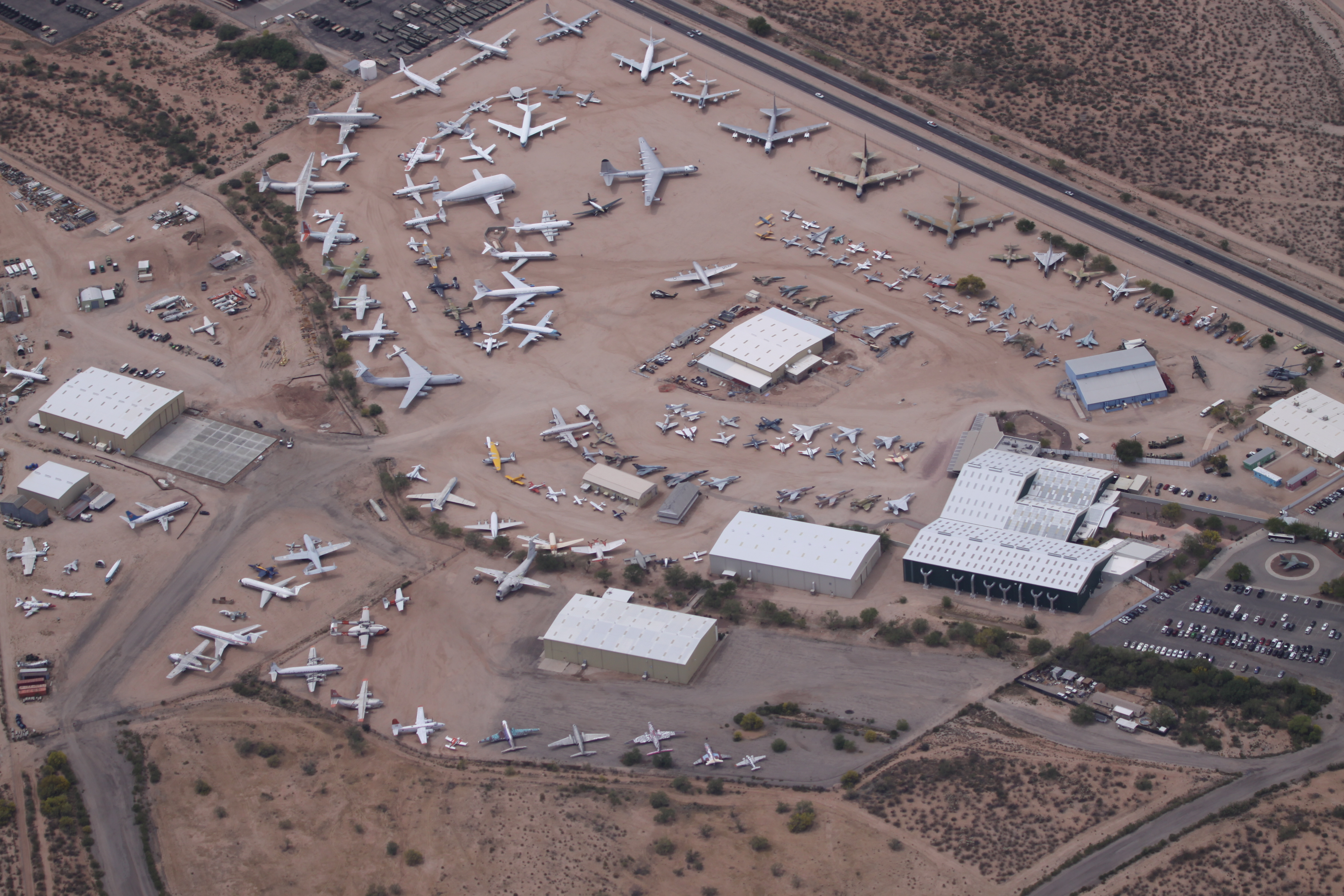
An aerial photo of the Pima Air & Space Museum in 2013

This is a list of aircraft in the collection of the Pima Air & Space Museum in Tucson, Arizona.

The identity of an aircraft may be its civil registration or its military serial number. An aircraft may have had civil use following its retirement from the military; furthermore an aircraft may not be displayed with the same identification as is listed here. Aircraft formerly operated by the United States civilian agency NASA, while civil registered, are identified separately to the other former civil-registered aircraft in the collection.

== Key ==
The key to military identities is as follows:

- AAC: British Army Air Corps
- FiAF: Finnish Air Force
- LSK: Luftstreitkräfte der Nationalen Volksarmee – East German Air Force
- LW: Luftwaffe – Air Force of Nazi Germany
- MF: Marineflieger – German Navy air arm
- RAAF: Royal Australian Air Force
- RAF: Royal Air Force
- RCAF: Royal Canadian Air Force
- RN: Royal Navy
- RSAF: Royal Saudi Air Force
- SwAF: Swiss Air Force
- USAAC: United States Army Air Corps
- USAAF: United States Army Air Forces
- USAF: United States Air Force
- USAr: United States Army
- USCG: United States Coast Guard
- USMC: United States Marine Corps
- USN: United States Navy
- WLOP: Wojska Lotnicze i Obrony Powietrznej – Polish Air Force

== Military aircraft ==
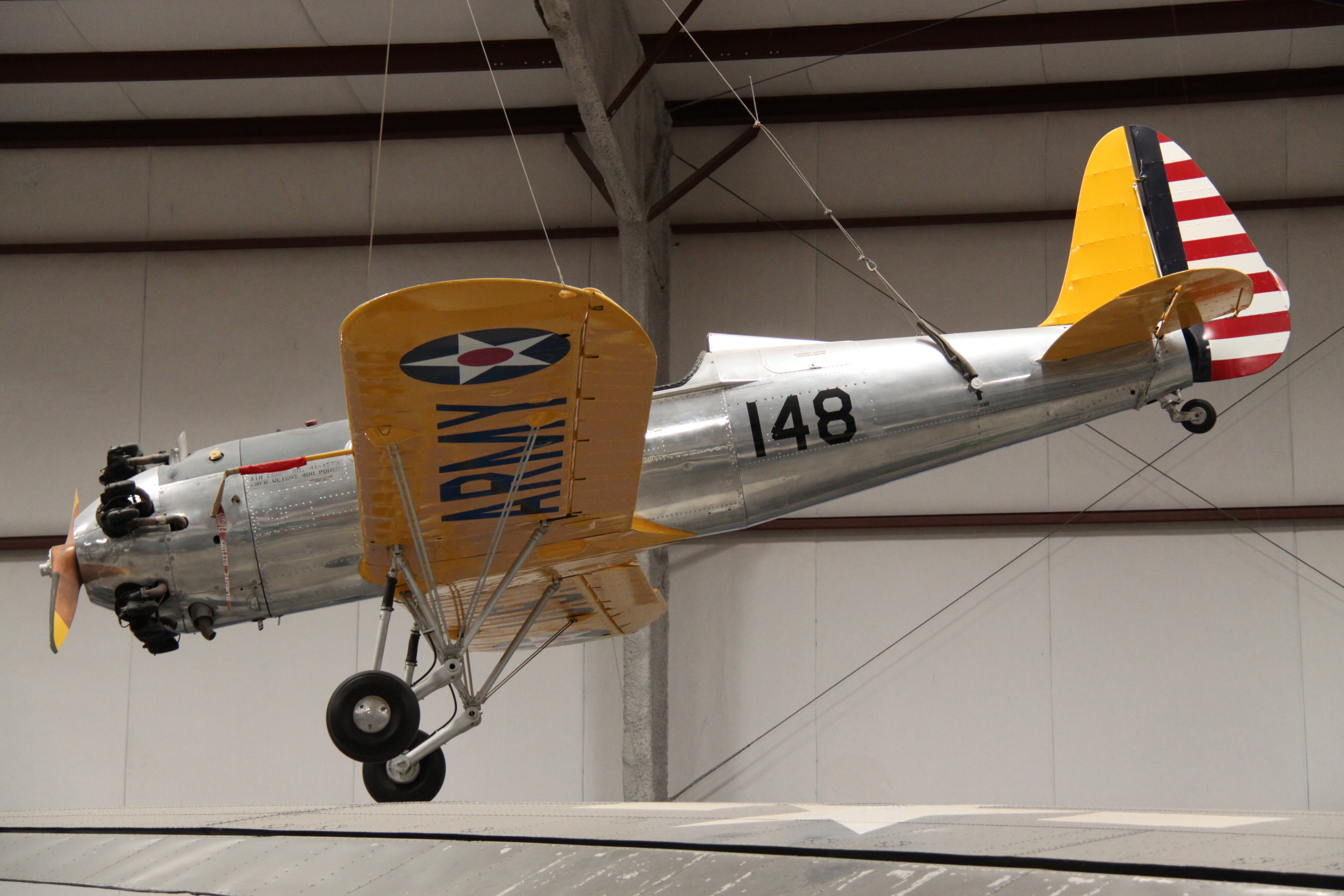
Ryan PT-22 Recruit trainer, U.S. Army

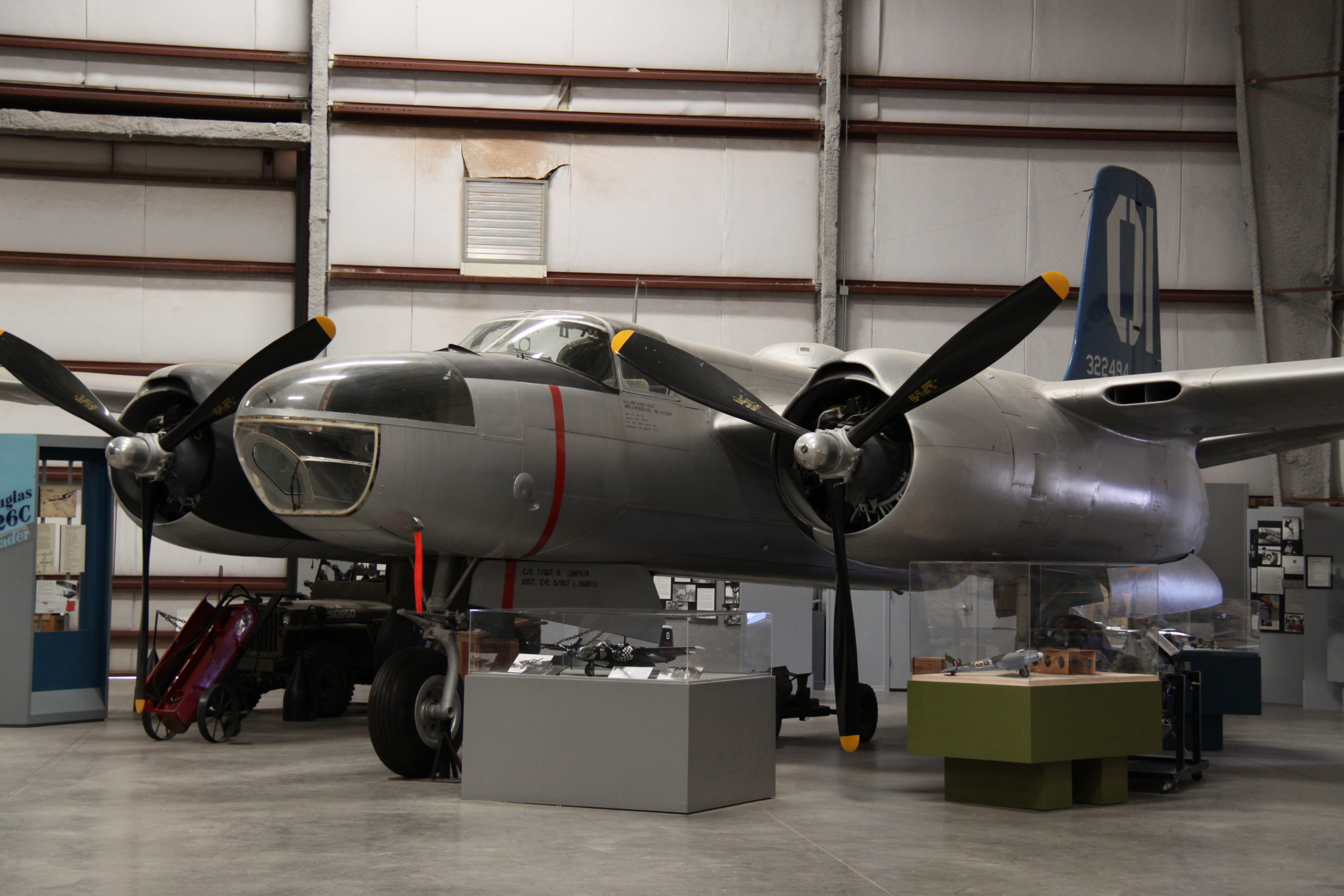
Douglas A-26C Invader

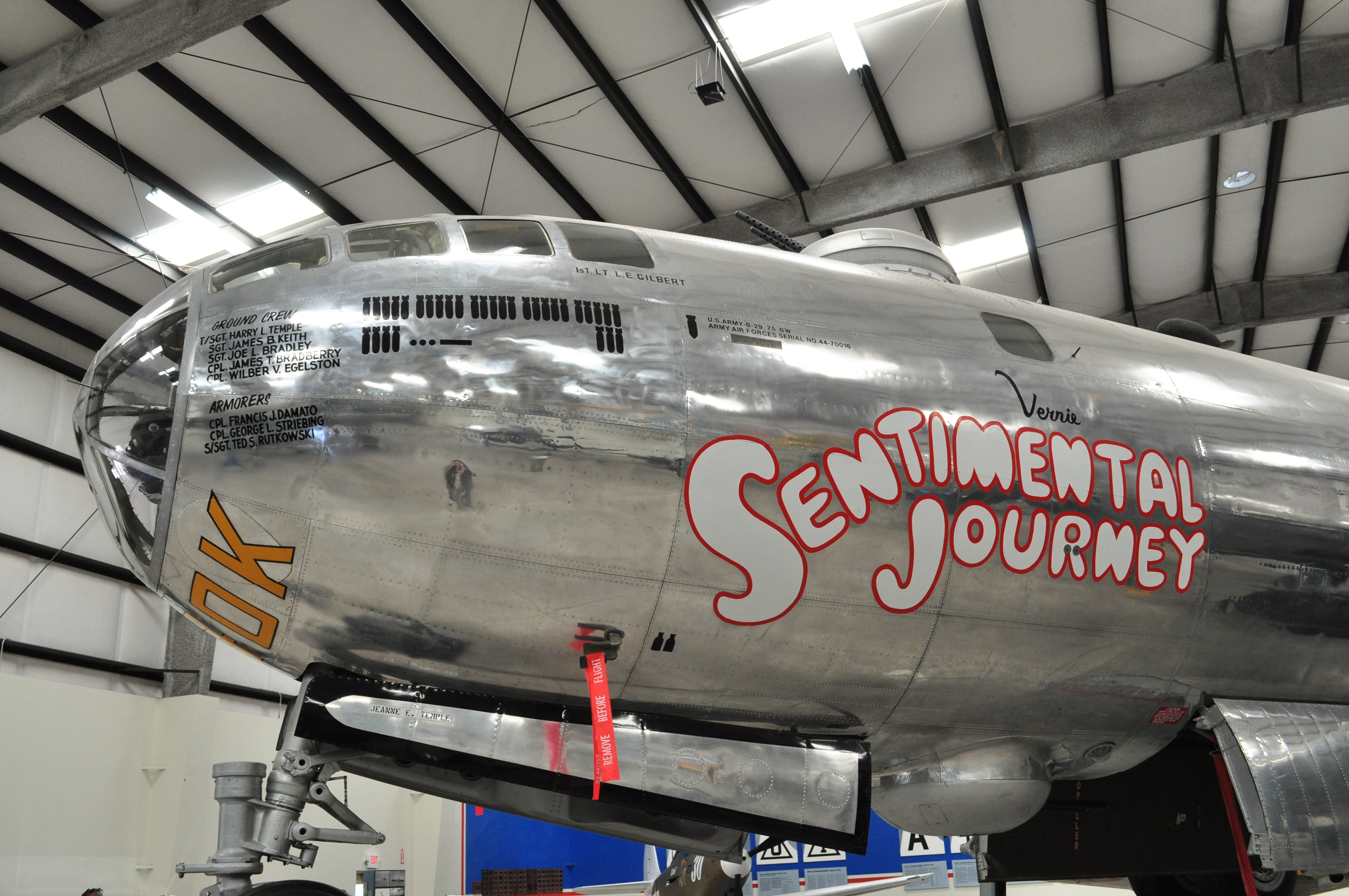
Boeing B-29 Superfortress 44-70016

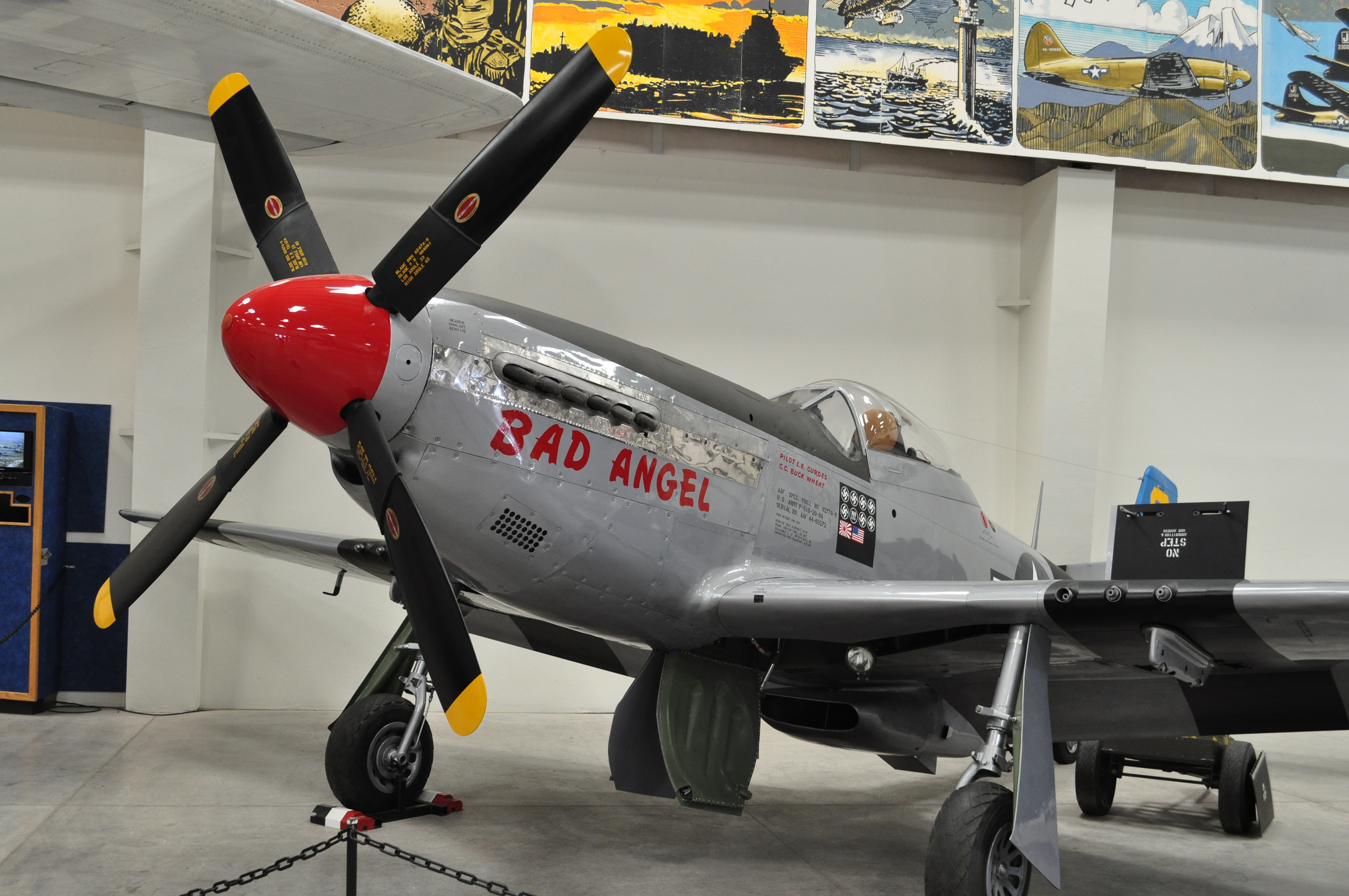
North American P-51D Mustang USAAF 44-63272

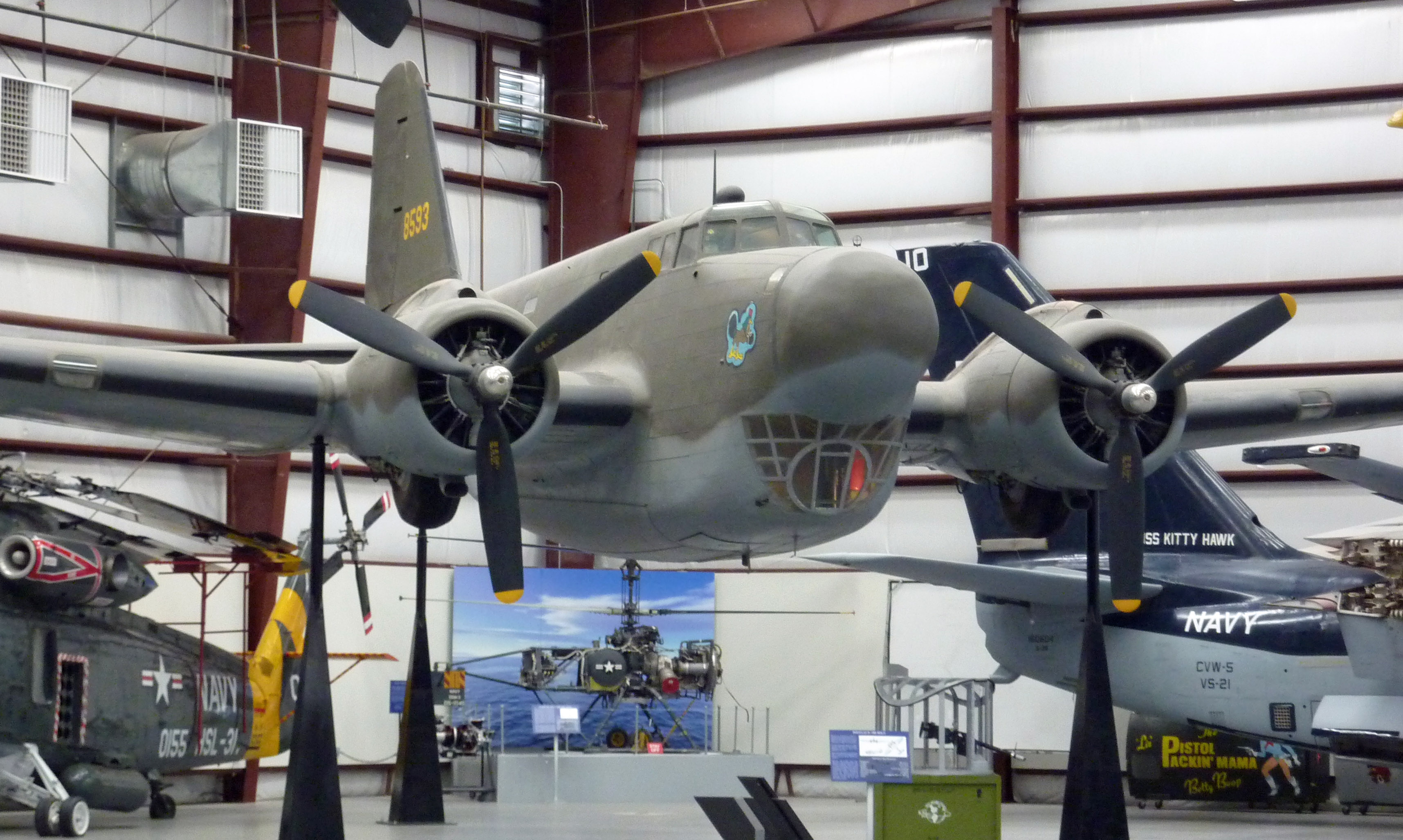
Douglas B-18 Bolo USAAF

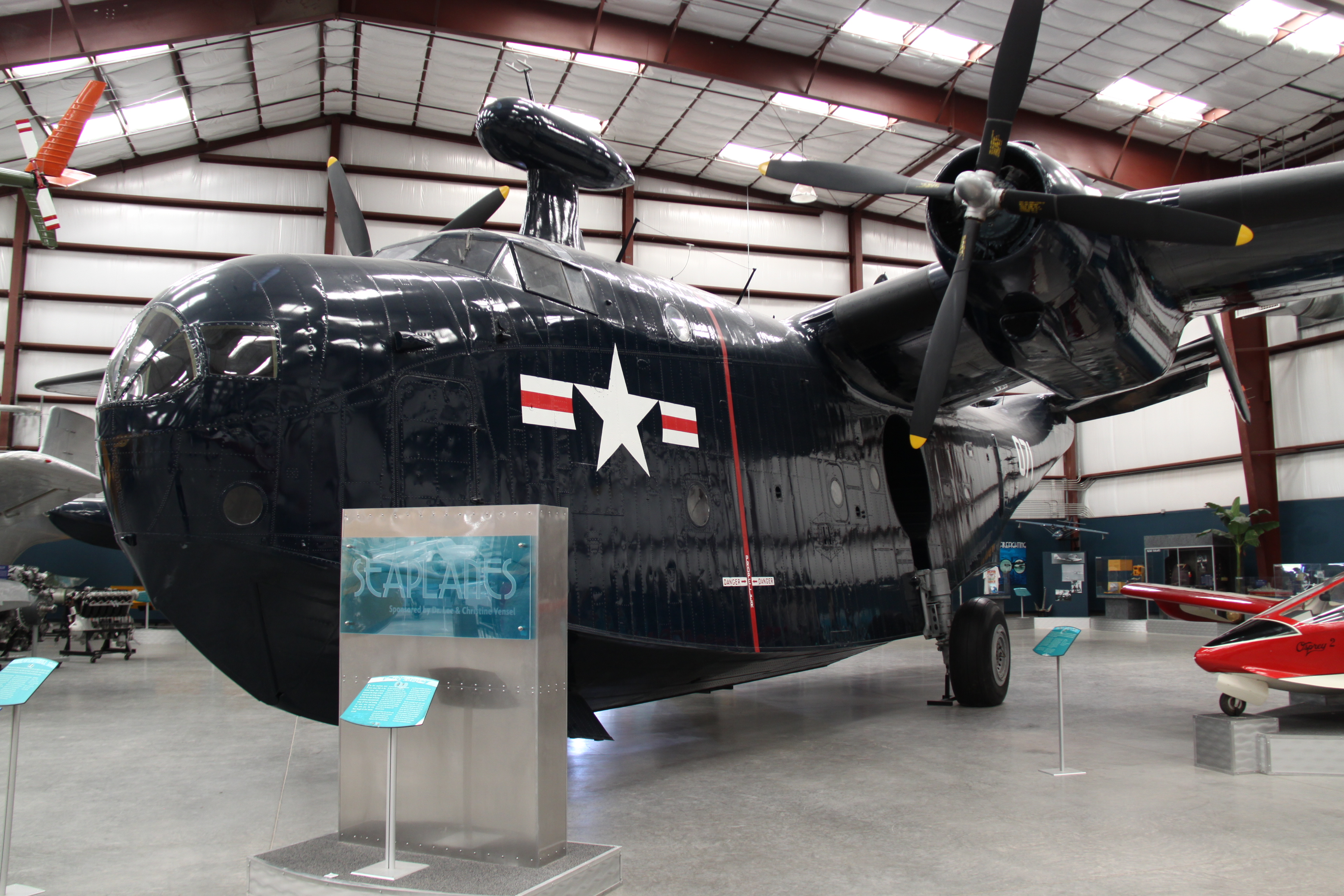
Martin PBM-5A Mariner, U.S. Navy

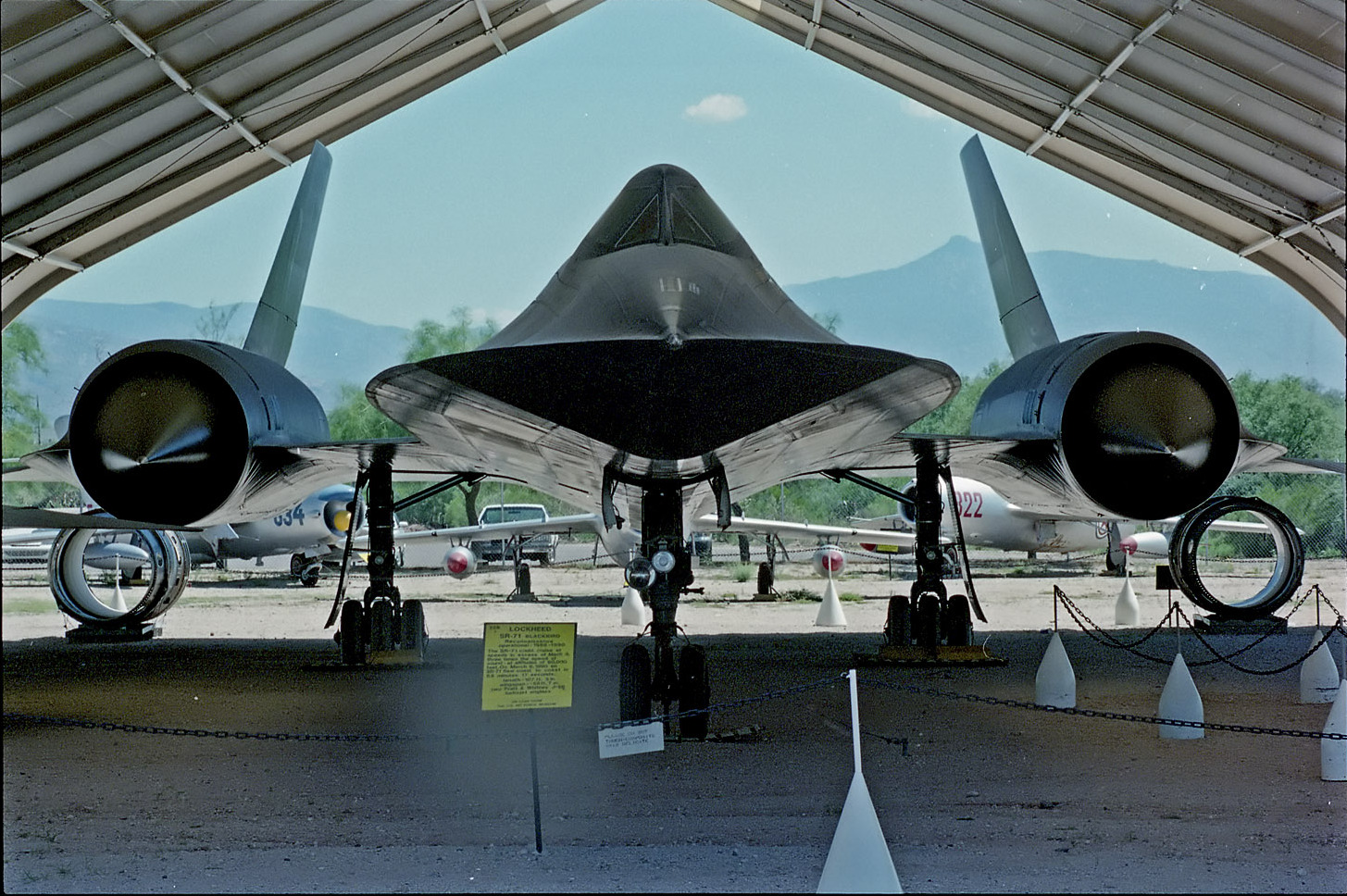
Lockheed SR-71 Blackbird. Since 1976, the world's fastest air-breathing manned aircraft.

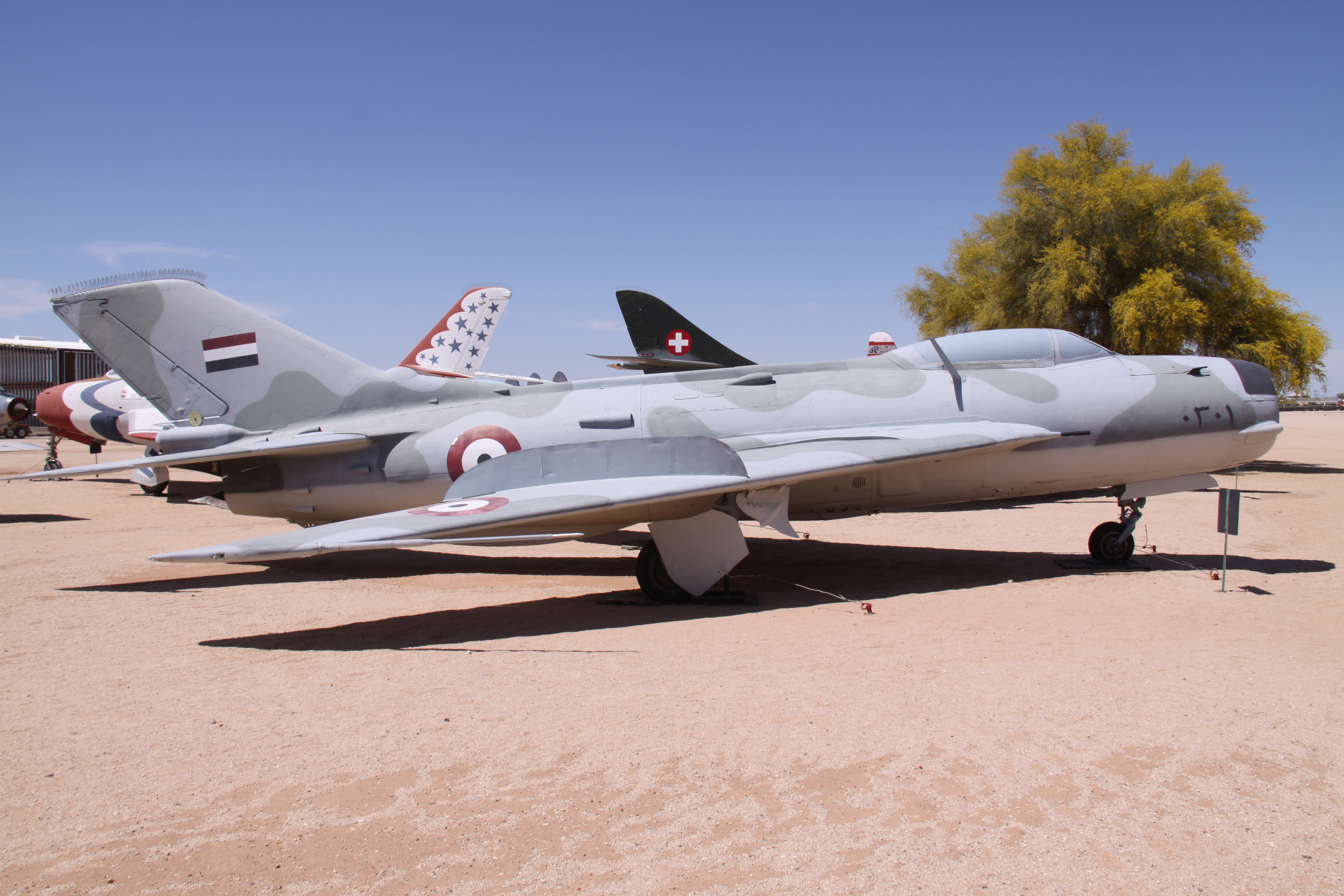
Shenyang F-6A (MiG-19), ex-Egyptian Air Force. Combatant in the Vietnam War.

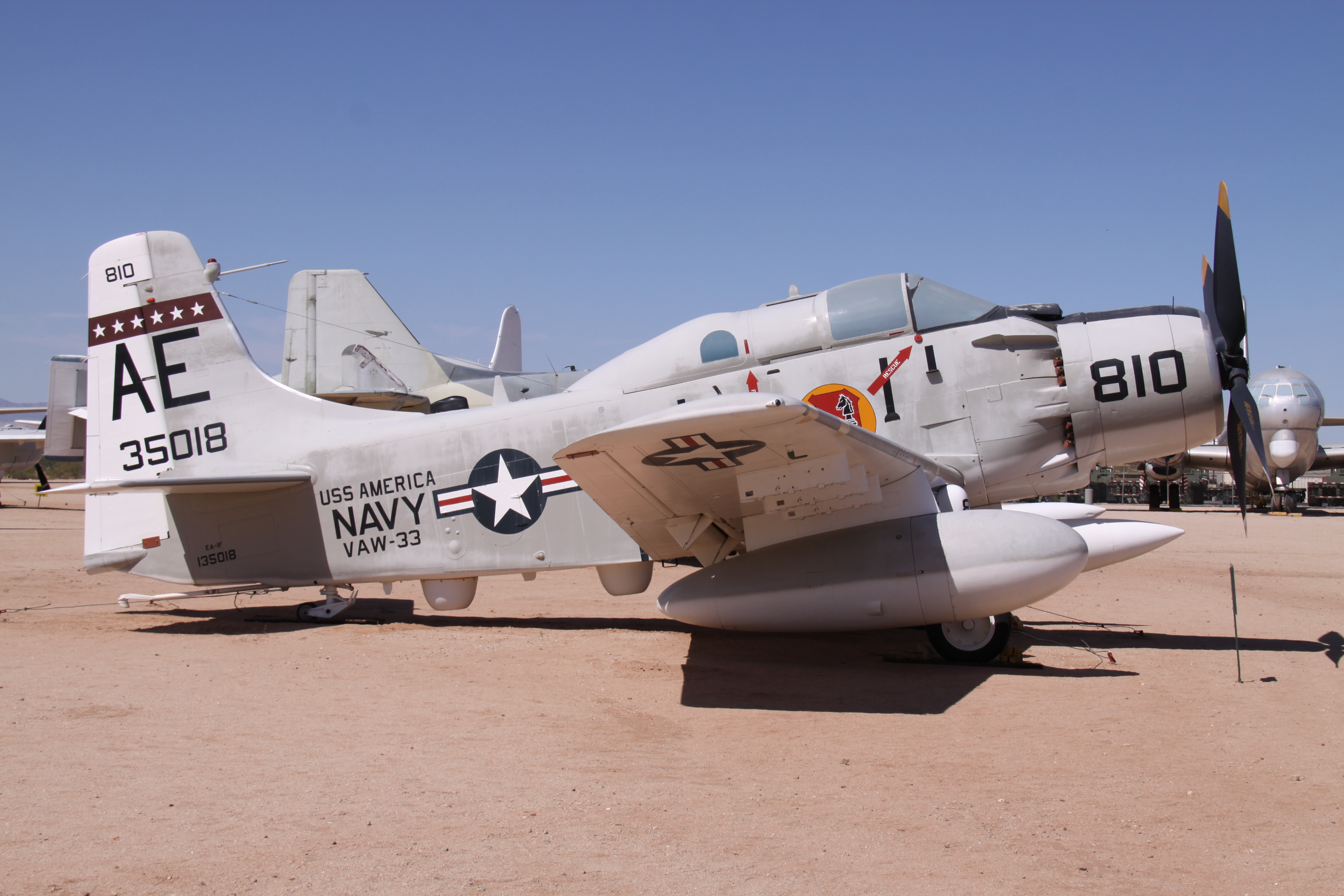
Douglas A-1 Skyraider, in service between the late 1940s and early 1980s.

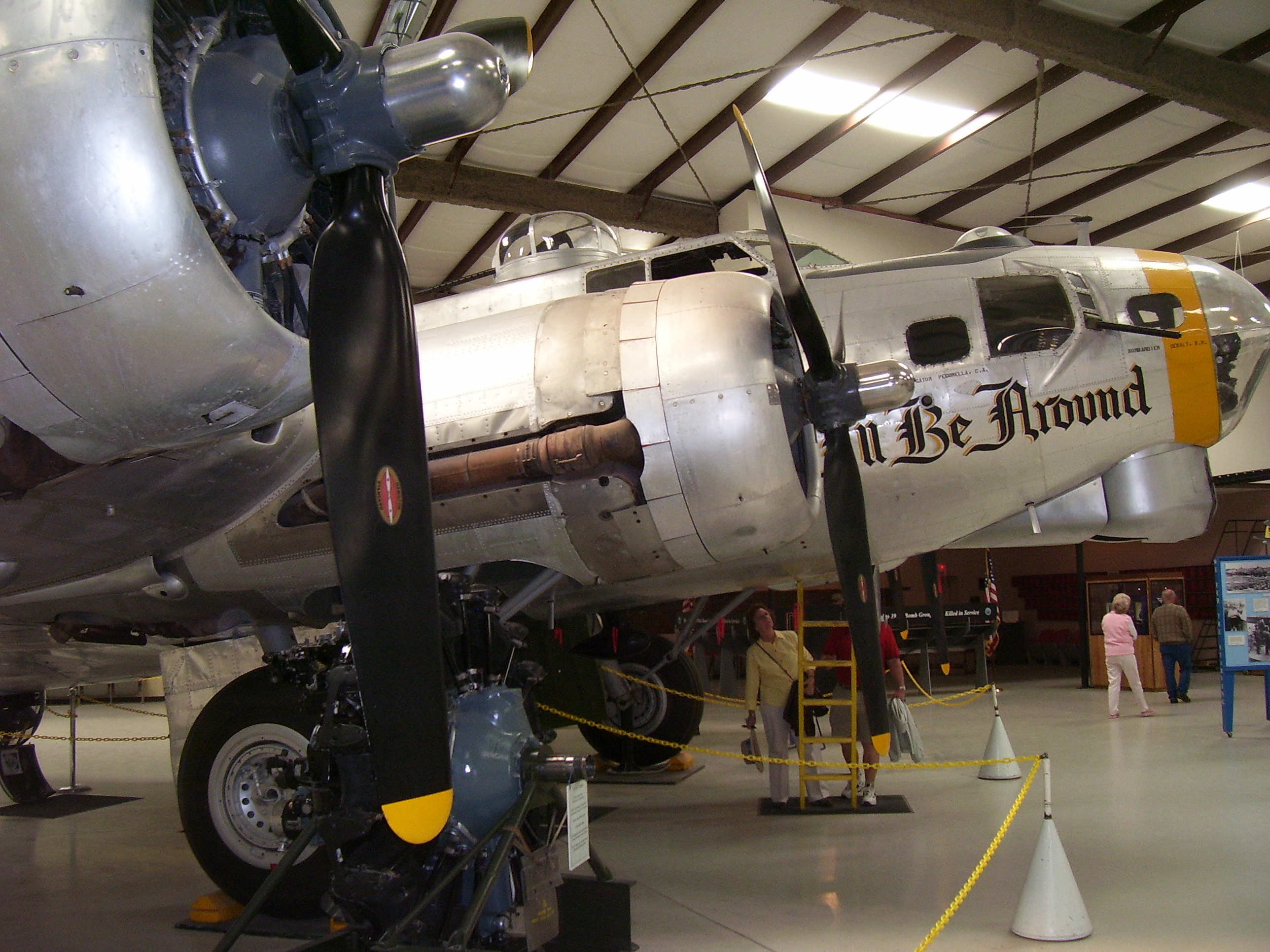
Boeing B-17G Flying Fortress 44–85828 on display as 42-31892 "I'll Be Around"

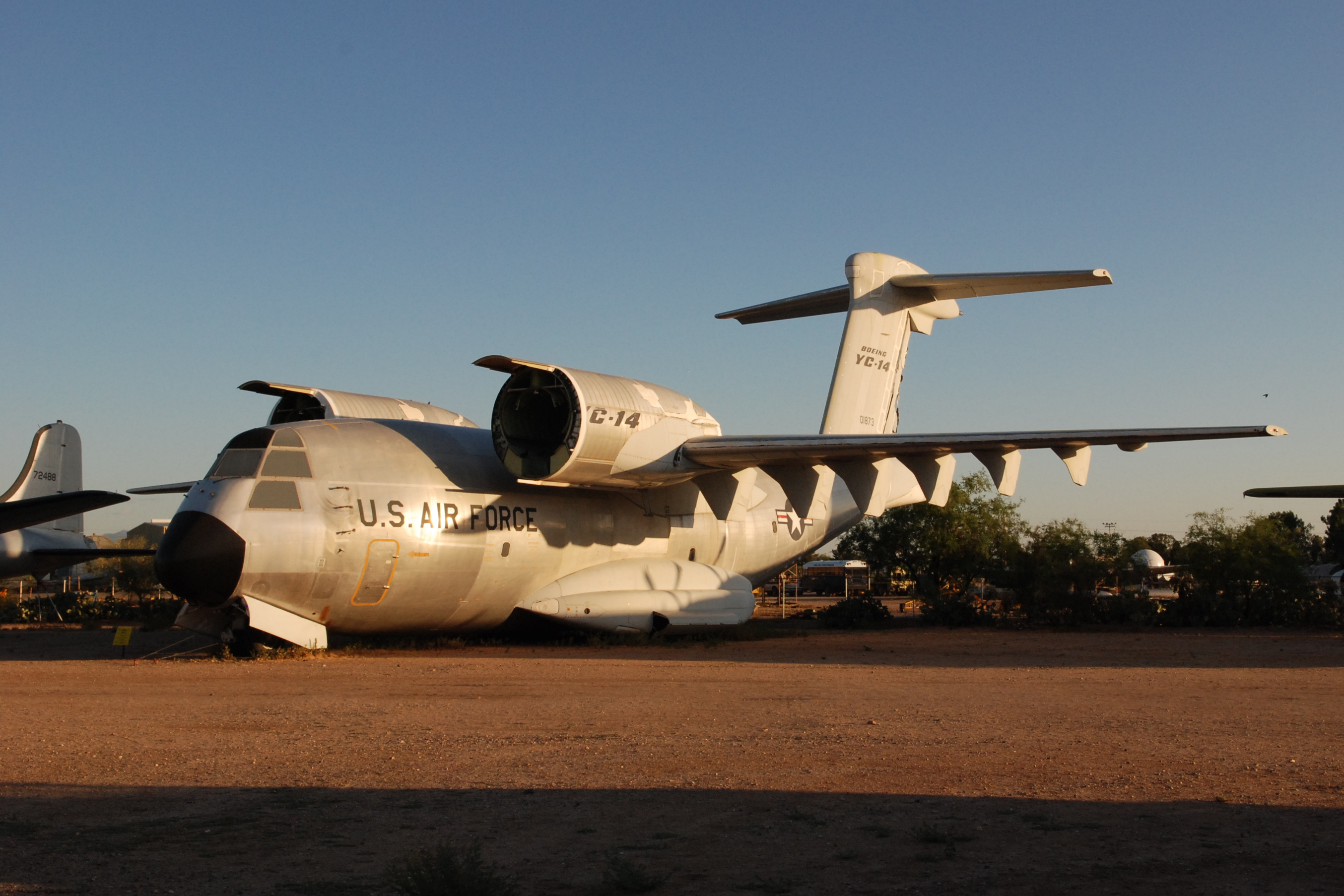
Boeing YC-14 first prototype

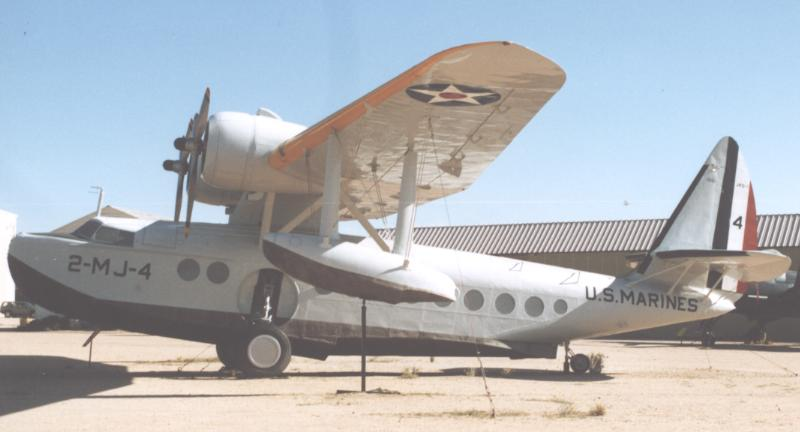
Sikorsky S-43 Seaplane

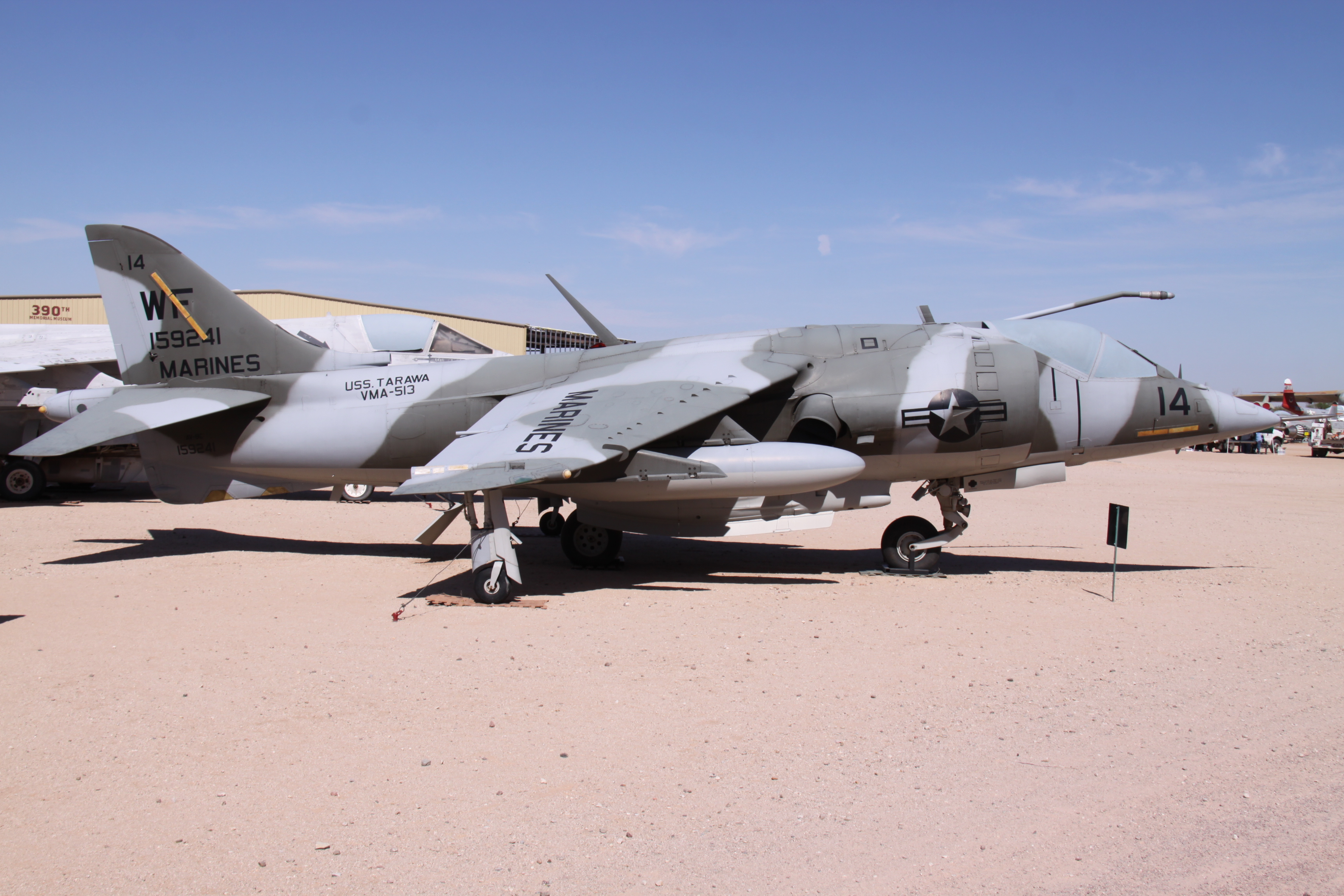
AV-8 Harrier USMC 159241

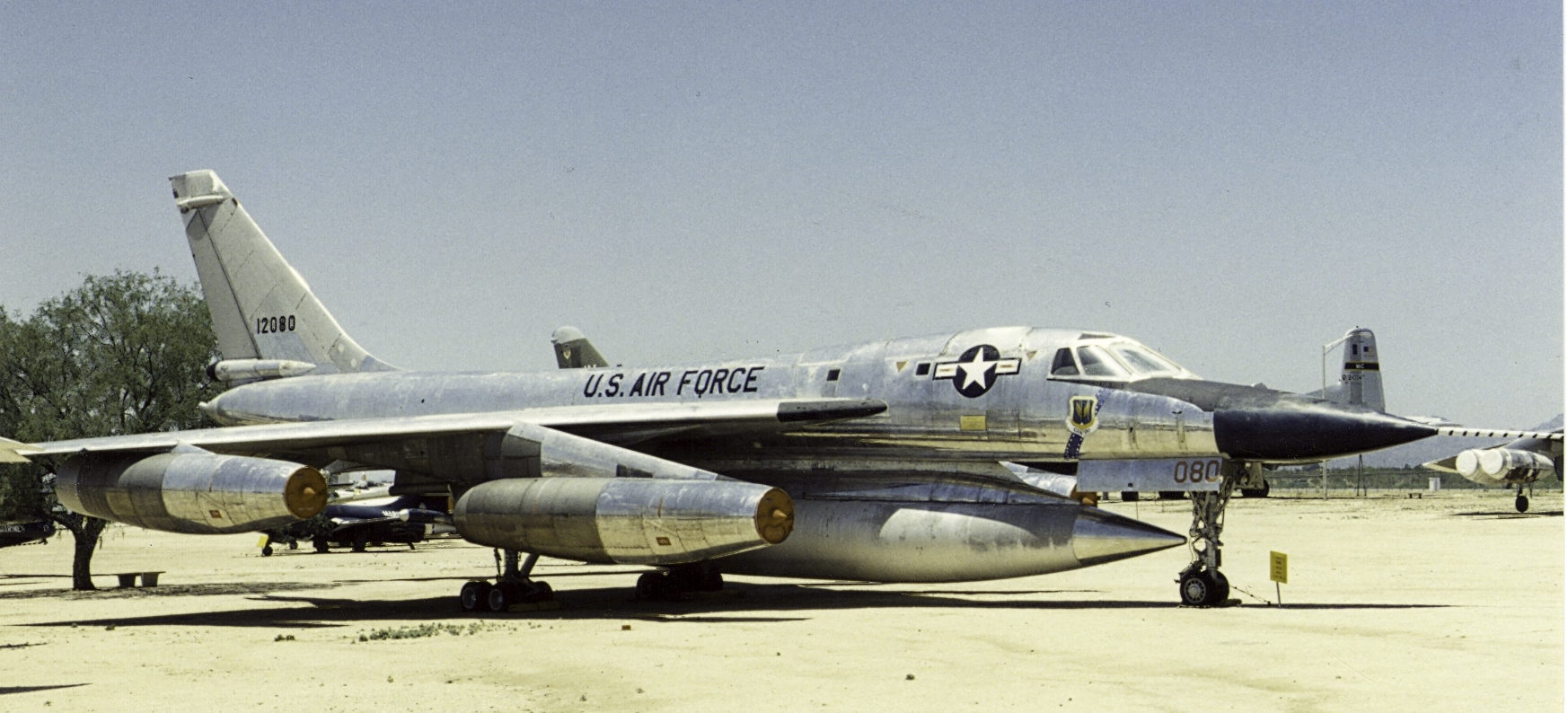
Convair B-58A Hustler

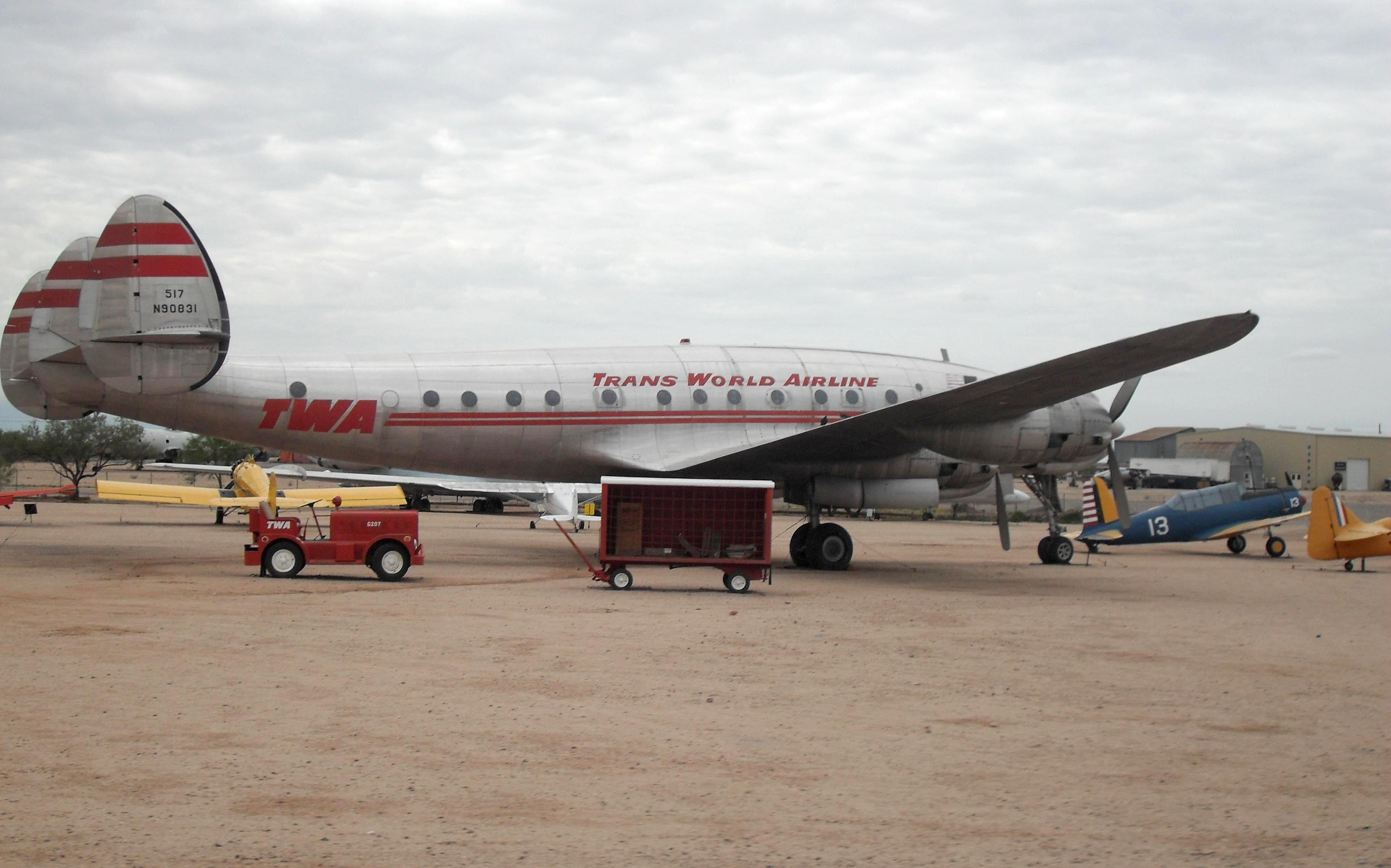
Lockheed L-049 Constellation

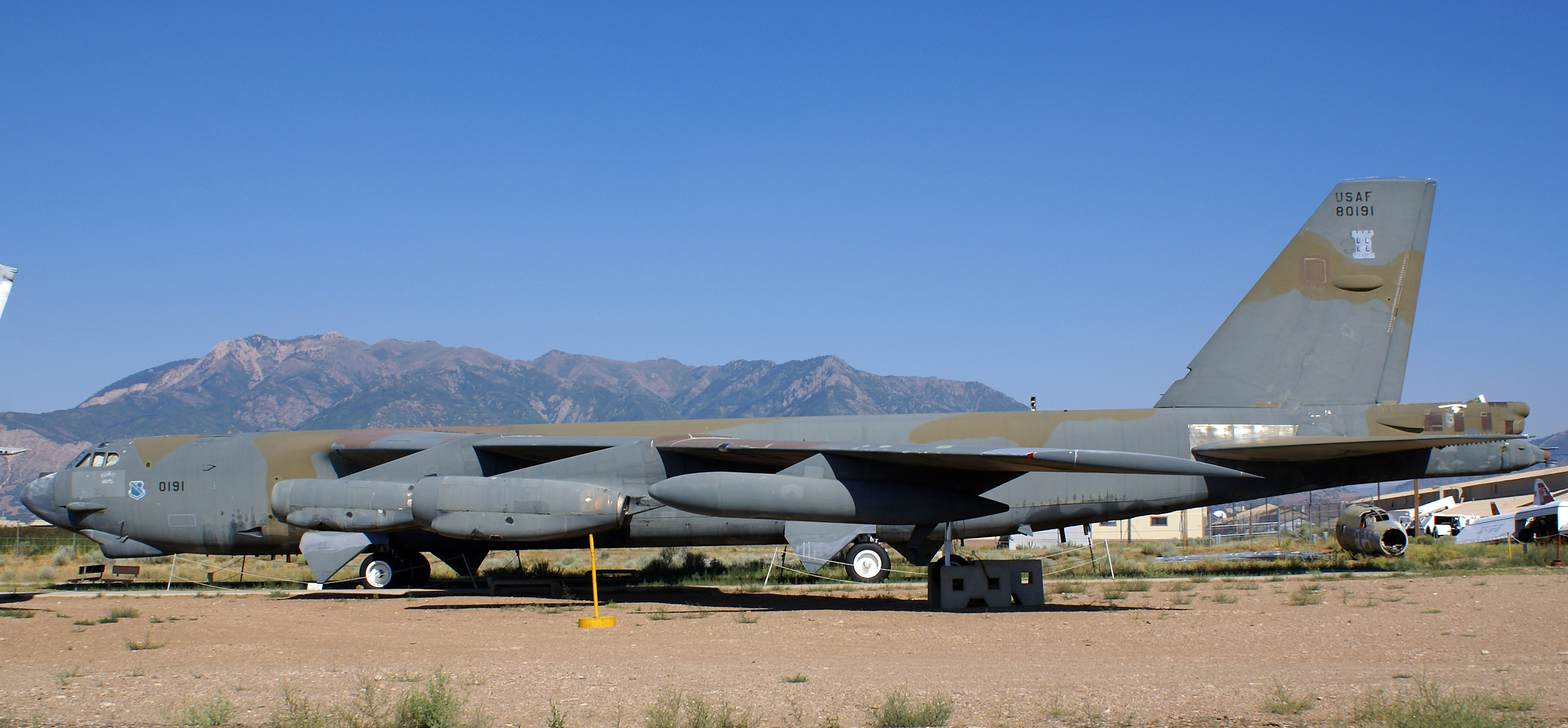
Boeing B-52G Stratofortress BUFF 58-0191

| Aircraft | Registration | Notes |
|---|---|---|
| Aeronca L-3B Grasshopper | USAAF 43-27206 | In storage |
| Avro Shackleton AEW.2 | RAF WL790 | On outdoor display |
| Beechcraft AT-7 Navigator | USAAF 42-2438 | On outdoor display |
| Beechcraft AT-11 Kansan | USAAF 41-9577 | On outdoor display |
| Beechcraft RC-12K Guardrail | USAF 85-0148 | In storage |
| Beechcraft SNB-2 Expeditor | USN 29646 | On outdoor display |
| Beechcraft T-34C Turbo Mentor | USMC 164172 | On outdoor display |
| Beechcraft TC-12B Huron | USN 161510 | In storage |
| Beechcraft U-8D Seminole | USAF 56-3701 | On outdoor display |
| Beechcraft UC-45J Expeditor | USN 39213 | On outdoor display |
| Beechcraft UC-45J Expeditor | USAr 29646 | On outdoor display |
| Bell P-39N Airacobra | USAAF 42-18814 | On indoor display |
| Bell P-63E Kingcobra | USAAF 43-11727 | On indoor display |
| Boeing B-17G Flying Fortress | USAAF 44-85828 | On indoor display, wearing the livery of 42-31892 "I'll Be Around". |
| Boeing B-29A Superfortress | USAAF 44-70016 | On indoor display. Sister ship of one of the two airworthy B-29s, Doc. |
| Boeing EB-47E Stratojet | USAF 53-2135 | On outdoor display |
| Boeing KB-50J Superfortress | USAF 49-0372 | On outdoor display |
| Boeing B-52D Stratofortress | USAF 55-0067 | On outdoor display |
| Boeing B-52G Stratofortress | USAF 58-0183 | On outdoor display |
| Boeing NB-52A Stratofortress | USAF 52-0003 | On outdoor display. The third and last A model built. The only A model remaining and the oldest B-52 in existence. Was one of 2 aircraft specifically modified and used to launch X-15s. |
| Boeing YC-14 | USAF 72-1873 | On outdoor display. The first of only 2 prototypes ever built. |
| Boeing C-97G Stratofreighter | USAF 52-2626 | On outdoor display |
| Boeing KC-97G Stratofreighter | USAF 53-0151 | On outdoor display |
| Boeing EC-135J Stratotanker | USAF 63-8057 | On outdoor display |
| Boeing VC-137B | USAF 58-6971 | On outdoor display |
| Boeing PT-17 Kadet | USAAF 41-8882 | On indoor display |
| Bristol Bolingbroke IVT | RCAF 10076 | On outdoor display |
| British Aerospace Harrier II GR.5 | RAF ZD353 | On outdoor display |
| British Aerospace Sea Harrier FA.2 | RN ZH810 | On outdoor display |
| Canadair Sabre Mk.5 | RCAF 23147 | On indoor display |
| Cessna O-2A Skymaster | USAF 68-6901 | On outdoor display |
| Cessna T-37B Tweet | USAF 57-2267 | On outdoor display |
| Cessna U-3A | USAF 58-2107 | On outdoor display |
| Cessna UC-78B Bobcat | USAAF 42-72157 | On indoor display |
| Columbia XJL-1 | USN 31400 | On indoor display. The last of 3 prototypes built. |
| Chance Vought F4U-4 Corsair | USN 97142 | On indoor display |
| Consolidated B-24J Liberator | USAAF 44-44175 | On indoor display |
| Consolidated PB4Y-2 Privateer | USN 59819 | On indoor display |
| Consolidated Model 2-5AMC Canso A | RCAF 9742 | On indoor display |
| Convair B-36J Peacemaker | USAF 52-2827 | On outdoor display. The last B-36 ever built and the last to be used by the USAF. |
| Convair B-58A Hustler | USAF 61-2080 | On outdoor display. The last B-58 ever built. |
| Convair C-131F Samaritan | USN 141017 | On outdoor display |
| Convair F-102A Delta Dagger | USAF 56-1393 | On outdoor display |
| Convair TF-102A Delta Dagger | USAF 54-1366 | On outdoor display |
| Convair F-106A Delta Dart | USAF 59-0003 | On outdoor display |
| Convair T-29B Flying Classroom | USAF 51-7906 | On outdoor display |
| Culver PQ-14B Cadet | USAAF 44-21819 | On indoor display |
| Curtiss AT-9A Fledgling | USAAF 42-56882 | In storage |
| Curtiss C-46D Commando | USAAF 44-77635 | On indoor display |
| Curtiss F6C-4 Hawk | USMC A-7404 | On indoor display |
| Curtiss O-52 Owl | USAAC 40-2746 | On indoor display |
| Curtiss P-40E-1 Warhawk | USAAF 41-25163 | On indoor display |
| Dassault Étendard IV | French Marine Nationale 21 MN | On outdoor display |
| Dassault HU-25A Guardian | USCG 2115 | In storage |
| Dassault HU-25A Guardian | USCG 2132 | On outdoor display |
| Dassault/Dornier Alpha Jet | West German Air Force 40+49 | On outdoor display |
| Dassault Mystère IVA | FrAF 12 YE | On outdoor display |
| de Havilland Australia DH.115 Vampire T.35 | RAAF A79-661 | On indoor display |
| Douglas A-20G Havoc | USAAF 43-9436 | On indoor display |
| Douglas A-26C Invader | USAAF 42-22494 | On indoor display |
| Douglas A-4B Skyhawk | USN 142928 | On outdoor display |
| Douglas B-18B Bolo | USAAF 38-593 | On indoor display |
| Douglas B-26K Invader | USAF 64-17653 | On outdoor display |
| Douglas C-117D Super Gooneybird | USN 50826 | On outdoor display |
| Douglas A-24B Banshee | USAAF 42-54654 | On indoor display |
| Douglas EA-1F Skyraider | USN 135018 | On outdoor display |
| Douglas C-9B Skytrain II | USN 159120 | On outdoor display |
| Douglas C-9B Skytrain II | USN 164607 | In storage |
| Douglas C-47 Skytrain | USAAF 41-7723 | On indoor display |
| Douglas C-54D Skymaster | USAAF 42-72488 | On outdoor display |
| Douglas VC-118A Liftmaster | USAF 53-3240 | On outdoor display. This aircraft served as the Air Force One for presidents John F. Kennedy and Lyndon B. Johnson. |
| Douglas C-124C Globemaster II | USAF 52-1004 | On outdoor display |
| Douglas C-133B Cargomaster | USAF 59-0527 | On outdoor display |
| Douglas EA-1F Skyraider | USN 136018 | On outdoor display |
| Douglas TF-10B Skyknight | USMC 124629 | On outdoor display |
| Douglas F-6A Skyray | USN 134748 | On outdoor display |
| Douglas WB-66D Destroyer | USAF 55-0395 | On outdoor display |
| Douglas YEA-3A Skywarrior | USN 130361 | On outdoor display |
| Douglas R4D-8 | USMC 50826 | On outdoor display |
| English Electric Lightning F.53 | RSAF 53-692 | On outdoor display. The only English Electric Lightning preserved in a museum in the USA. |
| Fairchild Republic A-10A Thunderbolt II | USAF 75-0298 | On indoor display |
| Fairchild C-82A Packet | USAAF 44-23006 | On outdoor display |
| Fairchild C-119C Flying Boxcar | USAF 49-0157 | On outdoor display |
| Fairchild C-123B Provider | USCG 55-4505 | On outdoor display |
| Fairchild C-123K Provider | USAF 54-0580 | On outdoor display |
| Fairchild PT-19A Cornell | USAAC 41-14675 | On indoor display |
| Fairchild PT-26 Cornell | RCAF 10530 | On indoor display without skin |
| Fairey Gannet AEW.3 | RN XL482 | On outdoor display |
| Focke-Wulf Fw 44J Stieglitz | FiAF SZ-19 | On indoor display |
| Fokker C-31A Troopship | USAr 85-1607 | On outdoor display. One of two C-31s purchased by the US and used for the US Army Golden Knights. |
| Folland Gnat T.1 | RAF XM694 | On outdoor display |
| General Dynamics F-111E Aardvark | USAF 68-0033 | On outdoor display |
| General Dynamics F-16A Fighting Falcon | USAF 80-0509 | In storage |
| General Dynamics F-16A Fighting Falcon | USAF 80-0527 | On outdoor display |
| General Dynamics F-16B Fighting Falcon | USAF 78-0077 | In storage |
| General Motors FM-2 Wildcat | USN 16161 | On indoor display |
| General Motors TBM-3E Avenger | USN 69472 | On indoor display |
| Grumman A-6E Intruder | USN 155713 | On outdoor display |
| Grumman C-2A(R) Greyhound | USN 162166 | |
| Grumman E-1B Tracer | USN 147227 | On outdoor display |
| Grumman EA-6B Prowler | USN 158542 | On outdoor display |
| Grumman F-11A Tiger | USN 141824 | On indoor display. Painted as it was in 1967, flying for the Blue Angels. |
| Grumman F-14A Tomcat | USN 160684 | On indoor display |
| Grumman F7F-3 Tigercat | USN 80410 | On outdoor display |
| Grumman F9F-4 Panther | USMC 125183 | On outdoor display |
| Grumman TF-9J Cougar | USN 147397 | On outdoor display |
| Grumman F9F-8B Cougar | USN 141121 | On outdoor display |
| Grumman F9F-8P Cougar | USMC 144426 | On indoor display |
| Grumman HU-16A Albatross | USAF 51-0022 | On outdoor display |
| Grumman J4F-2 Widgeon | USN 32976 | On indoor display |
| Grumman OV-1C Mohawk | USAr 61-2724 | On outdoor display |
| Grumman S-2F Tracker | USN 136468 | On outdoor display |
| Hawker Hunter Mk 58 | SwAF J-4035 | On outdoor display |
| Hawker Hurricane Mk.II | N/A (reconstruction) | On indoor display |
| Hawker Siddeley AV-8C Harrier | USN 159241 | On outdoor display |
| Hawker Siddeley Harrier GR.3 | RAF XV804 | On outdoor display |
| Hawker Siddeley TAV-8A Harrier | USMC 159382 | On outdoor display |
| Hawker Siddeley XV-6A Kestrel | USAF 64-18264 | On outdoor display |
| Hunting Percival Jet Provost T.3A | RAF XM464 | On outdoor display |
| Ilyushin IL-2M Shturmovik | Soviet Navy (s/n 5612) | On outdoor display |
| Ling-Temco-Vought A-7D Corsair II | USAF 70-0973 | On outdoor display |
| Ling-Temco-Vought A-7E Corsair II | USN 160713 | On outdoor display |
| Lockheed AP-2H Neptune | USN 135620 | On outdoor display |
| Lockheed P-2H Neptune | USN 150281 | In storage |
| Lockheed C-130A Hercules | USAF 57-0457 | On outdoor display |
| Lockheed C-130D Hercules | USAF 57-0493 | On outdoor display, equipped with skis for operations at the North Pole. |
| Lockheed EC-121T Warning Star | USAF 53-0554 | On outdoor display |
| Lockheed VC-121A Constellation "Columbine I" | USAF 48-0614 | On outdoor display. Used as the first personal aircraft of Dwight D. Eisenhower. |
| Lockheed F-94C Starfire | USAF 51-5623 | On outdoor display |
| Lockheed F-104D Starfighter | USAF 57-1323 | On outdoor display |
| Lockheed/Vega PV-2 Harpoon | USN 37257 | On outdoor display |
| Lockheed P-38G Lightning | USAAF 42-12847 | Undergoing restoration off-site |
| Lockheed P-80B Shooting Star | USAF 45-8612 | On outdoor display |
| Lockheed R5O-5 Lodestar | USN 12481 | Under restoration |
| Lockheed S-3B Viking | USN 160604 | On indoor display |
| Lockheed SR-71A Blackbird | USAF 61-17951 | On indoor display |
| Lockheed T-1A Seastar | USN 144200 | On outdoor display |
| Lockheed TV-2 Shooting Star | USN 136810 | On outdoor display |
| Lockheed T-33A Shooting Star | USAF 51-16992 | On outdoor display |
| Lockheed T-33A Shooting Star | USAF 53-6145 | On outdoor display |
| Lockheed VC-140B Jetstar | USAF 61-2489 | On outdoor display |
| Lockheed EP-3E Aries II | USN 156511 | |
| Lockheed VP-3A Orion | USN 150511 | On outdoor display |
| Lockheed P-3 Orion | USN 155299 | |
| Lockheed C-141B Starlifter | USAF 67-0013 | On outdoor display |
| Lockheed YO-3A Quietstar | USAr 69-18006 | On indoor display |
| Martin B-26B Marauder | USAAF 41-31856 | Undergoing restoration off-site |
| Martin B-57E Canberra | USAF 55-4274 | On outdoor display |
| Martin JRM Philippine Mars | USN, registration C-FLYK | |
| Martin/General Dynamics WB-57F Canberra | NASA N925NA | In storage |
| Martin PBM-5A Mariner | USN 122071 | On indoor display |
| McCulloch HUM-1 | USN 133817 | On indoor display |
| McDonnell Douglas F-15A Eagle | USAF 74-0118 | On outdoor display |
| McDonnell Douglas F/A-18A Hornet | USN 163093 | On outdoor display. Painted in Blue Angels colors. |
| McDonnell F2H-2P Banshee | USMC 125690 | On outdoor display |
| McDonnell F-3H-2 Demon | USN 145221 | On outdoor display |
| McDonnell FH-1 Phantom | USN 111768 | On indoor display |
| McDonnell F-101B Voodoo | USAF 57-0282 | On outdoor display |
| McDonnell RF-101C Voodoo | USAF 56-0214 | On outdoor display |
| McDonnell Douglas F-4C Phantom II | USAF 64-0673 | On outdoor display |
| McDonnell Douglas F-4E Phantom II | USAF 66-0329 | On indoor display. Painted in the Thunderbirds scheme. |
| McDonnell Douglas YF-4J Phantom II | USN 151497 | On outdoor display |
| Mikoyan-Gurevich MiG-17F Fresco-C | PoAF 1C-1905 | On outdoor display |
| Mikoyan-Gurevich MiG-17PF Fresco-D | PoAF 1D-0634 | On outdoor display |
| Mikoyan-Gurevich MiG-19PF (under Chinese licence : Shenyang J-6A) | s/n 0301 | On outdoor display |
| Messerschmitt Bf 109F-4 | Luftwaffe 13045 | |
| Mikoyan-Gurevich MiG-21PF Fishbed-D | s/n 2410 | On outdoor display |
| Mikoyan-Gurevich MiG-21PF Fishbed-D | Hungarian Air Force s/n 507 | |
| Mikoyan-Gurevich MiG-23MLD Flogger-K | s/n 23709 | On outdoor display |
| Mikoyan-Gurevich MiG-29 Fulcrum-A | s/n 29605 | On outdoor display |
| Nakajima KI-115 Tsurugi | s/n 1002 | On indoor display |
| Nakajima KI-43-IIB Hayabusa | s/n 6430 | On indoor display |
| North American B-25J Mitchell | USAAF 43-27712 | On indoor display |
| North American Yale | RCAF 3397 | On indoor display |
| North American Rockwell OV-10D Bronco | USMC 155499 | On outdoor display |
| North American CT-39A Sabreliner | USAF 62-4449 | On outdoor display |
| North American F-86E Sabre | USAF 50-0600 | On indoor display |
| North American F-86H Sabre | USAF 53-1525 | On outdoor display |
| North American F-86L Sabre | USAF 53-0965 | On outdoor display |
| North American FJ-4B Fury | USN 139531 | On outdoor display |
| North American P-51D Mustang | USAF 44-63272 (replica) | On indoor display |
| North American RA-5C Vigilante | USN 149289 | On outdoor display |
| North American F-100C Super Sabre | USAF 54-1823 | On outdoor display |
| North American F-107A | USAF 55-5118 | On indoor display. The first of only 3 F-107s built, one of two remaining. |
| North American T-28C Trojan | USN 140481 | On outdoor display |
| North American T-2C Buckeye | USN 157050 | On outdoor display |
| North American T-6G Texan | USAAF 49-2908 | On indoor display |
| Northrop F-5B Freedom Fighter | USAF 72-0441 | On outdoor display |
| Northrop F-5E Freedom Fighter | USMC 741564 | On outdoor display |
| Northrop F-89J Scorpion | USAF 53-2674 | On outdoor display |
| Northrop T-38A Talon | USAF 61-0854 | On outdoor display |
| Northrop YC-125A Raider | USAF 48-0636 | On outdoor display |
| Panavia Tornado IDS | MF 43+74 | On outdoor display |
| Piper U-11A Aztec | USN 149067 | On outdoor display |
| Republic P-47D Thunderbolt | USAAF 42-8130 | |
| Republic F-105D Thunderchief | USAF 61-0086 | On outdoor display |
| Republic F-105G Thunderchief | USAF 62-4427 | On outdoor display |
| Republic F-84C Thunderjet | USAF 47-1433 | On outdoor display |
| Republic F-84F Thunderstreak | USAF 52-6563 | On outdoor display |
| Republic RF-84F Thunderflash | USAF 51-1944 | On indoor display |
| Ryan PT-22 Recruit | USAr 41-15736 | On indoor display |
| Schweizer TG-3A | USAAF 42-52935 | On indoor display |
| SEPECAT Jaguar GR3A | RAF XZ396 | On outdoor display |
| Sopwith Camel F.1 | Royal Flying Corps | |
| Supermarine Spitfire FR.XIVe | RAF MT847 | |
| SOFIA | | On outdoor display |
| Stinson L-5B Sentinel | USAAF 44-16907 | On indoor display |
| Taylorcraft L-2M Grasshopper | USAAF 43-26110 | On indoor display |
| Taylorcraft TG-6 | USAAF 42-58662 | On indoor display |
| Vought DF-8F Crusader | USN 144427 | On outdoor display |
| Vultee BT-13A Valiant | USAAF 42-42353 | On outdoor display |
| WSK PZL-Mielec Lim-2 | WLOP 1B0822 | On outdoor display |

== Military helicopters ==
| Aircraft | Registration | Notes |
|---|---|---|
| Bell AH-1S Cobra | USAr 70-15985 | On indoor display |
| Bell AH-1W SuperCobra | USMC 160825 | On outdoor display |
| Bell HH-1N Iroquois | USMC 158554 | On outdoor display |
| Bell HTL-2 Sioux | USN 122952 | On indoor display |
| Bell HTL-7 Sioux | USN 145842 | On outdoor display |
| Bell UH-1F Iroquois | USAr 63-13141 | On display at the Titan Missile Museum |
| Bell UH-1H Iroquois | USAr 64-13895 | On outdoor display |
| Bell UH-1M Iroquois | USAr 65-09430 | On indoor display |
| Bell OH-58A Kiowa | USAr 69-16112 | On outdoor display |
| Bell OH-58D Kiowa Warrior | USAr 93-0976 | On indoor display |
| Bell OH-58D Kiowa Warrior | USAr 93-0015 | In storage |
| Boeing Vertol CH-46E Sea Knight | USMC 156469 | On outdoor display |
| Hughes OH-6A Cayuse | USAr 67-16381 | On indoor display |
| Hughes TH-55A Osage | USAr 67-75418 | On indoor display |
| Kaman HH-43F Huskie | USAF 62-4531 | On outdoor display |
| Kaman OH-43D Huskie | USMC 139974 | On outdoor display |
| Kaman SH-2F Seasprite | USN 150155 | On indoor display |
| Mil Mi-24D Hind-D | LSK B4002 | On outdoor display |
| Piasecki HUP-3 Retriever | USN 147595 | On outdoor display |
| Piasecki CH-21C Shawnee | USAF 56-2159 | On outdoor display |
| Sikorsky CH-37B Mojave | USAr 58-1005 | On outdoor display |
| Sikorsky CH-54A Tarhe | USAr 68-18437 | On outdoor display |
| Sikorsky H-5G Dragonfly | USAF 48-0548 | On outdoor display |
| Sikorsky HH-3F Pelican | USCG 1476 | On outdoor display |
| Sikorsky HH-52A Seaguard | USCG 1450 | On outdoor display |
| Sikorsky HO3S-1G Dragonfly | USCG 232 | On outdoor display |
| Sikorsky UH-19B Chickasaw | USAF 52-7537 | On outdoor display |
| Sikorsky HH-60G Pave Hawk | USAF 90-26227 | |
| Sikorsky MH-53M Pave Low | USAF 73-1649 | On outdoor display |
| Sikorsky SH-60B Seahawk | USN 162134 | In storage |
| Sikorsky UH-60MU Black Hawk | USAr 06-20017 | On indoor display |
| Sikorsky VH-34C Choctaw | USAr 57-1684 | On outdoor display |
| Westland Gazelle AH.1 | AAC XX384 | On indoor display |
| Westland Lynx HMA.8 | RN XZ722 | On outdoor display |
| Westland Lynx AH.7 | AAC XZ185 | On indoor display |

== Civilian aircraft ==
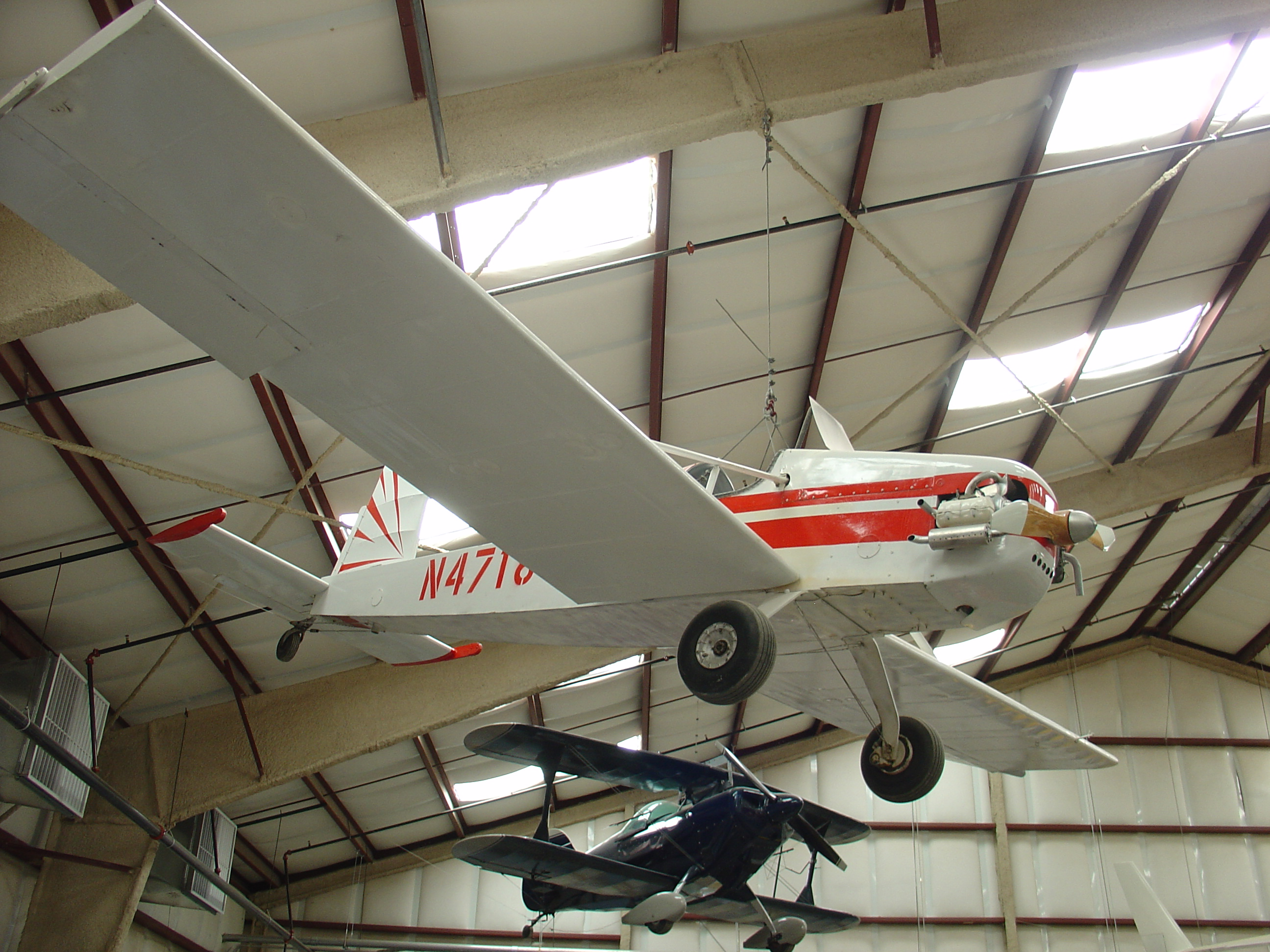
Evans VP-1 Volksplane

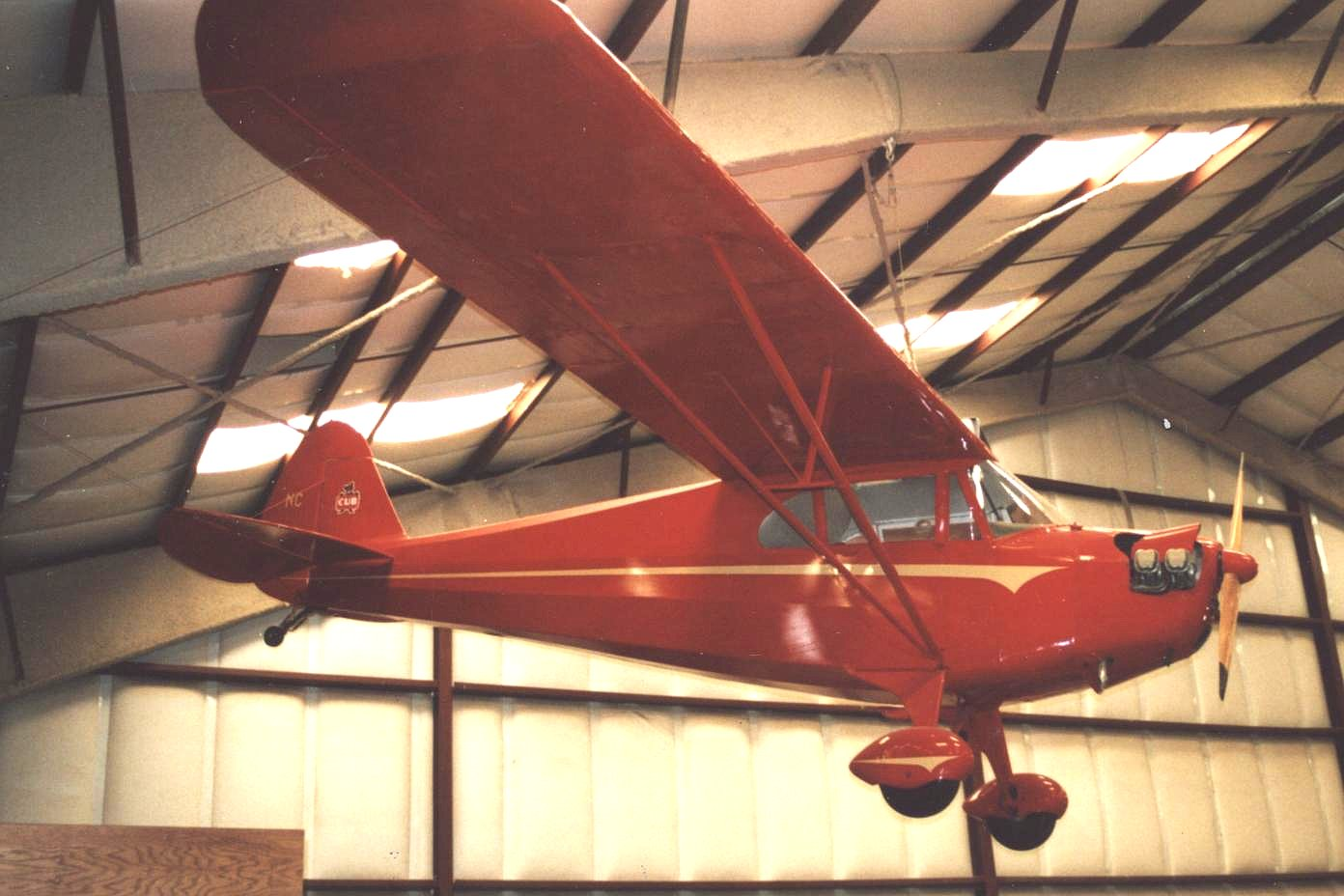
Piper J-4A Cub Coupe

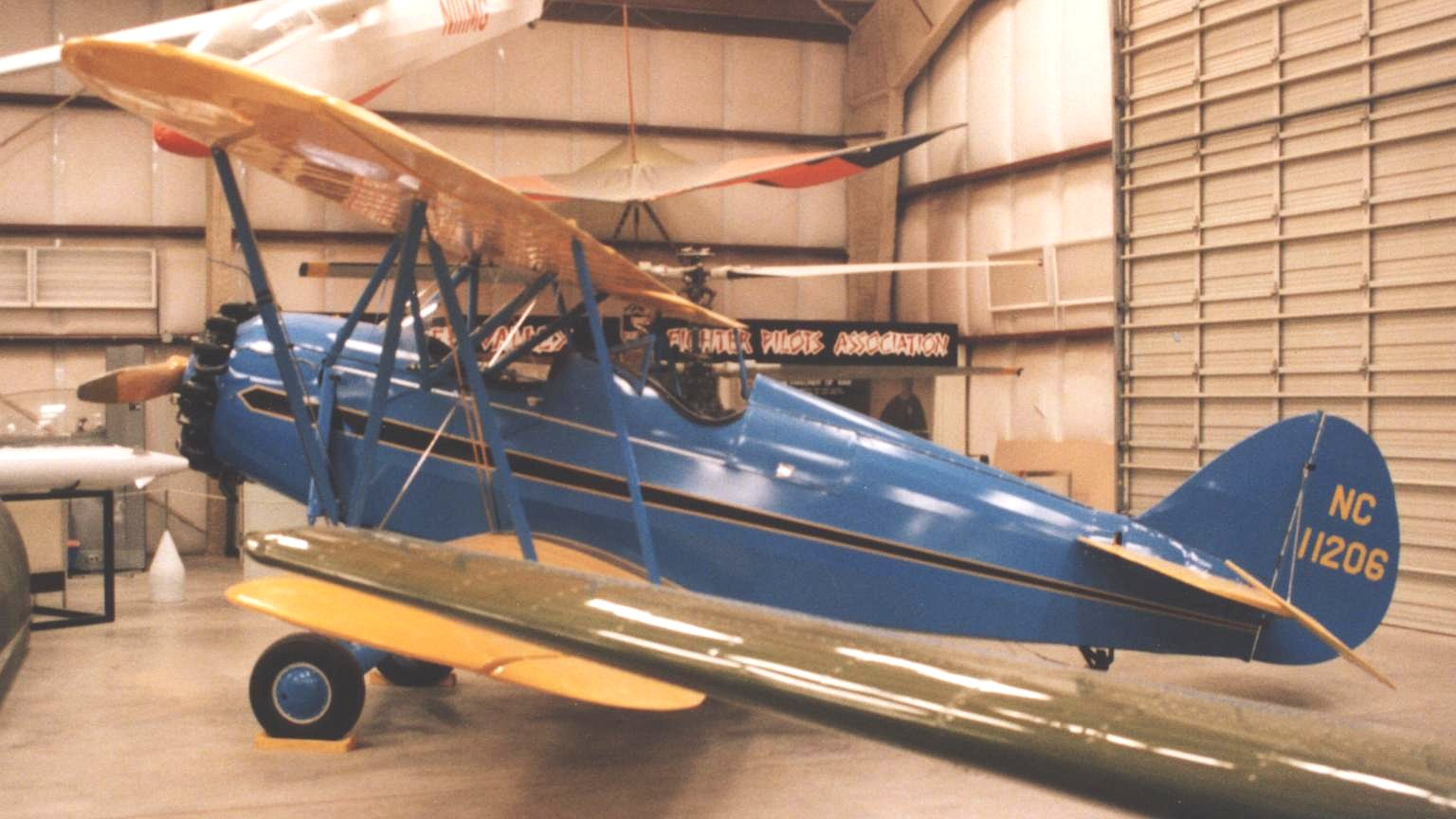
Waco RNF biplane

| Aircraft | Registration | Notes |
|---|---|---|
| Adam A500 | Civil N504AX | On outdoor display, number 4 out of 7 total aircraft built. |
| Aeritalia C-27A Spartan | Civil N23743 | On outdoor display |
| Aero Spacelines 377-SG Super Guppy | NASA N940NS | On outdoor display |
| Aerosport Quail | Civil N1387J | On indoor display |
| Agusta A109C Max | Civil N301CM | On outdoor display |
| Bede BD-4 | Civil N42EE | On outdoor display |
| Bede BD-5J Micro-Jet | Civil N505MR | On indoor display |
| Beechcraft 2000A Starship | Civil N39TU | On outdoor display |
| Beechcraft N35 Bonanza | Civil N9493Y | On outdoor display |
| Beechcraft S18D | Civil N55681 | On indoor display |
| Bellanca 14-13-2 Cruisair Senior | Civil XB-FOU | On indoor display |
| Boeing 727-100 | Civil N7004U | In storage. 5th Boeing 727 built and first to be delivered to a customer. It flew the first ever 727 commercial flight in 1964. Painted in United Airlines tulip livery, awaiting restoration. |
| Boeing 737-300 | Civil N759BA | On outdoor display. Painted in China Southern Airlines colors. |
| Boeing 747-100 | Civil N747GE | On outdoor display. Painted in GE colors. Engine testbed for GE, was the oldest active 747 at the time of retirement. |
| Boeing 777-200 | Civil B-HNL | On outdoor display. Painted in Cathay Pacific colors. First Boeing 777 prototype. |
| Boeing 787-8 | Civil N787EX | On outdoor display. Donated by Boeing, painted in All Nippon Airways colors. Second Boeing 787 Dreamliner prototype. |
| Boeing KC-135A Stratotanker | NASA N931NA | On outdoor display |
| Bowers Fly Baby | Civil N49992 | On indoor display |
| Bushby Midget Mustang | Civil N53RM | On outdoor display |
| Cassutt Formula One Pylon Racer | — | On indoor display |
| Cessna 120 | Civil NC4191N | On outdoor display |
| Cessna 150L | Civil N18588 | On outdoor display |
| Cessna 172M Skyhawk | Civil N12774 | On outdoor display |
| Cessna 310A | Civil N182Z | On outdoor display |
| Douglas A-4C Skyhawk | Civil N401FS | On outdoor display at main entrance |
| Douglas B-23 Dragon | Civil N61Y | On indoor display |
| Douglas DC-7B | Civil N51701 | On outdoor display |
| ERCO 415C Ercoupe | Civil N2942H | On outdoor display |
| Evans VP-1 Volksplane | Civil N47188 | On indoor display |
| Fairchild C-119C Flying Boxcar | Civil N13743 | On outdoor display |
| Flaglor Scooter | Civil N6WM | On indoor display |
| Fleet Model 2 | Civil N605M | On indoor display |
| Fouga CM.170-1 Magister | Civil N492FM | On outdoor display |
| GAF N22S Nomad | Civil N6328 | On outdoor display |
| Grumman AF-2S Guardian | Civil N9994Z | On outdoor display |
| Grumman Gulfstream I | NASA N4NA | Under restoration |
| Grumman Gulfstream II | NASA N948NA | On outdoor display. |
| Helton Aircraft Lark 95 | Civil N1512H | On indoor display |
| Hiller UH-12C | Civil N7725C | On indoor display |
| Learjet 23 | Civil N88B | On indoor display |
| Lockheed P2V-7 Neptune | Civil N14448 | On outdoor display |
| Lockheed L-049 Constellation | Civil N90831 | On outdoor display in Trans World Airlines colors |
| Lockheed Model 10A Electra | Civil NC14260 | On indoor display |
| Lockheed Model 18 Lodestar | Civil N9200H | In storage |
| Martin 4-0-4 Skyliner | Civil N462M | On outdoor display |
| McCulloch Super J-2 | Civil N4309G | On indoor display |
| McDonnell Douglas DC-10-10 Orbis Flying Eye Hospital | Civil N220AU | On outdoor display. The 2nd DC-10 ever built and the oldest in existence. The original Orbis Flying Eye Hospital. |
| Mikoyan-Gurevich MiG-15bis Fagot | Civil N822JM | On indoor display |
| Mikoyan-Gurevich MiG-15UTI Fagot | Civil N38BM | On outdoor display |
| Mitchell Wing B-10 | Civil N4232A | On indoor display |
| Morane-Saulnier MS-500 Criquet | Civil N42FS | On indoor display |
| Naval Aircraft Factory N3N-3 Yellow Peril | Civil N45084 | On indoor display |
| Pentecost Hoppicopter | — | On indoor display |
| Pereira Osprey 2 | Civil N17EH | On indoor display |
| Piper J-4A Cub Coupe | Civil NC22783 | On indoor display |
| Pitts S-1C Special | Civil N6119 | On indoor display |
| Rutan Model 61 Long-EZ | Civil N82ST | On indoor display |
| Rutan Quickie | Civil N80EB | On indoor display |
| Ryan/Temco D-16A Twin Navion | Civil N5128K | On outdoor display |
| Scheibe Zugvogel IIIB | Civil N111MG | On indoor display |
| Sikorsky S-43 Baby Clipper | Civil NC16934 | On outdoor display |
| Snow S-2A | Civil N3695F | On outdoor display |
| Starr Bumble Bee | Civil N83WS | On indoor display |
| Sud Aviation SE-210 Caravelle | Civil N1001U | On outdoor display |
| Taylorcraft BC-12D | Civil N43584 | On indoor display |
| Ryan-Temco D-16 Twin Navion | Civil N5128K | On outdoor display |
| TL-Ultralight Stream | Civil N34RJ | On indoor display |
| Vickers Viscount 744 | Civil CF-TGI | On outdoor display |
| WACO RNF | Civil NC11206 | On indoor display |
| WACO UPF-7 | Civil NC30135 | On indoor display |
| WACO ZKS-6 | Civil NC16523 | On indoor display |

== Lighter-than-air craft ==
| Type | Identity | Notes |
|---|---|---|
| Avian Falcon II Skydancer | Civil N4369Z | In storage |

== Drones, missiles and unmanned aircraft ==
| Type | Identity | Notes |
|---|---|---|
| Culver PQ-14 Cadet | USAAF 44-21819 | On indoor display |
| Douglas AIR-2 Genie | — | |
| Fieseler Fi 103 V-1 flying bomb | LW 121536 | On indoor display |
| General Dynamics BGM-109G Gryphon | — | On outdoor display |
| Globe KD6G-2 Firefly | — | On outdoor display |
| Gyrodyne QH-50C DASH | — | On indoor display |
| General Atomics MQ-1B Predator | USAF | |
| Teledyne Ryan AQM-34L Firebee | USAF 69-0432 | On outdoor display |
| Teledyne Ryan YQM-98A R-Tern | USAF 72-1872 | On outdoor display |

== Partial aircraft ==
| Aircraft | Identity | Notes |
|---|---|---|
| Boeing B-52D Stratofortress tail | USAF 56-0659 | In storage |
| Brewster Bermuda | — | Offsite for restoration |
| Budd RB-1 Conestoga | Civil XB-DUZ | On outdoor display |
| Canadian Vickers OA-10A Canso rear fuselage | Civil N322FA | In storage |
| Curtiss P-40K Warhawk | USAAF 42-45984 | In storage |
| Curtiss P-40N Warhawk | USAAF 42-104961 | In storage |
| Curtiss-Wright AT-9A Jeep | USAAF 42-56882 | In storage |
| Fairchild PT-26 Cornell | RCAF 10530 | On indoor display |
| Waco CG-4A nose section | — | On indoor display |
