= HERC JOV-3 =

The HERC JOV-3 was a two-seat tandem helicopter originally designed by Drago Jovanovich at the Helicopter Engineering Research Corporation (HERC). The helicopter first flew in 1948.

When McCulloch Aircraft Corporation purchased HERC they improved the design for prospective military use and it became the McCulloch MC-4.
