= Aero Resources =

Aero Resources was established at Gardena, California in 1970 to manufacture Drago Jovanovich's J-2 autogyro. It offered an improved version of the aircraft as the Super J-2 (modifying the last examples off the McCulloch production line to this standard), but was unable to obtain enough orders to make production viable.
