= Jovair =

American helicopter manufacturer

- Industry: Aircraft
- Founded: 1960; 66 years ago in El Segundo, California, United States
- Founders: Drago Jovanovich; Frank Kozloski
- Defunct: 1969-1970
- Fate: Taken over by McCulloch Aircraft Corporation
- Products: Helicopters

D K Jovanovich and Frank Kozloski founded the Helicopter Engineering Research Corporation in Philadelphia, Pennsylvania, in 1946, the predecessor of Jovair.

In 1949 Jovanovich and Kozloski transferred to the McCulloch Aircraft Corporation, the aircraft division of the McCulloch Motors Corporation, along with its two most promising designs, the J-2 and the JOV-3. In 1960 D K Jovanovich formed Jovair Corporation in El Segundo, California.
