= McCulloch MC-4 =

American military helicopter tested in the 1950s

MC-4
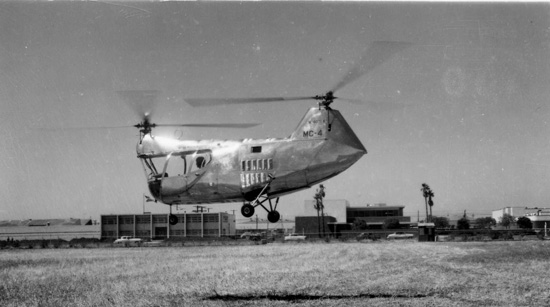

General information
- Type: Light helicopter
- Manufacturer: McCulloch Aircraft Corporation
- Designer: Drago Jovanovich
- Primary users: United States Army United States Navy

History
- First flight: March 1951
- Developed from: HERC JOV-3

The McCulloch Model MC-4 is an American tandem-rotor helicopter and was the first helicopter developed by McCulloch Aircraft Corporation, a division of McCulloch Motors Corporation. It was evaluated by the United States Army as the YH-30 and the United States Navy as the XHUM-1.

== Design and development ==
The MC-4 was a larger version of the earlier HERC JOV-3 tandem-rotor helicopter and was developed by the McCulloch Aircraft Corporation. The JOV-3 was developed by Jovanovich when he headed the Helicopter Engineering and Research Corporation. The JOV-3 first flew in 1948. In 1949, Jovanovich moved to the McCulloch Motors Corporation, where an enlarged helicopter, the MC-4, first flew in March 1951. It was followed by a similar MC-4C and three evaluation helicopters for the United States Army (as the YH-30). The MC-4C was slightly larger than the MC-4. When the MC-4C was certified in 1953, it was the first tandem-rotor helicopter to be certified in the United States for commercial use. Three examples were evaluated by the United States Army as the YH-30, but the Army's evaluation showed the helicopter to be underpowered.

The YH-30 had a steel tube framework with a light metal skin, A single 200 hp Franklin piston engine was horizontally mounted amidships and powered two intermeshing tandem rotors. It had a fixed-wheel tricycle landing gear with a castering nosewheel.

No civil or military orders were received and Jovanovich formed his own company, the Jovair Corporation, where he modified the MC-4C as a prototype for a four-seat private helicopter designated the Sedan 4E. The Sedan 4E was powered by a 210 hp Franklin 6A-335 engine. A version with a turbocharged engine was designed as the Sedan 4ES and a more basic Sedan 4A for agricultural use. By 1965 a small number of Sedan helicopters were built. In the early 1970s, McCulloch regained the rights to the helicopter designs.

== Variants ==
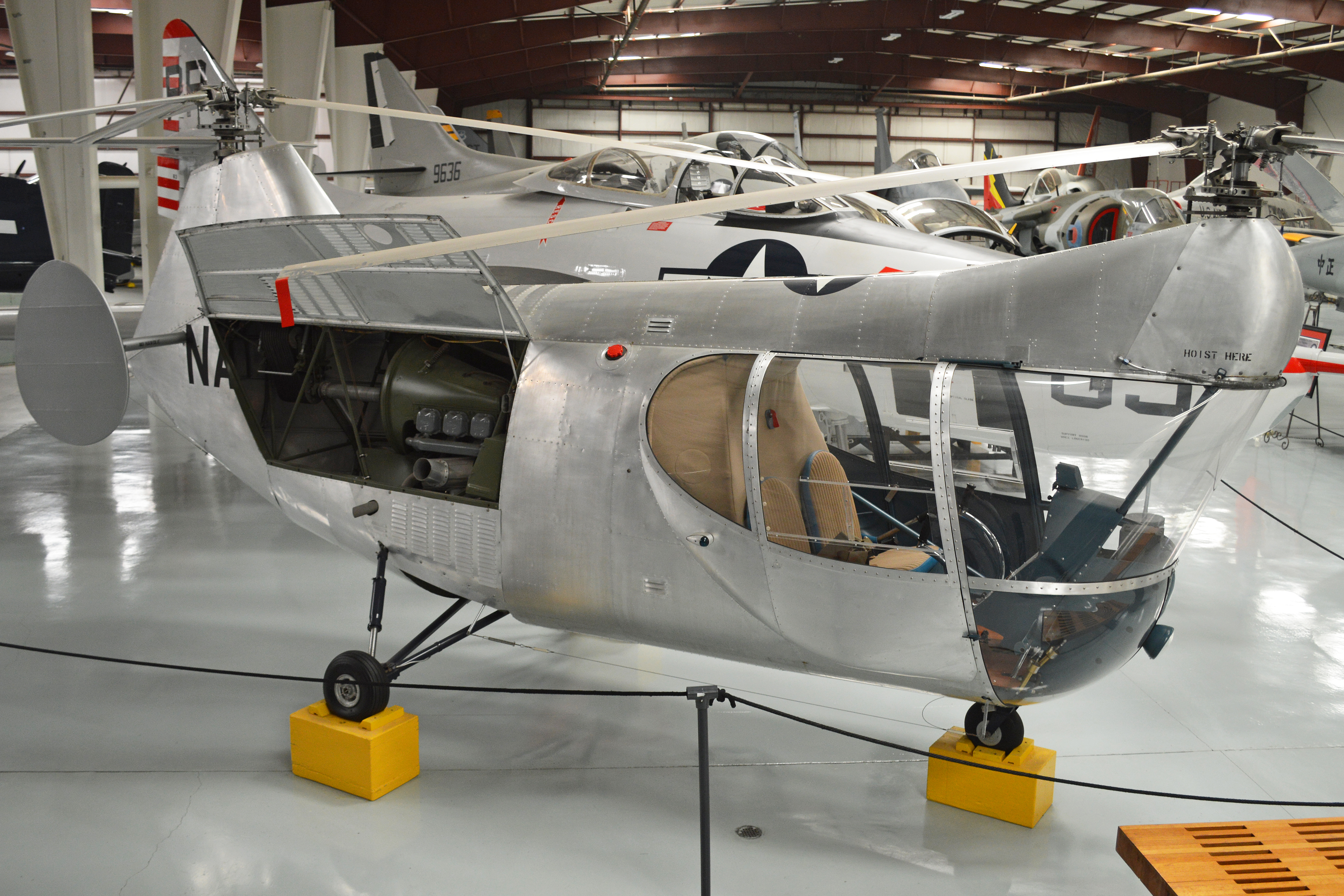
McCulloch XHUM-1 at the Yanks Air Museum, Chino, California

McCulloch MC-4
Prototype with a 165 hp Franklin engine, two built, one for evaluation by the United States Navy.
McCulloch MC-4A
Variant for evaluation by the United States Navy as the XHUM-1, two built.
McCulloch MC-4C
Prototype with a 200 hp Franklin engine, one built and an additional three for United States Army evaluation as the YH-30.
Jovair Sedan 4E
Production civil four-seat version powered by a 210 hp Franklin 6A-335 engine.
Jovair Sedan 4ES
Sedan with a turbocharged 225 hp Franklin engine.
Jovair Sedan 4A
Simplified agricultural version.

=== Military designations ===
YH-30
Military version of the MC-4C, three built.
CHUM-1
Two MC-4As for evaluation by the United States Navy, later redesignated HUM-1.

== Operators ==
United States

- United States Army
- United States Navy

== Surviving aircraft ==
- 133817 – HUM-1 on static display at the Pima Air and Space Museum in Tucson, Arizona.
- 133818 – HUM-1 on static display at the Yanks Air Museum in Chino, California.
- 52-5837 – YH-30 on static display at the United States Army Aviation Museum at Fort Novosel, Alabama.

== Specifications (YH-30) ==
General characteristics

- Crew: two
- Length: 32 ft 0 in (9.75 m)
- Height: 9 ft 2 in (2.79 m)
- Empty weight: 1,200 lb (544 kg)
- Gross weight: 2,000 lb (907 kg)
- Powerplant: 1 × Franklin O-335-6 (6A4-200-C6) piston , 200 hp (147.1 kW)
- Main rotor diameter: 2 × 22 ft 0 in (6.71 m)

Performance

- Maximum speed: 105 mph (168.98 km/h, 91 kn)
- Range: 200 mi (321.86 km, 170 nmi)
