= Drago Jovanovich =

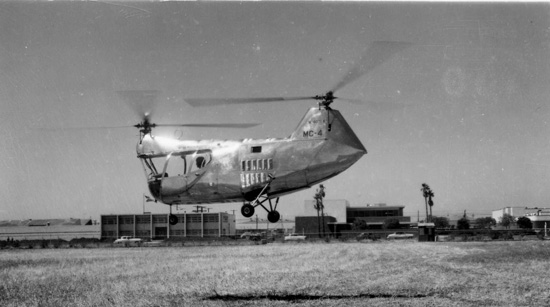
McCulloch MC-4, based on the JOV-3, designed by Jovanovich

Dragoljub Kosta Jovanovich (January 24, 1916 – November 12, 1983), also known under his pen name D. K. or "Gish" Jovanovich, was a Serbian-American helicopter designer, inventor, and pioneer in autogyro technology. Born in the Kingdom of Yugoslavia, he subsequently moved to the United States, living first in Philadelphia and later in southern California.

== Piasecki and HERC ==
Jovanovich and Frank Kozloski founded the Helicopter Engineering Research Corporation (HERC) in Philadelphia, Pennsylvania in 1946. HERC was the predecessor of Jovair. Jovanovich and Kozloski previously worked for Piasecki Helicopter Corporation where Jovanovich's patented tandem rotary design was used on the Piasecki PV-3.

The first helicopter they designed was the HERC JOV-3. This was first flown in 1948. They used the Boulevard Airport (formerly William Penn Airport) as their base.

== McCulloch ==
In 1949 Jovanovich and Kozloski transferred to the McCulloch Aircraft Corporation, the new helicopter and aircraft division of McCulloch Motors Corporation. The design principles of the JOV-3 were incorporated into the McCulloch MC-4, which first flew in March 1951. In 1952, the MC-4C, a modified MC-4, was acquired by the US Army in 1952 for testing, but was deemed underpowered and none were further ordered.

== Hughes ==
In 1955 Jovanovich designed a rotor for Howard Hughes' Hughes 269. This was followed by hub blades for the three-blade light helicopter, the 1958 Del Mar DH-1 Whirlymite series, and the hub for the Hughes 500.

== Jovair ==
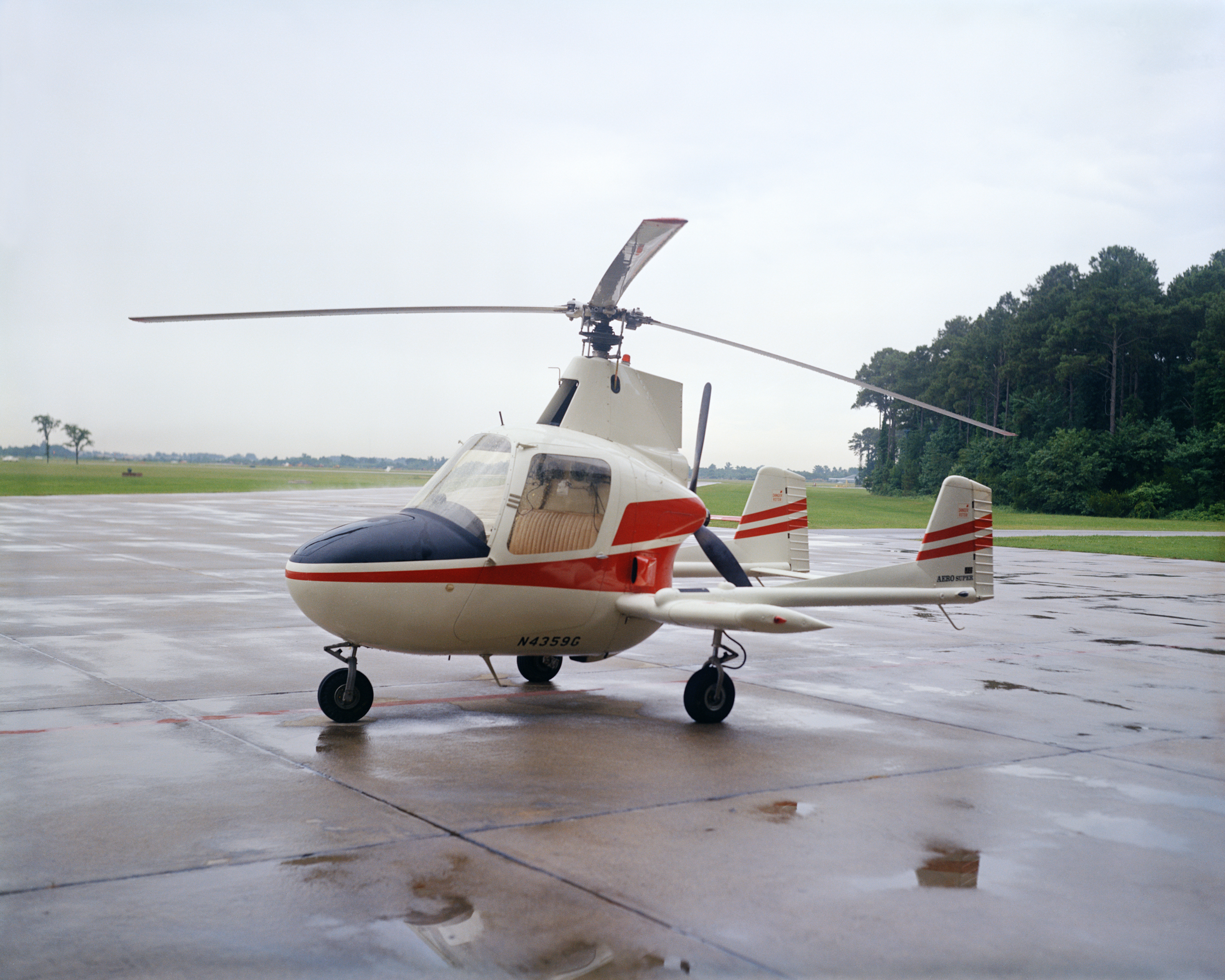
McCulloch J-2

In 1960 Jovanovich formed Jovair Corporation to continue development of the MC-4. A new version the Jovair Sedan 4E called the Jovairin was type approved by the FAA in March 1963. Bill Lear tried to spark interest in its production without success.

In 1968 McCulloch Corp fully acquired Jovair, renaming it McCulloch Aircraft Corp. The company moved its facilities from Culver City to El Segundo at this time with Jovanonich as its Vice Chairman.

With McCulloch Corporation funding, Jovanovich designed and developed an autogyro, the McCulloch J-2, that could take off from a residential driveway. Jovanovich had patented a similar concept in 1954. Development was slow because Jovair lacked staff and resources yet the first prototype flew in 1962. Flying Magazine's review of the J-2 was unflattering to both Jovanovich and the J-2. A retraction of the comments about Jovanovich was published three months later.

== Aircraft designed by Jovanovich ==
- The tandem rotary on the Piasecki PV-3
- HERC JOV-3
- McCulloch MC-4
- The rotor blades on the Hughes 269
- Jovair Sedan 4E
- McCulloch J-2

== Patents ==
- Helicopter #USD168794 S (Publication Date: 1953)
- Means for connecting rotor blades to rotor bodies #US2672941 A (Publication Date: 1954)
- Damping means for blades of aircraft sustaining rotors #US 2696271 A (Publication Date: 1954)
- Rotor blade for helicopters #US 2712356 A (Publication Date: 1955)
- Pitch control means for aircraft sustaining rotors #US 2753004 A(Publication Date: 1956)
- Movement limiting means for blades of aircraft sustaining rotors #US 2742098 A (Publication Date: 1956)
- Helicopter Control Mechanism #US2856788 A (Publication Date: 1958)
- Convertiplane #US 2852207 A (Publication Date: 1958)
- Helicopter rotor blade #US2941603 A (Publication Date: 1960)
- Blade-to-hub connector for thrust producing rotor #US 2949967 A (Publication Date: 1960)
- Helicopter #US D191929 S (Publication Date: 1961)

== See also ==
- McCulloch Aircraft Corporation
- Robert P. McCulloch
