= McCulloch Aircraft Corporation =

The McCulloch Aircraft Corporation was the aircraft division of the McCulloch Motors Corporation. The McCulloch Motors Corps. was founded in 1943 by Robert McCulloch. The company was moved from Wisconsin to California.

== History ==
=== Aircraft Engine ===
One of McCulloch Aircraft Corporation's engine designs was the McCulloch O-100-1 (model 4318A). This engine was a single-ignition, 2-stroke, 72 hp target drone engine.

This small McCulloch 0-100-1 engine was used in drone aircraft like the Radioplane Model RP-15 (OQ-6) and the MQM 33 (Q-19).

=== Helicopter ===
The McCulloch Aircraft Corporation acquired Helicopter Engineering Research Corp in 1951. It manufactured two innovative helicopter designs – the tandem-rotor MC-4 and the J-2 autogyro.

Rights to the twin-rotor MC-4 was sold back to the original designer, Drago Jovanovich, in 1957. Rights to the J-2 autogyro were sold to Aero Resources (Gardena, California) in 1974.
