= Frank Kozloski =

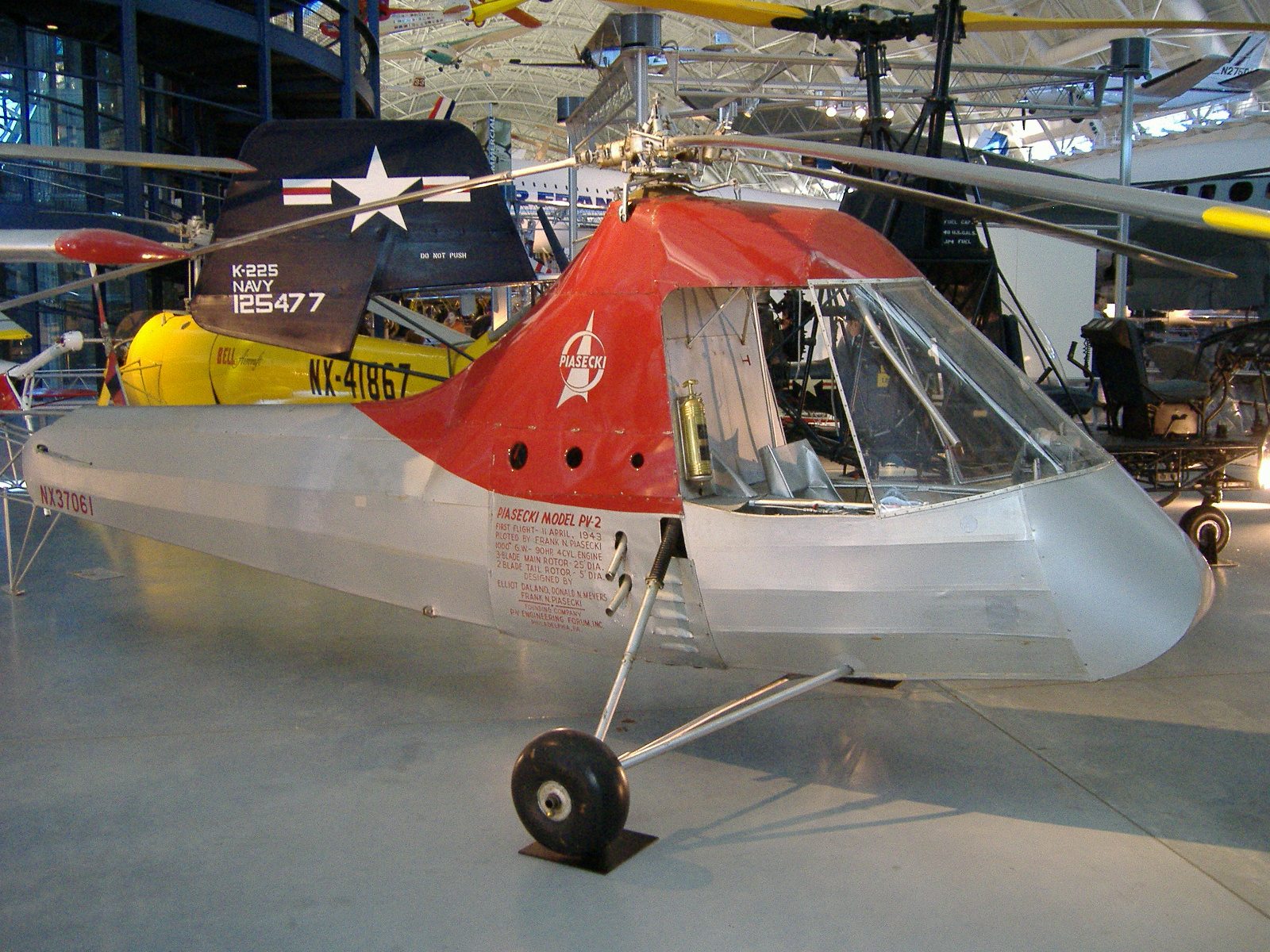
Piasecki PV-2

Frank Kozloski (1916–2003) was an aeronautical engineer who worked on early tandem rotor helicopters and was one of the founders of Piasecki Helicopter's.

Kozloski was born in Edwardsville in 1916. His parents were Anthony and Stella Twardowska Kozloski. After graduating from Penn State University, Kozloski worked for Westinghouse in Sharon for a year. He left Westinghouse to study aeronautical engineering at NYU. On graduating in 1940, Kozloski joined Frank Piasecki, F.M.Vinsie, Walt Schwartz, Don Myers, and Elliott Daland who formed their own company where they designed the Piasecki PV-2. He met Drago Jovanovich while working at Piasecki's.

On 26 September 1944 he married Bertha S. Anisko and later worked for Kellett Autogiro Corporation in Philadelphia until being drafted into the Navy. After the war he joined with Jovanovich in forming HERC and moved with him to McCulloch's for a time. In the mid-1950s Kozloski opened his own machine shop in California and worked for a number of years for the Hughes Aircraft Corporation. He was involved through Hughes with development of the F-102 and XF-103 fighter planes.

In the late 1950s Kozloski returned to Pennsylvania and worked for Boeing as a technical representative for the Bomarc Missile Program. He moved again in 1964 to Alabama to work on the Apollo 11 project and then to Delaware to work on the Sea Knight helicopter. Kozloski retired from Boeing in 1981 due to ill health and moved to Maine. He died on 15 December 2003.
