= McCulloch J-2 =

1962 autogyro

J-2
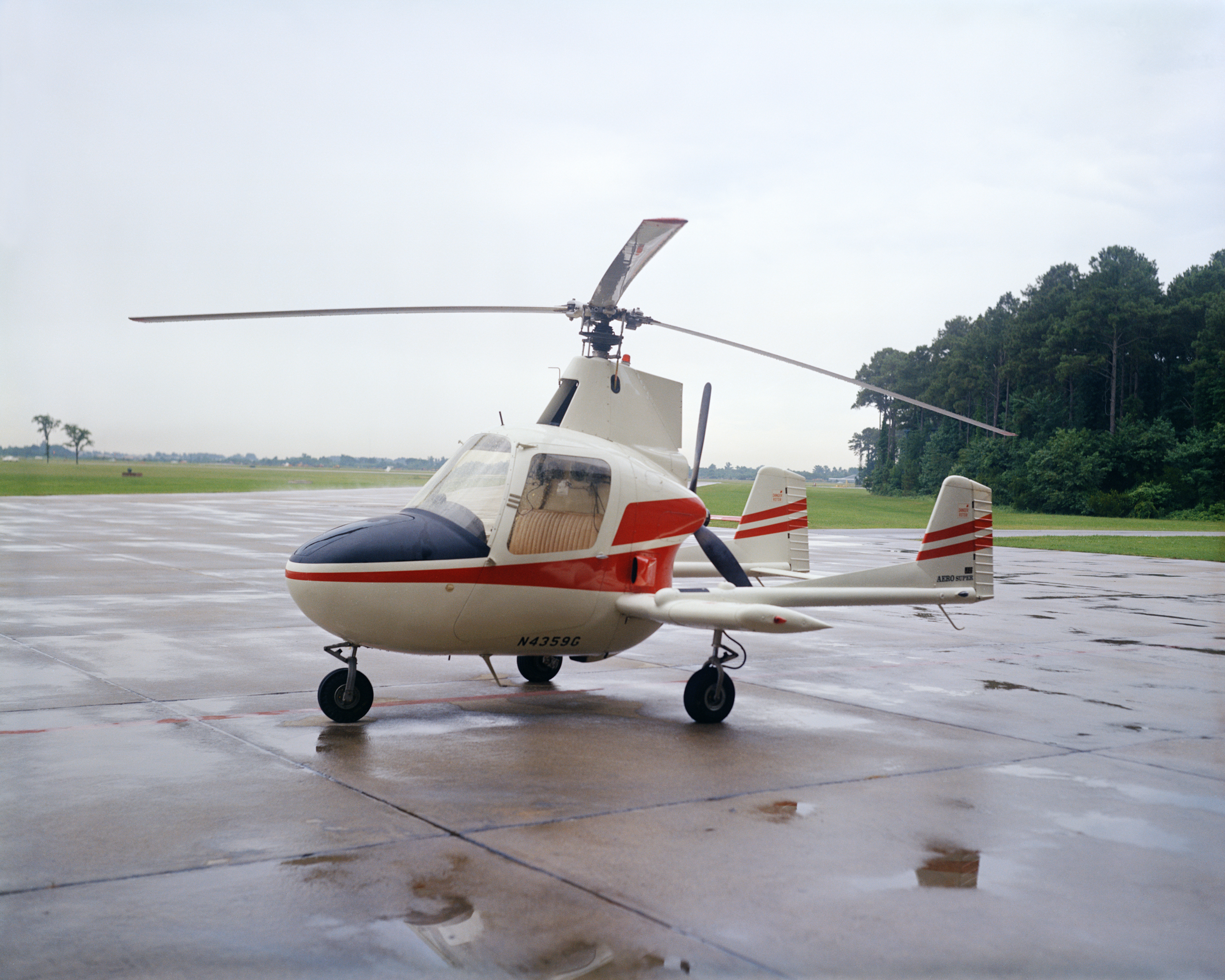

General information
- Type: Civil utility autogyro
- Manufacturer: McCulloch, Aero Resources
- Designer: Drago Jovanovich
- Primary user: private pilot owners
- Number built: at least 83

History
- First flight: June 1962

The McCulloch J-2 was a small, two-seat autogyro with an enclosed cabin, one of only three designs of this type of aircraft to receive a type certificate in the United States. It was built by McCulloch Aircraft Corporation.

== Design and development ==
It was designed by Drago Jovanovich and first flew in June 1962. McCulloch acquired the design in 1969 and put it into production, building 83 aircraft over the next three years. They were reported to sell for US$15,900.

The design featured a belt clutch and a transmission which could be engaged to spin the rotor blades to high speed before take-off to produce short takeoff runs. A lever on the rear cockpit wall would select the drive position for the transmission. A single "spin-up lever" on the cockpit left side would then be pressed downward, operating as a collective pitch control to put the blades into flat pitch while simultaneously tensioning the belt clutch. The rotor could be spun to over 500 rpm before takeoff, well above the normal flight range (typically 425 rpm). Release of the spin-up lever would disengage both the clutch and the transmission, while placing the blades into flight pitch. After a very brief takeoff run (typically 25 to 200 feet, depending upon load and winds) adequate flight airspeed would be attained, while the rotor speed decayed to the normal flight range. The rotor was not engine-driven in flight. A strong spring resisted accidental depressing of the spin-up lever while airborne. Dual controls were provided for all functions except the spin-up lever, which was accessible only from the left seat. The aircraft enjoyed nimble handling with light control forces, but suffered from a shallow climb gradient.

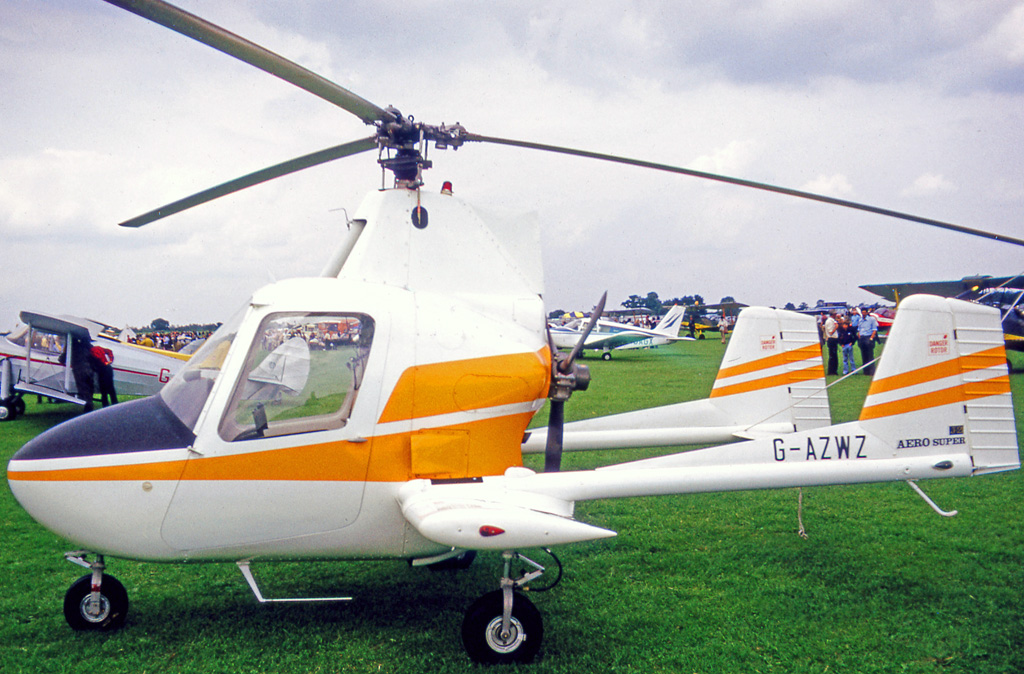
McCulloch J-2 registered in the United Kingdom between 1972 and 1975

Early versions were equipped with a two-bladed wooden Sensenich propeller. A later "Super J-2" variant employed a three-bladed Hartzell controllable-pitch propeller, accompanied by an increase in allowable gross weight. Baggage of up to 95 pounds, to the extent permitted by gross weight considerations, could be carried in a large bay under the seat. Fuel was carried in tanks in the stub wings. A total of 24 U.S. gallons could be carried, 12 on each side, but only 20 were usable through normal flight attitudes. At a typical fuel burn rate of about eight gallons per hour and economy cruise at about 85 mph, with a need for a safety reserve, this limited the aircraft's range.

The rotor system (hub and blades) is very similar to that found on the early versions of the Hughes 269 / Schweizer 300 series helicopters. The primary difference is in the twist of the blades (or lack thereof), optimized for autorotation in the case of the J-2.

Most examples of the J-2 were sold to pilot owners in the United States but at least one example was exported to the United Kingdom.

In 1974, the rights were bought by Aero Resources, who planned to return the Super J-2 to production, but could not find a market for the aircraft and no more were built.

== Variants ==
Jovanovich Jov-2
The initial prototype as designed by Drago Jovanovich.
McCulloch J-2 and Super J-2
Production versions built by McCulloch from 1971 to 1974. 83 built.
Aero Resources Super J-2
Further planned production by Aero resources, powered by a 180 hp (134 kW) Lycoming O-360-A2D. None built.

== Aircraft on display ==
- J-2 - Naval Air Station Wildwood Aviation Museum, Rio Grande, New Jersey
- J-2 – American Helicopter Museum & Education Center, West Chester, Pennsylvania
- J-2 - Pima Air & Space Museum, Tucson, Arizona

== Specifications (Super J-2) ==
Data from

General characteristics

- Crew: one pilot
- Capacity: one passenger
- Length: 15 ft 9 in (4.8 m)
- Empty weight: 1,109 lb (503 kg)
- Max takeoff weight: 1,598 lb (725 kg)
- Powerplant: 1 × Lycoming O-360-A2D 4-cyl. horizontally opposed, 180 hp (130 kW)
- Main rotor diameter: 25 ft 11 in (7.9 m)
- Main rotor area: 530 sq ft (49 m^{2})

Performance

- Maximum speed: 106 mph (171 km/h, 92 kn)
- Range: 200 mi (320 km, 170 nmi)
- Service ceiling: 8,010 ft (2,440 m)
- Rate of climb: 690 ft/min (3.5 m/s)

== See also ==
- Robert P. McCulloch
- Twin-boom aircraft
