= Kaman K-MAX =

American medium-lift helicopter

K-1200 K-MAX
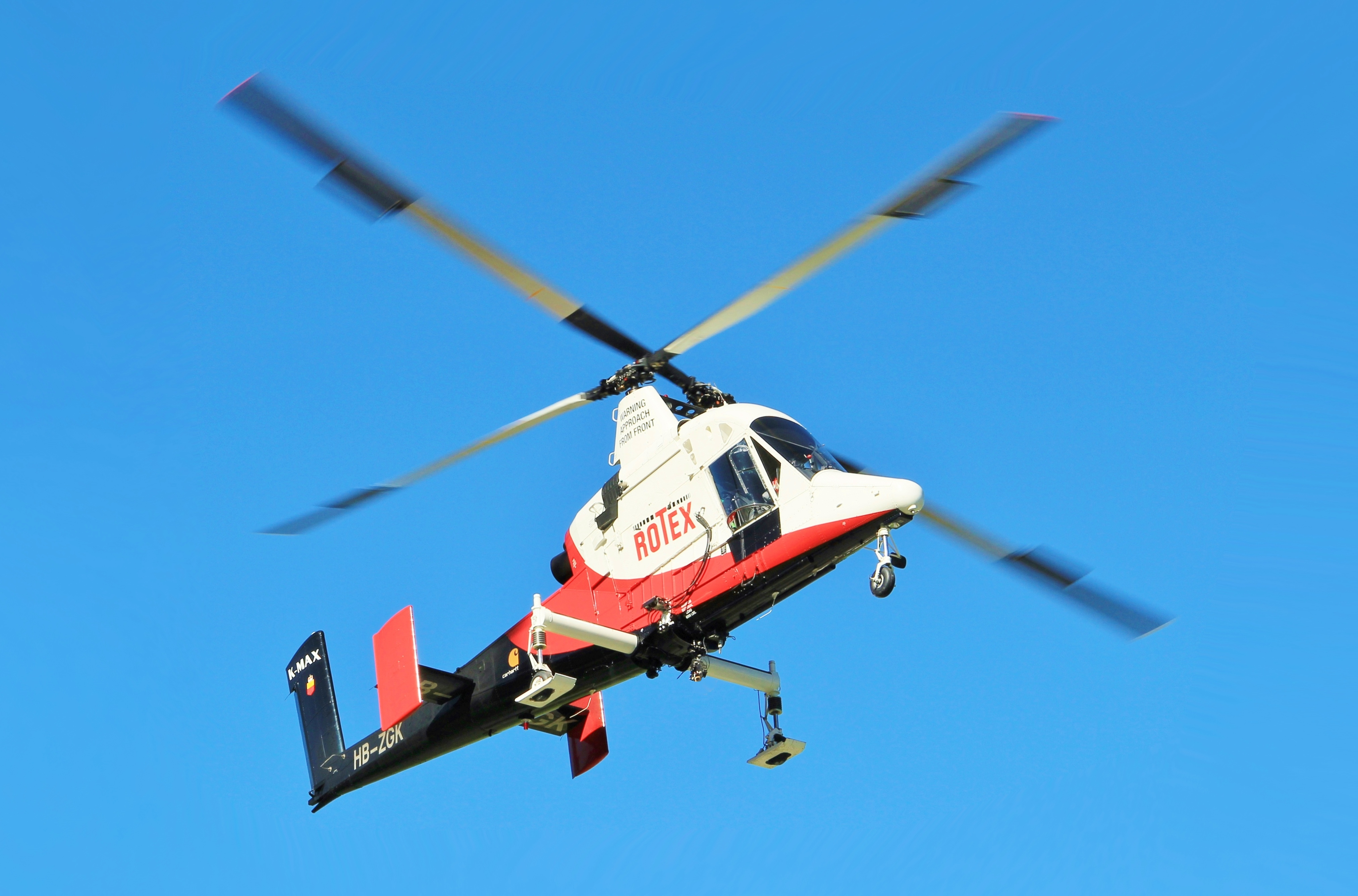
- A Kaman K-1200 from Rotex aviation

General information
- Type: Medium lift helicopter
- Manufacturer: Kaman Aircraft
- Status: Production ended, in service

History
- Manufactured: 1991–2003, 2015–2023
- First flight: December 23, 1991

The Kaman K-MAX (company designation K-1200) is a helicopter with intermeshing rotors (synchropter) designed and produced by the American manufacturer Kaman Aircraft. It first flew in 1991 and was produced for military and civilian operators.

Developed in the 1980s and 1990s, the K-MAX builds on the work of the German aeronautical engineer Anton Flettner. It was designed for external cargo load operations; later configurations supported aerial firefighting and casualty evacuation. It can lift more than 6,000 pounds (2,700 kg), which is greater than the helicopter's empty weight and almost twice as much as the competing Bell 205 despite sharing a similar engine.

Kaman sought to develop the K-MAX into an unmanned aerial vehicle with optional remote control. During the early 2010s, the United States Marine Corps deployed a pair of unmanned K-MAXes to support ground forces during the war in Afghanistan, but ultimately lost a larger contract to an unmanned version of the MD Helicopters MH-6 Little Bird.

Kaman produced 38 K-MAXes from 1991 to 2003, then shut the line as sales declined. In 2015, Kaman announced that it would restart production to fill a new commercial order for 10 aircraft. The first new K-MAX was flown in May 2017 and delivered two months later to a customer based in China. Kaman flight-tested an optionally piloted configuration, the K-Max Titan, in 2021. In January 2023, Kaman said it would once again close the production line due to low demand.

== Development ==
=== Background ===
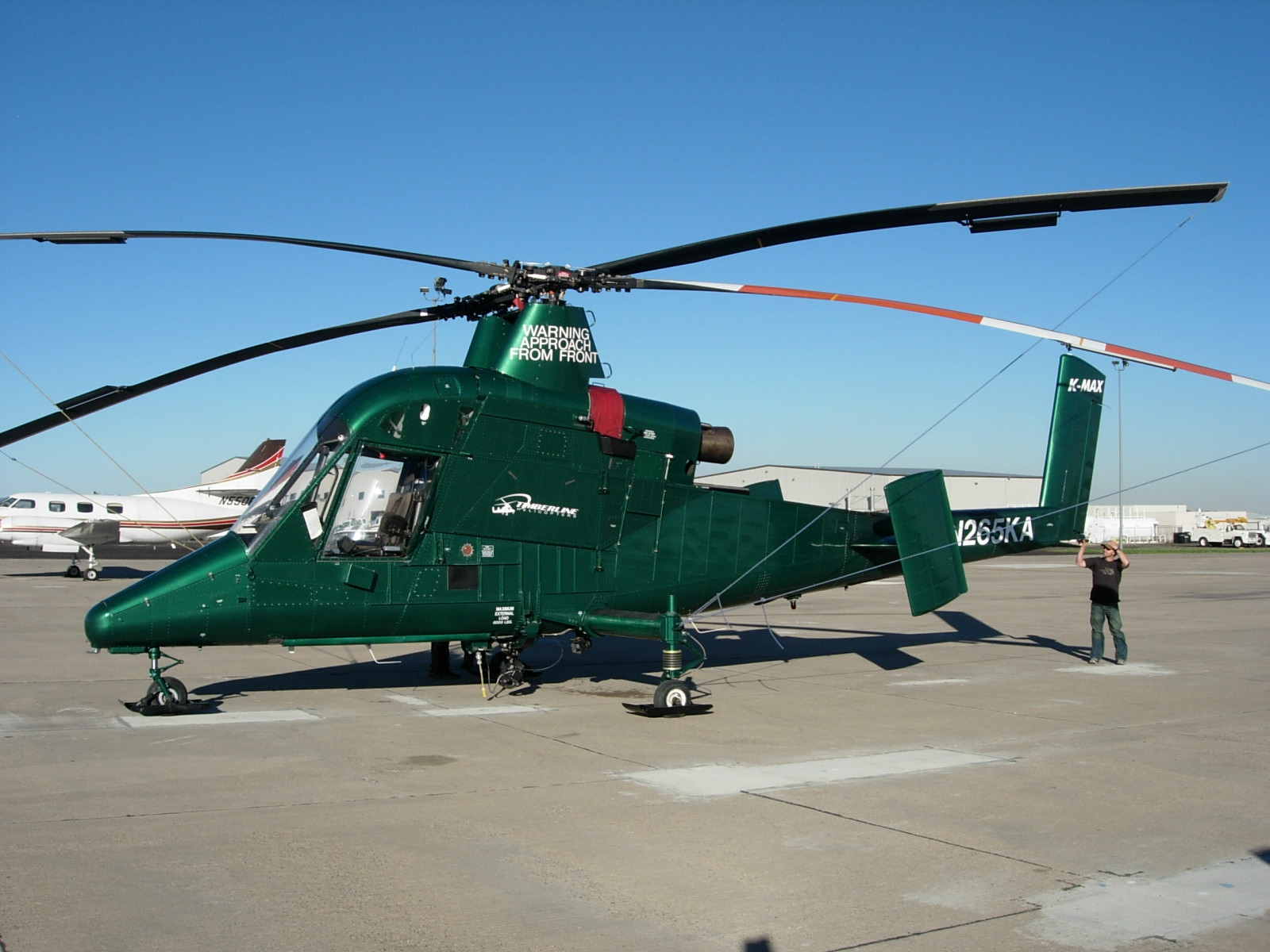
K-1200 operated by Timberline Helicopters

In 1947, the German aeronautical engineer Anton Flettner was brought to the United States as part of Operation Paperclip. He was the developer of the two earlier synchropter designs from Germany during the Second World War: the Flettner Fl 265 which pioneered the synchropter layout, and the slightly later Flettner Fl 282 Kolibri ("Hummingbird"), intended for eventual production. Both designs used the principle of counter-rotating side-by-side intermeshing rotors, as the means to solve the problem of torque compensation, normally countered in single–rotor helicopters by a tail rotor, fenestron, NOTAR, or vented blower exhaust, which can use 10-25% of the engine power. Flettner remained in the United States and became the chief designer of the Kaman company. In this capacity, he designed numerous new helicopters that used the Flettner double rotor.

=== Design ===
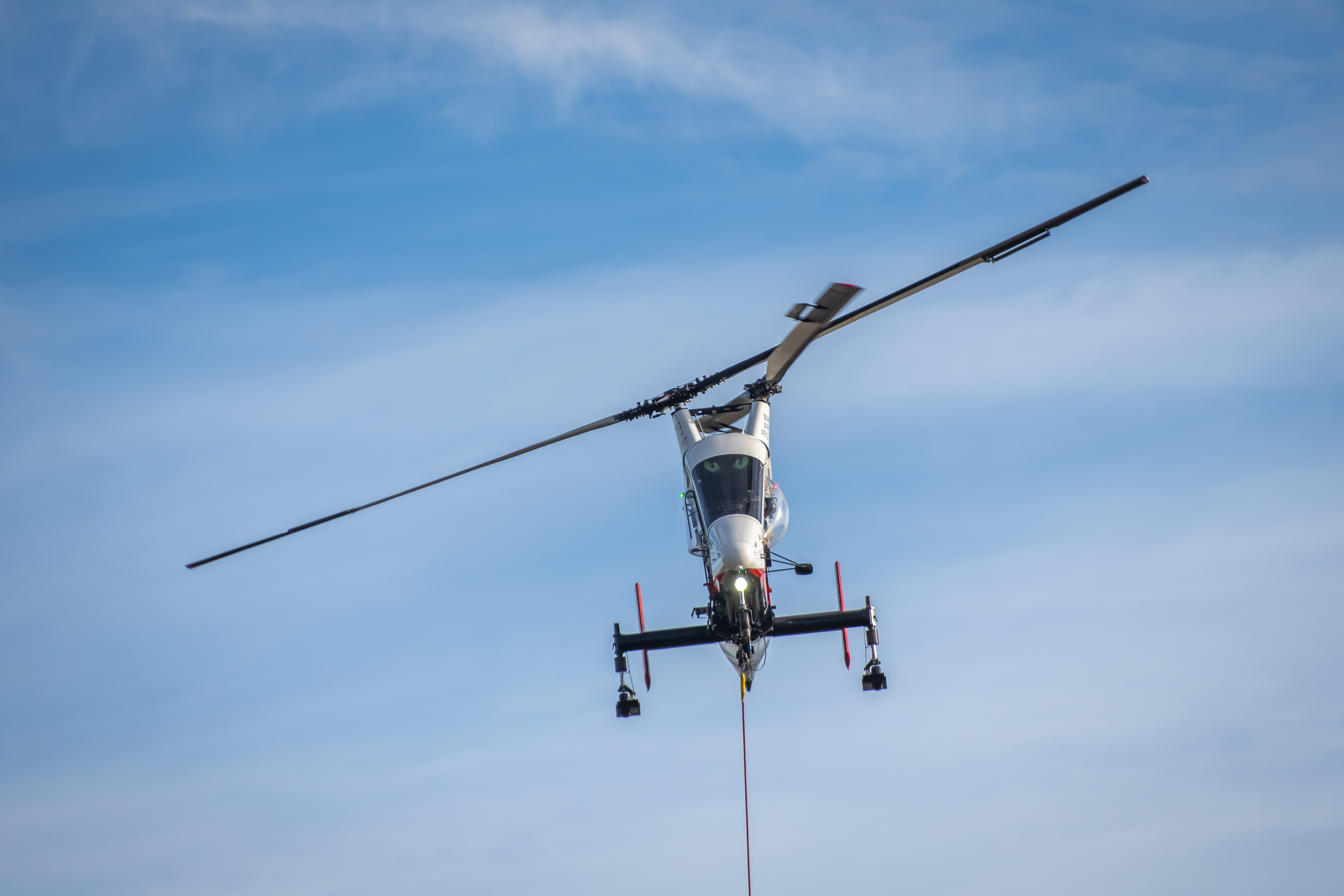
Front silhouette

The K-MAX series is the latest in a long line of Kaman synchropters, the most famous of which is the HH-43 Huskie. The first turbine-powered helicopter was also a Kaman synchropter. HH-43 customers requested a similar helicopter from Kaman, optimized for lifting.

Accordingly, the K-MAX relies on two primary advantages of synchropters over conventional helicopters: The increased efficiency compared to conventional rotor-lift technology; and the synchropter's natural tendency to hover. This increases stability, especially for precision work in placing suspended loads. At the same time, the synchropter is more responsive to pilot control inputs, making it possible to easily swing a load, or to scatter seed, chemicals, or water over a larger area. The K-MAX was flight certified in 1994.

The K-1200 K-MAX "aerial truck" is the world's first helicopter specifically designed, tested, and certified for repetitive external lift operations and vertical reference flight (Kaman received IFR Certification in 1999), an important feature for external load work. Other rotorcraft used for these tasks are adapted from general-purpose helicopters, or those intended to primarily carry passengers or internal cargo.

The K-MAX can lift 6,000 lb (2,700 kg), almost twice as much as the Bell 205 using a different version of the same engine. The aircraft's narrow, wedge-shaped profile and bulging side windows give the pilot a good view of the load looking down&out from either side of the aircraft, with the most important flight instruments duplicated on the outside of the aircraft, near the pilot's line of sight straight down to the load. The cargo hook slides freely on a curved bearing under the helicopter's center of gravity, improving cargo handling during flight. The seat is FAA crashworthiness approved.

The transmission has a reduction ratio of 24.3:1 in three stages, and is designed for unlimited life. The two rotor masts are set at an angle of 25 degrees apart to allow the rotors to intermesh with each other. The masts transfer rotation from the transmission to the rotor blades. The rotor blades (which turn in opposite directions at 250—270 rpm) are built with a Sitka spruce wooden spar and Nomex honeycomb trailing edge sections. Wood was chosen for its damage tolerance and fatigue resistance; and to take advantage of field experience and qualification data amassed from a similar spar on the HH-43 Huskie helicopter, built for the U.S. Air Force in the 1950s and 1960s. The pilot controls the blade pitch via steel tubes running inside the mast and rotor blades to move servo flaps that pitch the blades, reducing required force and avoiding the added weight, cost and maintenance of hydraulic controls. Due to the rotor principle, the helicopter is operated slightly differently compared to regular helicopters, and pilots go through a flight training program in an HH-43 Huskie.

=== First termination of production ===
Between 1991 and 2003, thirty-eight K-MAX helicopters had been completed by Kaman. In 2003, amid a wider downturn that impacted the whole aviation industry, it was decided to shutter the production line. However, this move did not lead to development work being halted; instead, such initiatives were continued for an extended period and new partners on the programme were sought.

=== Unmanned version ===
As early as 1998, Kaman was working on the development of an unmanned version of the K-MAX. During March 2007, Kaman and Lockheed Martin (Team K-MAX) signed a Strategic Relationship Agreement (SRA) to jointly pursue U.S. DoD opportunities. An unmanned mostly autonomously flying, optionally remote controlled and optionally piloted vehicle (OPV) version, the K-MAX Unmanned Multi-Mission Helicopter was developed for hazardous missions. It can be used in combat to deliver supplies to the battlefield, as well as civilian situations involving chemical, biological, or radiological hazards. A prototype of this was shown in 2008 for potential military heavy-lift resupply use, and again in 2010. In December 2010, the Naval Air Systems Command awarded a $46 million contract to Kaman for two aircraft, and, in 2011, they completed a five-day Quick Reaction Assessment. At the 2013 Paris Air Show, Kaman promoted the unmanned K-MAX to foreign buyers, the company claimed that several countries had expressed interest in the system.

During the mid-2010s, the unmanned K-MAX competed with the Boeing H-6U Little Bird to fulfil the Marine Corps unmanned lift/ISR requirement. In April 2014, Marines at Quantico announced they successfully landed an unmanned K-MAX, as well as a Little Bird, autonomously using a hand held mini-tablet. The helicopters were equipped with Autonomous Aerial Cargo/Utility System (AACUS) technology, which combines advanced algorithms with LIDAR and electro-optical/infrared sensors to enable a user to select a point to land the helicopter at an unprepared landing site. The Office of Naval Research selected Aurora Flight Sciences and the Unmanned Little Bird to complete development of the prototype AACUS system, however, Lockheed stated that it would continue to promote the K-MAX and develop autonomous cargo delivery systems.

=== Second production run ===
During February 2014, Kaman stated that it was looking into resuming K-MAX production, having recently received over 20 inquiries for firefighting, logging and industry transport requirements as well as requests for the military unmanned version. Ten firm orders convinced Kaman to put the design back into production again. By 2014, the K-MAX fleet had cumulatively flown 300,000 hours and cost $1,200 per flight hour to operate.

At Heli-Expo 2015 in Orlando, Kaman reported it was continuing to progress towards reopening the production line. Following the receipt of multiple customer deposits, the assembly line was restarted in January 2017. On 12 May 2017, Kaman test flew the first K-MAX to be produced since 2003; on 13 July 2017, it was delivered to Kaman's Chinese sales agent Lectern Aviation, which delivered it onwards to Guangdong Juxiang General Aviation, Guangdong Province for firefighting with the second to be delivered the following week.

To facilitate appropriate scheduling and preparations, Kaman needed to decide in 2017 whether to extend production beyond the first 10 K-MAX rotorcraft. During June 2017, Kaman made the decision to produce a further 10 aircraft, extending the production run into at least 2019. In mid 2017, the company publicly commented that it expected to produce one K-MAX every eight weeks.

Building on a three-year autonomy experiment in Afghanistan with the US Marine Corps, Kaman was at one point pursuing development of the K-Max Titan, an optionally piloted variant intended for commercial customers to fly into dangerous zones like wildfires or natural disasters, and for long operation with no pilot rest; it was claimed to be suitable for operating for up to 100 flight hours before requiring any mandatory inspections. Following FAA certification, the system was to be fitted on new and used helicopters outside the factory. In April 2021, the Titan technology took its first flight.

On 18 January 2023, Kaman announced it will once again be ending the K-MAX production line later that year; its stated reasons for the closure were “low demand and variation in annual deliveries, coupled with low profitability and large working capital inventory requirements.” The line is scheduled to close in the first quarter of FY 2023 after completing a 60-platform production run. Kaman noted that it would take a $54 million of non-cash charges on account of write-downs of existing inventory and aircraft alike.

== Operational history ==
Slow motion footage of a Kaman K-MAX in flight

During 2008, a single K-MAX was used for demolition work, having been outfitted with a 1,400 kg (3,000 lb) wrecking ball as a slung load.

In December 2011, an unmanned K-MAX was reported to be at work in Afghanistan. On 17 December 2011, the U. S. Marine Corps conducted the first unmanned aerial system cargo delivery in a combat zone using the unmanned K-MAX, moving about 3,500 pounds (1,600 kg) of food and supplies to troops at Combat Outpost Payne. A third unmanned K-MAX in the U.S. was tested in 2012 to deliver cargo to a small homing beacon to achieve three-meter precision. By February 2013, the K-MAX had delivered two million pounds (910 metric tons) of cargo across 600 unmanned missions, during which in excess of 700 flight hours had been recorded.

On July 31, 2012, Lockheed announced a second service extension for the K-MAX in Afghanistan to support the Marine Corps; on 18 March 2013, the Marine Corps announced the indefinite extension of its use of the unmanned K-MAX helicopters, stating that it would keep the two aircraft in use "until otherwise directed". At the time of the announcement, they had flown over 1,000 missions and hauled over three million pounds (1,400 metric tons) of supplies; assessments for their use after the deployment were also being studied. The unmanned K-MAX has won awards from Popular Science and Aviation Week & Space Technology, and was nominated for the 2012 Collier Trophy.

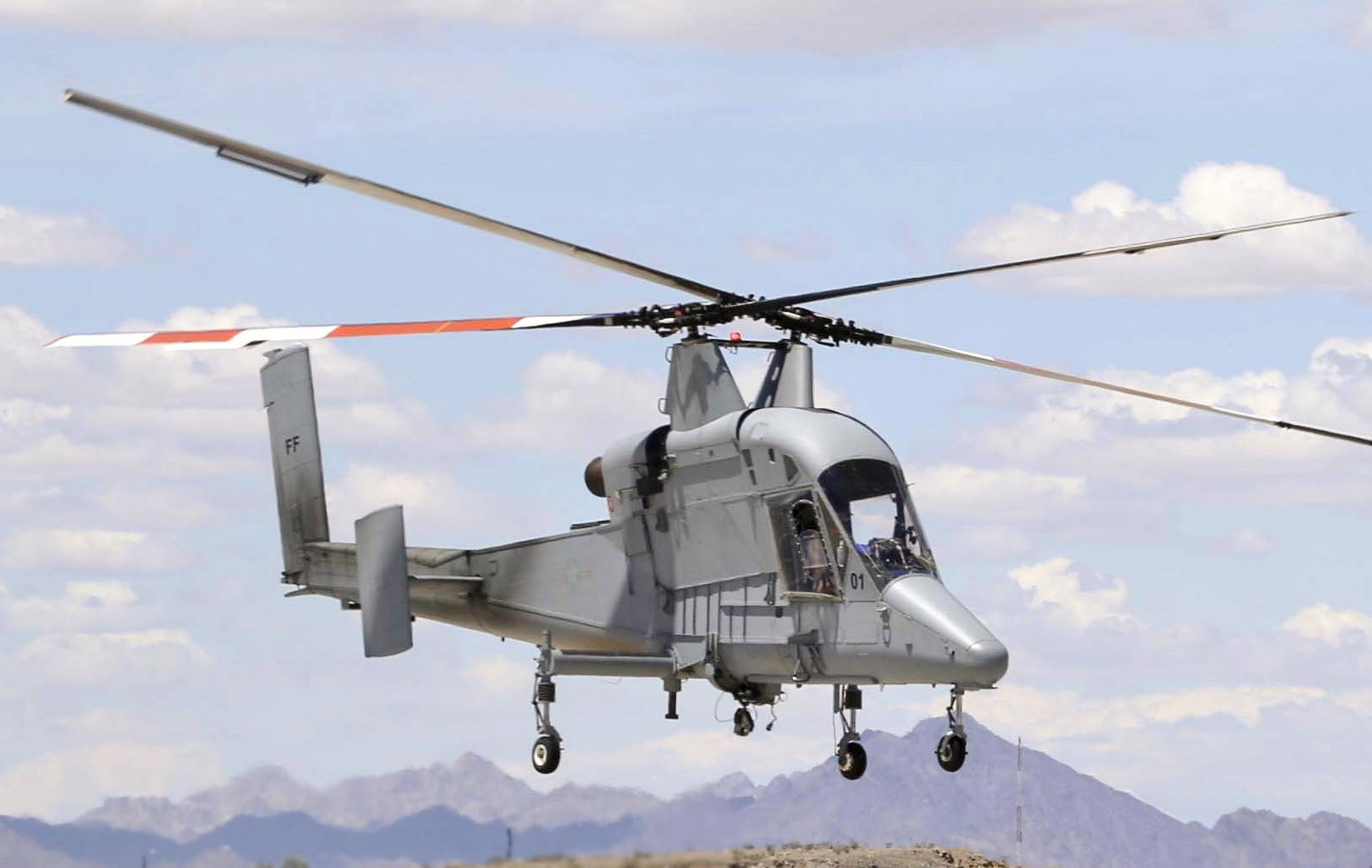
Unmanned K-MAX flown by the US Marines

On June 5, 2013, one of the unmanned K-MAX helicopters crashed in Afghanistan while flying a resupply mission. No injuries occurred, the subsequent accident investigation ruled out both pilot error and mechanical issue, the rotorcraft having been flying autonomously towards a predetermined point and performing during the final stages of cargo delivery at the time. Operational flights of the remaining unmanned K-MAX were suspended following the crash, the Navy stating at that time that it could resume flying by late August. Early on, swing load was viewed as the crash's prime cause. The investigation determined that the crash had been caused by unexpected tailwinds that the helicopter experienced while making the delivery, instead of headwinds, which caused it to begin oscillating. Operators employed a weathervane effect to try to regain control, but its 2,000 lb (910 kg) load began to swing, which exacerbated the effect and caused it to contact the ground. The accident report determined that it could have been prevented if pilots intervened earlier and mission planners received updated weather reports; diverging conditions and insufficient programming meant it could not recover on its own and required human intervention.

The K-MAX supporting Marines in Afghanistan was planned to remain in use there until at least August 2014. The Marine Corps was looking into acquiring the unmanned K-MAX as a program of record, and the United States Army was also looking into it to determine cost-effectiveness. In theater, the rotorcraft performed most missions at night and successfully lifted loads of up to 4,500 lb (2,000 kg). Hook-ups of equipment were performed in concert with individuals on the ground, however, Lockheed was looking into performing this action automatically through a device mounted atop the package that the helicopter can hook up to by itself; this feature was demonstrated in 2013. Other features were being examined, including the ability to be automatically re-routed in flight, and to fly in formation with other aircraft. The unmanned K-MAX was successfully able to deliver 30,000 lb (14,000 kg) of cargo in one day over the course of six missions (average 5,000 lb (2,300 kg) transported cargo per mission). Lockheed and Kaman discussed the purchasing of 16 helicopters with the Navy and Marine Corps for a baseline start to a program.

In May 2014, both of the unmanned K-MAX helicopters in use by the Marine Corps returned to the U.S., shortly after the Corps had determined that they were no longer needed to support missions in Afghanistan. After deploying in December 2011, originally planned for six months, they operated in the region for almost three years and lifted 2,250 tons of cargo. While the equipment entered storage, the service contemplated the possibility of turning the unmanned K-MAX from a proof-of-concept project into a program of record. Formal requirements for unmanned aerial cargo delivery are being written to address expected future threats, including electronic attack, cyber warfare, and effective hostile fire; these were avoided in Afghanistan quickly and cheaply by flying at night at high altitudes against an enemy with no signal degradation capabilities. Officials assessed the K-MAX helicopter that crashed and planned to repair it in 2015. The helicopters, ground control stations, and additional equipment are stored at Lockheed's facility in Owego. The two unmanned K-MAXs, designated CQ-24A, were to be moved to a Marine Corps base in Arizona by the end of September 2015 to develop tactics and operations concepts to inform an official program of record for a cargo UAV.

During November 2014, Lockheed Martin demonstrated a fire fighting version, another demonstration was performed in October 2015, in which the K-MAX delivered over 24,000 pounds (11,000 kg) of water in one hour. In March 2015, a casualty evacuation exercise was performed in coordination with an unmanned ground vehicle (UGV) and mission planning system. A medic launched the UGV to evaluate the casualty, used a tablet to call in and automatically land the K-MAX, then strapped a mannequin to a seat aboard the helicopter.

By January 2015, 11 K-MAX helicopters were reportedly no longer airworthy, some of which had been written off in accidents. Furthermore, an additional five were in storage at Kaman. By March 2015, the number of operational K-MAXs was reportedly 21, having flown a total of 315,000 hours among 250 pilots. Despite production of the type having been discontinued in 2023, Kaman pledged that it would continued to support the existing K-Max fleet in operation, which includes the provision of spare parts, servicing, training, and repairs to operators for the foreseeable future.

== Operators ==
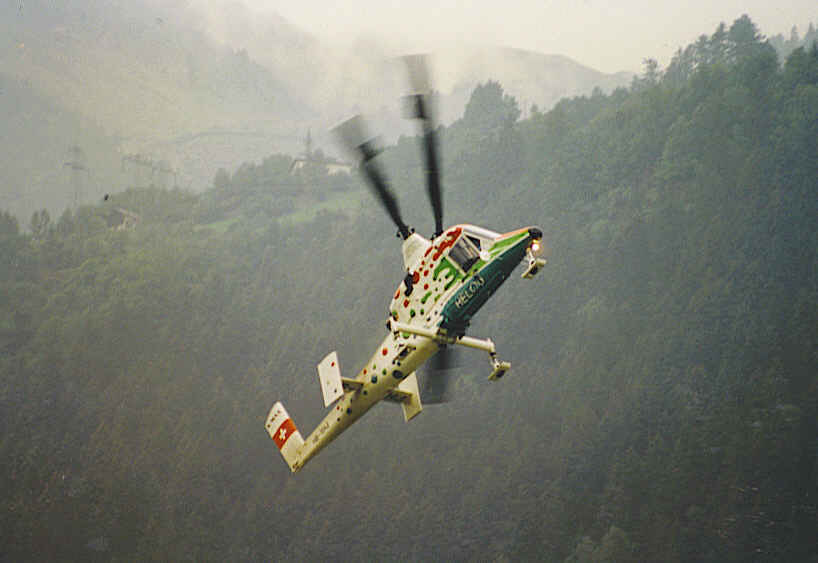
A HELOG Kaman K-Max (HB-XHJ, crashed in 1998)

Video of two US Marine Corps K-MAX landing

Canada

- HeliQwest Aviation

Colombia

- Colombian National Army Aviation

Japan

- Akagi Helicopter Co.

Liechtenstein

- Rotex Helicopter AG

New Zealand

- Skywork Helicopters Ltd.

Switzerland

- HELOG AG

United States

- Central Copters, Inc.
- Columbia Basin Helicopters (1 on order)
- Helicopter Express
- HeliQwest International
- Mountain West Helicopters
- ROTAK Helicopter Services
- Swanson Group Aviation
- Timberline Helicopters, Inc.
- United States Marine Corps

== Specifications (K-MAX) ==

Data from Jane's All the World's Aircraft 2000-01, K-MAX performance and specs, The Kaman K-MAX Specifications

General characteristics

- Crew: 1
- Capacity:

- 6,000 lb (2,722 kg) external load at ISA +15 °C (59.0 °F) at sea level
- 5,663 lb (2,569 kg) external load at ISA +15 °C (59.0 °F) at 5,000 ft (1,524 m)
- 5,163 lb (2,342 kg) external load at ISA +15 °C (59.0 °F) at 10,000 ft (3,048 m)
- 5,013 lb (2,274 kg) external load at ISA +15 °C (59.0 °F) at 12,100 ft (3,688 m)
- 4,313 lb (1,956 kg) external load at ISA +15 °C (59.0 °F) at 15,000 ft (4,572 m)

- Length: 52 ft (16 m) rotors running
- Length of fuselage: 41 ft 9 in (12.73 m)
- Width: 51 ft 5 in (15.67 m) with rotors running
- Height: 13 ft 7 in (4.14 m) to centreof hubs
- Empty weight: 5,145 lb (2,334 kg)
- Max takeoff weight: 6,500 lb (2,948 kg) without slung load

- 12,000 lb (5,443 kg) with jettisonable slung load

- Fuel capacity: 1,541 lb (699 kg) / 228.5 US gal (190 imp gal; 865 L)
- Powerplant: 1 × Honeywell T5317A-1 turboshaft engine, 1,350 shp (1,010 kW) flat rated for take-off up to ~29,000 ft (8,839 m) to increase transmission life

- Transmission rated to 1,500 shp (1,119 kW)

- Main rotor diameter: 2 × 48 ft 4 in (14.73 m)
- Main rotor area: 3,669 sq ft (340.9 m^{2})
- Blade section: - root: NACA 23012; tip: NACA 23011

Performance

- Never exceed speed: 100 kn (120 mph, 190 km/h) clean

80 kn (92 mph; 148 km/h) with external load

- Range: 300 nmi (350 mi, 560 km) with max load
- Service ceiling: 15,000 ft (4,600 m)
- Hover ceiling IGE: 26,300 ft (8,016 m) at 6,000 lb (2,722 kg) AUW, ISA
- Rate of climb: 2,500 ft/min (13 m/s) at Sea Level with flat-rated torque
- Disk loading: 3.52 lb/sq ft (17.2 kg/m^{2})
- Power/mass: 0.1045 hp/lb (0.1718 kW/kg)
- Fuel consumption: 85 gal/h (71 imp gal/h; 322 L/h)

== See also ==
External media

Images
- Autonomous K-MAX at Yuma

Video
- Unmanned K-MAX at Yuma
- K-MAX with wrecking ball

Related development

- Kaman HH-43 Huskie

Aircraft of comparable role, configuration, and era

- Kamov Ka-26
- Kamov Ka-226
