= Kurt Hohenemser =

German-born American aerospace engineer

- Born: January 3, 1906; Berlin, Germany
- Died: April 7, 2001 (aged 95); St. Louis, Missouri, United States
- Education: Technische Hochschule Darmstadt
- Engineering career
- Discipline: Aerospace Engineer, Professor
- Projects: Helicopters, Wind turbines

Kurt Heinrich Hohenemser (January 3, 1906 – April 7, 2001) was a German-born American aerospace engineer and pioneer in the field of helicopter design.

== Life in Germany ==
Kurt Hohenemser was born on January 3, 1906, in Berlin, Germany, to the German Jewish musicologist Richard Hohenemser and his English wife Alice Salt. He received his secondary education from the Goethe-Schule in Berlin-Wilmersdorf, Hermann-Lietz-Schule Haubinda, and Ziehenschule in Eschersheim. In 1924, Hohenemser received his Abitur. Hohenemser attended university at the Technische Hochschule Darmstadt from 1924 to 1929, receiving his Diplom-Ingenieur in 1927 and his Doktoringenieur in 1929. From 1930 until 1933, Hohenemser taught and conducted research at the University of Göttingen under Ludwig Prandtl, one of the most famous aerodynamics physicists during the 20th century. While at Göttingen, Hohenemser and his colleague William Prager organized a political discussion group, to which they invited another colleague who supported the ideologies of the Nazi Party. During these discussions, Hohenemser made comments critical of Nazi ideology. After the Nazis came to power in 1933, the colleague reported these statements, and Hohenemser was dismissed from his position at the university.

After his dismissal, Hohenemser worked briefly for aircraft manufacturer Gerhard Fieseler before going to work as a consultant for Anton Flettner's Flettner Flugzeubau GmbH, whose company specialized in the development and manufacture of helicopters. Kurt Hohenemser was an extraordinary engineer who developed the detailed designs required for the success of Flettner's helicopters. Hohenemser stayed with Flettner's company through the end of World War II. Though considered Jewish by the Nazis because of his Jewish father, Hohenemser's role in Flettner's company provided protection for him and his family during the war.

While at Flettner Flugzeubau GmbH, Hohenemser was instrumental in the development of the Fl 282 Kolibri. There were plans for BMW to mass-produce 1,000 Flettner Fl 282 helicopters but they were disrupted when allied forces bombed the designated factory.

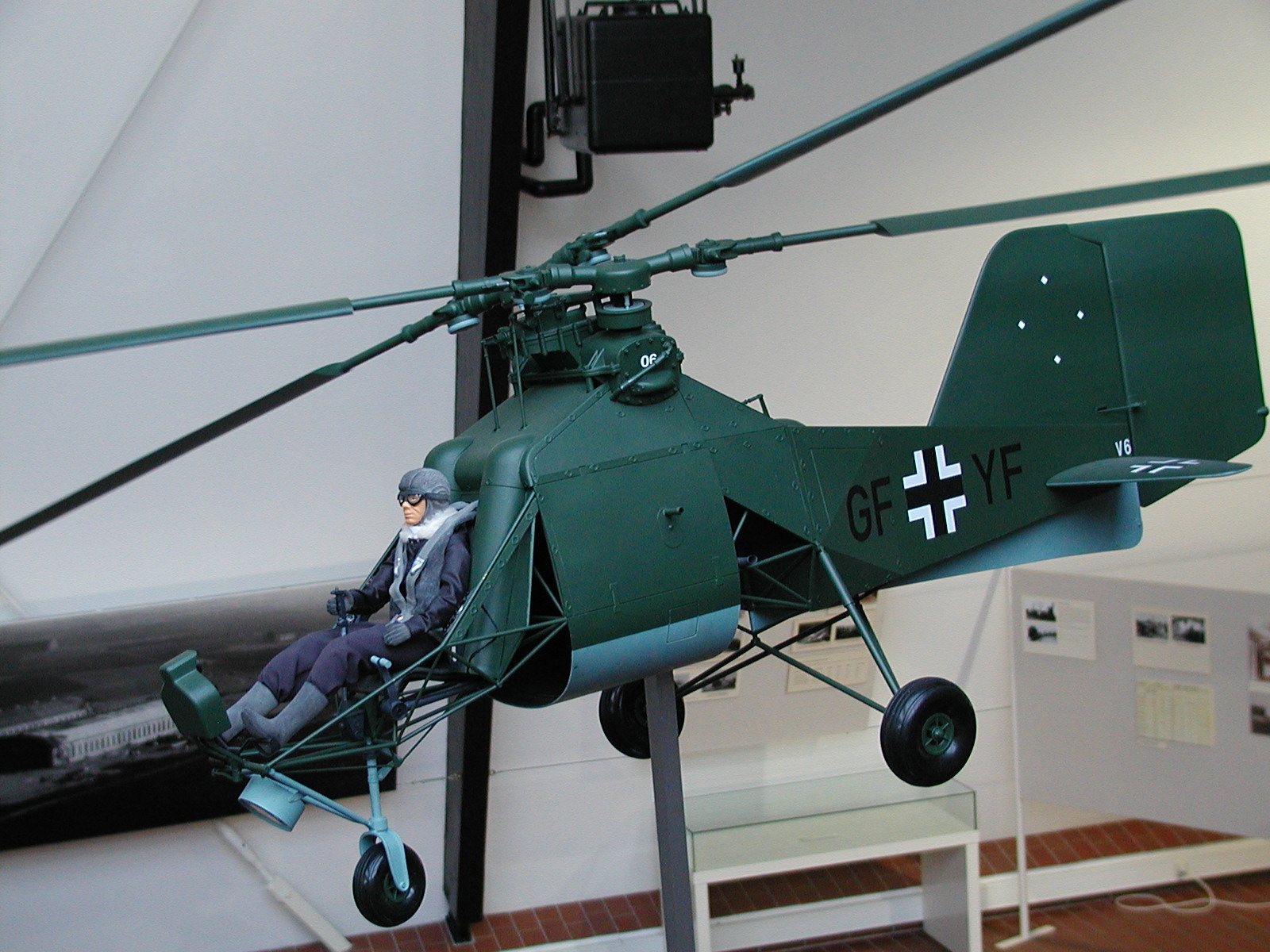
Flettner Fl 282 "Kolibri" was an early ancestor of helicopters with intermeshing rotors

== Life in the United States ==
Kurt Hohenemser emigrated from Germany to the United States with his family in 1947. Hohenemser and Anton Flettner were among the first German emigrants into the United States after World War II.

Hohenemser and Anton Flettner, who together developed numerous patents in Germany, maintained close contact after both men emigrated to the United States. During 1949, Anton Flettner employed Hohenemser as a consultant to the Flettner Aircraft Corporation.

Hohenemser later accepted a position as chief aerodynamics engineer of the helicopter division of McDonnell Aircraft in St. Louis, Missouri. In this role, Hohenemser oversaw work on such designs as the Little Henry, Big Henry, and the XV-1, a precursor of the V-22 Osprey. After working for McDonnell for 18 years, he took a position as professor of aerospace engineering at Washington University in St. Louis in 1966. He retired in 1975 but remained as emeritus professor for two more decades. From 1966 and beyond, Hohenemser shifted his focus from helicopters to wind turbines.

Kurt Hohenemser, a longtime colleague and confidant of Anton Flettner, worked his remaining years in the United States to prove Flettner's idea that properly designed flexible helicopter-type rotors are more suitable for producing electricity from the wind than rigid airplane-type rotors. An offshore wind energy project announced in February 2017, involving Seawind Ocean Technology B.V., aims to demonstrate the wind energy applications put forth by Anton Flettner, Kurt Hohenemser, and Glidden Doman in harsh wind and sea conditions.

Kurt Heinrich Hohenemser died on April 7, 2001, in St. Louis, Missouri. Up until the age of 91, Hohenemser cross-country skied every winter and he rode a bicycle everywhere into his 80s out of concern for the pollution produced by automobiles. Hohenemser received many accolades during his career, among them the Grover E. Bell Award (1957) and the Alexander Klemin Award (1964) from the American Helicopter Society.

== Photo gallery ==
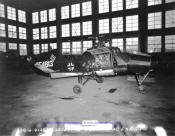
Flettner Fl 282 Kolibri helicopter

Letter from Dr. Hohenemser regarding his association with Anton Flettner (page 1 of 2)

Letter from Dr. Hohenemser regarding his association with Anton Flettner (page 2 of 2)

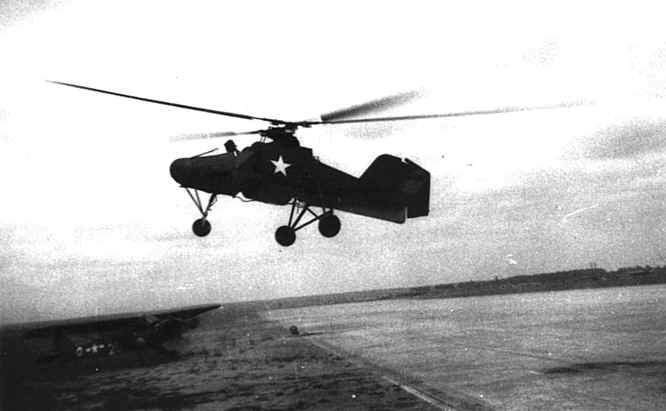
Flettner Fl 282 during flight trials after World War II, with US markings

== Publications ==
- Kurt H. Hohenemser and Andrew H.P. Swift. "Wind Turbine Speed Control by Automatic Yawing", Journal of Energy, Vol. 7, No. 3 (1983), pp. 237–242.
- Gopal H. Gaonkar and Kurt H. Hohenemser. "An Advanced Stochastic Model for Threshold Crossing Studies of Rotor Blade Vibrations", AIAA Journal, Vol. 10, No. 8 (1972), pp. 1100–1101.
- Kurt H. Hohenemser. "Attachment of Rotor Blades by Laminated Elastic Straps", Journal of the Aeronautical Sciences, Vol. 19, No. 5 (1952), pp. 350–350.
- Kurt H. Hohenemser. "Equations for the Approximate Solution of Dynamic Problems for Stable Linear Systems", Journal of the Aeronautical Sciences, Vol. 16, No. 12 (1949), pp. 723–728.
- Kurt H. Hohenemser. "Analysis and test results for a two-bladed, passive cycle pitch, horizontal-axis wind turbine in free and controlled yaw", National Renewable Energy Laboratory, NREL-TP-442-7391, October 1995, pp. 1–134.
- Richard von Mises and Kurt H. Hohenemser. "Theory of Flight (Dover Books on Aeronautical Engineering)", Dover Publications; 1st edition (June 1, 1959), 672 pages.
- Kurt H. Honenemser, Andrew H.P. Swift, D. A. Peters, Washington University Technology Associates, Inc., Solar Research Institute. "A definitive generic study for sailwing wind energy systems : non-technical summary report : final report", Golden, Colo.: Solar Energy Research Institute, 1979.
- Kurt H. Honenemser, Andrew H.P. Swift, D. A. Peters, United States Department of Energy, Solar Research Institute. "The yawing of wind turbines with blade cyclic pitch variation : final report", Goden, Colo. : Solar Energy Research Institute, 1981.
- Kurt H. Honenemser, Andrew H.P. Swift, Washington University Technology Associates, Inc.. "The investigation of passive blade cyclic pitch variation using an automatic yaw control system : a subcontract report", New York : American Solar Energy Society; Springfield, Va. : National Technical Information Service, 1982.
- Kurt H. Hoheneemser, Robert A. Ormiston, North Atlantic Treaty Organization, Advisory Group for Aerospace Research and Development, Flight Mechanics Panel. "Hingeless rotorcraft flight dynamics", [Neuilly-sur-Seine, France] North Atlantic Treaty Organization, Advisory Group for Aerospace Research and Development [1974].
- Kurt H.Hohenemser. "Die Methoden ƶur Angenäherten Lösung von Eigenwertproblemen in der Elastokinetik", Springer-Verlag, Mar 9, 2013 - Technology & Engineering - 92 pages.
- Kurt H. Hohenemser. "Praktische Wege zur angenäherten Schwingungsberechnung elastischer Systeme", Springer, 1930 - 24 pages.
- Richard von Mises and Kurt H. Hohenemser. "Theorie und Berechnung der Flugzeuge in elementarer Darstellung", Springer; 6 edition (October 4, 2013), 402 pages.
- Kurt H. Hohenemser. "Die Methoden zur angenäherten Lösung von Eigenwertproblemen in der Elastokinetik", Springer; 1932 edition (October 4, 2013), 92 pages.
