= Flettner =

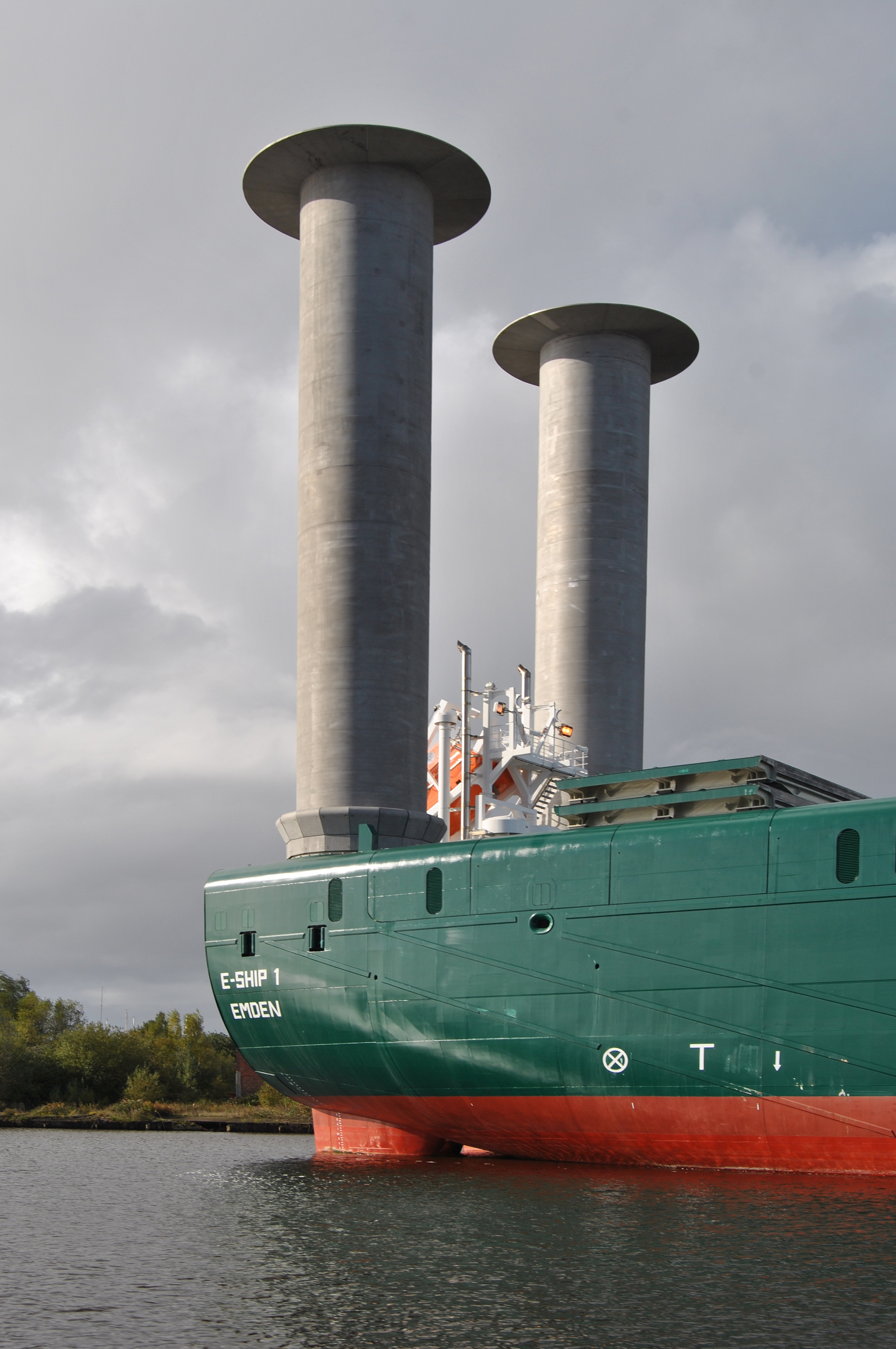
Flettner rotors (at the E-Ship 1)

Anton Flettner, Flugzeugbau GmbH was a German helicopter and autogyro manufacturer during World War II, founded by Anton Flettner.

Flettner aircraft included:

- Flettner Fl 184 - Reconnaissance autogyro, prototype
- Flettner Fl 185 - Reconnaissance helicopter, prototype
- Flettner Fl 265 - Reconnaissance helicopter, prototype
- Flettner Fl 282 Kolibri (Hummingbird) - Reconnaissance helicopter
- Flettner Fl 339 - Reconnaissance helicopter, project
- Flettner Gigant - Experimental helicopter

Anton Flettner's interest in aerodynamics (specifically the Magnus effect, which produces a force from a cylinder rotating in a fluid flow) also led him to invent the Flettner rotor which he used to power a Flettner ship which crossed the Atlantic, and the Flettner ventilator which is still widely used as a cooling device for buses, vans and other commercial vehicles and which is based upon the Savonius principle.

== See also ==
- Gyrodyne
- List of RLM aircraft designations
