= Flettner Fl 265 =

Type of experimental helicopter

Fl 265
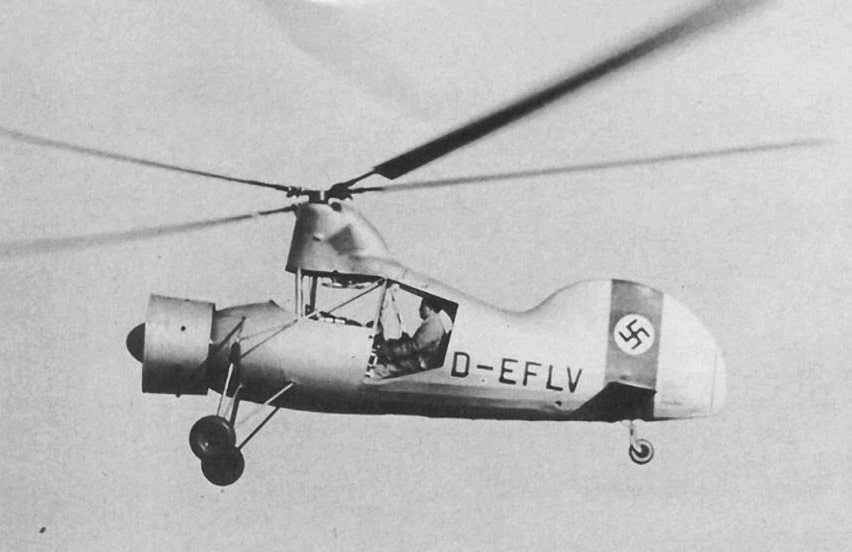
- Flettner Fl 265 in flight

General information
- Type: Experimental helicopter
- Manufacturer: Flettner
- Designer: Anton Flettner
- Primary user: Luftwaffe
- Number built: 6

History
- First flight: 1939
- Variant: Flettner Fl 282

The Flettner Fl 265 was an experimental helicopter designed by Anton Flettner.

== Design and development ==
This helicopter, developed in 1938 with the support of Nazi Germany's Kriegsmarine, made it possible, for the first time, to transition from powered rotary-wing flight to autorotation and back again, making it the safest helicopter of its time. In contrast to the Fl 185, the Fl 265, believed to be the pioneering example of a synchropter, had two intermeshing rotors 12 m in diameter, powered by a 160 hp (119 kW) BMW-Bramo Sh 14 A radial engine in the nose of the fuselage, fitted with a fan to assist cooling. Six helicopters were constructed, but series production was curtailed in favour of the Flettner Fl 282.

In 1939 the helicopter was tested by test pilot Richard Perlia. A second test pilot alongside Perlia had a fatal accident during a test flight.

== Operators ==
Germany

- Luftwaffe

== Specifications (Fl 265) ==
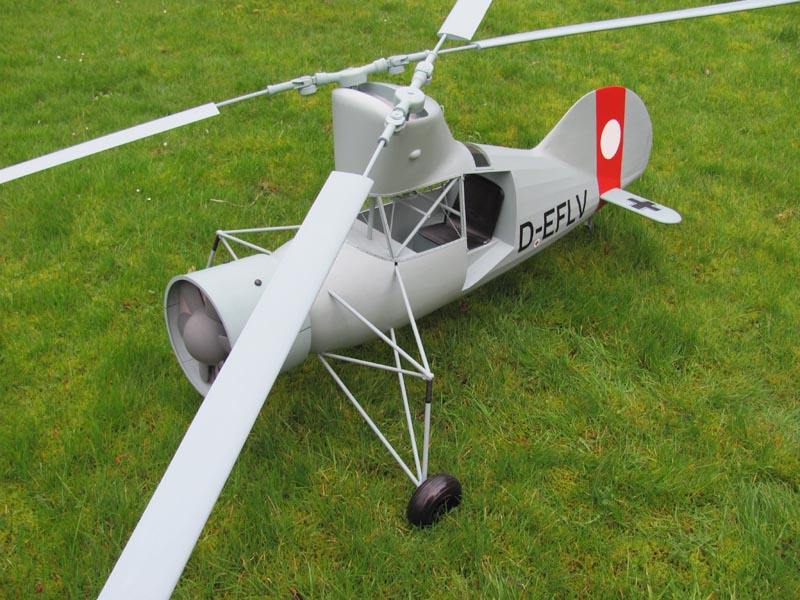
Flettner Fl 265 in scale of 1 : 4,6 as shown at the Helicopter Museum of Bückeburg

Data from

General characteristics

- Crew: 1
- Length: 6.16 m (20 ft 3 in)
- Height: 2.82 m (9 ft 3 in)
- Empty weight: 800 kg (1,764 lb)
- Max takeoff weight: 1,000 kg (2,205 lb)
- Powerplant: 1 × Bramo Sh.14A 7-cyl. fan-assisted air-cooled radial piston engine, 119 kW (160 hp)
- Main rotor diameter: 2 × 12.3 m (40 ft 4 in)
- Main rotor area: 237.6 m^{2} (2,558 sq ft) total area

Performance

- Maximum speed: 140 km/h (87 mph, 76 kn) at sea level
- Range: 300 km (190 mi, 160 nmi)
- Service ceiling: 4,100 m (13,500 ft)

== See also ==
- Kaman K-125
