= Intermeshing-rotor helicopter =

Helicopter with two rotors turning in opposite directions

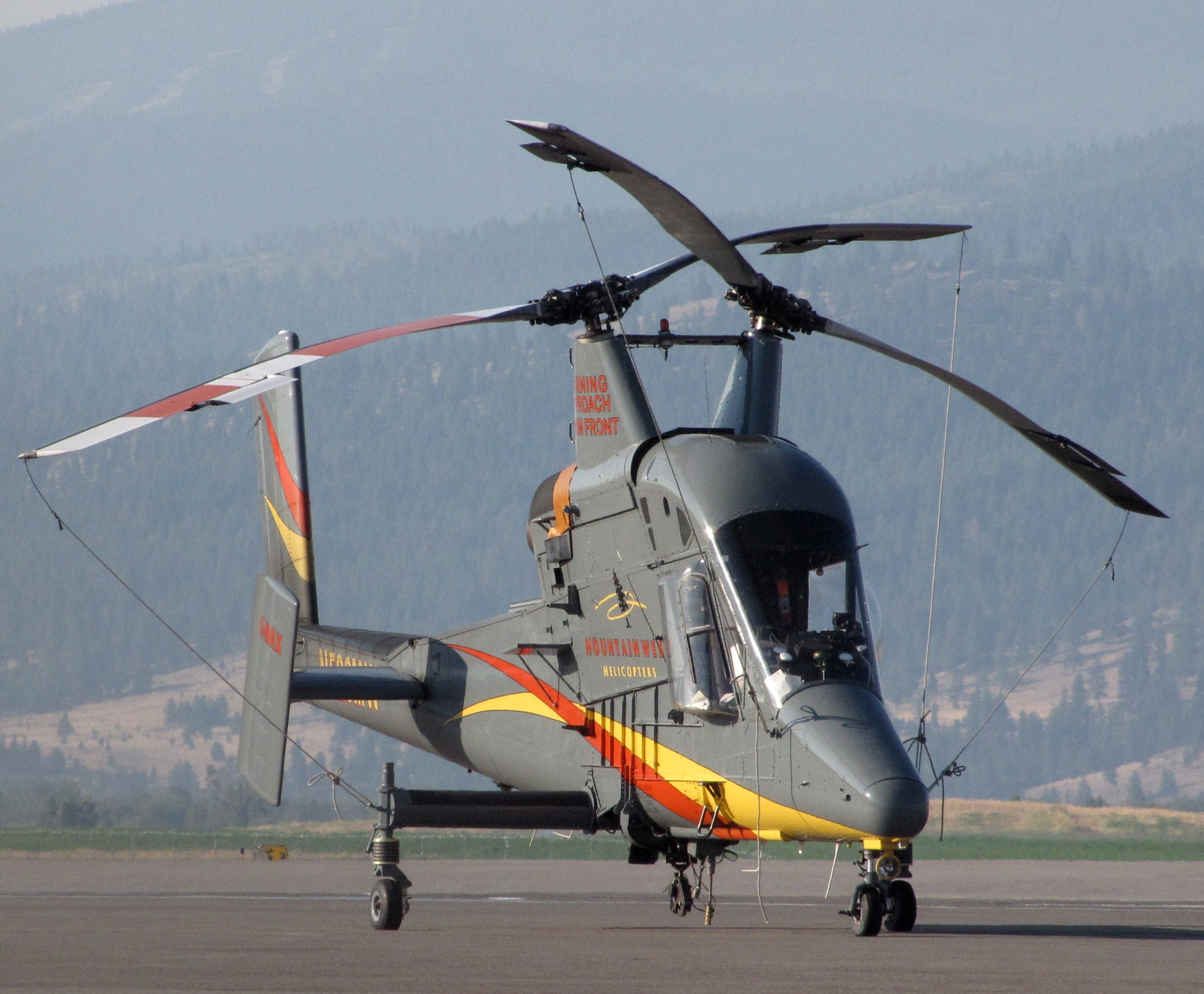
Kaman K-Max, Missoula MT / 2010

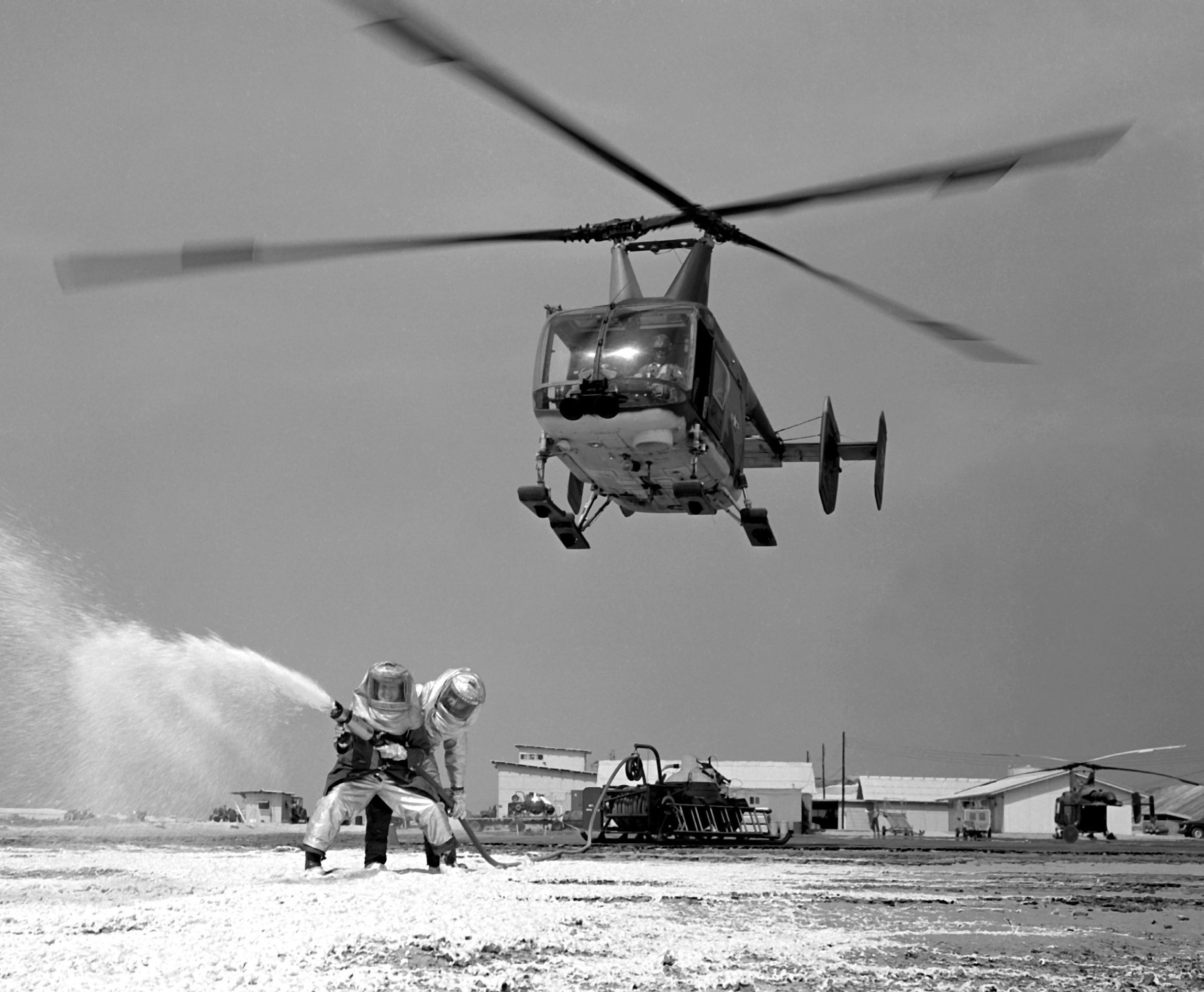
HH-43 Huskie with intermeshing rotors

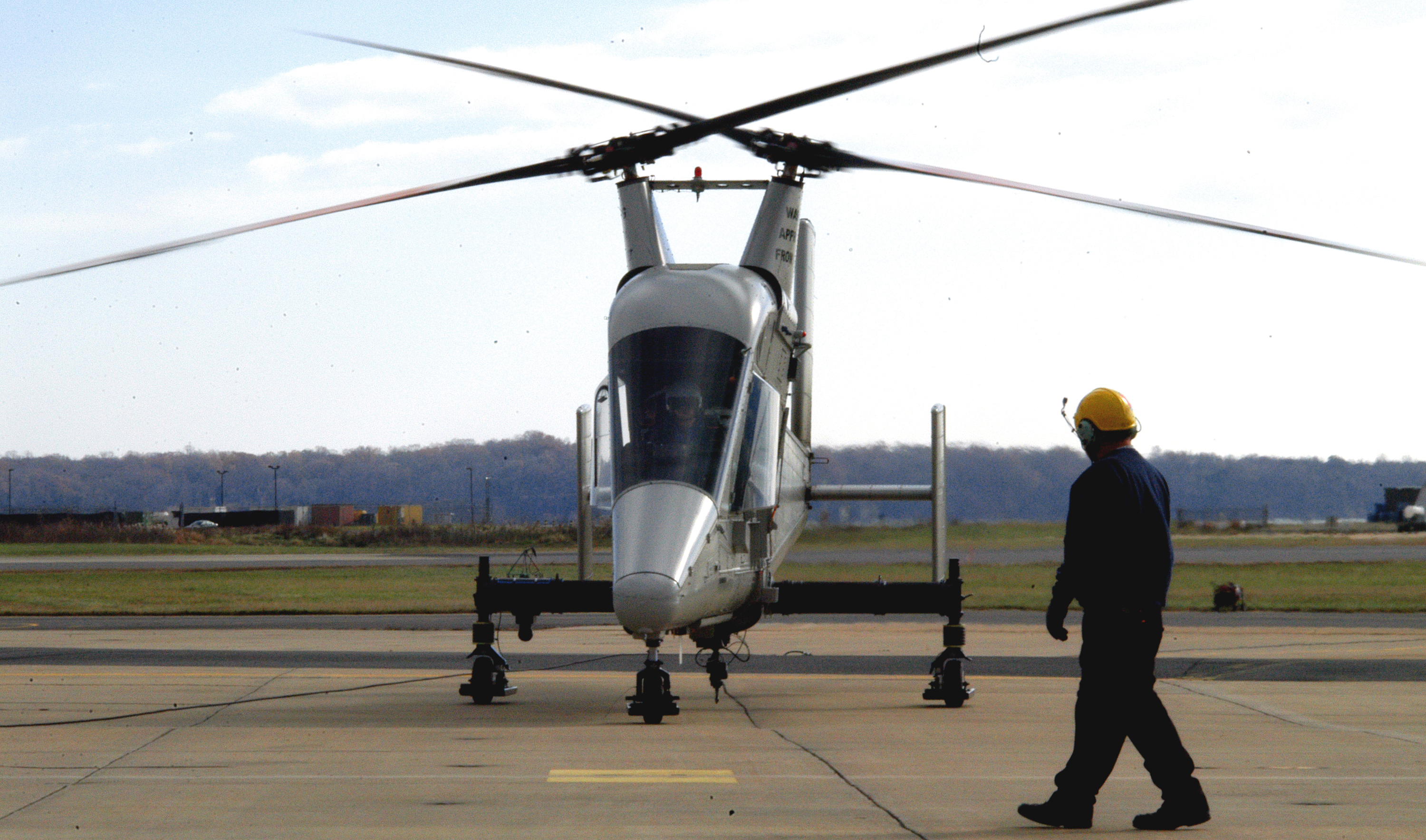
Kaman K-MAX is optimized for external cargo load operations. Unmanned, remote control or optionally piloted variant

An intermeshing-rotor helicopter (or synchropter) is a helicopter with a set of two main rotors turning in opposite directions, with each rotor mast mounted with a slight angle to the other, in a transversely symmetrical manner, so that the blades intermesh without colliding. The arrangement allows the helicopter to function without a tail rotor, which saves power. However, neither rotor lifts directly vertically, which reduces efficiency per each rotor.

Yaw is accomplished through varying torque, which is done by increasing collective pitch on one of the blade sets.

Most intermeshing designs have two blades per mast, although exceptions such as the Kellett XR-10 with three blades per mast do exist.

The arrangement was developed in Germany by Anton Flettner for a small anti-submarine warfare helicopter, the Flettner Fl 265 as the pioneering example, and later the Flettner Fl 282 Kolibri. During the Cold War the American Kaman Aircraft company produced the HH-43 Huskie, for USAF firefighting purposes. One example of the Kaman K-225 experimental synchropter was fitted with a small turboshaft engine in late 1951, becoming the world's first gas turbine-powered helicopter. Intermeshing rotored helicopters have high stability and powerful lifting capability. The latest Kaman K-MAX model is a dedicated sky-crane design used for construction work, and has been modified for trials by the USMC as an optionally-unmanned cargo transporter. Unmanned aerial vehicles with intermeshing rotors have also been flown.

== Examples ==
- Flettner Fl 265 (1939)
- Flettner Fl 282 (1941)
- Kellett XR-8 (1944)
- Kaman K-225 (1947)
- Kellett XR-10 (1947)
- Praga E-1 (1947)
- SNCAC NC.2001 Abeille (1949)
- Kaman HH-43 Huskie (1953)
- Kaman K-700 (1969) (abandoned)
- Clybouw CW-105F (1973)
- DeGraw RDX1091 Hummingbird (1984)
- Kaman K-MAX (1991)
- Anavia HT-100 (2024)

== See also ==
- Coaxial-rotor helicopter
- Tandem-rotor helicopter
- Transverse-rotor helicopter
- Tiltrotor
