= Flettner Fl 184 =

1930s German reconnaissance gyroplane

Fl 184
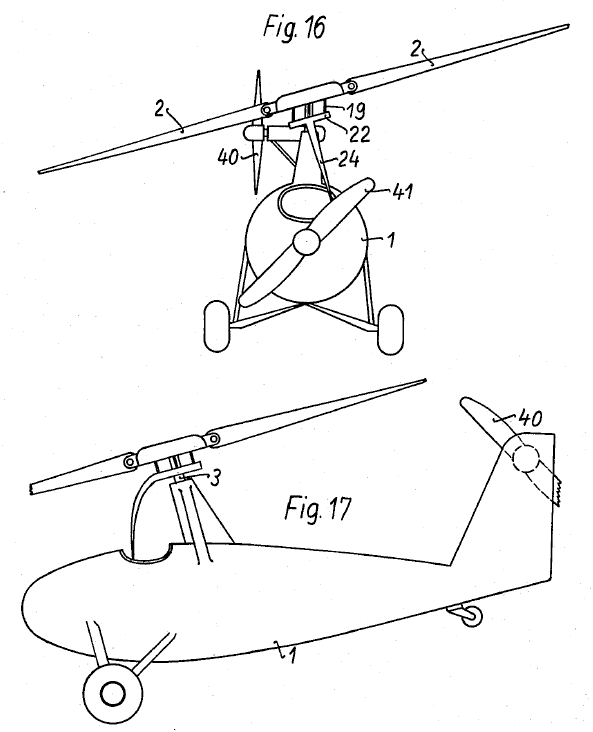
- Image from Anton Flettner's autogyro patent, "Aircrfaft", US Patent 2030578, 2 October 1933

General information
- Type: Autogyro
- Manufacturer: Flettner
- Designer: Anton Flettner
- Number built: 1

History
- First flight: 1930s

The Flettner 184 was a German night reconnaissance and anti-submarine autogyro developed during the 1930s.

== Design ==
The Fl 184 was a two-seat autogyro with an enclosed cabin. The Fl 184 rotors had a length of 12 m and a cyclic pitch control system. The aircraft's power was supplied by a 160 PS (160 hp; 120 kW) Siemens-Halske Sh 14A radial engine that drove a two-bladed wooden propeller.

== Operational history ==
The sole Fl 184, given the registration D-EDVE, was scheduled to be tested for night reconnaissance in late 1936. However, before these tests could take place, it caught fire whilst in flight and crashed.

After the crash the entire program was cancelled and no more aircraft were manufactured.

== Specifications ==
Data from

General characteristics

- Crew: 2
- Powerplant: 1 × Siemens-Halske Sh 14A 7-cyl. air-cooled radial piston engine, 120 kW (160 hp)
- Main rotor diameter: 12 m (39 ft 4 in)
- Main rotor area: 113.1 m^{2} (1,217 sq ft) 3-bladed autorotating
- Propellers: 2-bladed fixed pitch tractor propeller

Performance
