= Trim tab =

Boat or aircraft component

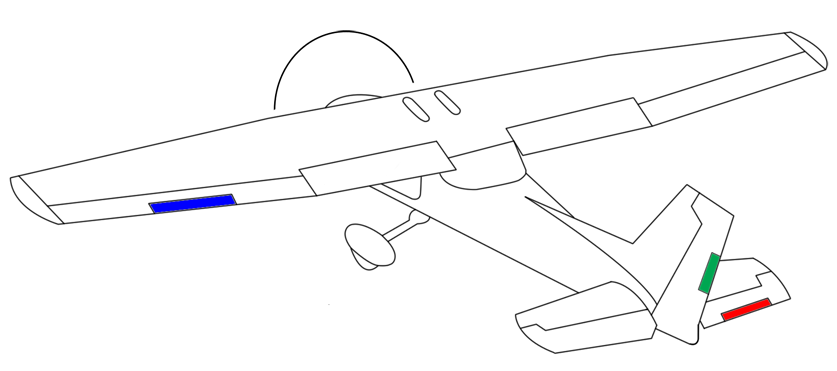
Typical trim tabs on aileron, rudder and elevator

Trim tabs are small surfaces connected to the trailing edge of a larger control surface on a boat or aircraft, used to control the trim of the controls, i.e. to counteract hydro- or aerodynamic forces and stabilise the boat or aircraft in a particular desired attitude without the need for the operator to constantly apply a control force. This is done by adjusting the angle of the tab relative to the larger surface.

Changing the setting of a trim tab adjusts the neutral or resting position of a control surface (such as an elevator or rudder). As the desired position of a control surface changes (corresponding mainly to different speeds), an adjustable trim tab will allow the operator to reduce the manual force required to maintain that position—to zero, if desired. Thus the trim tab acts as a servo tab. Because the center of pressure of the trim tab is farther away from the axis of rotation of the control surface than the center of pressure of the control surface, the moment generated by the tab can match the moment generated by the control surface. The position of the control surface on its axis will change until the torques from the control surface and the trim surface balance each other.

== On boats ==
Planing boats or boats that operate at speeds close to planing will often have trim tabs on their engine lower unit or attached to the transom. Adjusting them up or down alters the pitch attitude of the boat while under way, variously balancing speed, weight distribution, and sea conditions.

== On aircraft ==
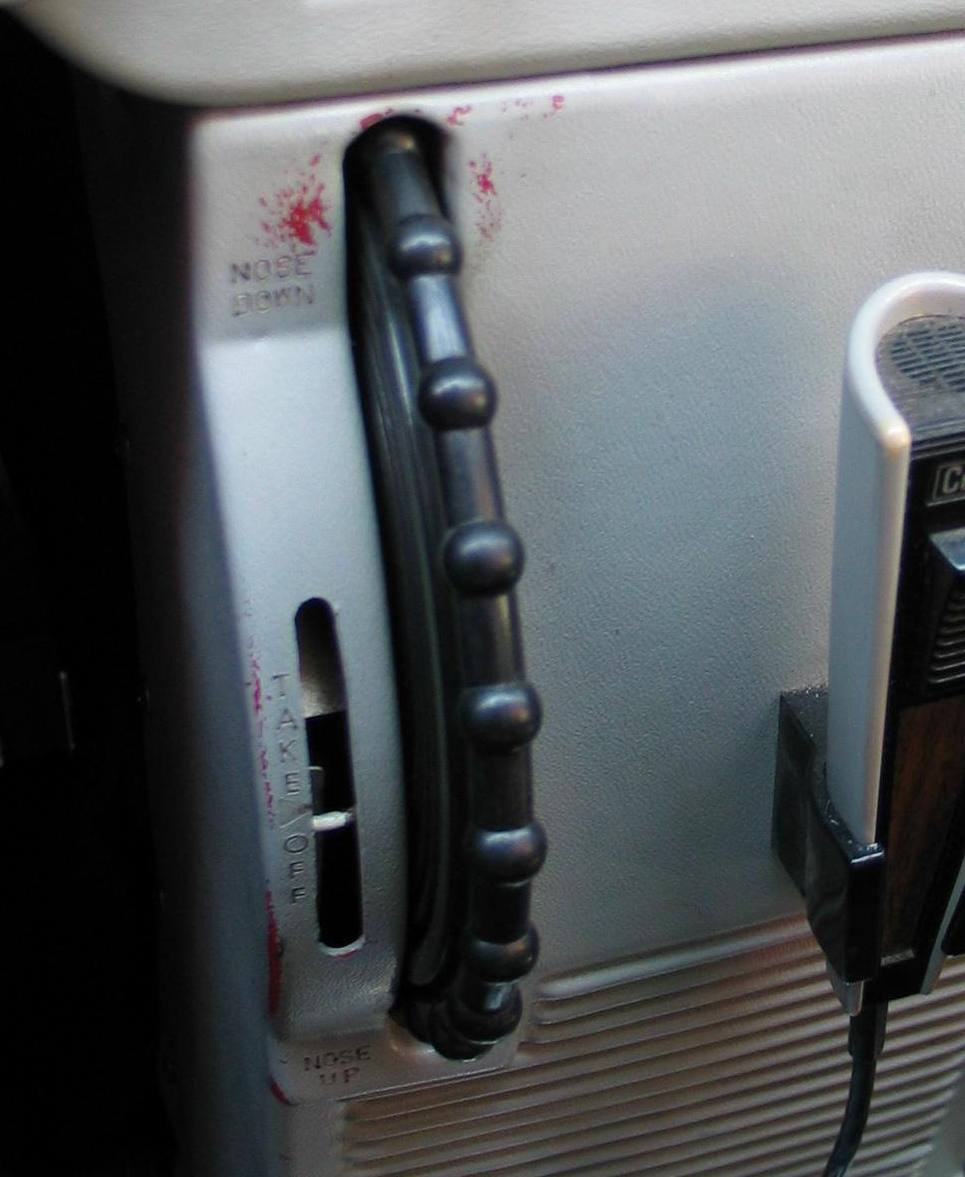
The trim-tab control of a Cessna 172. Rotating the wheel upwards changes the 'hands-off' elevator position to create a more nose-down attitude, downwards more nose-up.

Trim tabs are variously integrated into the rudder, elevators, and ailerons of a fixed-wing aircraft. As such, they are elements of an aircraft's system for allowing the pilot to control and maintain airspeed with a minimum of inputs and mental concentration. Many newer aircraft, especially jet aircraft, have electric trim controls.

Elevator trim frees the pilot from exerting constant force on the pitch controls, by adjusting trim control (often in the form of a vertical wheel) to cancel out control forces for a given airspeed and weight distribution. Typically, when this wheel is rotated up (or lever raised) the aircraft's nose pitches down; rotating it down (or depressing the lever) lowers the tail and raises the nose.

Many airplanes also have rudder or aileron trim systems. On some, the rudder trim tab is hinged and adjustable during flight; on others it is only adjustable on the ground (to lessen the need for the pilot to push the rudder pedal constantly to overcome the left-turning tendencies of many prop-driven aircraft).

Most fixed-wing aircraft have a trim tab on the elevator. However, alternative means of controlling the speed and attitude of the aircraft are sometimes used, including:

- a spring included in the control system that can be adjusted by the pilot
- in the case of the elevator, an all-moving horizontal stabilizer, called a stabilator, the position of which can be adjusted in flight by a servo tab or an anti-servo tab.
- On some aircraft (e.g. Concorde, McDonnell Douglas MD-11), fuel may be shifted to tanks in the tail during cruise to reposition the center of gravity in order to reduce trim drag. Maintaining the center of gravity near the aft-most limit for cruise improves cruise efficiency.

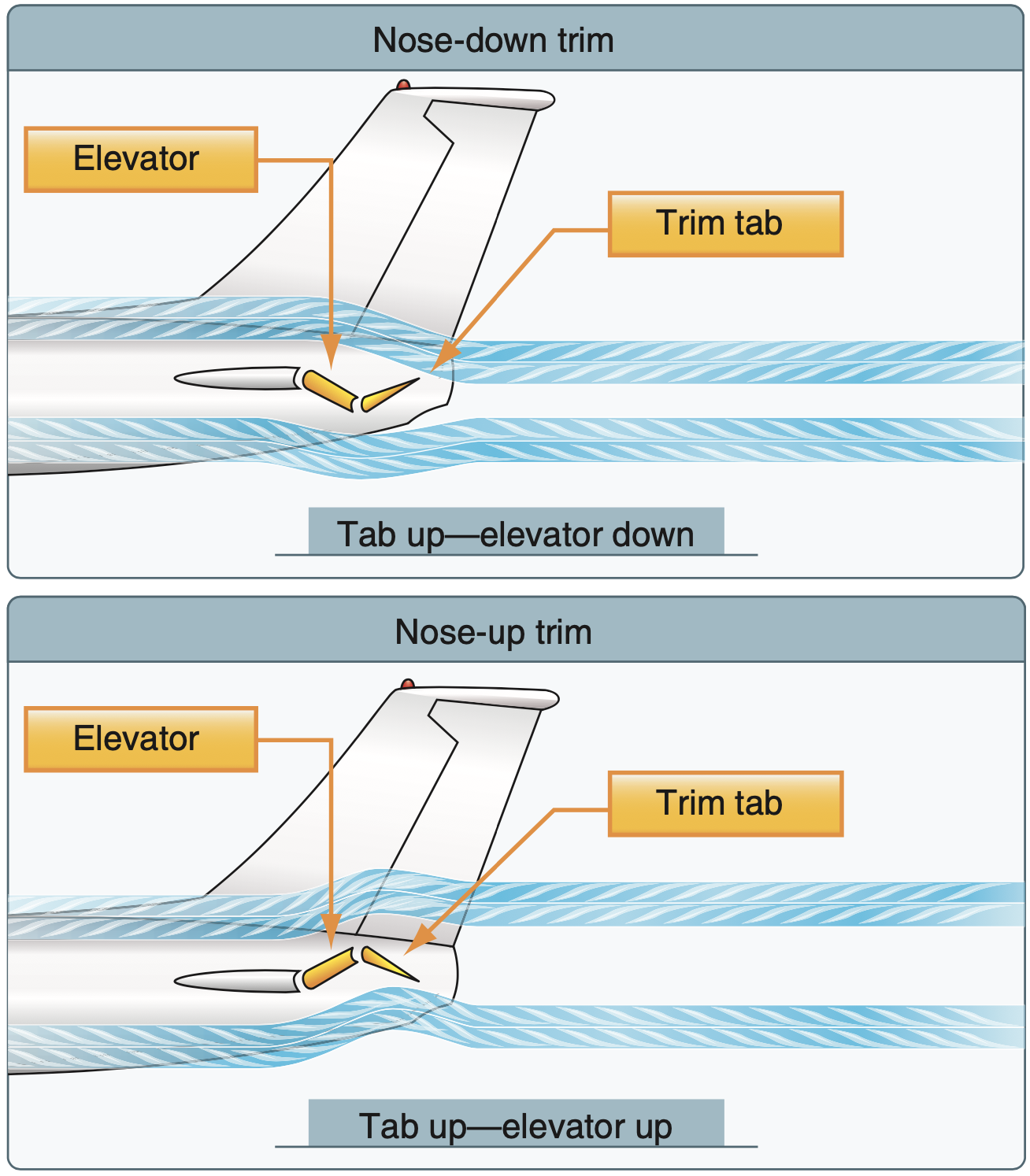
The movement of the elevator is opposite that of its trim tab.

When a servo tab is employed, it is moved into the slipstream opposite to the control surface's desired deflection. For example, in order to trim an elevator to hold the nose down, the elevator's trim tab will actually rise up into the slipstream. The increased pressure on top of the trim tab surface caused by raising it will then deflect the entire elevator slab down slightly, causing the tail to rise and the aircraft's nose to move down. In the case of an aircraft where deployment of high-lift devices (flaps) would significantly alter the longitudinal trim, a supplementary trim tab is arranged to simultaneously deploy with the flaps so that pitch attitude is not markedly changed.

The use of trim tabs significantly reduces pilots' workload during continuous maneuvers (e.g. sustained climb to altitude after takeoff or descent prior to landing), allowing them to focus their attention on other tasks such as traffic avoidance or communication with air traffic control.

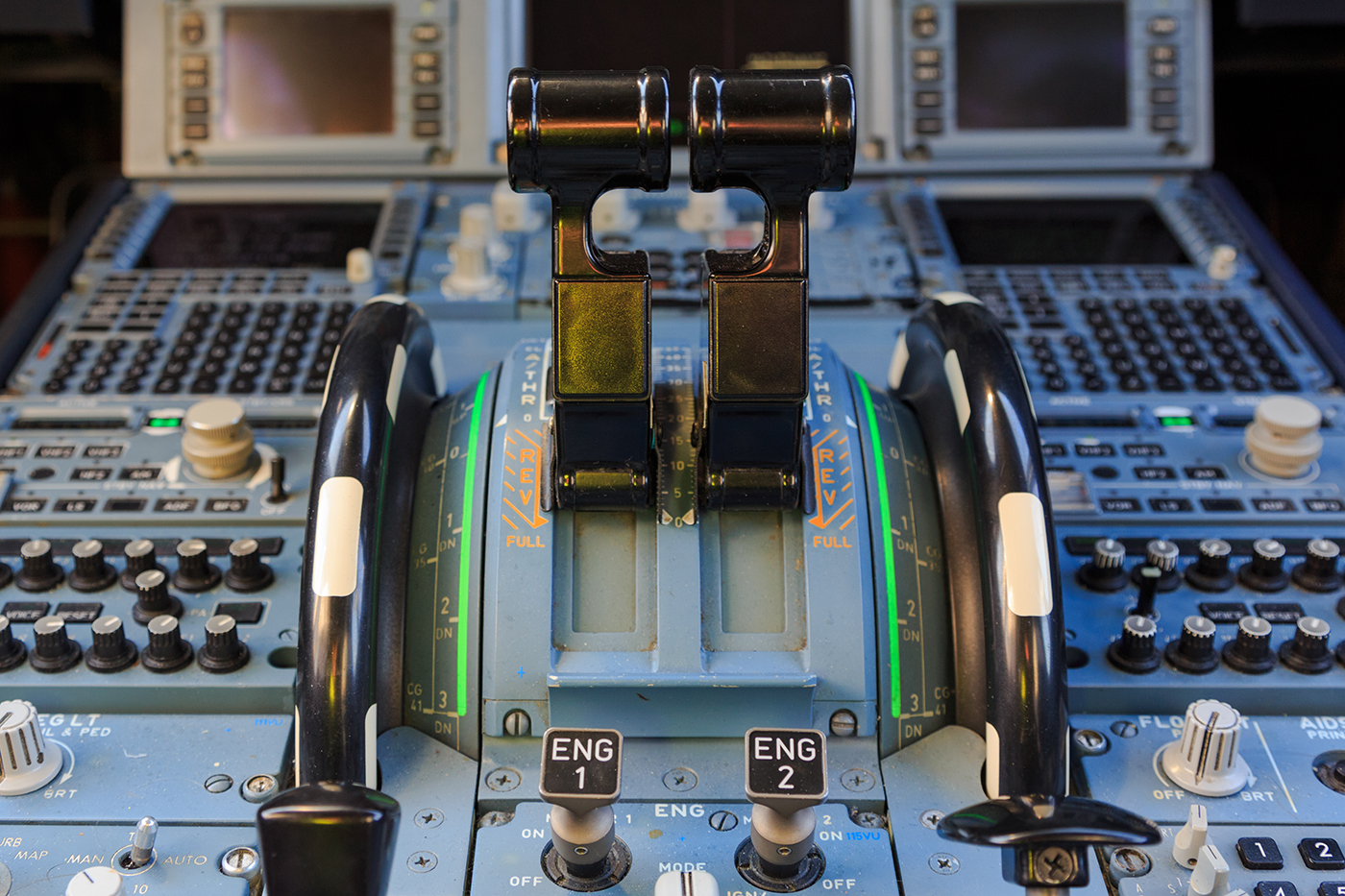
The black and white marked trim control wheels on the center console on an airliner

Both elevator trim and pitch trim affect the small trimming part of the elevator on jet airliners. The former is supposed to be set in a certain position for a longer time, while the pitch trim (controlled with the landing pilot's thumb on the yoke or joystick, and thereby easy to maneuver) is used all the time after the flying pilot has disabled the autopilot, especially after each time the flaps are lowered or at every change in the airspeed, at the descent, approach and final. Elevator trim is most used for controlling the attitude at cruising by the autopilot.

Beyond reducing pilot workload, proper trim also increases fuel efficiency by reducing drag. For example, propeller aircraft have a tendency to yaw when operating at high power, for instance when climbing; this increases parasitic drag because the craft is not flying straight into the apparent wind. In such circumstances, the use of an adjustable rudder trim tab can reduce yaw.

=== Military ===
On military aircraft during wartime, trim tabs often served as unintentional backup control systems for aircraft with damaged controls. Since trim tabs are usually controlled by their own dedicated system of control cables, rods, and/or hydraulic lines, aircraft that had suffered loss of primary controls could often be flown home "on the trim tabs", or by using trim adjustment as a replacement for the non-working primary controls. Such control is effective, if slower and more limited than primary controls, but it does allow the aircraft to be controlled and directed. In other cases, such as engine failure or damage causing asymmetric drag, trim tabs were invaluable for allowing the pilot to fly the aircraft straight without having to apply a constant force on the stick or rudder to keep the aircraft flying straight.

Trim tabs were also important for aircraft such as bombers, which often underwent rapid changes in center-of-gravity when the bombload was dropped, requiring a hand ready on the trim-adjusting wheel to counteract the tendency of the aircraft to pitch up or down. Undertaking high-speed dives or deploying flaps also generally necessitated pitch trim adjustment, as aircraft of the era had different pitch tendencies at different airspeeds, and flaps could change the center of pressure.

Consumption of fuel could require periodic trim adjustment during a long flight, as it was difficult to ensure that all fuel tanks were equally near the center of gravity. An extreme example was the later P-51 Mustang, which was given a large fuel tank behind the cockpit to allow long-range missions; as fuel from this tank was consumed it was necessary for regular adjustment of the elevator trim.

== As a metaphor ==
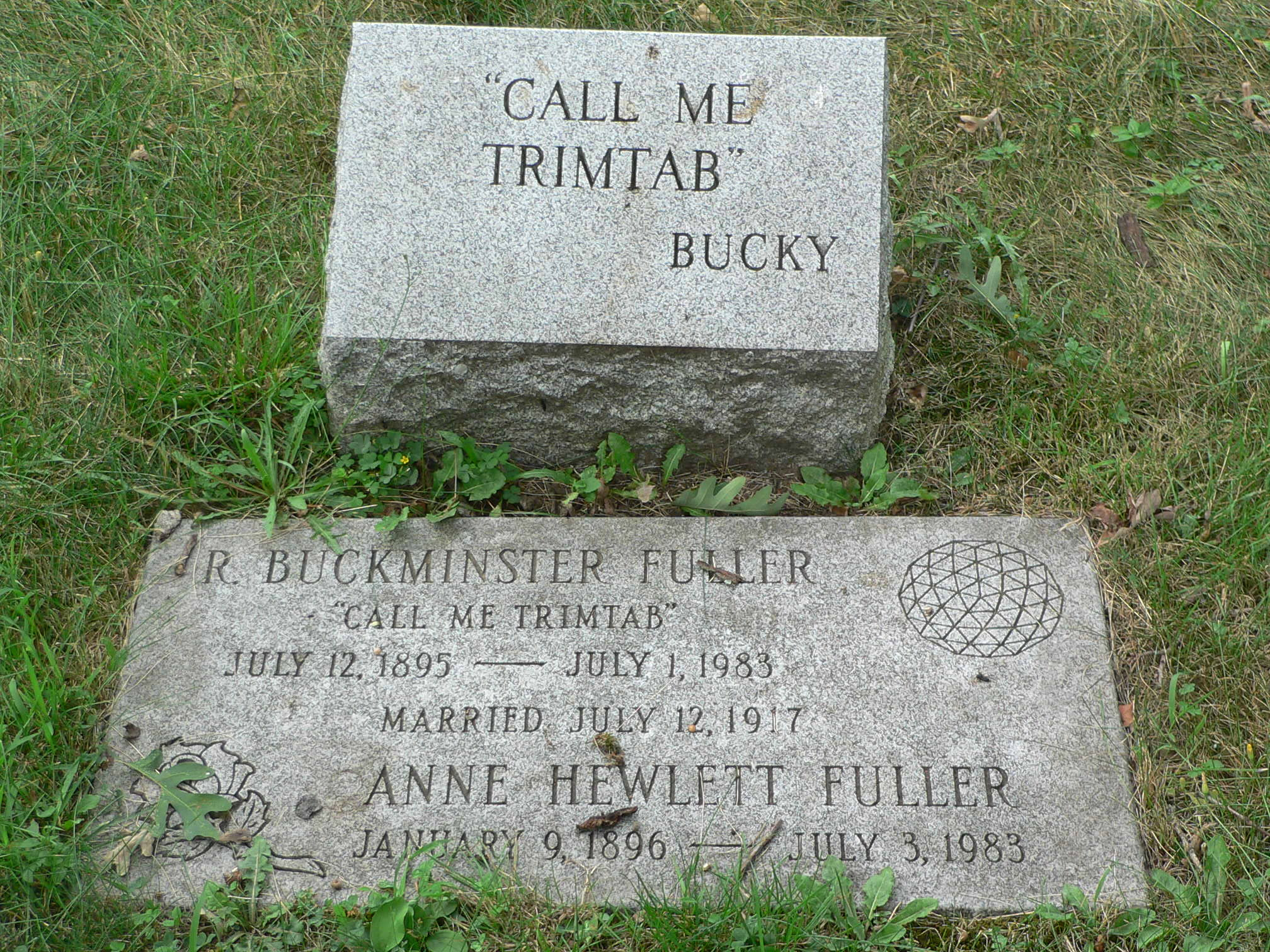
Grave of Buckminster Fuller with the quote "Call me Trimtab"

Designer Buckminster Fuller is often cited for his use of trim tabs as a metaphor for leadership and personal empowerment. In the February 1972 issue of Playboy, Fuller said:

Something hit me very hard once, thinking about what one little man could do. Think of the Queen Mary—the whole ship goes by and then comes the rudder. And there's a tiny thing at the edge of the rudder called a trim tab.

It's a miniature rudder. Just moving the little trim tab builds a low pressure that pulls the rudder around. Takes almost no effort at all. So I said that the little individual can be a trim tab. Society thinks it's going right by you, that it's left you altogether. But if you're doing dynamic things mentally, the fact is that you can just put your foot out like that and the whole big ship of state is going to go.

So I said, call me Trim Tab.

— Buckminster Fuller

The official newsletter of the Buckminster Fuller Institute is called Trimtab.

Fuller's metaphor received considerable media attention in January 2019 when actor Jeff Bridges employed it in his Cecil B. DeMille Award acceptance speech at the 76th Golden Globes:

Bucky made the analogy that a trim tab is an example of how the individual is connected to society and how we affect society. And I like to think of myself as a trim tab. All of us are trim tabs. We might seem like we’re not up to the task, but we are, man. We’re alive! We can make a difference! We can turn this ship in the way we wanna go, man!

== See also ==
- Servo tab
