= Anton Flettner =

German-American aviation engineer and inventor (1885–1961)

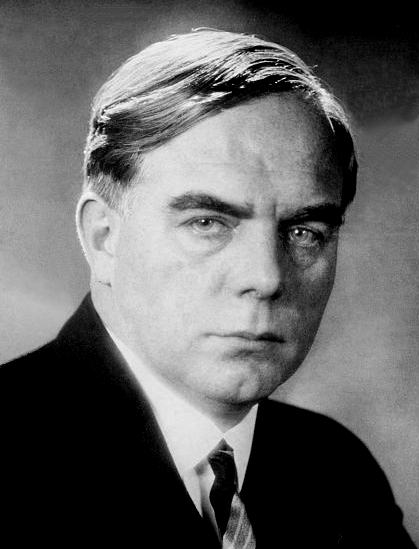
- Anton Flettner
- Born: 1 November 1885; Hattersheim am Main, Germany
- Died: 29 December 1961 (aged 76); New York City, US
- Engineering career
- Discipline: Aviation Engineer, Inventor
- Projects: Helicopters, Rotor Ships

Anton Flettner (1 November 1885 – 29 December 1961) was a German-American aviation engineer and inventor. Born in Eddersheim (today a district of Hattersheim am Main), Flettner made important contributions to airplane, helicopter, vessel, and automobile designs.

Having served Germany in both World Wars, Flettner emigrated to the United States after World War II as a consultant to the office of Naval Research at the United States Navy.

Flettner attended the Fulda State Teachers College in Fulda, Germany. He was the village teacher in Pfaffenwiesbach from 1906 to 1909. Flettner subsequently taught high school mathematics and physics in Frankfurt, where he developed ideas that would assist Germany in World War I.

Flettner developed a new method of harnessing the wind: the Flettner rotor ship. It could permit ocean liners to reduce their crews by two-thirds and save 90 percent in fuel.

== World War I ==
From 1914 to 1918 Anton Flettner worked at the German Ministry for War in the development of remote controls for air, water, and land vehicles. While employed under the aegis of Graf Zeppelin, Flettner also developed pilotless aircraft projects.

At the age of 29, Flettner presented his first invention, a steerable torpedo, to the Kaiserliche Marine (German Imperial Navy) of World War I. This, and his next invention, a remote-controlled combat car, which was presented to the Deutsches Heer (German Army), were rejected because they were not considered to be technically feasible. However, Flettner's efforts culminated in the prototype Siemens-Schuckertwerke 1000 kg wire guided air to surface missile of 1918.

During World War I, Flettner developed the servo tab / anti-servo tab. The servo tab evolved into the "trim tab" which is still in use on all airplanes and many large vessels. Trim tabs are extremely useful in moving large rudders on vessels with vastly reduced power.

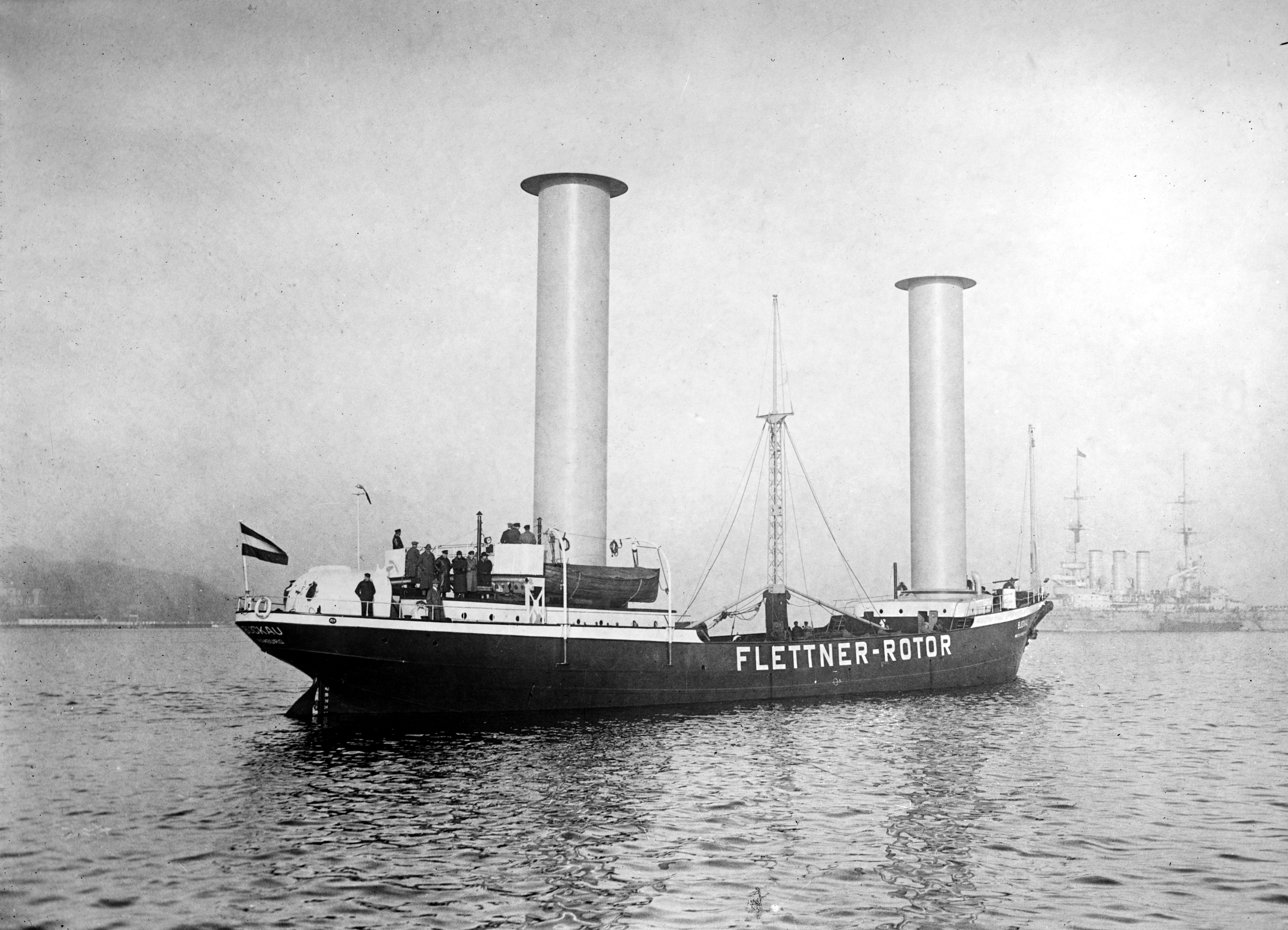
The Flettner rotor ship Buckau

== Savonius collaboration ==
In 1923, Finnish architect Sigurd Johannes Savonius took interest in Flettner's rotor ship, and the two began a collaboration. By the next year, the architect had invented the Savonius wind turbine, and by 1930 had patented a ventilation device based on the wind turbine. The patent was later acquired by Flettner's firm Flettner Ventilator Limited, which still manufactures modern versions of the device in Britain. It has been widely used on buses, vans, boats, railroad cars, campervans, and trucks to assist cooling in warm weather.

== Other post-World-War-I work ==
Following World War I, Flettner was named managing director of the Institute for Aero and Hydro Dynamics in Amsterdam. He held that post until 1931.

With assistance from German physicist Albert Betz, Swiss aeronautical engineer Jakob Ackeret, German engineer Ludwig Prandtl and German theoretical physicist Albert Einstein, Anton Flettner constructed an experimental rotor vessel, the Buckau, later renamed the Baden-Baden, in October 1924 at the Friedrich Krupp Germaniawerft. The Buckau was a schooner refitted with two rotating 50-foot cylinders and was the first vessel built with a propulsion system based on the Magnus effect. Flettner came upon the idea while at the beach with his wife. Flettner used sand, flowing over his rotating hand, to describe the Magnus effect and realized its potential for sail propulsion. The Baden-Baden crossed the Atlantic in 1926. It could outsail normal schooners under moderate to heavy winds, but was destroyed by a storm in 1931. A commercial rotor ship, the Barbara, was also built, and sailed to the United States.

In 1926, Anton Flettner shifted his focus to aviation in founding his own company, the Flettner Flugzeugbau GmbH in Berlin, aiming at the application of the Flettner-rotor as a wing replacement on large wind turbines. In 1935, Flettner built a German night reconnaissance and anti-submarine autogyro called the Fl 184. Flettner followed this accomplishment by building the Flettner Fl 185 in 1936, an experimental German gyrodyne, which could fly as both a helicopter and as a gyroplane.

In 1938 Flettner, together with Kurt Hohenemser, built the Flettner Fl 265. The Flettner Fl 265 as the likely pioneering example of a twin-lift rotor synchropter, addressed the problem of torque compensation as the first helicopter with intermeshing rotors (Flettner double rotor).

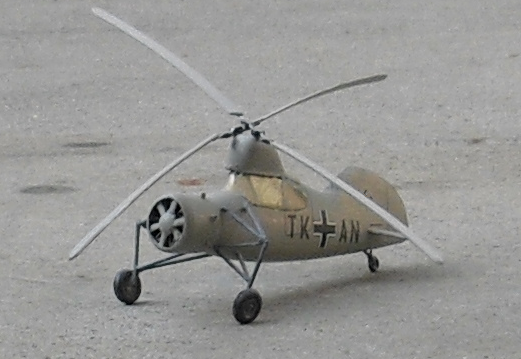
Flettner Fl 265 model

== World War II ==
During World War II, Anton Flettner headed Flettner Flugzeugbau GmbH, which specialized in reconnaissance helicopters for the German Luftwaffe (Air Force).

Flettner's helicopter inventions were financed from wealth acquired from his ventilator business, a company that was enhanced by the skill of his wife, Lydia Freudenberg Flettner. Anton Flettner built his helicopters for the German military, primarily for navy spotter use. Although his wife was Jewish, he held a personal relationship with the head of gestapo, Heinrich Himmler. Himmler had Flettner's wife and family escorted safely to Sweden for the duration of the war. Anton Flettner's partner and confidant was Kurt Hohenemser, a brilliant and thorough engineer who developed the details necessary for the success of Flettner's helicopters. Hohenemser's father was also Jewish, yet both remained unharmed during their tenure together throughout the war as they worked to develop the helicopter for military use.

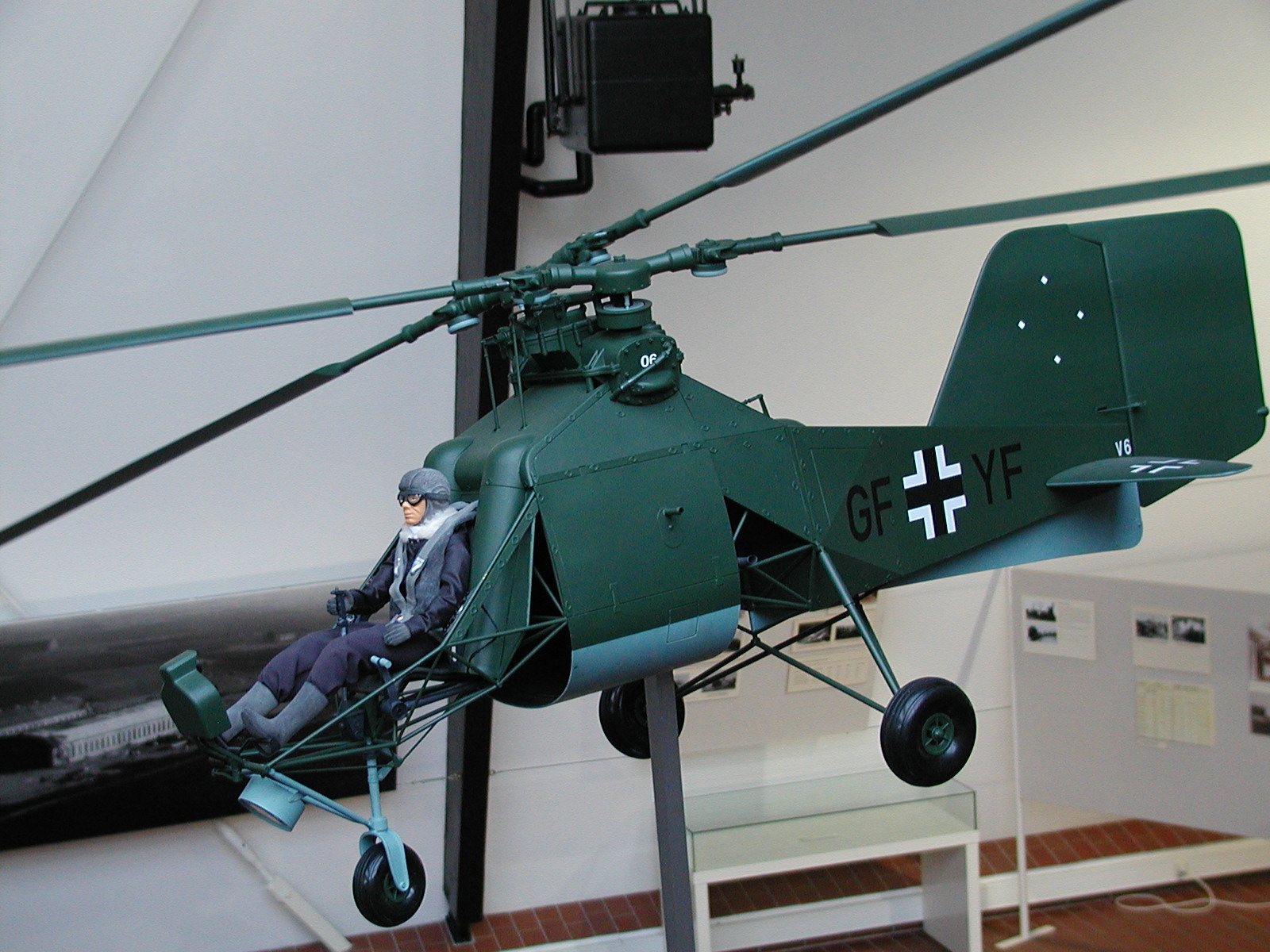
Flettner Fl 282 "Kolibri" was an early variant of helicopter using two intermeshing rotors

While the final product, the Flettner Fl 282 Kolibri ("Hummingbird"), could be factory-assembled, Flettner and Hohenemser insisted that they were the only ones who were capable of assembling the complex intermeshing rotor gearbox assembly. Plans for mass production of 1,000 Flettner Fl 282 helicopters by BMW were disrupted when allied forces bombed the designated factory.

At least two other Flettner helicopters were under development when World War II ended. They were the Flettner Fl 285, another reconnaissance helicopter with a two-hour flight limit and capacity to carry two small bombs, and the Flettner Fl 339, a large transport helicopter project designed for approximately 20 passengers.

== Photo gallery ==
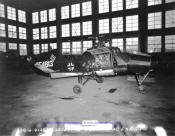
Flettner Fl 282 Kolibri helicopter

Letter from Dr. Hohenemser regarding his association with Anton Flettner (page 1 of 2)

Letter from Dr. Hohenemser regarding his association with Anton Flettner (page 2 of 2)

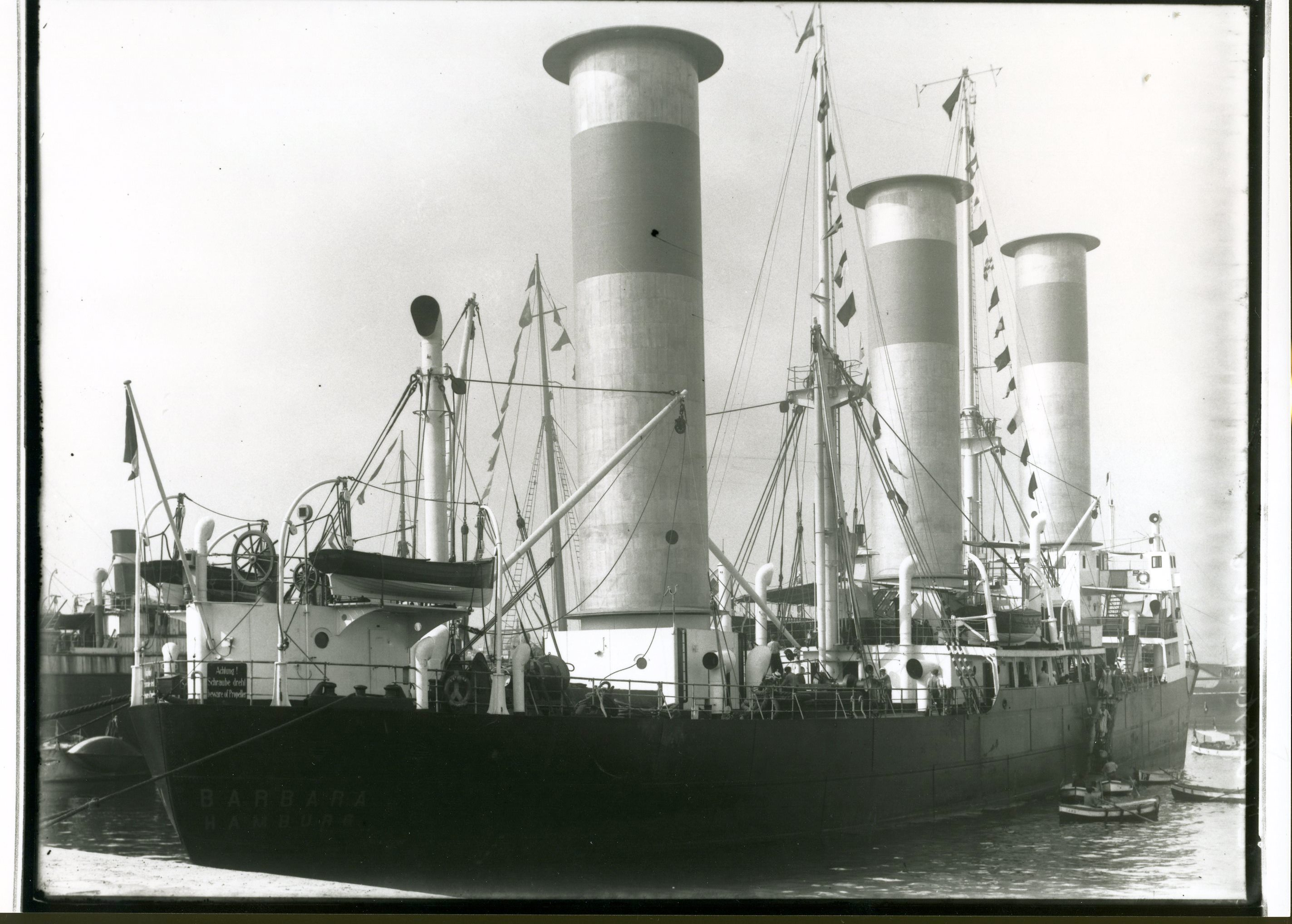
The rotor ship "Barbara"

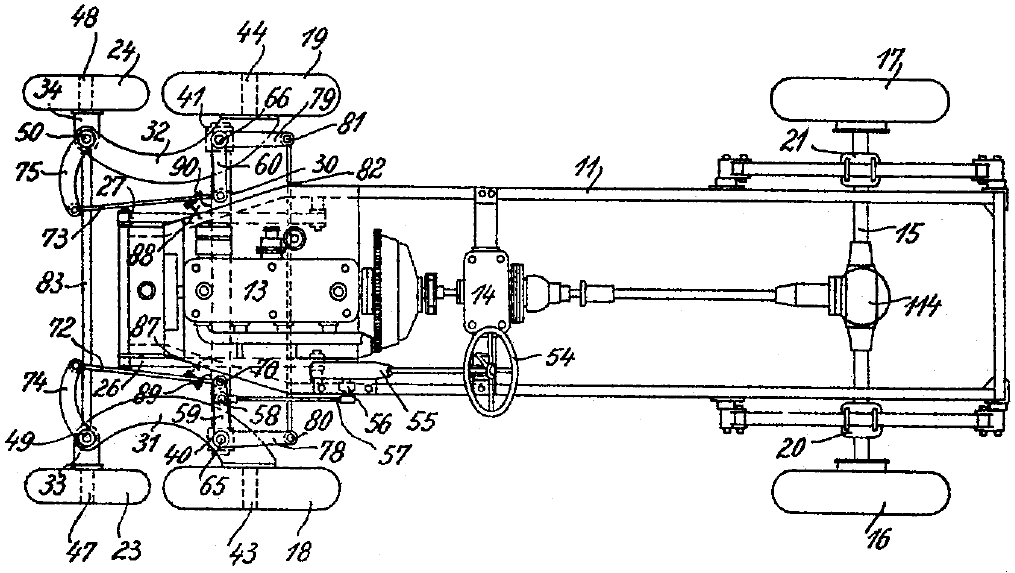
Flettner's patent to a steering mechanism

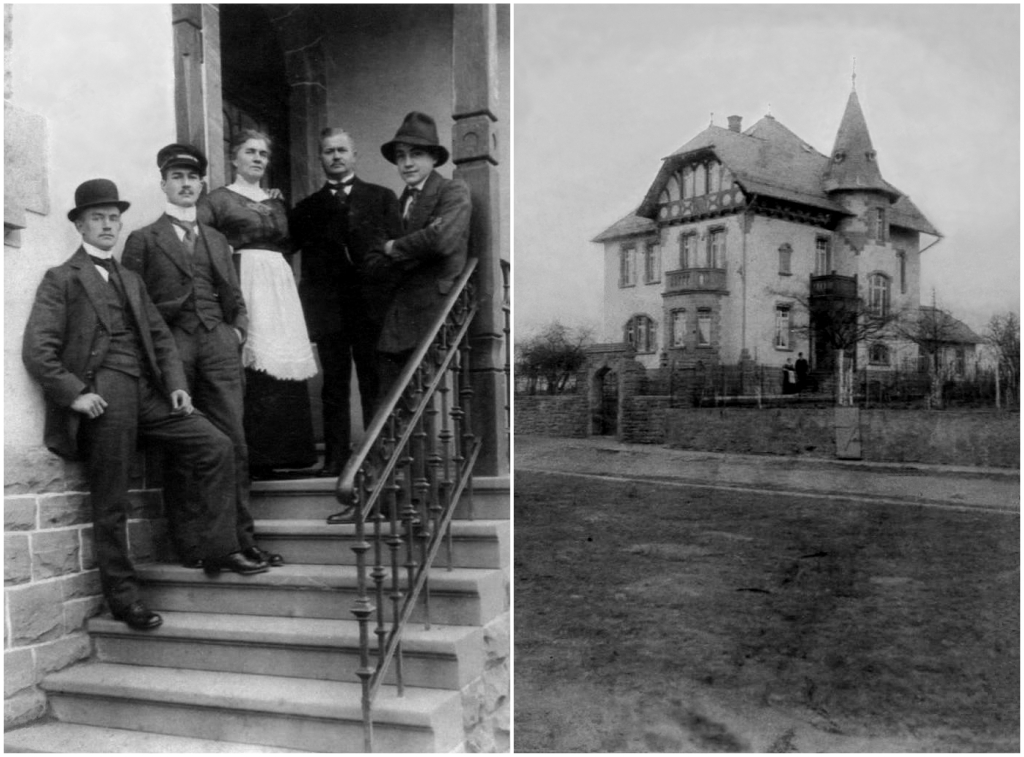
Flettner's boyhood home in Eddersheim, Germany. Anton Flettner is on the far right.

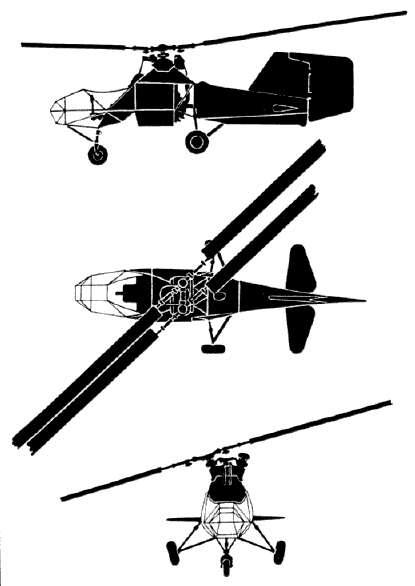
Flettner Fl 282 Kolibri

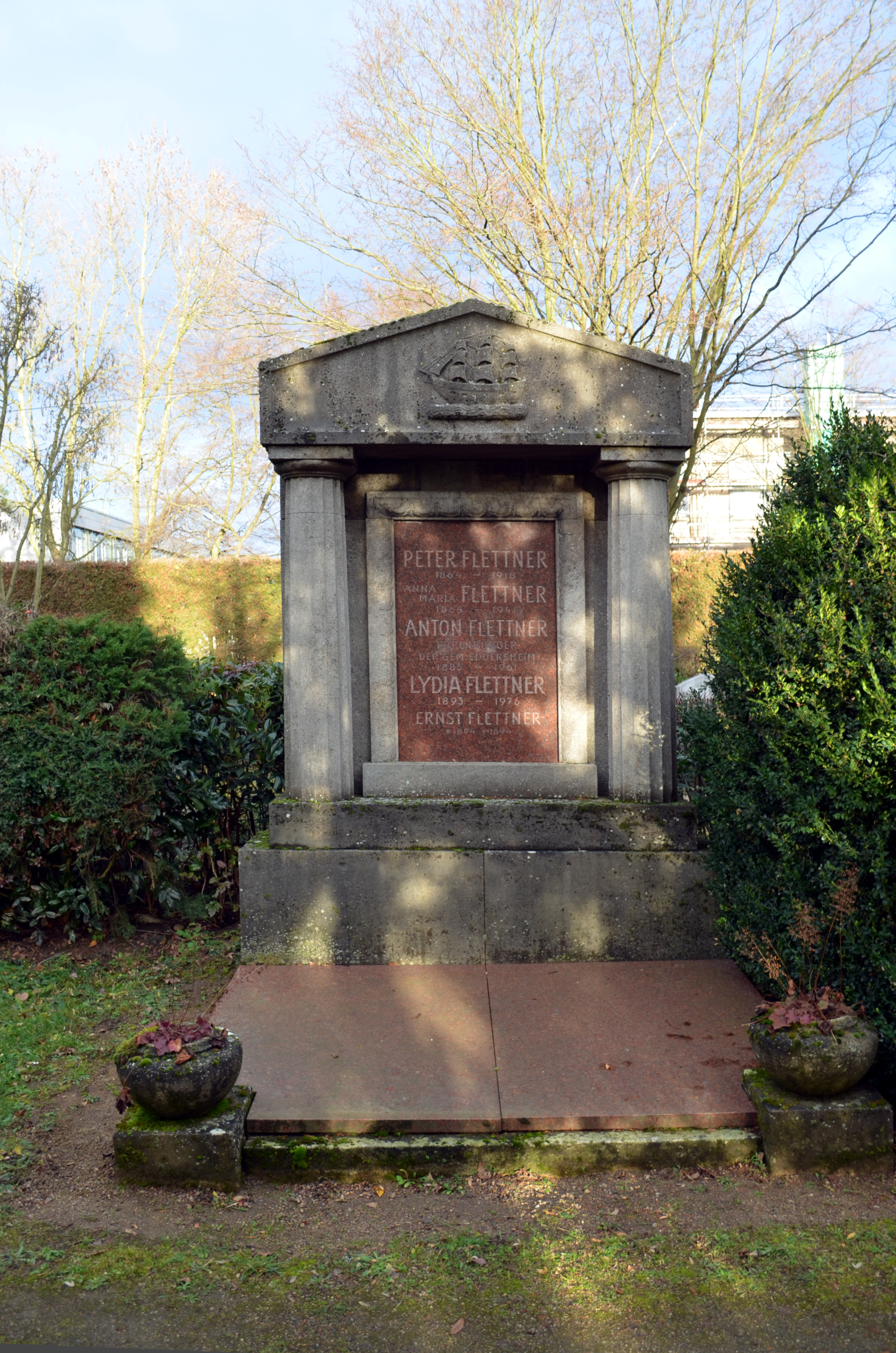
Tomb of Anton Flettner

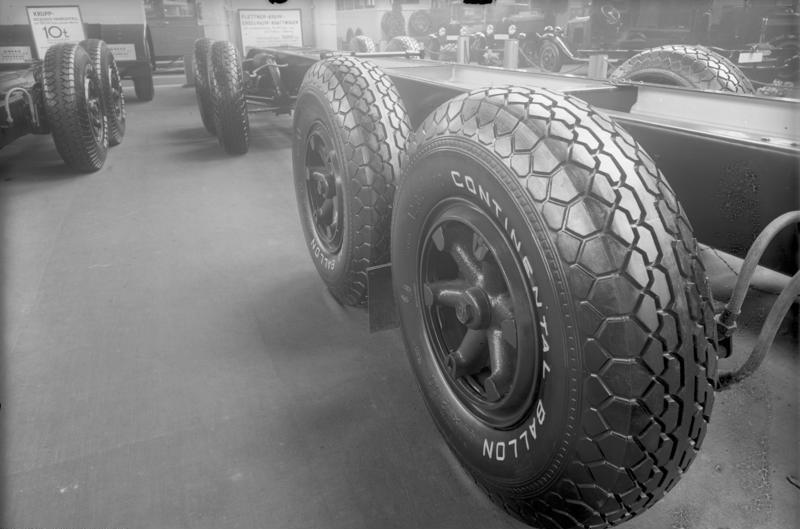
1931 photo of the Flettner-Krupp-Grosskraftwagen, the largest German truck at 14 m long, with a payload capacity of 15 tons, powered by a 147 hp engine.

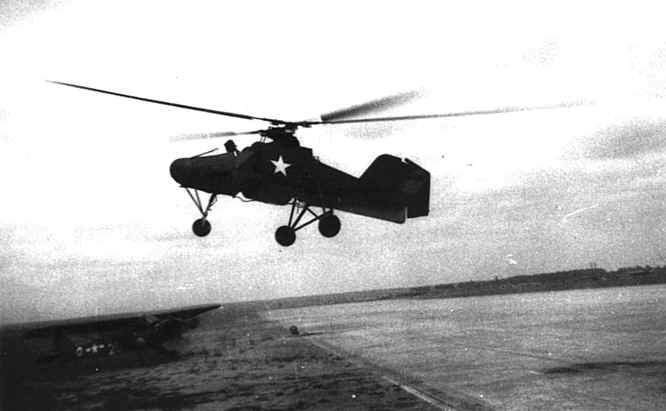
Flettner Fl 282 during flight trials after World War II, with US markings

== Post World War II ==
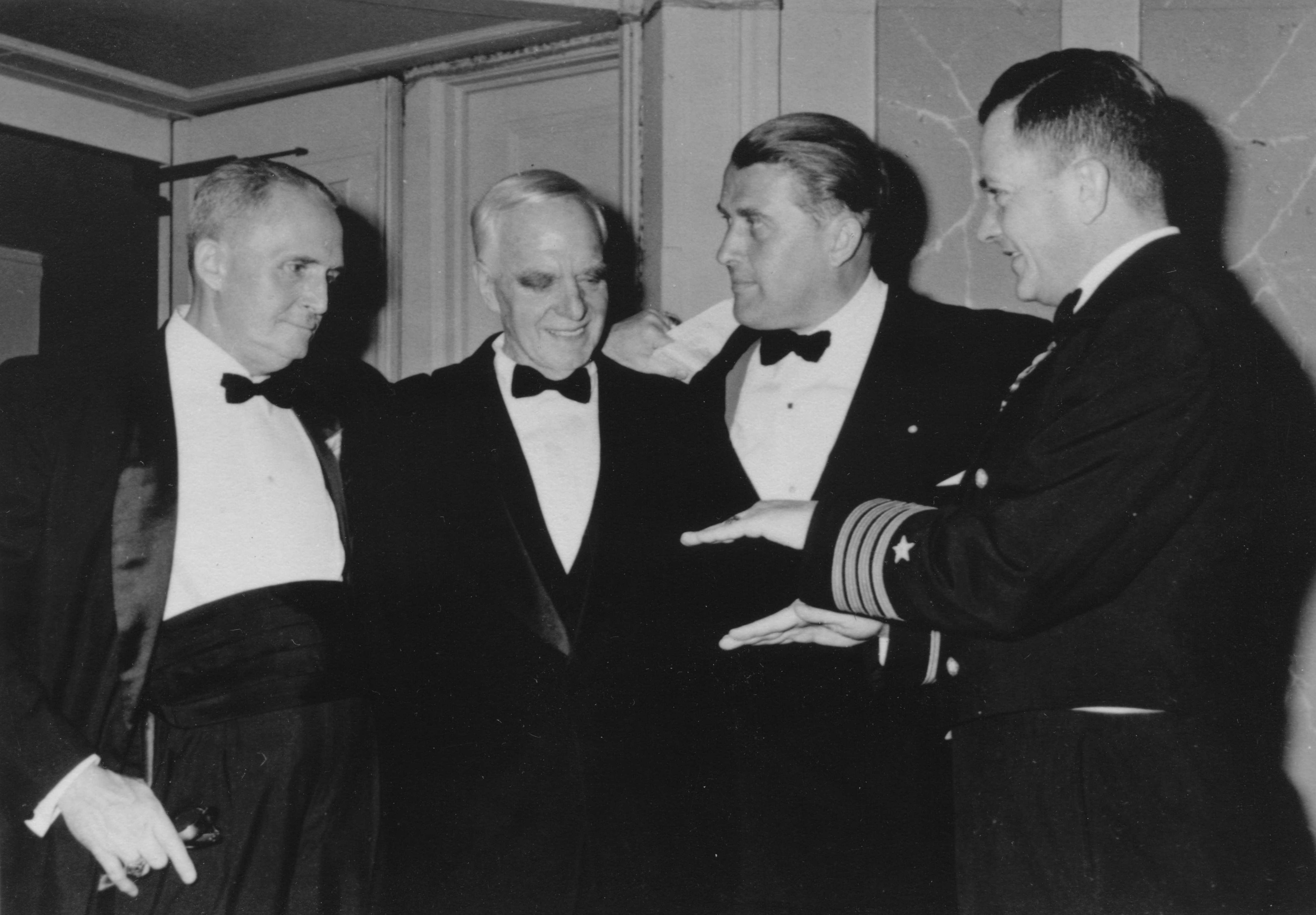
Flettner meets Wernher von Braun

Upon the war's conclusion, Anton Flettner was held in the "Dustbin" interrogation camp at Kransberg Castle. After 1945, Flettner, along with many other aviation pioneers, was brought to the United States as part of Operation Paperclip. Flettner and his partner, Kurt Hohenemser, were among the first German emigrants into the United States after World War II.

Flettner started Flettner Aircraft Corporation, which developed helicopters for the U.S. military. In 1949. Flettner and Kurt Hohenemser, who together developed numerous patents in Germany, kept in close contact after both men emigrated to the United States.

Flettner's company in the U.S. was not commercially successful, but his work was shared with the US Army Air Forces. Throughout his 14 years in the United States, Flettner was active in carrying out research projects for the US Army, US Air Force, and the US Navy.

Contrary to popular belief, Anton Flettner never worked for Kaman and has no connection to any helicopters built by the company. Flettner founded his own company, Flettner Aircraft, in the USA and spent the rest of his life trying to solve the problem of helicopter main gearbox life, but to no avail.

Today the Flettner rotor is in operation as a supplemental propulsion system for transport and research vessels. There are two ships utilizing the concept of the Flettner rotor in a modified form, the turbosail Acyone developed by Jacques-Yves Cousteau in 1985 and the E-Ship 1, a cargo ship that made its first voyage in 2010. Albert Einstein praised the Flettner Rotor ship as having great practical importance.

Anton Flettner's colleague and former partner, Kurt Hohenemser, worked his remaining years in the United States to prove Flettner's idea that properly designed flexible helicopter-type rotors are more suitable for producing electricity from the wind than rigid airplane-type rotors. An offshore wind energy project announced in February 2017, involving Seawind Ocean Technology B.V., aims to demonstrate the wind energy applications put forth by Anton Flettner, Kurt Hohenemser, and Glidden Doman in harsh wind and sea conditions.

Anton Flettner died at age 76 in New York City on December 29, 1961. Among his many distinctions, Anton Flettner was an honorary member of the American Helicopter Society and the Convertible Aircraft Pioneers. Flettner's birthplace home and tomb are national historic protected monuments in Germany.

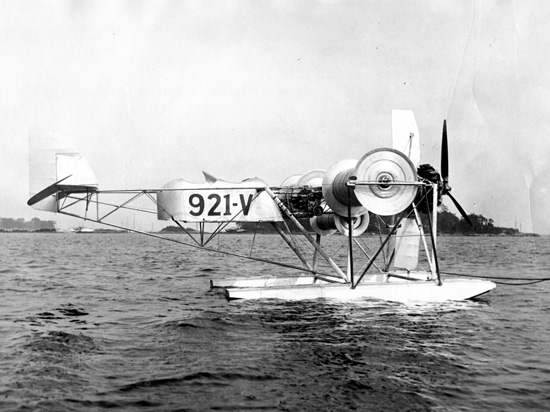
A Flettner rotor aircraft (the Plymouth A-A-2004)

== Aircraft built by Flettner Flugzeugbau GmbH ==
- Flettner Fl 184
- Flettner Fl 185
- Flettner Fl 265
- Flettner Fl 282
- Flettner Fl 285
- Flettner Fl 339

== See also ==
- Autogyros
- Flettner ship, a schooner that derives its thrust using the Magnus effect
- Flettner airplane, an airplane that derives its lift using the Magnus effect
- Flettner Fl 184 helicopter-gyroplane hybrid
- Flettner Fl 185 helicopter
- Flettner Fl 265 helicopter
- Flettner Fl 282 "Kolibri" helicopter
- Gyrodynes and Heliplanes
- Charles Kaman
