= Flettner Fl 282 =

Helicopter in Nazi Germany

Fl 282 Kolibri
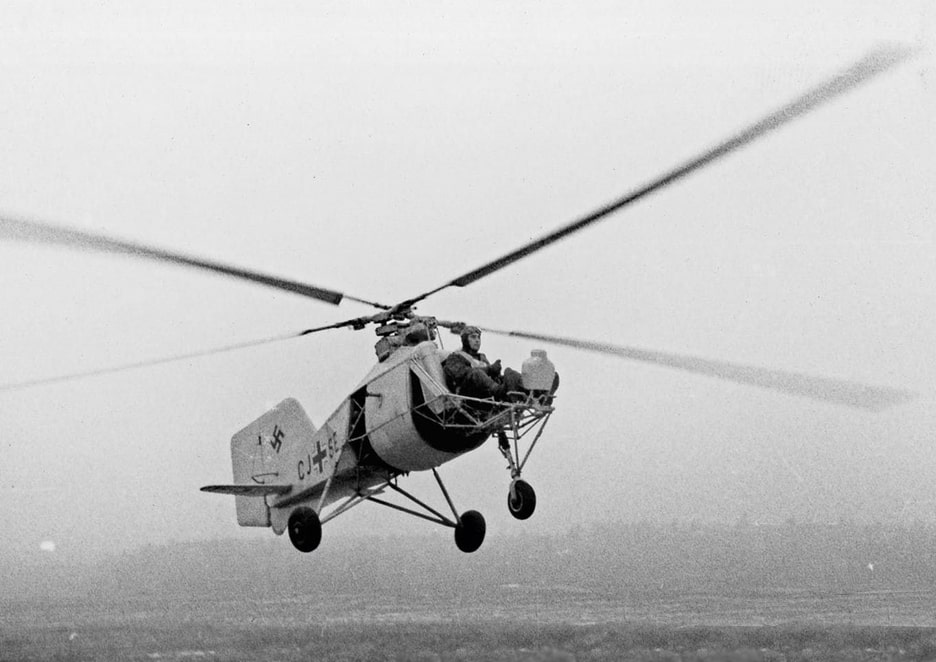
- Flettner Fl 282 on approach

General information
- Type: Helicopter
- Manufacturer: Anton Flettner, Flugzeugbau GmbH
- Primary user: Luftwaffe
- Number built: 24

History
- Introduction date: 1942
- First flight: 1941
- Retired: 1945

The Flettner Fl 282 Kolibri (Hummingbird) is a single-seat intermeshing rotor helicopter, or synchropter, produced by Anton Flettner of Germany. According to Yves Le Bec, the Flettner Fl 282 was the world's first series production helicopter.

== Design and development ==
The Fl 282 Kolibri was an improved version of the Flettner Fl 265 announced in July 1940, which pioneered the same intermeshing rotor configuration that the Kolibri used. It had a 7.7 litre displacement, seven-cylinder Siemens-Halske Sh 14 radial engine of 110–120 kW (150–160 hp) mounted in the center of the fuselage, with a transmission mounted on the front of the engine from which a drive shaft ran to an upper gearbox, which then split the power to a pair of opposite-rotation drive shafts to turn the rotors.

The Sh 14 engine was a venerable, tried-and-true design with low specific power output and low power/weight ratio (20.28 hp/L, 0.54 hp/lb) which could (anecdotally) run for up to 400 hours without major servicing, as opposed to the more powerful 27 litre displacement, nine-cylinder BMW/Bramo Fafnir 750 hp radial engine powering the larger Focke Achgelis Fa 223 helicopter, whose higher output (27.78 hp/L, 0.62 hp/lb), more modern design required moderate maintenance as often as every 25 hours (such as changing spark plugs, etc., well within the norm for modern radial engines of that era). While such a heavy and low-powered engine would work well in a very small craft like the Fi 282, to try to scale it up and use an engine of equivalent power/weight ratio in the 700-1000 hp class would result in a massive and heavy engine leaving little excess capacity for cargo or passengers. 750 hp was the lowest rating that the Fafnir was available in - indeed, it was a low-power, low maintenance design compared with many other engines of this era. The Fl 282's fuselage was constructed from steel tube covered with doped fabric, and it was fitted with a fixed tricycle undercarriage.

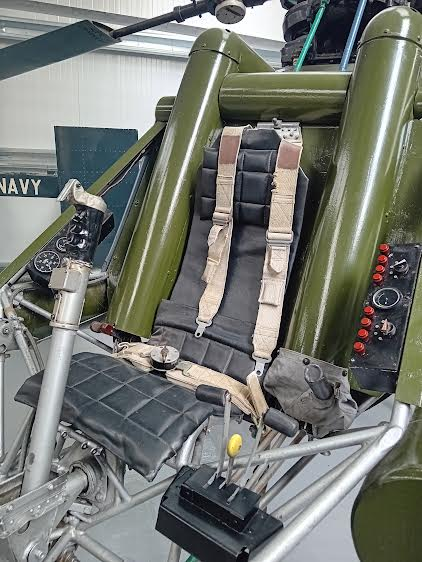
The cockpit of the surviving example at the Midland Air Museum

The German Navy was impressed with the Kolibri and wanted to evaluate it for submarine spotting duties, ordering an initial 15 examples, to be followed by 30 production models. Flight testing of the first two prototypes was carried out through 1941, including repeated takeoffs and landings from a pad mounted on the German cruiser Köln.

The first two "A" series prototypes had enclosed cockpits; all subsequent examples had open cockpits and were designated "B" series.

In case of an engine failure, the switch from helicopter to autorotation was automatic.

Three-bladed rotors were installed on a test bed and found smoother than the vibrating 2-blade rotor, but the concept was not pursued further. The hover efficiency ("Figure of Merit") was 0.72 whereas for modern helicopters it is around 60%.

Intermeshing rotors were not used on a mass production helicopter until after World War II.

== Operational history ==
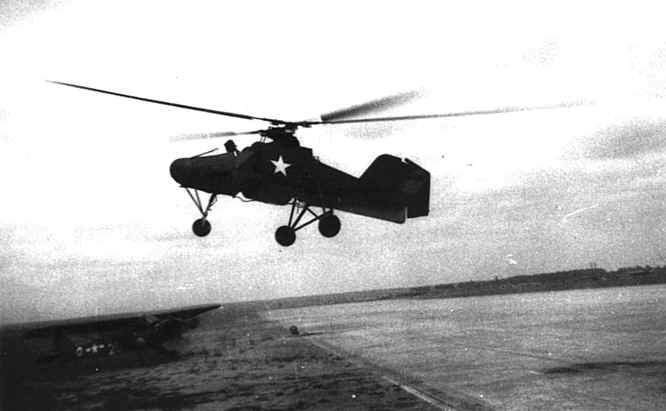
Flettner Fl 282 during flight trials after World War II, with US markings

Intended roles of Fl 282 included ferrying items between ships and reconnaissance. However, as the war progressed, the Luftwaffe began considering converting the Fl 282 for battlefield use. Until this time the craft had been flown by a single pilot, but by then a position for an observer was added at the very rear of the craft, resulting in the B-2 version. Later the B-2 proved a useful artillery spotting aircraft and an observation unit was established in 1945 comprising three Fl 282 and three Fa 223 helicopters.

Good handling in bad weather led the German Air Ministry to issue a contract in 1944 to BMW to produce 1,000 units. However, the company's Munich plant was destroyed by Allied bombing raids after producing just 24 machines.

Towards the end of World War II most of the surviving Fl 282s were stationed at Rangsdorf, in their role as artillery spotters, but gradually fell victim to Soviet fighters and anti-aircraft fire.

== Variants ==
Fl 282 V1/7
Prototypes.
Fl 282A-1
Single-seat naval reconnaissance type, for operation from cruisers and other warships. Tested in the Baltic, Mediterranean and Aegean Seas.
Fl 282A-2
Single-seat reconnaissance type for submarines equipped with special deck hangar, project only.
Fl 282B-1/B-2
Two-seat land reconnaissance-liaison helicopter

== Operators ==
Germany

- Luftwaffe

== Surviving aircraft ==
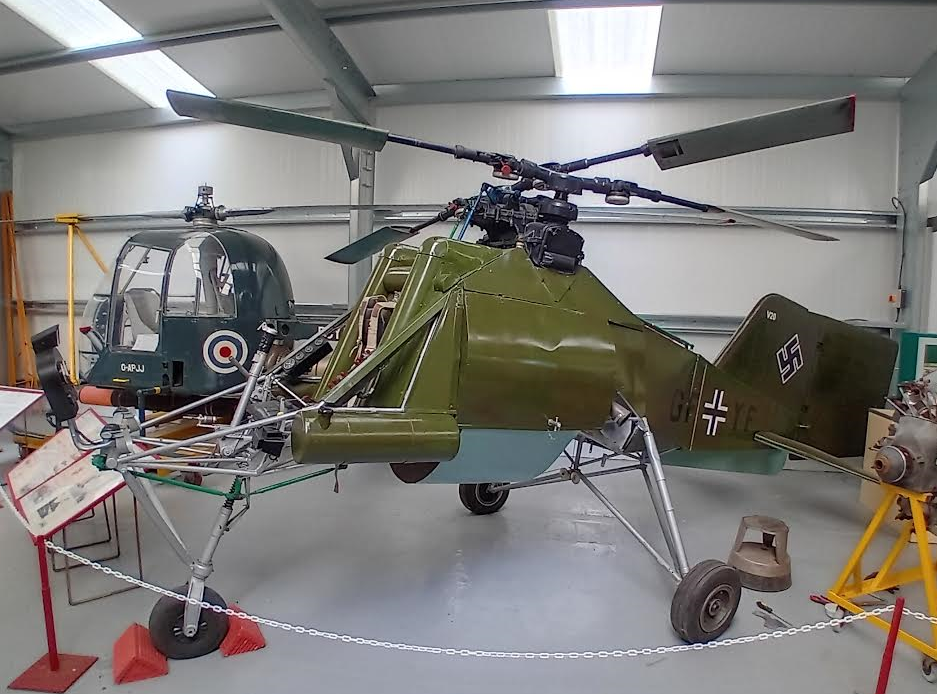
Fl 282 V-10 28368

- A single Fl 282 was captured at Rangsdorf by Soviet forces
- Two, which had been assigned to Transportstaffel 40 (TS/40), the Luftwaffe's only operational helicopter squadron, at Mühldorf, Bavaria, were captured by U.S. forces.

Fl 282 V-10 28368 Midland Air Museum, Coventry, England. Partial aircraft, frame with rotor head & wheels.
Fl 282 V-23 was at one time to be found at the National Museum of the United States Air Force, Dayton, Ohio, US. The Smithsonian has the rotor heads and transmission of the V-12 model. The V23 was loaned to Prewitt Aircraft but subsequently disappeared. Reports decades later of being seen in a barn but never verified. According to the Research Division at the National Museum of the US Airforce, Flettner Fl-282, T2-4613, was acquired by the museum on 12 August 1949. After many years in storage this aircraft was placed on loan to Sampson Air Force Base, New York, US on 23 June 1954. When Sampson AFB closed in the summer of 1956, all items then on exhibit were returned to the museum or disposed of in place. The aircraft was not returned from Sampson AFB and information indicates it was de-accessioned on 29 May 1957. Unfortunately, the method of disposal is not documented in existing records. To the museum's knowledge the aircraft was most likely scrapped at Sampson AFB as no public record of its current disposition has been located.

== Specifications (Fl 282 V21) ==
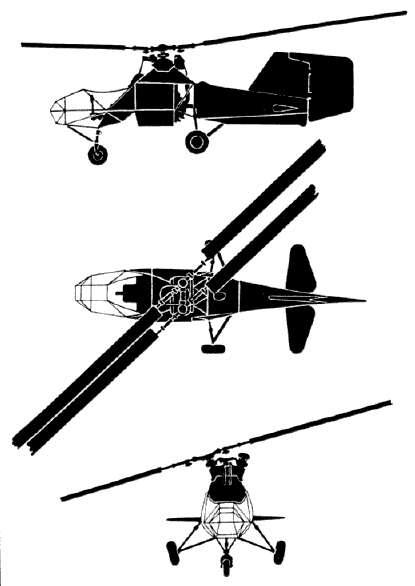
Fl 282

Data from

General characteristics

- Crew: 1
- Length: 6.56 m (21 ft 6 in)
- Height: 2.2 m (7 ft 3 in)
- Empty weight: 760 kg (1,676 lb)
- Max takeoff weight: 1,000 kg (2,205 lb)
- Powerplant: 1 × Bramo Sh.14A 7-cyl. air-cooled radial piston engine, 119 kW (160 hp)
- Main rotor diameter: 2 × 11.96 m (39 ft 3 in)
- Main rotor area: 224.69 m^{2} (2,418.5 sq ft)

Performance

- Maximum speed: 150 km/h (93 mph, 81 kn) at sea level
- Range: 170 km (110 mi, 92 nmi)
- Service ceiling: 3,300 m (10,800 ft)
- Hover ceiling: 300 m (984 ft)
- Rate of climb: 1.52 m/s (299 ft/min)
- Rotor loading: 8.84 kg/m2 (1.81 lb/sqft)

== See also ==
- Kaman Huskie
- Kaman K-MAX

Related development

- Flettner Fl 265

Aircraft of comparable role, configuration, and era

- Focke Achgelis Fa 61
- Focke Achgelis Fa 223
- Kaman K-225
- Sikorsky R-4

Related lists

- List of single seat helicopters

== Bibliography ==
- Coates, Steve and Jean-Christophe Carbonel. Helicopters of the Third Reich. Crowborough, UK: Classic Publications Ltd., 2002. ISBN 1-903223-24-5.
- Donald, David, ed. The Complete Encyclopedia of World Aircraft. New York: Barnes & Noble Books, 1997. ISBN 0-7607-0592-5.
- Jackson, Robert, ed. "Flettner FL 282 Kolibri." Helicopters: Military, Civilian, and Rescue Rotorcraft (The Aviation Factfile). London: Grange Books Ltd, 2005. ISBN 1-84013-812-2.
- Munson, Kenneth (1978). German Aircraft Of World War 2 in colour. Poole, Dorsett, UK: Blandford Press. ISBN 0-7137-0860-3.
- Nowarra, Heinz J. German Helicopters, 1928-1945. Atglen, Pennsylvania: Schiffer Publishing, 1990. ISBN 0-88740-289-5.
- Smith, J.R.; Anthony L. Kay (1990). German Aircraft of the Second World War (2nd ed.). London: Putnam & Company Ltd. ISBN 0-370-00024-2.
- Witkowski, Ryszard. Rotorcraft of the Third Reich. Redbourn, UK: Mushroom Model Publications, 2007. ISBN 978-83-89450-43-2.
