= Servo tab =

Device on aircraft control surface

Servo tab

A servo tab is a small hinged device installed on an aircraft control surface to assist the movement of the control surfaces. Introduced by the German firm Flettner, servo tabs were formerly known as Flettner tabs. Servo tabs are not true servomechanisms, as they do not employ negative feedback to keep the control surfaces in a desired position; they only provide a mechanical advantage to the pilot.

== Servo tabs ==
A servo tab, or balance tab, moves in the direction opposite to the desired movement of the control surface. It deflects airflow, generating force on the whole control surface in the desired direction. The tab has a leverage advantage, being located well aft of the control surface hinge line, and thus its airflow deflection moves the control surface in the opposite direction, overcoming the resistance generated by the airflow deflection of the control surface. This has the effect of reducing the control force required from the pilot to move the controls.

In some large aircraft, the servo tab is the only control that is connected to the pilot's stick or wheel, as in the Bristol Britannia and its Canadian derivatives. The pilot moves the wheel, which moves the servo tab; the servo tab with its mechanical advantage moves the elevator or aileron, which is otherwise free-floating. With the "geared spring tab" variant, a pilot is able "to maneuver a vehicle weighing as much as 300,000 pounds flying at an airspeed of 300 miles per hour or more".

== Anti-servo tabs ==
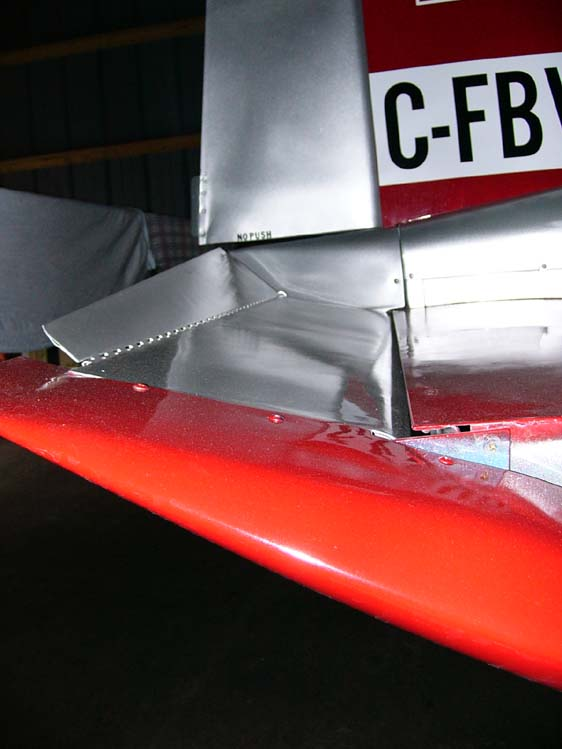
An anti-servo tab on the elevator of an American Aviation AA-1 Yankee

An anti-servo tab, or anti-balance tab, works in the opposite way to a servo tab. It deploys in the same direction as the control surface, making the movement of the control surface more difficult and requires more force applied to the controls by the pilot. This may seem counter-productive, but it is commonly used on aircraft where the controls are too light. The anti-servo tab serves to make the controls feel heavier to the pilot, and also to increase the stability of that control surface. It is also used where the aircraft requires additional stability in that axis of movement.

Anti-servo tabs are particularly found on stabilators, which must have some method of decreasing their sensitivity.

== Incorporation of trim tab functionality ==
A servo or anti-servo tab may also function as a trim tab, to relieve control pressure and maintain the control surface in the desired position. This obviates the need for a second device for trimming, which would increase drag.

Anti-servo trim tabs are particularly found on stabilators, but are also found on other control surfaces. The Beechcraft RC-12 Guardrail uses a rudder trim tab which incorporates anti-servo action, and the Beechcraft U-21 uses elevator and aileron trim tabs which incorporate anti-servo action.

== See also ==
- Trim tab
- Nolder
- Balanced rudder § Aircraft
