= Flettner Fl 185 =

1936 experimental Nazi German gyrodyne

Fl 185
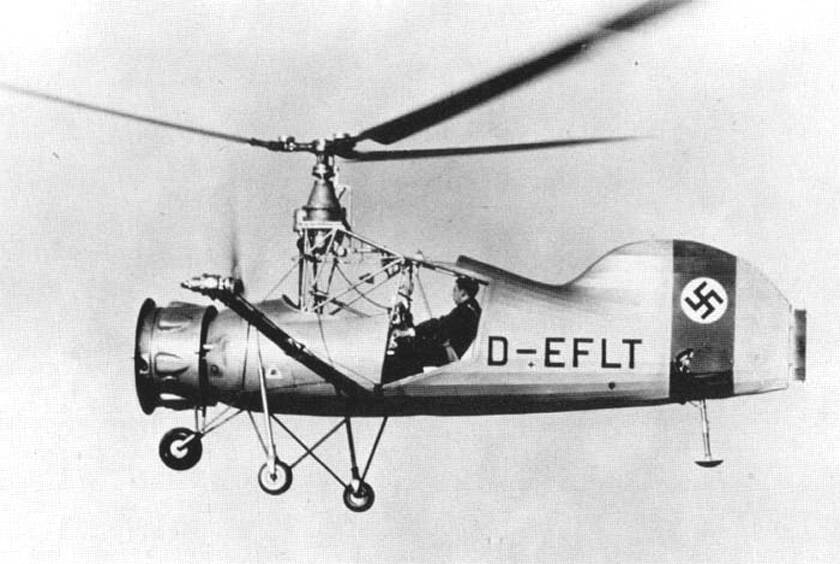

General information
- Type: Autogyro/helicopter
- Manufacturer: Flettner
- Designer: Anton Flettner
- Number built: 1

History
- First flight: 1936

The Flettner Fl 185 was an experimental Nazi German gyrodyne developed by Anton Flettner. It was unique in its operation, which could fly both as a helicopter and as a gyroplane.

== Design and development ==
This aircraft was developed in 1936 with support of the Kriegsmarine. It was powered by a 160 horsepower (120 kW) BMW-Bramo Sh 14 A radial piston engine with forced-air cooling, mounted at the nose. The engine drove a 12 m diameter main rotor and two auxiliary propellers mounted on outriggers attached to the fuselage.

At take-off or when hovering, the auxiliary propellers worked in opposition to each other and served to cancel the torque of the main rotor, a function handled by a single, variable-pitch tail rotor on contemporary helicopters. In forward flight, however, both propellers worked to provide forward thrust while the rotor autorotated, as in a twin-engined autogyro. The landing gear consisted of a nose-wheel, two smaller stabilising wheels under the outriggers and a tail skid. Only one prototype was constructed.

== Specifications (Fl 185) ==
Data from

General characteristics

- Powerplant: 1 × Bramo 314C 7-cyl air-cooled radial piston engine, 110 kW (150 hp)
- Main rotor diameter: 1 3-bladed × 12 m (39 ft 4 in)
- Main rotor area: 113.112 m^{2} (1,217.53 sq ft)
- Propellers: 2 x 2 bladed-bladed fixed-pitch wooden propellers

Performance

== See also ==
- Fairey FB-1 Gyrodyne
