= Flettner airplane =

Aircraft using a Flettner rotor

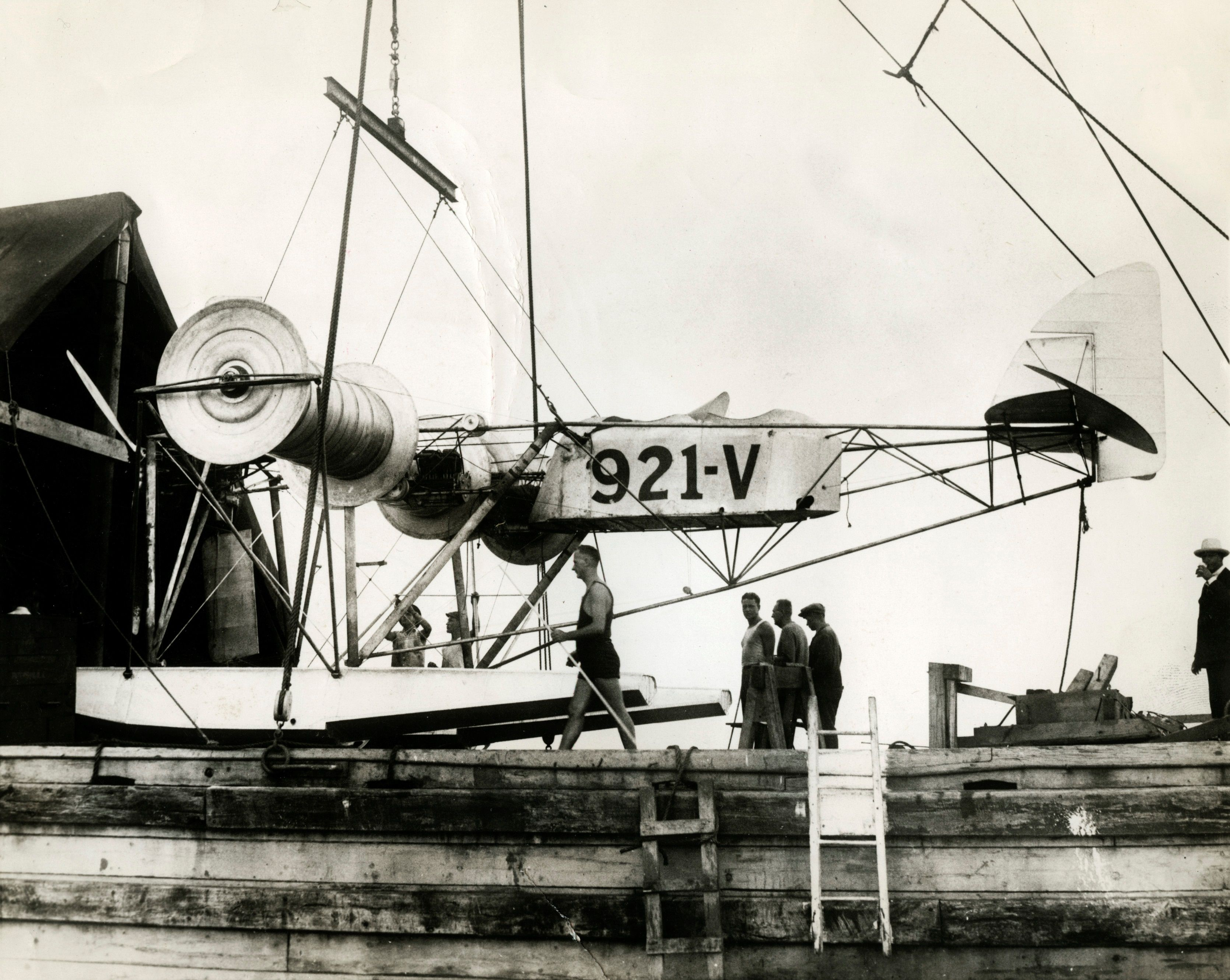
The Plymouth A-A-2004 rotor aircraft

A Flettner airplane is a type of rotor airplane which uses a Flettner rotor to provide lift. The rotor comprises a spinning cylinder with circular end plates and, in an aircraft, spins about a spanwise horizontal axis. When the aircraft moves forward, the Magnus effect creates lift.

Anton Flettner, after whom the rotor is named, used it successfully as the sails of a rotor ship. He also suggested its use as a wing for a rotor airplane.

The Butler Ames Aerocycle was built in 1910 and tested aboard a warship. There is no record of it having flown.

The Plymouth A-A-2004 was built for Zaparka in 1930 by three anonymous American inventors. It was reported to have made successful flights over Long Island Sound.

An inherent safety concern is that if power to the rotating drums were lost—even if thrust was maintained—the aircraft would lose its ability to generate lift as the drum slowed and it would not be able to sustain flight.

== See also ==
- Cyclogyro
- FanWing
- Servo tab

	Aerostat	Aerodyne		
	Lift: Lighter than air gas	Lift: Fixed wing	Lift: Unpowered rotor	Lift: Powered rotor
Unpowered free flight	(Free) balloon	Glider	Helicopter, etc. in autorotation	(None – see note 2)
Tethered (static or towed)	Tethered balloon	Kite	Rotor kite	(None – see note 2)
Powered	Airship	Airplane, ornithopter, etc.	Autogyro	Gyrodyne, helicopter
