= Rotor wing =

Rotating aerodynamic rotor or wing

A rotor wing is a lifting rotor or wing which spins to provide aerodynamic lift. In general, a rotor may spin about an axis which is aligned substantially either vertically or side-to-side (spanwise). All three classes have been studied for use as lifting rotors and several variations have been flown on full-size aircraft, although only the vertical-axis rotary wing has become widespread on rotorcraft such as the helicopter.

Some types provide lift at zero forward airspeed, allowing for vertical takeoff and landing (VTOL), as in the helicopter. Others, especially unpowered free-spinning types, require forward airspeed in the same manner as a fixed-wing aircraft, as in the autogyro. Many can also provide forward thrust if required.

== Types ==
Many ingenious ways have been devised to convert the spinning of a rotor into aerodynamic lift. The various types of such rotor wings may be classified according to the axis of the rotor. Types include:

Vertical-axis

- Conventional rotary wings as used by modern rotorcraft.

Spanwise horizontal-axis

- Wing rotor: an airfoil-section horizontal-axis rotor which creates the primary lift.
- Magnus rotor: a rotor which creates lift via the Magnus effect.
  - Flettner rotor: a smooth cylindrical Magnus rotor with disc end plates.
  - Thom rotor: a smooth spinning cylinder with multiple discs along the span.
- Cycloidal rotor or cyclorotor: a set of horizontal lifting aerofoils rotating around the rim of a supporting horizontal-axis rotor. (May be powered or unpowered.) An aircraft with a cycloidal rotor wing is called a cyclogyro. Some examples are hybrids comprising a cycloidal rotor around a central Magnus cylinder.
- Cross-flow fan: a slatted cylindrical fan in a shaped duct.

Longitudinal horizontal-axis

- Radial-lift rotor: a substantially fore-aft axis rotor which creates lift through cyclic pitch variation.
  - Self-propelling wing or Radial-lift rotor: a propeller or rotor with the rotation axis angled to the airflow to create a cyclic variation in pitch and hence a radial lift component.
  - Radial-lift propeller with cyclic pitch control: a propeller capable of generating a sideways lift component.

== Conventional rotary wings ==
Conventional rotorcraft have vertical-axis rotors. The main types include the helicopter with powered rotors providing both lift and thrust, and the autogyro with unpowered rotors providing lift only. There are also various hybrid types, especially the gyrodyne which has both a powered rotor and independent forward propulsion, and the stopped rotor in which the rotor stops spinning to act as a fixed wing in forward flight.

== Magnus rotors ==
When a spinning body passes through air at right angles to its axis of spin, it experiences a sideways force in the third dimension. This Magnus effect was first demonstrated on a spinning cylinder by Gustav Magnus in 1872. If the cylinder axis is aligned spanwise (side to side) then forward movement through the air generates lift. The rotating body does not need to be a cylinder and many related shapes have been studied.

=== Flettner rotor ===
The Flettner rotor comprises a Magnus cylinder with a disc endplate at each end. The American Plymouth A-A-2004 floatplane had Flettner rotors in place of the main wings and achieved short flights in 1924.

== Cross-flow fan ==
The cross-flow fan comprises an arrangement of blades running parallel to a central axis and aligned radially, with the fan partially or fully enclosed in a shaped duct. Due to the specific shaping, rotating the fan causes air to be drawn in at one end of the duct, passed across the fan and expelled at the other end.

The FanWing is a lifting rotor which uses this principle. It can both provide forward thrust by expelling air backwards and augment lift, even at very low airspeeds, by also drawing the air downwards. A prototype UAV was flown in 2007.

== Radial-lift rotors ==
During World War II Focke-Wulf proposed the Triebflügel, in which a tipjet-driven rotor wing is located around the fuselage waist. The proposed mode of operation was to land and take off as a tail-sitter, using the wing as a conventional rotor. The craft would then tilt over to horizontal flight and lift would be provided by cyclic pitch variation of the rotor wings, with the wing tip ramjets now angled to provide forward thrust.

A few years later the American Vought XF5U circular-winged fighter prototype was designed with large radial-lift propellers. These were angled upwards when the craft was on the ground, creating a cyclic variation in the blades' angle of attack or pitch when the craft was moving forwards. This cyclic variation induced a radial lifting component to the blades, when in the horizontal segment of rotation, which was intended to augment the wing lift. A prototype aircraft was completed but the project was closed before the prototype had flown.

== See also ==
- Powered lift
- Convertiplane
