= Turbosail =

Type of ship propulsion system

The turbosail or French turbovoile is a marine propulsion system using a sail-like vertical surface and a powered boundary layer control system to improve lift across a wide angle of attack. This allows the sail to power the boat in any direction simply by moving a single flap at the back of the sail, unlike conventional sails which have to be continually adjusted to react to changes in the relative wind.

The turbosail was first developed in a large scale application by Jacques-Yves Cousteau who commissioned the Alcyone to test the concept in production. The larger Calypso II was also designed to use a turbosail, but that design was not built.

== Technical design ==
=== Concept ===
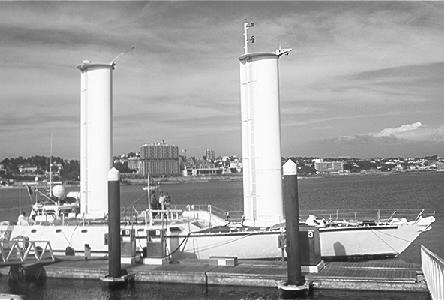
The Alcyone

In 1980, Jacques Cousteau dreamed of creating a ship with a modern engine that would be powered, at least in part, by the wind, a clean, free, renewable energy source.

=== Aerodynamics ===
Cousteau and his associates, Professor Lucien Malavard and Dr. Bertrand Charrier, used a fixed cylinder that looked like a smokestack and functioned like an aeroplane wing.

It consists of an airfoil, vertical and grossly ovoidal tube, with a mobile flap which improves the separation between the intrados and extrados. An aspiration system pulls air into the tubes, and is used to increase the depression on one side of the sail; a reaction force occurs as the result of the pressure difference. In this way, the sails act as wings, creating both lift and drag.

A movable, flap-like trailing-edge shutter and a fan-drawn aspiration system are used for control and increase the magnitude of the maximum reaction force.

As a result of this design, the turbosail provides a reaction force, a component of which, thrust, is available for the direction of travel. Just like an unpowered sail, thrust cannot be obtained when making headway directly into a headwind, nor can it be obtained without wind. However, the use of fan-drawn aspiration, which requires engine power, increases the generated reaction force compared to the unpowered device.

Propeller-based propulsion can be used in conjunction with the turbosails. These traditional engines, together with the angles, and suction power of the sails, can be coordinated with computers to control the ship.

=== Engineering analysis ===
According to the Cousteau Society, "when compared to the thrust coefficient of the best sails ever built (Marconi or square types, i.e. ships of the American Cup [sic] or the Japanese wind propulsion system) that of the turbosail is 3.5 to 4 times superior and gives the system a unique advantage for the economical propulsion of ships."

The efficiency of the system has however not been subjected to sufficient comparative engineering research. There have been only two turbosail-equipped vessels on which active research has been performed. The Cousteau group is the only organisation with a large body of data available on turbosails.

== Early development 1981–1982 : Moulin à Vent ==
Cousteau and his team mounted the invention on a catamaran christened Moulin à Vent (Windmill).

The system consisted of a single turbosail mast, painted a navy blue. The research program for this vessel was designed to test efficiency of thrust with the propulsive system. Having proved the concept, the prototype development was ultimately abandoned in 1982 as Cousteau's group turned their attention to a larger vessel, the Alcyone.

== The Alcyone ==
Cousteau's experience was turned to good use in designing a new vessel. Working with naval engineers, he designed an innovative hull of aluminum, both lightweight and strong. The catamaran-like stern gave it stability. The monohull forward was designed to split swells and improve ride in heavy seas. Two turbosails rose from her deck and two diesel engines provided the necessary suction forces. The ship was named Alcyone, the daughter of the wind.

When the Alcyone was launched in 1985, it benefited from the development of the original turbosail Moulin à Vent. With two turbosails of reduced aspect ratio, the stresses placed on the metal of the sail surfaces was much reduced. Both sails also contained axial turbines for power generation, and with decreases in the cost of computers, also featured sensor driven controls to actuate the sails for optimal thrust.

Practical experience with the ship saw the Cousteau group adopting the vessel as flagship and primary research platform in the 1980s. Computers optimized the functioning of turbosails and engines. To maintain a constant speed, the engines take over automatically when the wind dies down, and they stop completely when the wind is of sufficient strength when blowing in the right direction. A crew of five is required to maintain the ship.

=== Further development ===
With an interest in expanding adoption of the turbosail, it was suggested that tankers and other large vessels would soon install turbosails as a mean to decrease fuel consumption. The system was intended to power the Calypso II, which has yet to be built.

== See also ==
- Rotor ship
- Wind-assisted propulsion
