= Flettner rotor =

Cylindrical, rotating aerodynamic surface

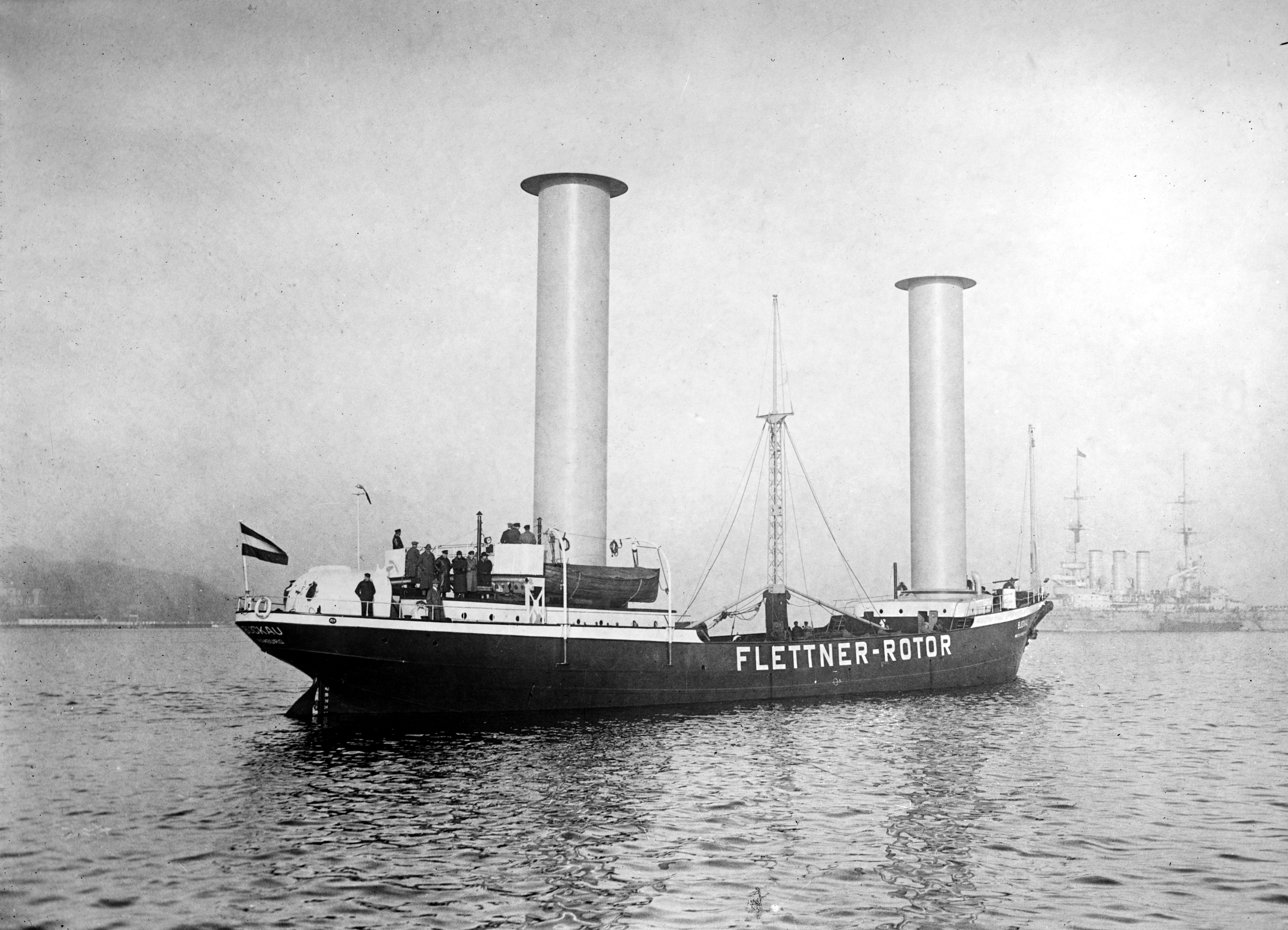
The Buckau, the first vehicle to be propelled by a Flettner rotor

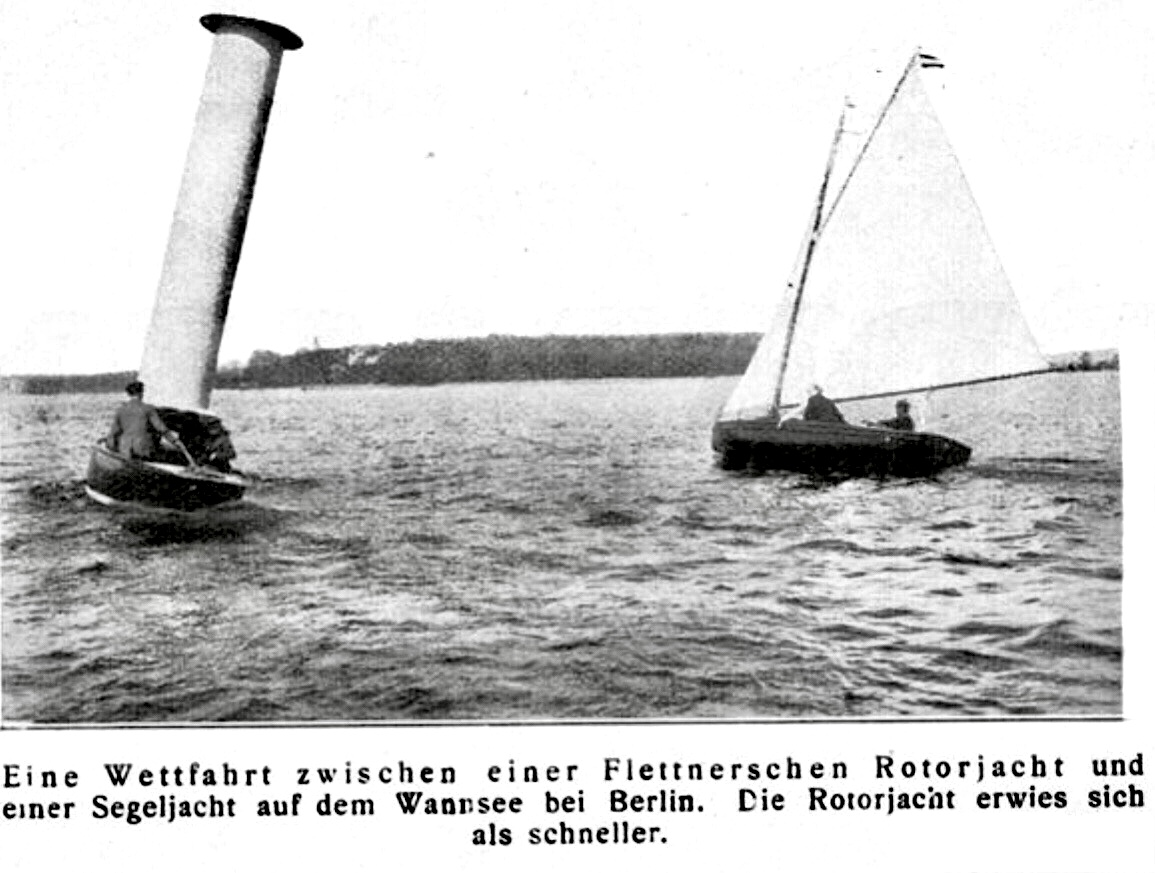
Flettner versus sailing yacht

A Flettner rotor is a right circular cylinder with disc end plates which is spun along its long axis. As air passes across it the Magnus effect causes an aerodynamic lift force to be generated in the direction perpendicular to both the long axis and the direction of airflow. The rotor sail is named after the German aviation engineer and inventor Anton Flettner, who started developing the rotor sail in the 1920s.

In a rotor ship, the rotors stand vertically and lift is generated at right angles to the wind, to drive the ship forwards.

In a rotor airplane, the rotor extends sideways in place of a wing and upwards lift is generated.

== Magnus effect ==
The Magnus effect is named after Gustav Magnus, the German physicist who investigated it. It describes the force generated by fluid flow over a rotating body, at right angles to both the direction of flow and the axis of rotation. This force on a rotating cylinder is known as Kutta–Joukowski lift, after Martin Kutta and Nikolai Zhukovsky (or Joukowski), who first analyzed the effect.

The Flettner rotor is just one form of the Magnus rotor, which in general need not be cylindrical.

== Marine applications ==
=== Rotor ships ===
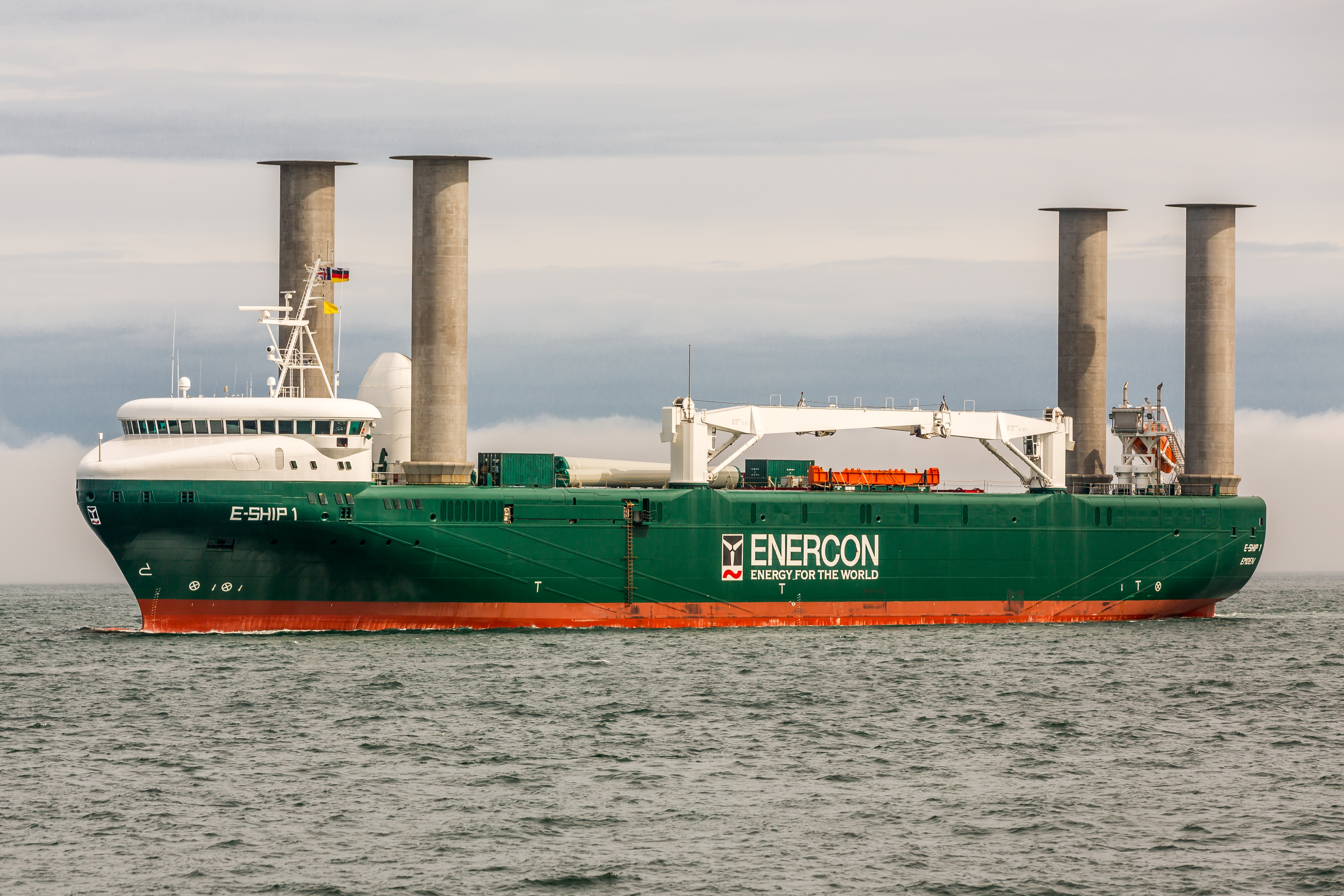
E-Ship 1 with Flettner rotors mounted

A rotor ship uses one or more Flettner rotors mounted upright. They are rotated by the ship's engines and act like sails to propel the ship under wind power. A conventionally-powered underwater propeller may be provided for additional operational flexibility.

An early prototype, the Baden Baden (formerly the Buckau), crossed the Atlantic in 1925, but interest was not revived until energy saving became a major concern in the new millennium. The E-Ship 1 was launched in 2008, and new vessels continue to appear. Since then, multiple rotor installations have been completed, including tilting rotors to allow passage beneath bridges. Under favorable conditions, rotor sails have been reported to generate 5–20% fuel savings.

=== Stabilizers ===
A Flettner rotor mounted beneath the waterline of a ship's hull and emerging laterally will act to stabilize the ship in heavy seas. By controlling the direction and speed of rotation, strong lift or downforce can be generated. The largest deployment of the system to date is in the motor yacht Eclipse.

== Rotor airplanes ==
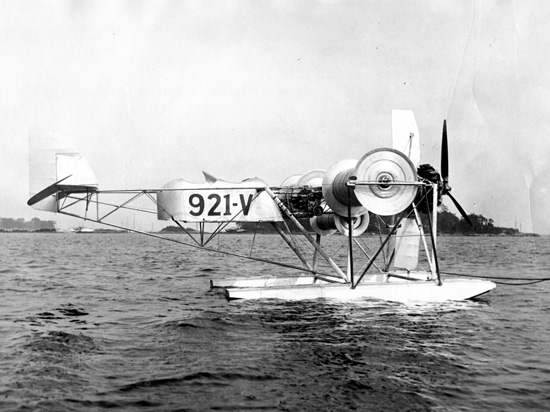
The Plymouth A-A-2004 on Long Island Sound, 1930s

Some flying machines have been built which use the Magnus effect to create lift with a rotating cylinder at the front of a wing, enabling flight at lower horizontal speeds.

An early attempt to use the Magnus effect for a heavier-than-air aircraft was made in 1908 by a US member of Congress, Butler Ames of Massachusetts.

A later example was the Plymouth A-A-2004 in the early 1930s, built by three inventors in New York state.

French designer Jean de Chappedelaine developed his Aérogyre at much the same time. A prototype, based on a modified Caudron C.270 Luciole, was flown in 1934 with the wing rotor stationary. It crashed on its next flight, but whether the wing was rotating during that flight is unknown.
