= Wing =

Appendage used for flight

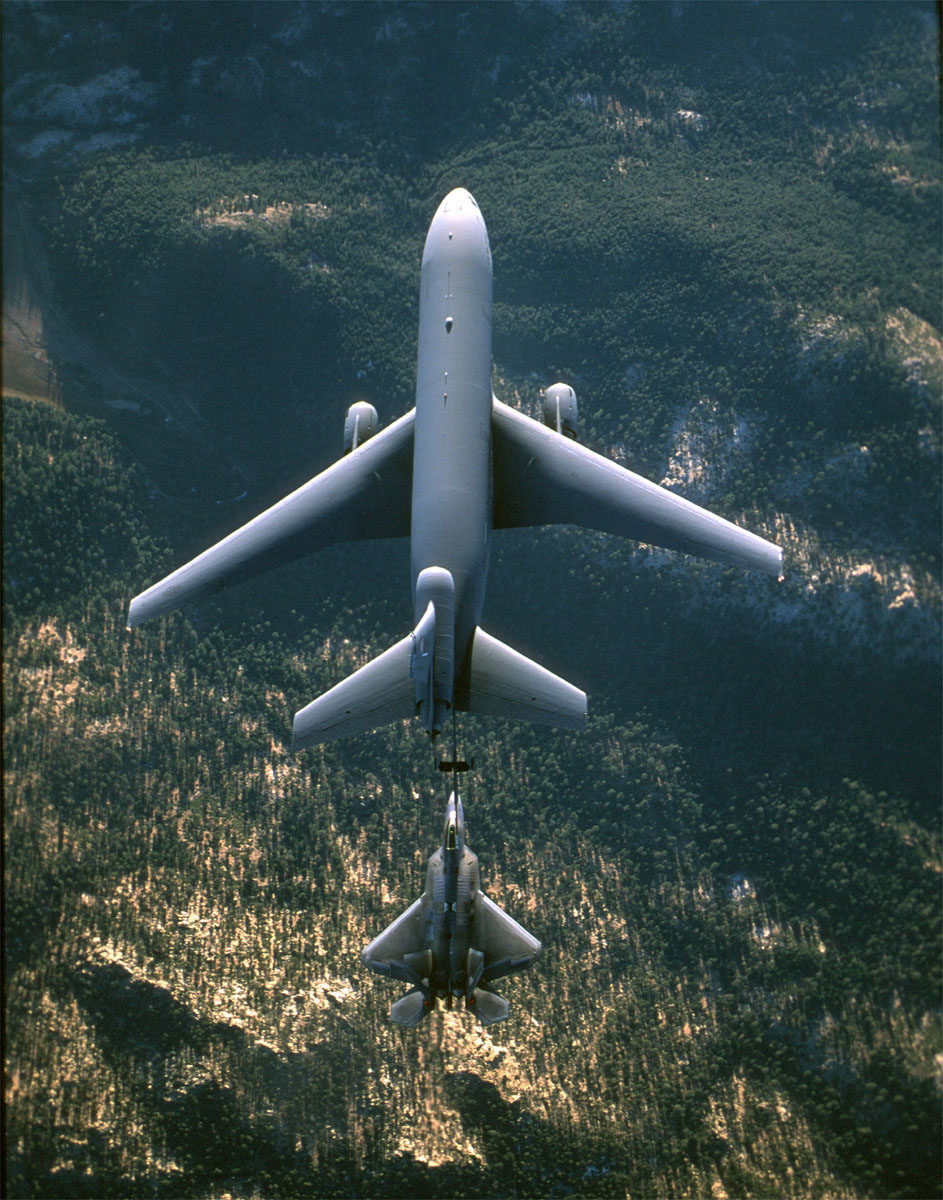
Two different planforms are shown with a swept wing KC-10 Extender (top) refueling a diamond-like delta wing F-22 Raptor

A wing is a structure which produces both lift and drag while moving through air. Wings are defined by two shape characteristics, an airfoil section and a planform. Wing efficiency is expressed as lift-to-drag ratio, which compares the benefit of lift with the air resistance of a given wing shape, as it flies. Aerodynamics includes the study of wing performance in air.

Equivalent foils that move through water are found on hydrofoil power vessels and foiling sailboats that lift out of the water at speed and on submarines that use diving planes to point the boat upwards or downwards, while running submerged. The study of foil performance in water is a subfield of Hydrodynamics.

== Etymology and usage ==
The word wing is a borrowing from Old Norse vængr. For many centuries, it referred mainly to the foremost limbs of birds (in addition to the architectural aisle). But in recent centuries the word's meaning has extended to include lift producing appendages of insects, bats, pterosaurs, boomerangs, some sail boats and aircraft, or the airfoil on a race car.

== Aerodynamics ==
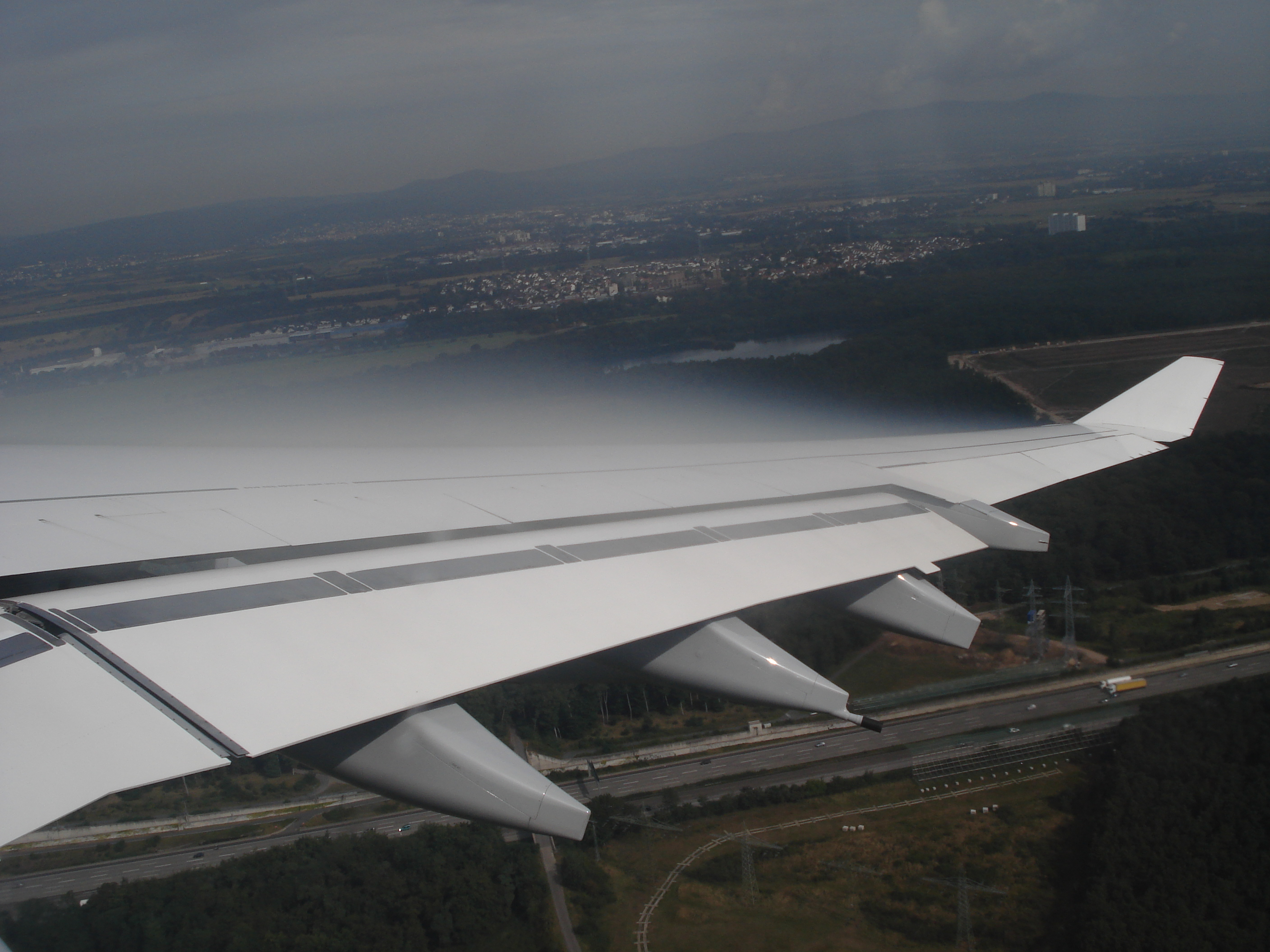
Condensation in the low-pressure region over the wing of an Airbus A340, passing through humid air

Flaps (green) are used in various configurations to increase the wing area and to increase the lift. In conjunction with spoilers (red), flaps maximize drag and minimize lift during the landing roll.

The design and analysis of the wings of aircraft is one of the principal applications of the science of aerodynamics, which is a branch of fluid mechanics. The properties of the airflow around any moving object can be found by solving the Navier–Stokes equations of fluid dynamics. Except for simple geometries, these equations are difficult to solve. Simpler explanations can be given.

For a wing to produce "lift", it must be oriented at a suitable angle of attack relative to the flow of air past the wing. When this occurs, the wing deflects the airflow downwards, "turning" the air as it passes the wing. Since the wing exerts a force on the air to change its direction, the air must exert a force on the wing, equal in size but opposite in direction. This force arises from different air pressures that exist on the upper and lower surfaces of the wing.

Lower-than-ambient air pressure is generated on the top surface of the wing, with a higher-than ambient-pressure on the bottom of the wing. (See: airfoil) These air pressure differences can be either measured using a pressure-measuring device, or can be calculated from the airspeed using physical principles –including Bernoulli's principle, which relates changes in air speed to changes in air pressure.

The lower air pressure on the top of the wing generates a smaller downward force on the top of the wing than the upward force generated by the higher air pressure on the bottom of the wing. This gives an upward force on the wing. This force is called the lift generated by the wing.

The different velocities of the air passing by the wing, the air pressure differences, the change in direction of the airflow, and the lift on the wing are different ways of describing how lift is produced so it is possible to calculate lift from any one of the other three. For example, the lift can be calculated from the pressure differences, or from different velocities of the air above and below the wing, or from the total momentum change of the deflected air. Fluid dynamics offers other approaches to solving these problems –all which methods produce the same answer if correctly calculated. Given a particular wing and its velocity through the air, debates over which mathematical approach is the most convenient to use can be mistaken by those not familiar with the study of aerodynamics as differences of opinion about the basic principles of flight.

=== Cross-sectional shape ===
Wings with an asymmetrical cross-section are the norm in subsonic flight. Wings with a symmetrical cross-section can also generate lift by using a positive angle of attack to deflect air downward. Symmetrical airfoils have higher stalling speeds than cambered airfoils of the same wing area but are used in aerobatic aircraft as they provide the same flight characteristics whether the aircraft is upright or inverted. Another example comes from sailboats, where the sail is a thin sheet.

For flight speeds near the speed of sound (transonic flight), specific asymmetrical airfoil sections are used to minimize the very pronounced increase in drag associated with airflow near the speed of sound. These airfoils, called supercritical airfoils, are flat on top and curved on the bottom.

== Design features ==
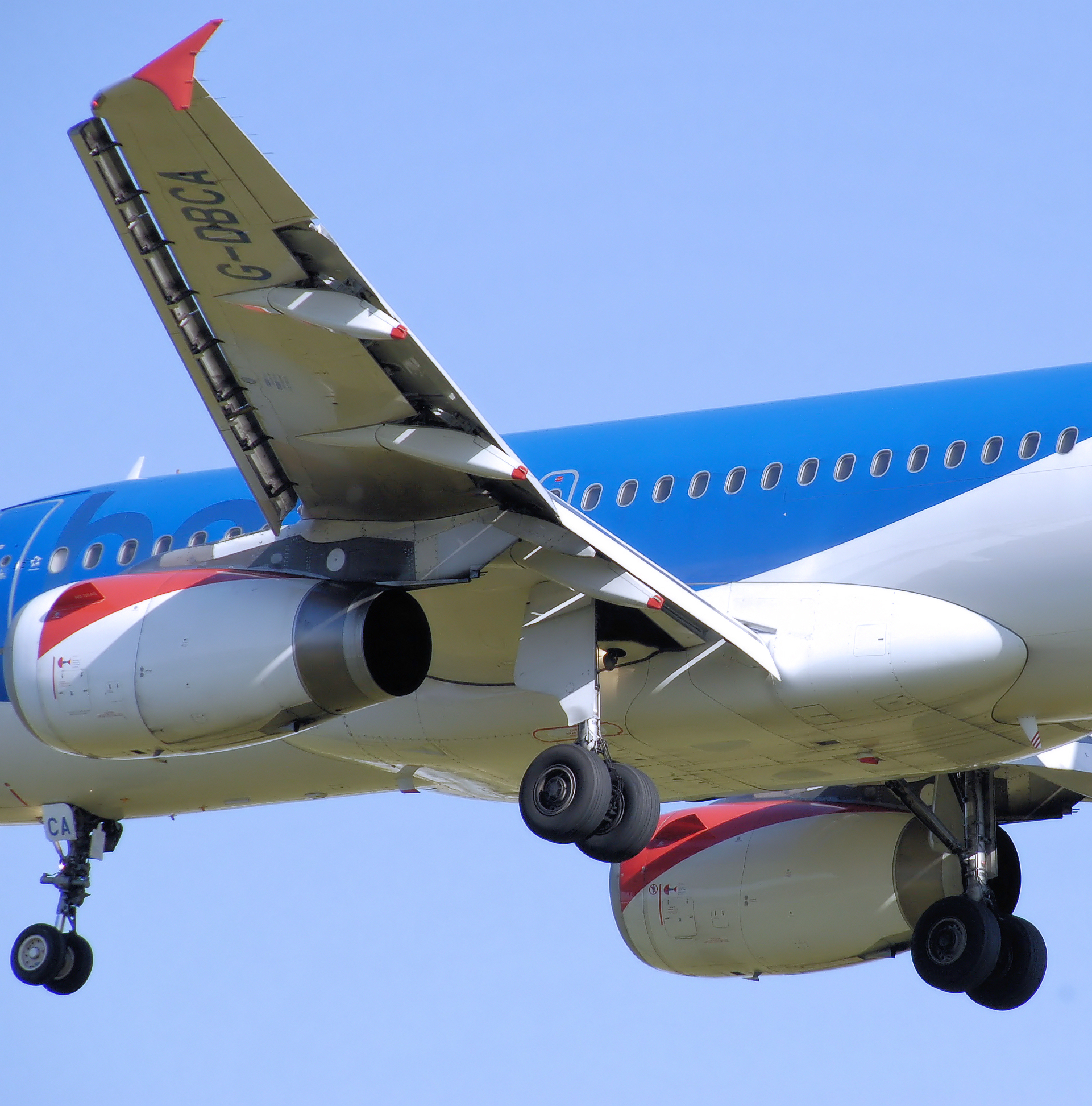
The wing of a landing BMI Airbus A319-100. The slats at its leading edge and the flaps at its trailing edge are extended.

Aircraft wings may feature some of the following:

- A rounded leading edge cross-section, on subsonic wings
- A sharp trailing edge cross-section
- Leading-edge devices such as slats, slots, or extensions
- Trailing-edge devices such as flaps or flaperons (combination of flaps and ailerons)
- Winglets to keep wingtip vortices from increasing drag and decreasing lift
- Dihedral, or a positive wing angle to the horizontal, increases spiral stability around the roll axis, whereas anhedral, or a negative wing angle to the horizontal, decreases spiral stability.

Aircraft wings may have various devices, such as flaps or slats, that the pilot uses to modify the shape and surface area of the wing to change its operating characteristics in flight.

- Ailerons (usually near the wingtips) to roll the aircraft
- Spoilers on the upper surface to increase drag for descent and to reduce lift for more weight on wheels during braking
- Vortex generators to help prevent flow separation in transonic flow
- Wing fences to keep flow attached to the wing by stopping boundary layer separation from spreading roll direction.
- Folding wings allow more aircraft storage in the confined space of the hangar deck of an aircraft carrier
- Variable-sweep wing or "swing wings" that allow outstretched wings during low-speed flight (e.g., take-off, landing and loitering) and swept back wings for high-speed flight (including supersonic flight), such as in the F-111 Aardvark, the F-14 Tomcat, the Panavia Tornado, the MiG-23, the MiG-27, the Tu-160 and the B-1B Lancer.

== Types ==
- Swept Wings
- Variable Sweep Wings (includes Oblique wings)
- Delta Wings
- Elliptical wings
- Trapezoidal wings

== Applications ==
Besides fixed-wing aircraft, applications for wing shapes include:

- Hang gliders, which use wings ranging from fully flexible (paragliders, gliding parachutes), flexible (framed sail wings), to rigid
- Kites, which use a variety of lifting surfaces
- Flying model airplanes
- Helicopters, which use a rotating wing with a variable pitch angle to provide directional forces
- Propellers, whose rotating blades generate lift in the direction of propulsion
- The NASA Space Shuttle, which uses its wings only to glide during its descent to a runway. These types of aircraft are called spaceplanes.
- Some racing cars, especially Formula One cars, which use upside-down wings (or airfoils) to provide greater traction at high speeds
- Sailboats, which use sails as vertical wings with variable fullness and direction to move across water

== Flexible wings ==
In 1948, Francis Rogallo invented the fully limp flexible wing. Domina Jalbert invented flexible un-sparred ram-air airfoiled thick wings.

== In nature ==
Wings have evolved multiple times in history: in insects, dinosaurs (see bird wing), mammals (see bats), fish, reptiles (see pterosaurs), and plants. Wings of birds, bats, and pterosaurs all evolved from existing limbs, however insect wings evolved as a completely separate structure. Wings facilitated increased locomotion, dispersal, and diversification. Various species of penguins and other flighted or flightless water birds such as auks, cormorants, guillemots, shearwaters, eider and scoter ducks and diving petrels are efficient underwater swimmers, and use their wings to propel through water.

Wing forms in nature

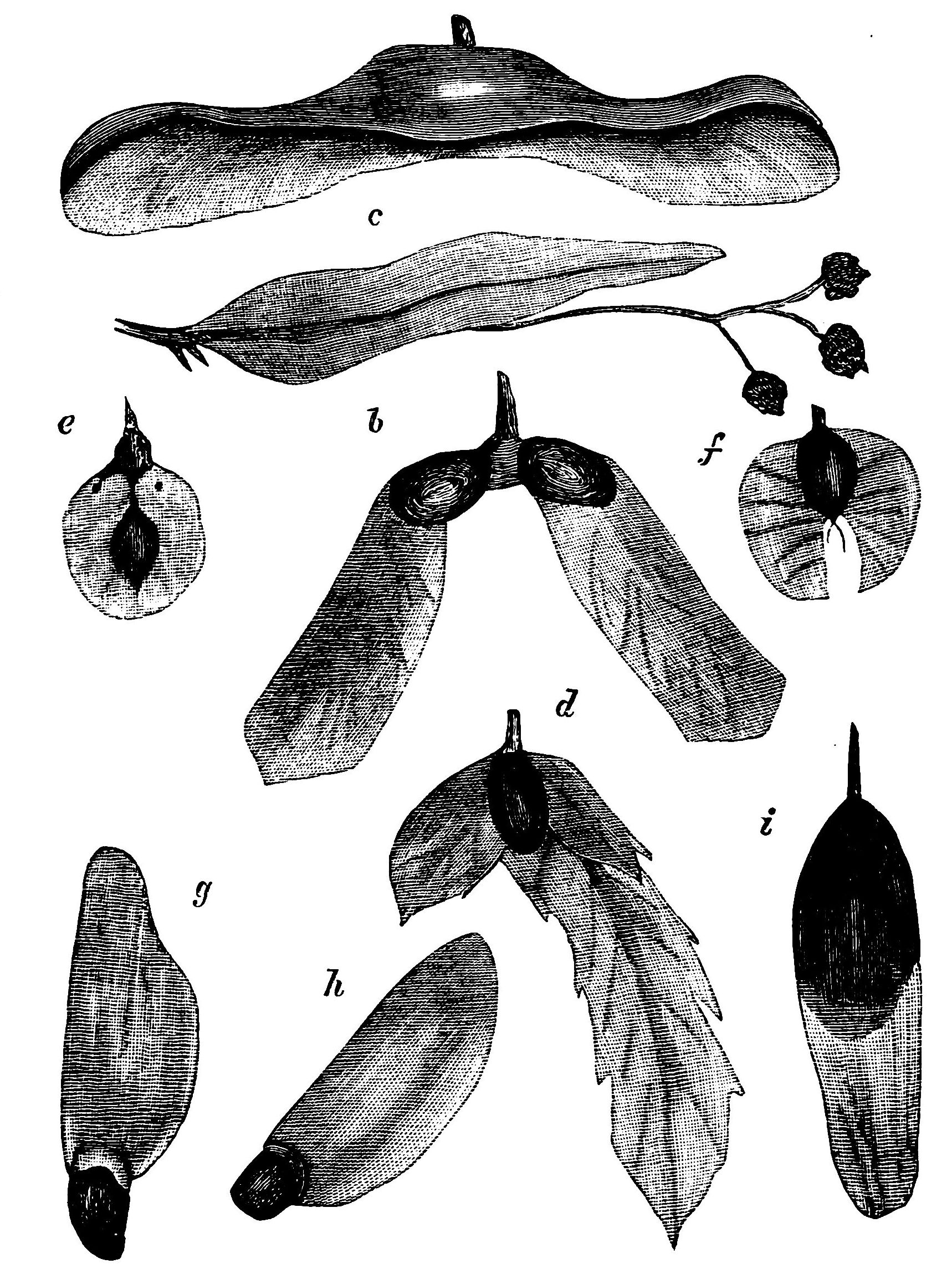
Winged tree seeds that cause autorotation in descent

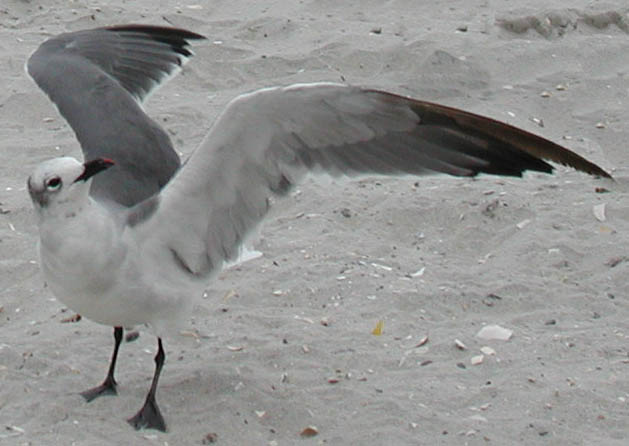
A laughing gull, exhibiting the "gull wing" outline.

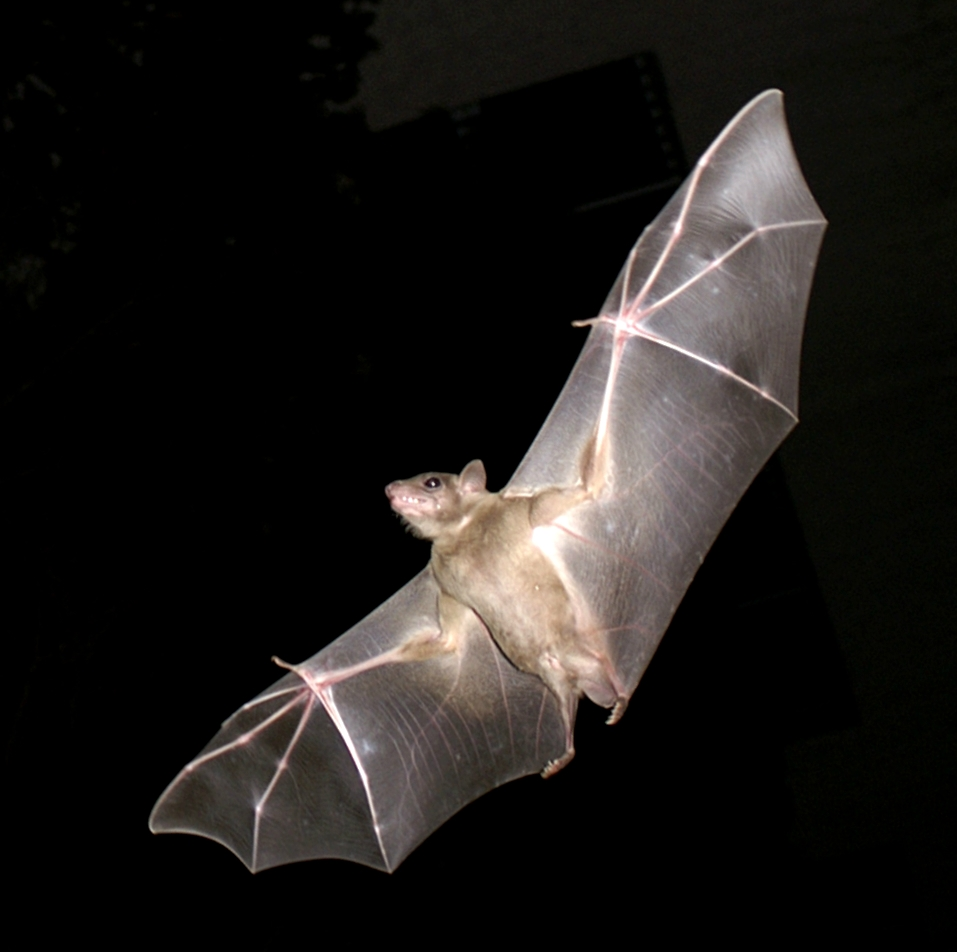
Bat in flight

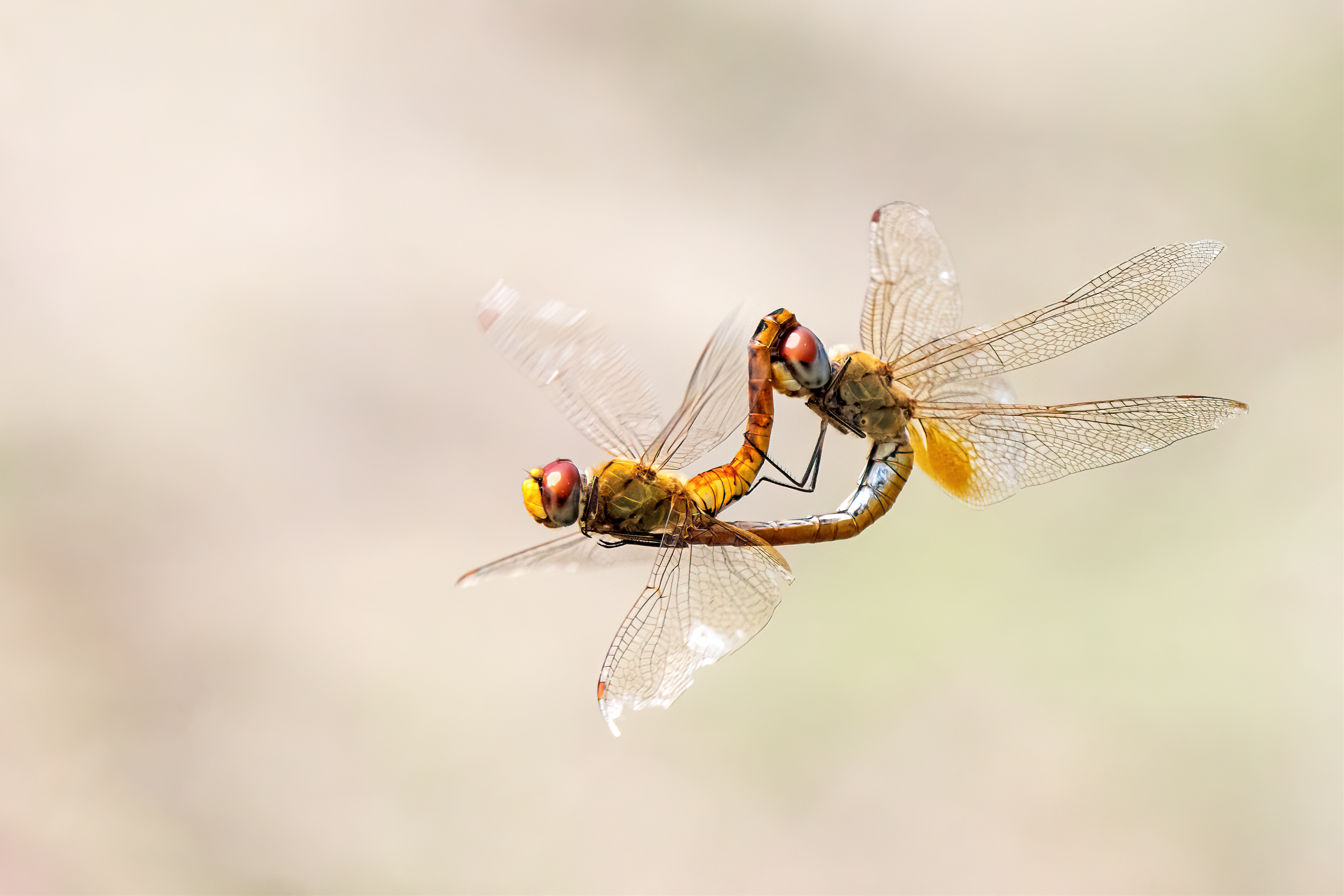
Dragonflies mating in flight

== See also ==
- Flight

Natural world:

- Bird flight
- Flight feather
- Flying and gliding animals
- Insect flight
- List of soaring birds
- Samara (winged seeds of trees)

Aviation:

- Aircraft
- Blade solidity
- FanWing and Flettner airplane (experimental wing types)
- Flight dynamics
- Kite types
- Ornithopter – flapping-wing aircraft (research prototypes, simple toys and models)
- Otto Lilienthal
- Wing configuration
- Wingsuit flying

Sailing:

- Sails
- Forces on sails
- Wingsail
