= FanWing =

Type of aircraft rotor wing

FanWing cross-section showing airflow

The FanWing is a type of aircraft rotor wing in which a horizontal-axis cross-flow fan is used in close conjunction with a fixed wing. The fan forces airflow over the fixed surface to provide both lift and forward thrust.

The concept was initially developed around 1997 by designer Patrick Peebles and is under development by his company FanWing Ltd. As of December 2024, only experimental drones have been flown.

== Principles of operation ==
A cross-flow fan comprises blades radiating from a central axis and aligned with the axis. It is contained in a duct which is shaped so that when the fan spins, it induces a directional airflow. In the FanWing, the fan is set above the leading section of a fixed wing and extends the full span of the wing. The wing upper surface is shaped around the fan to form a half-duct. The wing chord extends aft of the fan, with the rear section shaped as a wedge-like fairing with sloping flat upper surface, that extends to the trailing edge.

When the fan spins with the upper edge moving backwards and the lower edge forwards, the fixed half-duct is shaped to create a net backward flow of air, resulting in forward thrust. This backward flow over the upper surfaces also creates a net circulation of air around the rotor-wing combination, resulting in vertical lift.

The flow sets up a trapped vortex within the rotor, which can rotate faster than the airspeed and greatly enhances both lift and thrust.

Twisting the fan blades into a slight spiral, in a manner similar to a cylinder mower, helps to reduce rotor noise and make it inherently quieter in operation.

Extending the length of the fixed trailing wedge section reduces drag.

=== Gliding flight ===
When unpowered, the rotor will autorotate under forward motion and create lift as a glider. Adding a rounded leading edge improves performance when gliding in auto-rotation mode. However the glideslope is generally poor, at around 1:4.

=== Aircraft configuration ===
Addition of an outboard tail recovers energy from the wing tip vortices to significantly increase overall efficiency. This in turn allows an even lower minimum forward speed.

=== Advantages ===
In addition to providing forward thrust in its own right, the radial fan increases the velocity of the airflow over the wing's upper surface independently of the forward motion of the aircraft, thereby creating useful lift at forward speeds lower than the stalling speed for a conventional wing.

=== Limitations ===
Besides the added weight and complexity of the fan system, it has some limitations compared with a conventional fixed wing:

- Glide ratio in case of power failure is low (about 1:4) if the rotors are allowed to auto-rotate.

== History ==
Although the cross-flow fan has been known since the late nineteenth century, its use as a rotary aircraft wing was not studied until 1997 when Patrick Peebles, an American based in Europe, conceived of it as a STOL device and subsequently formed the FanWing Co. Wind tunnel tests and powered model flights were supported by UK government funding, winning SMART grant awards in 2002 and 2003. Work began on a prototype drone, ostensibly aimed at the STOL urban surveillance market. The benefits of adding a tail were discovered during continued development. By 2014, support for wind tunnel tests of a 1.5 meter wing section was being provided through EU sources including €783,000 through the German Aerospace Center.

As of December 2024, only unmanned development prototypes have flown.

== See also ==
- Channel wing
- Flettner airplane
- Rotary-wing aircraft
- Ornithopter
- Gyroplane
