= E-Ship 1 =

Ship built in 2010

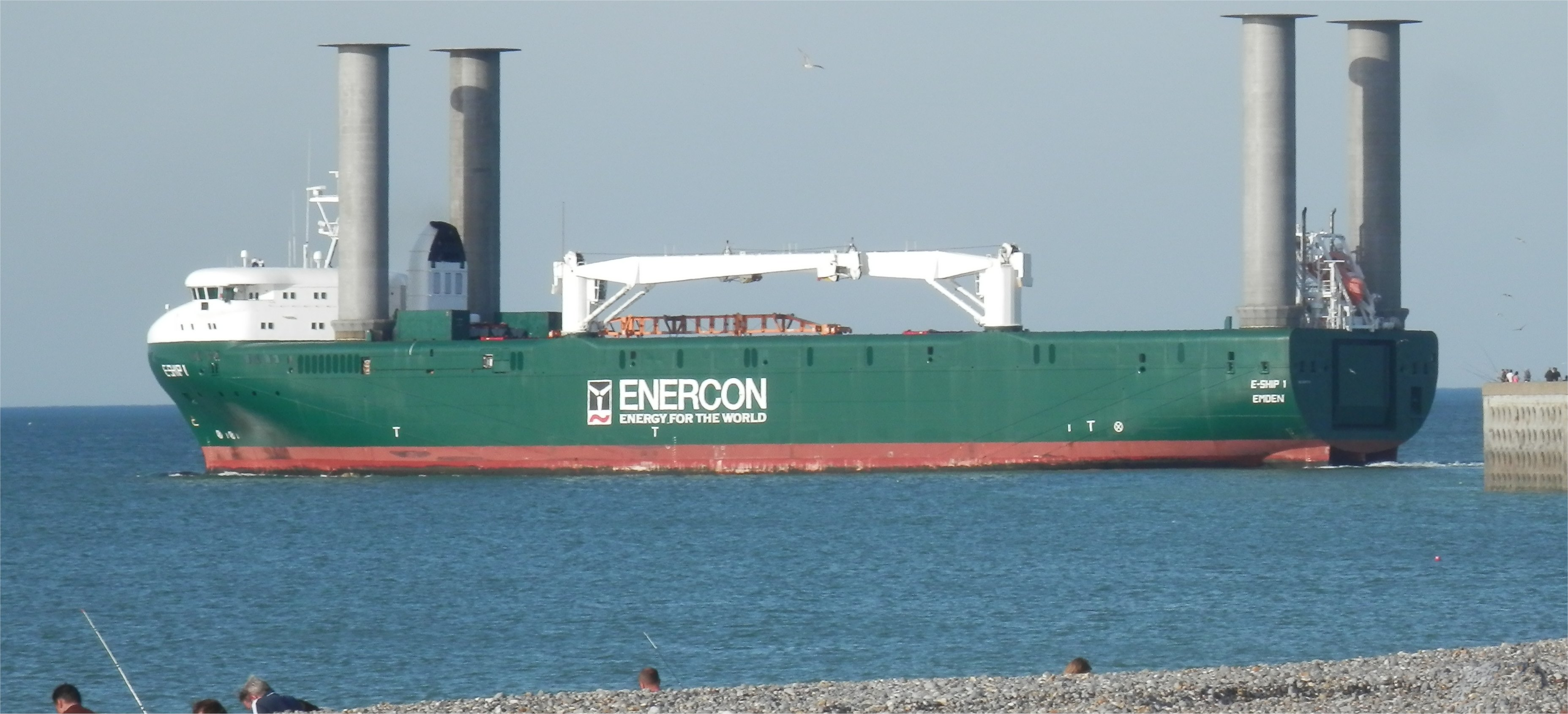
- E-Ship 1 in Dieppe

History
- Name: E-Ship 1
- Owner: Enercon
- Builder: Lindenau GmbH shipyards in Kiel, Germany; Cassens Werft in Emden, Germany
- Launched: 2 August 2008
- Completed: 6 August 2010
- Identification: IMO number: 9417141; MMSI number: 218108000; Callsign: DGFN2
- Status: In active service, as of 2010

General characteristics
- Class & type: RoLo cargo ship
- Tonnage: 10,500 DWT
- Length: 130 m (426 ft 6 in)
- Beam: 22.5 m (73 ft 10 in)
- Draught: 6 to 9 m (19 ft 8 in to 29 ft 6 in)
- Installed power: Two diesel engines (2 × 3.5 MW)
- Propulsion: Four Flettner rotors (0-350 RPM 25m high, 4m dia.); Two propellers
- Speed: Max 17.5 knots (32.4 km/h; 20.1 mph)
- Capacity: 3 holds below deck, 20,580 m^{3} (727,000 cu ft)
- Notes: Special classification: Germanischer Lloyd

E-Ship 1 is a roll-on/lift-off (RoLo) cargo ship that made its first voyage with cargo in August 2010. The ship is owned by the third-largest wind turbine manufacturer, Germany's Enercon GmbH. It is used to transport wind turbine components. The E-Ship 1 is a Flettner ship: four large rotorsails that rise from its deck are rotated via a power take-off from the ship's engines. The sails, or Flettner rotors, aid the ship's propulsion by means of the Magnus effect – the perpendicular force that is exerted on a spinning body moving through a fluid stream.

== Building history ==
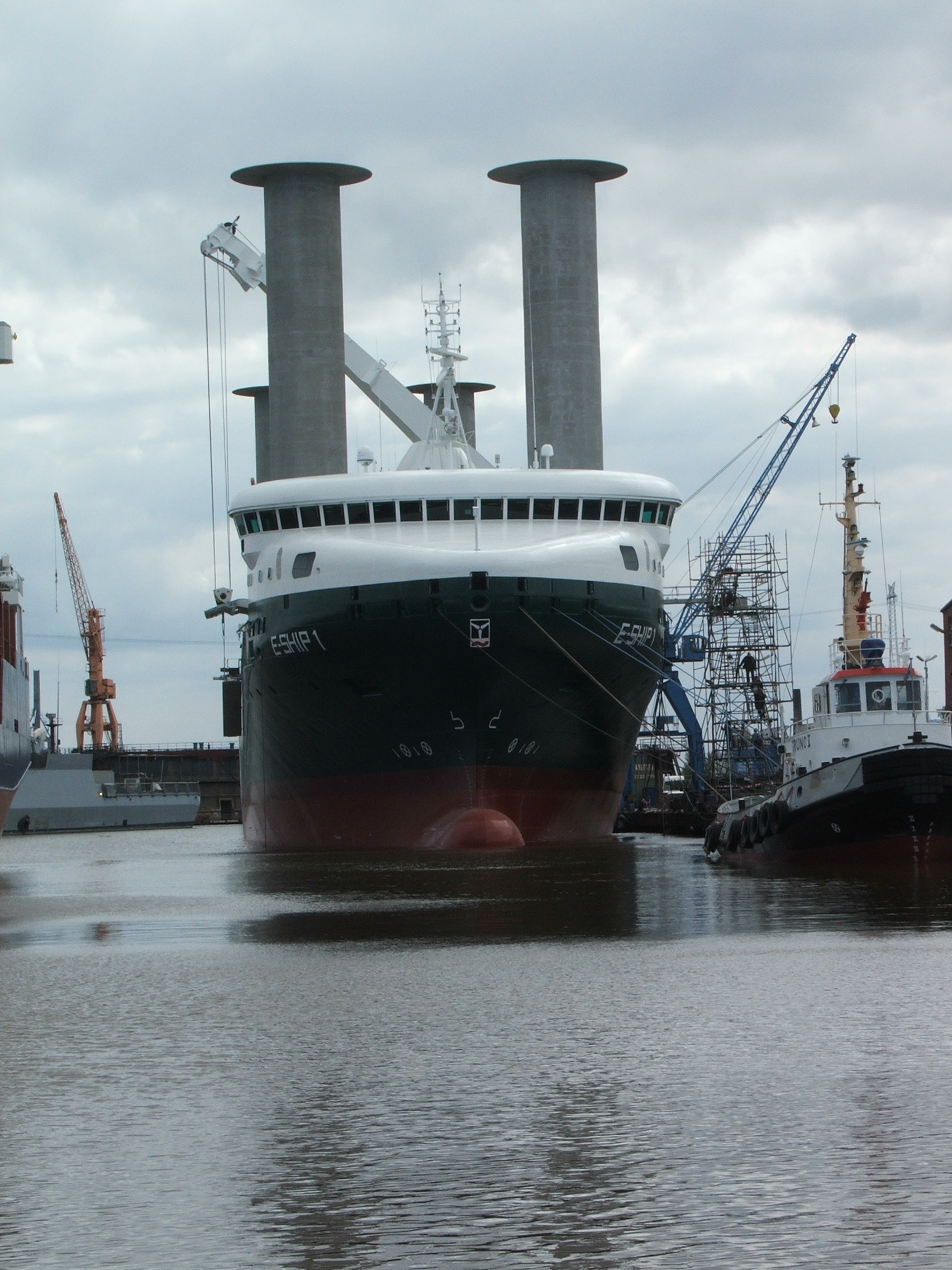
E-Ship 1 at Cassens-Werft shipyard

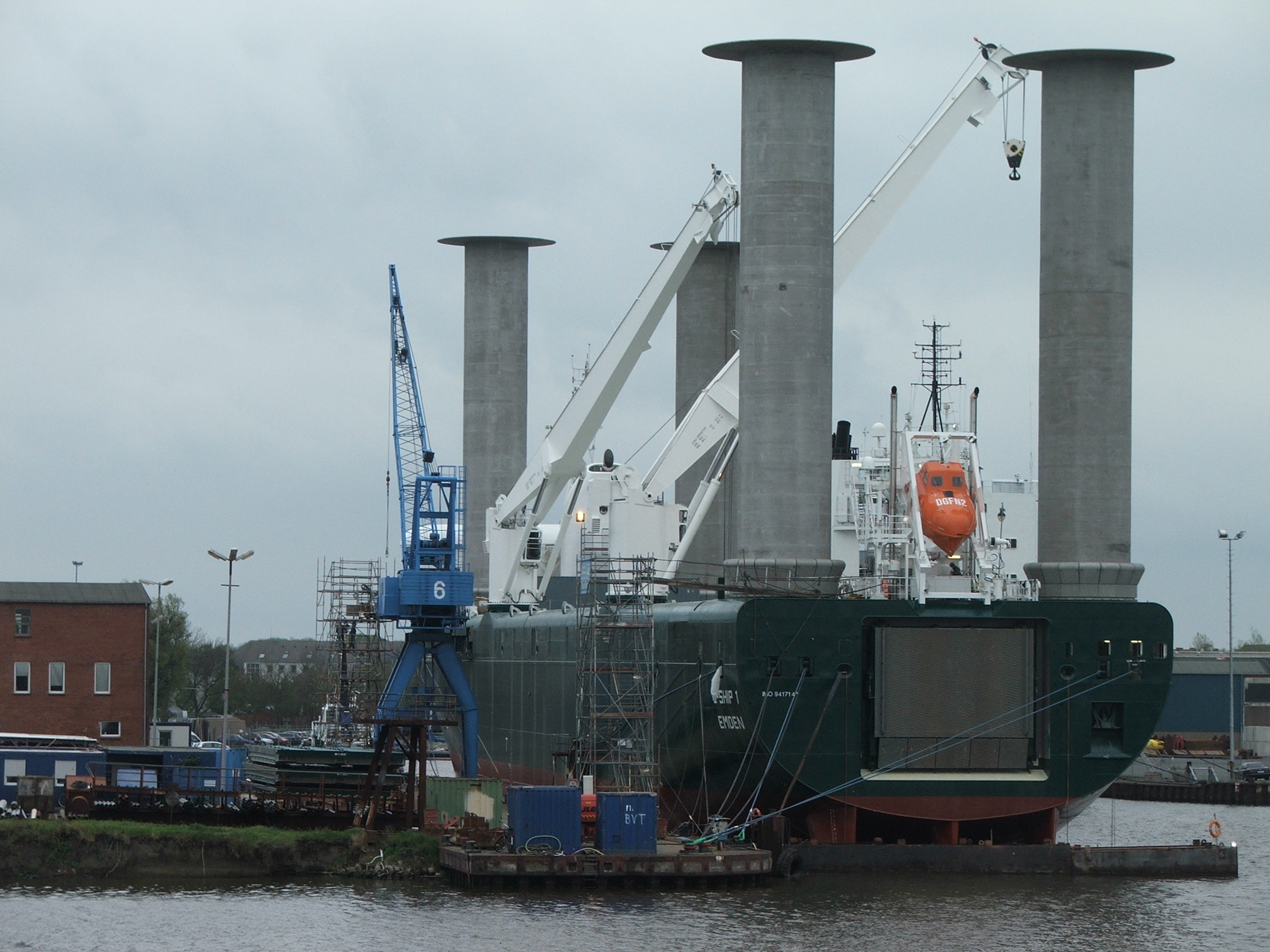
E-Ship 1 with Flettner rotors mounted

The hull of E-Ship 1 was built by German shipbuilder Lindenau Werft in Kiel. The ship's launch took place on 2 August 2008, with the delivery date estimated for the first half of 2009. In September 2008, Lindenau-Werft declared insolvency. On 25 January 2009, it was announced that E-Ship 1 would be towed to and completed by German shipyard Cassens-Werft in Emden.

Steel construction work was completed in 2010, and the ship was docked at North Sea Works, where final construction took place with the ship in the water. In April 2010, the E-Ship 1 returned to Cassens Werft, where preparations were made for sea trials. The ship set off for a first sea trial from Emden to Bremerhaven on 6 July 2010. Three trial runs were completed by the end of July. The ship made its first voyage with cargo in August 2010, carrying nine turbines for Castledockrell Wind Farm from Emden to Dublin, Ireland.

== Structure ==
The ship's bridge is located at the bow, and it has three decks and two port-related long-boom cranes with payload capabilities of 80 and 120 tonnes. The ship has a rear ramp, and can function as a RoLo cargo ship. It is 130 meters in length and 22.5 meters wide, with a gross tonnage of 12,968 and a deadweight tonnage of 10,000. It is equipped with fore and aft maneuvering thrusters and has an Ice class GL E3 hull rating.

== Propulsion and machinery ==
The E-Ship 1 was initially equipped with nine Mitsubishi marine diesel engines with a total output of 3.5 MW. The ship's exhaust gas boilers are connected to a Siemens downstream steam turbine, which in turn drives four Enercon-developed Flettner rotors. These rotors, resembling four large cylinders mounted on the ship's deck, are 27 meters tall and 4 meters in diameter. The speed and direction of rotation varies up to 300RPM depending on the prevailing wind speed and direction relative to the ship. Due to technical problems seven of the Mitsubishi diesel generators were replaced by Caterpillar diesel generators in 2013. The new Caterpillar generators generate a total power of 6.3 MW.

== Published performance information ==
Performance results for the ship (including sea-keeping and wind power) were published by Enercon on 23 September 2013.
