= Plymouth A-A-2004 =

Magnus Effect Aircraft

The Plymouth A-A-2004 is a rotor aircraft inspired by the Flettner rotor, a type of rotor that uses the Magnus effect to produce lift. Built specifically for Zaparka in 1930 by three anonymous American inventors, this aircraft showcased the innovative use of the Magnus effect in aviation, leading to successful flights over Long Island Sound.

== Design and features ==
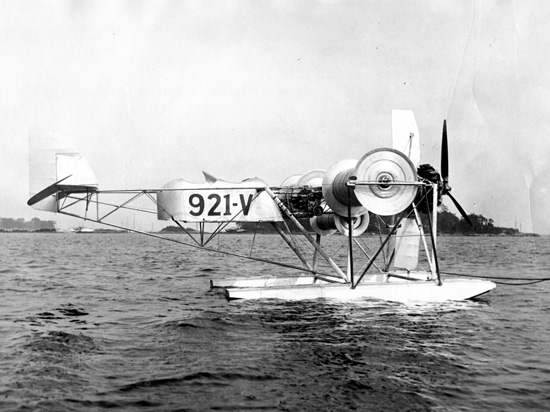
The Plymouth A-A-2004 on Long Island Sound, 1930s

The Plymouth A-A-2004 rotor aircraft employs a distinct design, using rotating cylinders in place of traditional wings to produce lift. These rotors, based on the design of the Flettner rotor, spin at a rapid rate, causing air to move faster over one side than the other, resulting in a lift due to the Magnus effect. The aircraft was equipped with a 300 hp (220 kW) Wright J-6 engine which powered a tractor propeller. A second engine, an 85 hp (63 kW) American Cirrus, was used to spin the rotors.

== History and development ==
The Plymouth A-A-2004 was commissioned by Zaparka and constructed in 1930 by three anonymous American inventors. The design drew inspiration from the Flettner rotor and was reported to have achieved successful flight missions over Long Island Sound.

== Magnus effect and Flettner rotor ==
The Magnus effect describes the phenomenon wherein a spinning object moving through a fluid (e.g., air or water) creates a difference in pressure on its sides, resulting in a force perpendicular to its motion. Anton Flettner, in the 1920s, conceived the Flettner rotor, a spinning cylinder that harnesses the Magnus effect for lift or propulsion. By leveraging this principle, the Plymouth A-A-2004 managed to achieve flight without the need for conventional wings.

== Safety concerns ==
One of the inherent safety challenges of the Plymouth A-A-2004 design is the reliance on the continuous rotation of the drums to generate lift. In situations where power to the rotating drums is lost, even if propulsion thrust remains intact, the aircraft would confront a significant risk. As the drum's rotation slows down, the Magnus effect's lift generation would diminish, compromising the aircraft's ability to maintain altitude and potentially leading to a rapid descent.
