= Alcyone (1985 ship) =

Experimental turbosail ship

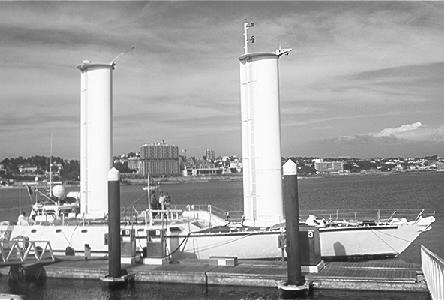
- Turbosail ship Alcyone in harbour

History

France
- Name: Alcyone
- Namesake: Alcyone
- Owner: Cousteau Society
- Port of registry: La Rochelle, France
- Builder: Ateliers & Chantiers La Rochelle Pallice
- Yard number: 1238
- Launched: 1985
- Completed: 1985
- Homeport: Concarneau, Brittany, France
- Identification: Call sign: FIOX; IMO number: 8412833; MMSI number: 226195000

General characteristics
- Type: Research ship
- Length: 103 ft (31.4 m)
- Beam: 29 ft (8.8 m)
- Draught: 7 ft 8 in (2.3 m)
- Sail plan: Turbosail; 226 sq ft (21.0 m^{2}) surface area
- Speed: 10.5 knots (19.4 km/h; 12.1 mph)
- Crew: 12

Alcyone is a ship launched at La Rochelle in 1985 for the Cousteau Society. Alcyone was created as an expedition ship and to test the operation of a new kind of marine propulsion system, the turbosail. Alcyone's two turbosails augment its diesel engines. Since the accidental sinking of Calypso, Alcyone has been the Cousteau Society's expedition vessel.

== Alcyone in popular culture ==
- John Denver wrote a short song called "Alcyone The Wind" as a tribute to Alcyone. The song was sung in the 1993 documentary Secret Societies of Dolphins and Whales.
