= Magnus effect =

Deflection of a spinning object moving through a fluid

The Magnus effect is a phenomenon that occurs when a spinning object is moving through a fluid. A lift force acts on the spinning object and its path may be deflected in a manner not present when it is not spinning. The strength and direction of the Magnus force is dependent on the speed and direction of the rotation of the object.

The Magnus effect is named after Heinrich Gustav Magnus, the German physicist who investigated it. The force on a rotating cylinder is an example of Kutta–Joukowski lift, named after Martin Kutta and Nikolay Zhukovsky (or Joukowski), mathematicians who contributed to the knowledge of how lift is generated in a fluid flow.

== Description ==
The most readily observable case of the Magnus effect is when a spinning sphere (or cylinder) curves away from the arc it would follow if it were not spinning. It is often used in football (soccer), volleyball, baseball pitching, cricket bowling, tennis and table tennis, and other ball sports, and is important in studying the physics of these sports. It is also an important factor in the study of the effects of spinning on guided missiles, and has some engineering uses, such as in the design of rotor ships and Flettner airplanes.

Topspin in ball games is defined as spin about a horizontal axis perpendicular to the direction of travel that moves the top surface of the ball in the direction of travel. Under the Magnus effect, topspin produces a downward swerve of a moving ball, greater than would be produced by gravity alone. Backspin produces an upwards force that prolongs the flight of a moving ball. Likewise, side-spin causes swerve to either side as seen during some baseball pitches, such as a slider. The overall behaviour is similar to that around an aerofoil (see lift force), but with a circulation generated by mechanical rotation rather than shape of the foil.

In baseball, this effect is used to generate the downward motion of a curveball, in which the baseball is rotating forward (with "topspin"). Participants in other sports played with a ball also take advantage of this effect.

== Physics ==
The Magnus effect or Magnus force acts on a rotating body moving relative to a fluid. Examples include a "curveball" in baseball or a tennis ball hit obliquely. The rotation alters the boundary layer between the object and the fluid. The force is perpendicular to the relative direction of motion and oriented towards the direction of rotation, i.e., the direction the "nose" of the ball is turning towards. The magnitude of the force depends primarily on the rotation rate, the relative velocity, and the geometry of the body; the magnitude also depends upon the body's surface roughness and viscosity of the fluid. Accurate quantitative predictions of the force are difficult, but as with other examples of aerodynamic lift there are simpler, qualitative explanations:

=== Flow deflection ===
The Magnus effect, depicted with a backspinning cylinder or ball in an airstream. The arrow represents the resulting lifting force. The curly flow lines represent a turbulent wake. The airflow has been deflected in the direction of spin. Air is carried around the object; this adds to the velocity of the airstream above the object and subtracts below resulting in increased airspeed above and lowered airspeed below.

The wake and trailing air-flow are deflected; according to Newton's third law of motion there must be a reaction force in the opposite direction.

=== Pressure differences ===
The air's viscosity and the surface roughness of the object cause the air to be carried around the object. This adds to the air velocity on one side of the object and decreases the velocity on the other side. Bernoulli's principle states that under certain conditions increased flow speed is associated with reduced pressure, implying that there is lower air pressure on one side than the other. This pressure difference results in a force perpendicular to the direction of travel.

While the pipe rotates, as a consequence of fluid friction, it pulls air around it. This makes the air flow with higher speed on one side of the pipe and with lower speed on the other side.

Magnus effect in a particle simulation of a 2D liquid

=== Kutta–Joukowski lift ===
The topspinning cylinder "pulls" the airflow up and the air in turn pulls the cylinder down, as per Newton's third law.

On a cylinder, the force due to rotation is an example of Kutta–Joukowski lift. It can be analysed in terms of the vortex produced by rotation. The lift per unit length of the cylinder $L^{\prime}$, is the product of the freestream velocity $v_{\infty}$, the fluid density $\rho_{\infty}$ and circulation $\Gamma$ due to viscous effects:

$$L^{\prime}= \rho_{\infty} v_{\infty} \Gamma,$$

where the vortex strength (assuming that the surrounding fluid obeys the no-slip condition) is given by

$\Gamma = 2 \pi \omega r^2$

where ω is the angular velocity of the cylinder (in rad/s) and r is the radius of the cylinder.

=== Inverse Magnus effect ===
In wind tunnel studies, (rough surfaced) baseballs show the Magnus effect, but smooth spheres do not. Further study has shown that certain combinations of conditions result in turbulence in the fluid on one side of the rotating body but laminar flow on the other side. In these cases, called the inverse Magnus effect, the deflection is opposite to that of the typical Magnus effect.

== Magnus effect in potential flow ==
Potential flow is a mathematical model of the steady flow of a fluid with no viscosity or vorticity present. For potential flow around a circular cylinder, it provides the following results:

=== Non-spinning cylinder ===
Streamlines for the potential flow around a circular cylinder in a uniform flow.

The flow pattern is symmetric about a horizontal axis through the centre of the cylinder. At each point above the axis and its corresponding point below the axis, the spacing of streamlines is the same so velocities are also the same at the two points. Bernoulli's principle shows that, outside the boundary layers, pressures are also the same at corresponding points. There is no lift acting on the cylinder.

=== Spinning cylinder ===
Streamlines for the potential flow around a spinning cylinder. The concentric circular streamlines of a free vortex have been superimposed on the parallel streamlines of a uniform flow.

Streamlines are closer spaced immediately above the cylinder than below, so the air flows faster past the upper surface than past the lower surface. Bernoulli's principle shows that the pressure adjacent to the upper surface is lower than the pressure adjacent to the lower surface. The Magnus force acts vertically upwards on the cylinder.

Streamlines immediately above the cylinder are curved with radius little more than the radius of the cylinder. This means there is low pressure close to the upper surface of the cylinder. Streamlines immediately below the cylinder are curved with a larger radius than streamlines above the cylinder. This means there is higher pressure acting on the lower surface than on the upper.

Air immediately above and below the cylinder is curving downwards, accelerated by the pressure gradient. A downwards force is acting on the air.

Newton's third law predicts that the Magnus force and the downwards force acting on the air are equal in magnitude and opposite in direction.

== History ==
The effect is named after German physicist Heinrich Gustav Magnus, who demonstrated the effect with a rapidly rotating brass cylinder and an air blower in 1852. Isaac Newton was the first to observe and explain the effect in 1672 after observing tennis players at a Cambridge college. In 1742, Benjamin Robins, a British mathematician, ballistics researcher, and military engineer, explained deviations in the trajectories of musket balls due to their rotation.

Pioneering wind tunnel research on the Magnus effect was carried out with smooth rotating spheres in 1928. Lyman Briggs later studied baseballs in a wind tunnel, and others have produced images of the effect. The studies show that a turbulent wake behind the spinning ball causes aerodynamic drag, plus there is a noticeable angular deflection in the wake, and this deflection is in the direction of spin.

== In sport ==
Magnus effect on Roberto Carlos' famous "banana kick"

An animated diagram of a 12–6 curveball

The Magnus effect explains commonly observed deviations from the typical trajectories or paths of spinning balls in sport, notably association football, table tennis, tennis, volleyball, golf, baseball, and cricket.

The curved path of a golf ball known as slice or hook is largely due to the ball's spin axis being tilted away from the horizontal due to the combined effects of club face angle and swing path, causing the Magnus effect to act at an angle, moving the ball away from a straight line in its trajectory. Backspin (upper surface rotating backwards from the direction of movement) on a golf ball causes a vertical force that counteracts the force of gravity slightly, and enables the ball to remain airborne a little longer than it would were the ball not spinning: this allows the ball to travel farther than a ball not spinning about its horizontal axis.

In table tennis, the Magnus effect is easily observed, because of the small mass and low density of the ball. An experienced player can place a wide variety of spins on the ball. Table tennis rackets usually have a surface made of rubber to give the racket maximum grip on the ball to impart a spin.

In cricket, the Magnus effect contributes to the types of motion known as drift, dip and lift in spin bowling, depending on the axis of rotation of the spin applied to the ball. The Magnus effect is not responsible for the movement seen in conventional swing bowling, in which the pressure gradient is not caused by the ball's spin, but rather by its raised seam, and the asymmetric roughness or smoothness of its two halves; however, the Magnus effect may be responsible for so-called "Malinga Swing", as observed in the bowling of the swing bowler Lasith Malinga.

In airsoft, a system known as hop-up is used to create a backspin on a fired BB, which greatly increases its range, using the Magnus effect in a similar manner as in golf.

In baseball, pitchers often impart different spins on the ball, causing it to curve in the desired direction due to the Magnus effect. The PITCHf/x system measures the change in trajectory caused by Magnus in all pitches thrown in Major League Baseball.

The match ball for the 2010 FIFA World Cup has been criticised for the different Magnus effect from previous match balls. The ball was described as having less Magnus effect and as a result flies farther but with less controllable swerve.

== In external ballistics ==
The Magnus effect can also be found in advanced external ballistics. First, a spinning bullet in flight is often subject to a crosswind, which can be simplified as blowing from either the left or the right. In addition to this, even in completely calm air a bullet experiences a small sideways wind component due to its yawing motion. This yawing motion along the bullet's flight path means that the nose of the bullet points in a slightly different direction from the direction the bullet travels. In other words, the bullet "skids" sideways at any given moment, and thus experiences a small sideways wind component in addition to any crosswind component.

The combined sideways wind component of these two effects causes a Magnus force to act on the bullet, which is perpendicular both to the direction the bullet is pointing and the combined sideways wind. In a very simple case where we ignore various complicating factors, the Magnus force from the crosswind would cause an upward or downward force to act on the spinning bullet (depending on the left or right wind and rotation), causing deflection of the bullet's flight path up or down, thus influencing the point of impact.

Overall, the effect of the Magnus force on a bullet's flight path itself is usually insignificant compared to other forces such as aerodynamic drag. However, it greatly affects the bullet's stability, which in turn affects the amount of drag, how the bullet behaves upon impact, and many other factors. The stability of the bullet is affected, because the Magnus effect acts on the bullet's centre of pressure instead of its centre of gravity. This means that it affects the yaw angle of the bullet; it tends to twist the bullet along its flight path, either towards the axis of flight (decreasing the yaw thus stabilising the bullet) or away from the axis of flight (increasing the yaw thus destabilising the bullet). The critical factor is the location of the centre of pressure, which depends on the flowfield structure, which in turn depends mainly on the bullet's speed (supersonic or subsonic), but also the shape, air density and surface features. If the centre of pressure is ahead of the centre of gravity, the effect is destabilizing; if the centre of pressure is behind the centre of gravity, the effect is stabilising.

== In aviation ==
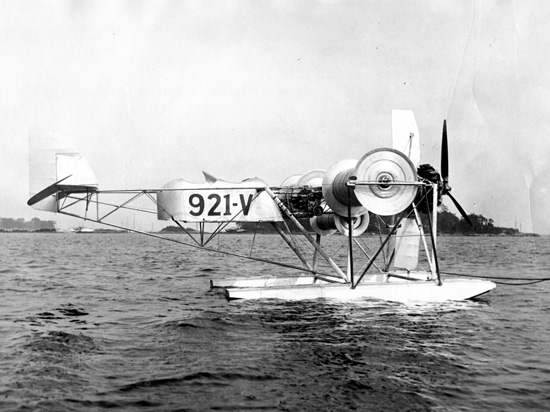
Anton Flettner's rotor aircraft

Some aircraft, called Flettner airplanes, have been built to use the Magnus effect to create lift with a rotating cylinder instead of a wing, allowing flight at lower horizontal speeds. The earliest attempt to use the Magnus effect for a heavier-than-air aircraft was in 1910 by a US member of Congress, Butler Ames of Massachusetts. The next attempt was in the early 1930s by three inventors in New York state.

== Ship propulsion and stabilization ==
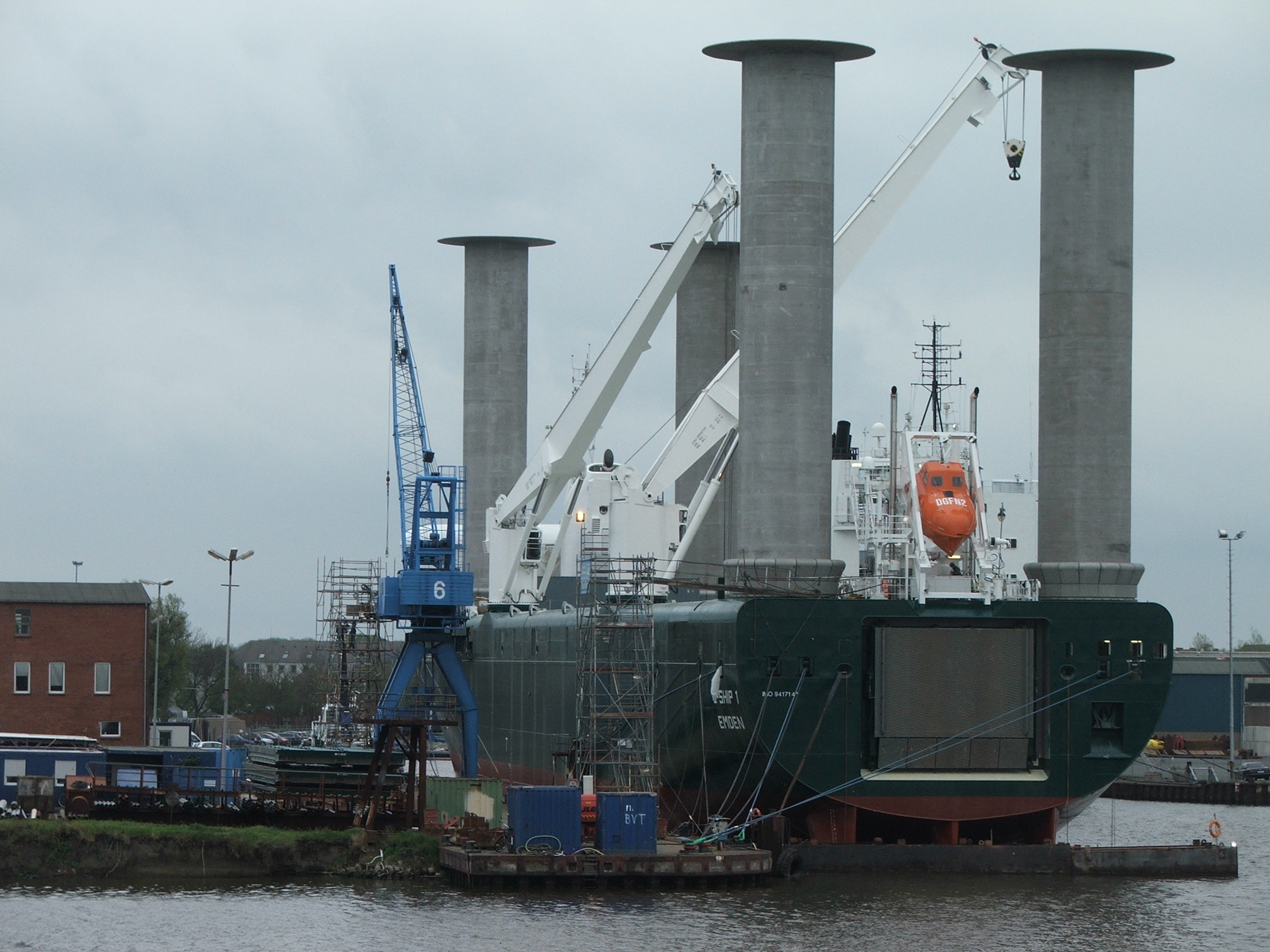
E-Ship 1 with Flettner rotors mounted

Rotor ships use mast-like cylinders, called Flettner rotors, for propulsion. These are mounted vertically on the ship's deck. When the wind blows from the side, the Magnus effect creates a forward thrust. Thus, as with any sailing ship, a rotor ship can only move forwards when there is a wind blowing. The effect is also used in a special type of ship stabilizer consisting of a rotating cylinder mounted beneath the waterline and emerging laterally. By controlling the direction and speed of rotation, strong lift or downforce can be generated. The largest deployment of the system to date is in the motor yacht Eclipse.

== See also ==
- Air resistance
- Ball of the Century
- Bernoulli's principle
- Coandă effect
- Fluid dynamics
- Kite types
- Navier–Stokes equations
- Potential flow around a circular cylinder
- Reynolds number
- Tesla turbine
