= Breadwinner (disambiguation) =

Breadwinner typically refers to the breadwinner model, a system where one family member earns money to support the others.

Breadwinner or Breadwinners may also refer to:

== Books ==
- The Bread-Winner (play), a 1930 play by William Somerset Maugham
- The Bread Winner, a 1990 novel by Arvella Whitmore
- The Breadwinner (novel), a 2000 children's book by Deborah Ellis
- The Bread-Winners, an 1883 novel by John Hay

== Film, television and video games ==
- "Breadwinner" (Birds of a Feather), an episode of the British sitcom Birds of a Feather
- Breadwinners (TV series), a 2014 animated series from Nickelodeon
- Breadwinner, a Splicer model in the video games BioShock and BioShock 2
- The Breadwinner (2017 film), an Irish-Canadian animated film
- The Breadwinner (2026 film), an American comedy film

== Music ==
- Breadwinner (band), an American math rock band
- Ovation Breadwinner, a solid-body electric guitar made by the Ovation Guitar Company
- Bread Winners (album), a 1972 album by Jack Jones
- The Breadwinner, an album by Shannon Stephens
- "Breadwinner", 1965 tune by Kenny Burrell from the album Guitar Forms
- "Breadwinner", a song by Kacey Musgraves from the 2021 album Star-Crossed
