= Kaman K-17 =

1950s helicopter

K-17

General information
- Type: Experimental helicopter
- Manufacturer: Kaman Aircraft
- Status: Retired
- Number built: 1

History
- First flight: 1958

The Kaman K-17 was a two-seat experimental helicopter built by Kaman in the late 1950s. It used a cold-jet rotor system.

== Specifications ==
Data from Jane's All the World's Aircraft 1958-59

General characteristics

- Crew: 2
- Capacity: 700 lb (318 kg) payload
- Empty weight: 950 lb (431 kg)
- Max takeoff weight: 2,000 lb (907 kg)
- Fuel capacity: 54 US gal (45 imp gal; 200 L) in a single keel mounted tank
- Powerplant: 1 × Blackburn-Turbomeca Turmo 600 turboshaft, 400 shp (300 kW) maximum rating

350 shp (261.0 kW) maximum continuous rating
driving a Boeing 502 compressor to supply compressed air to the rotor tip-jets

- Main rotor diameter: 37 ft 0 in (11.28 m)
- Main rotor area: 962.24 sq ft (89.395 m^{2}) driven by compressed air tip-jets

Performance

- Cruise speed: 92 mph (148 km/h, 80 kn)
- Endurance: 2 hours 15 minutes at sea level
- Service ceiling: 5,000 ft (1,500 m) hover ceiling
- Rate of climb: 1,260 ft/min (6.4 m/s)
