= Auxiliary power unit =

Alternative vehicle power source

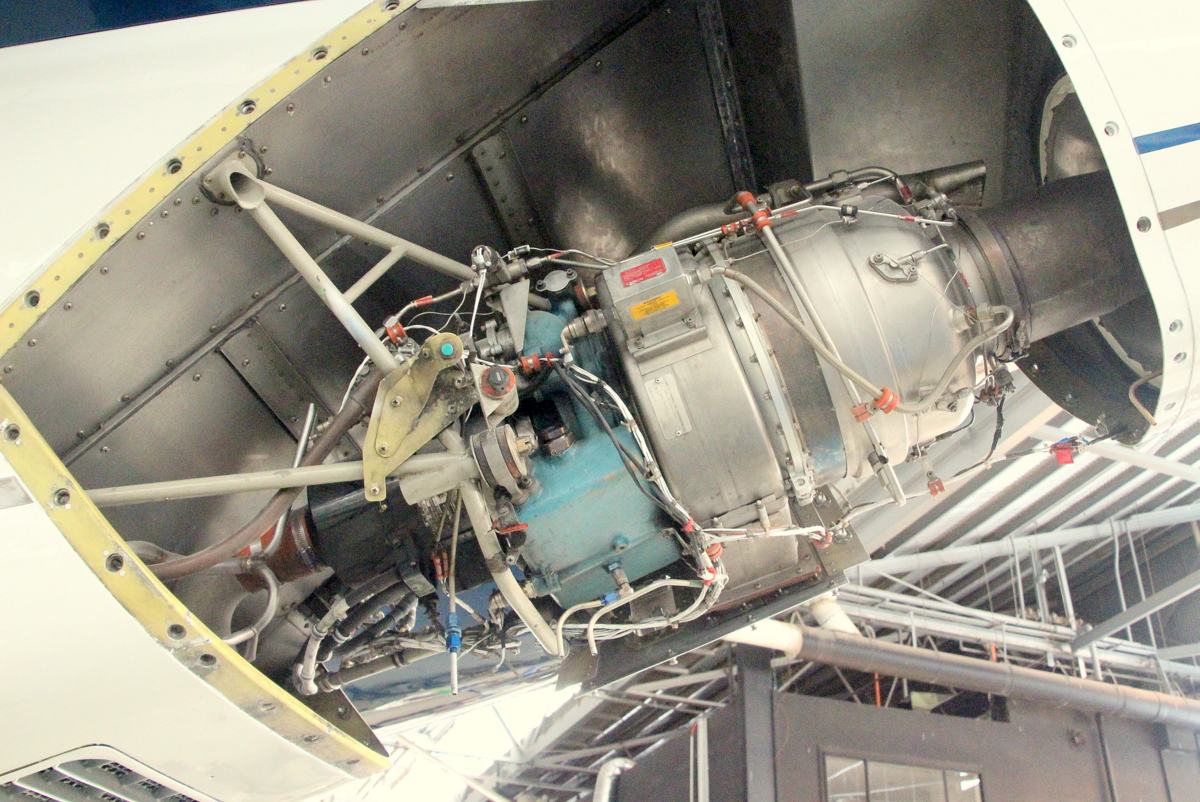
A Honeywell GTCP36 APU mounted in the tail of a business jet

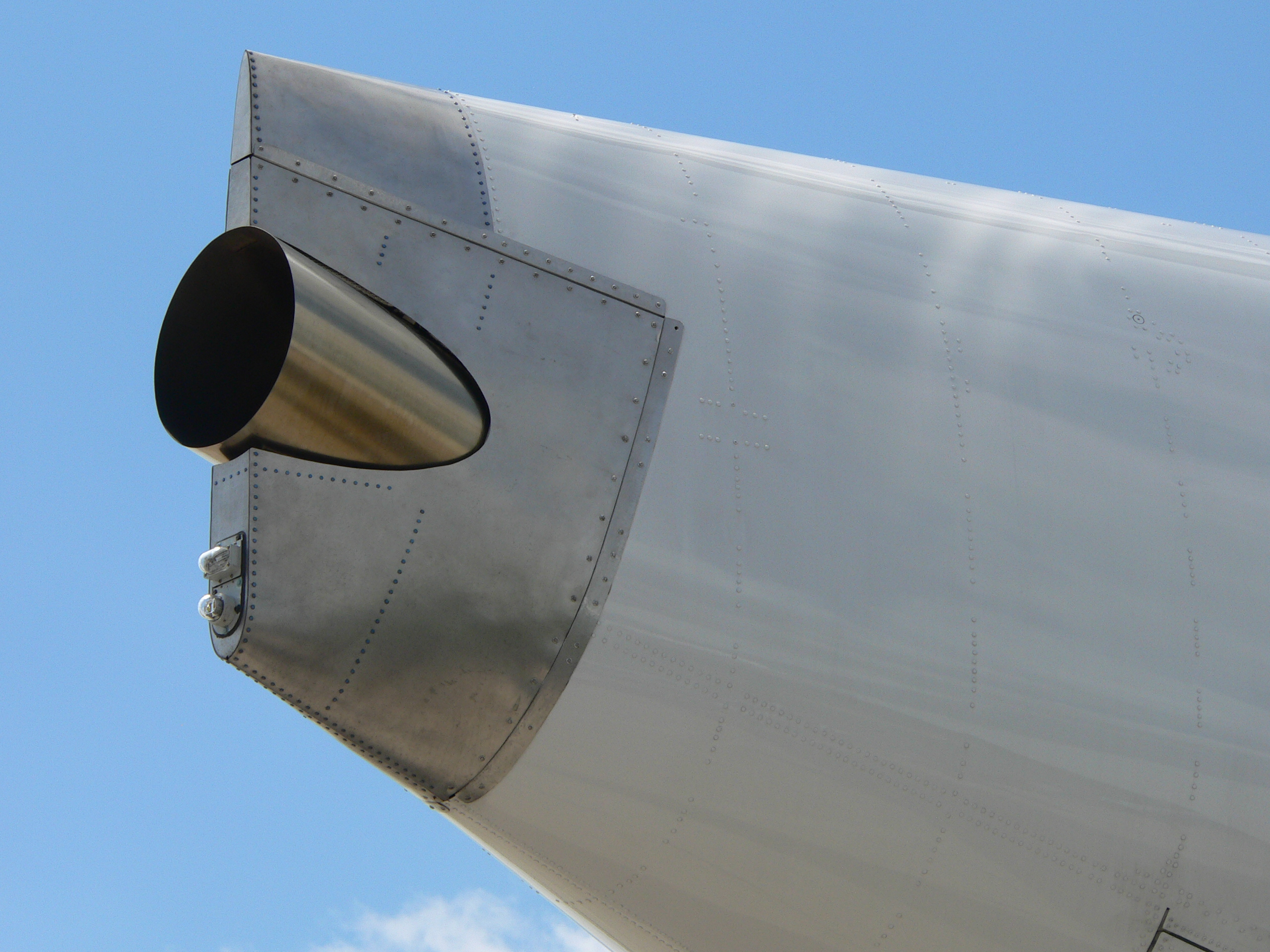
The APU exhaust in the tailcone of an Airbus A380

An auxiliary power unit (APU) is a device on a vehicle that provides energy for functions other than propulsion. They are commonly found on large aircraft, naval ships and some large land vehicles. Aircraft APUs generally produce 115 V AC at 400 Hz (rather than the 50 or 60 Hz common in mains supplies), to run the electrical systems of the aircraft; others can produce 28 V DC. APUs can provide power through single- or three-phase systems. A jet fuel starter (JFS) is a device similar to an APU but directly linked to a main engine and started by an onboard compressed air bottle.

== Aircraft ==
=== History ===
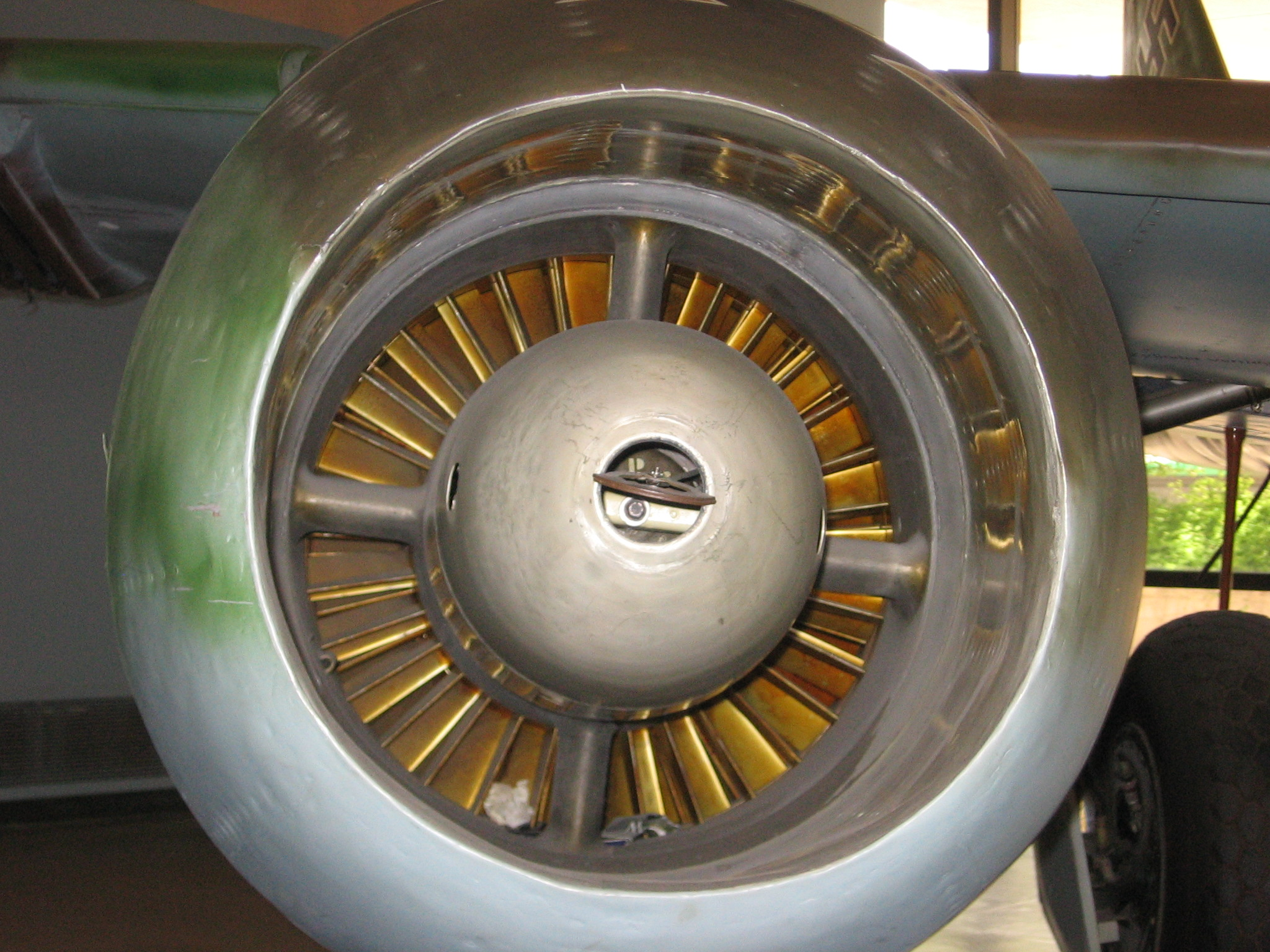
The intake diverter of the Jumo 004, with pullcord starter handle for Riedel APU and its sparkplug access ports

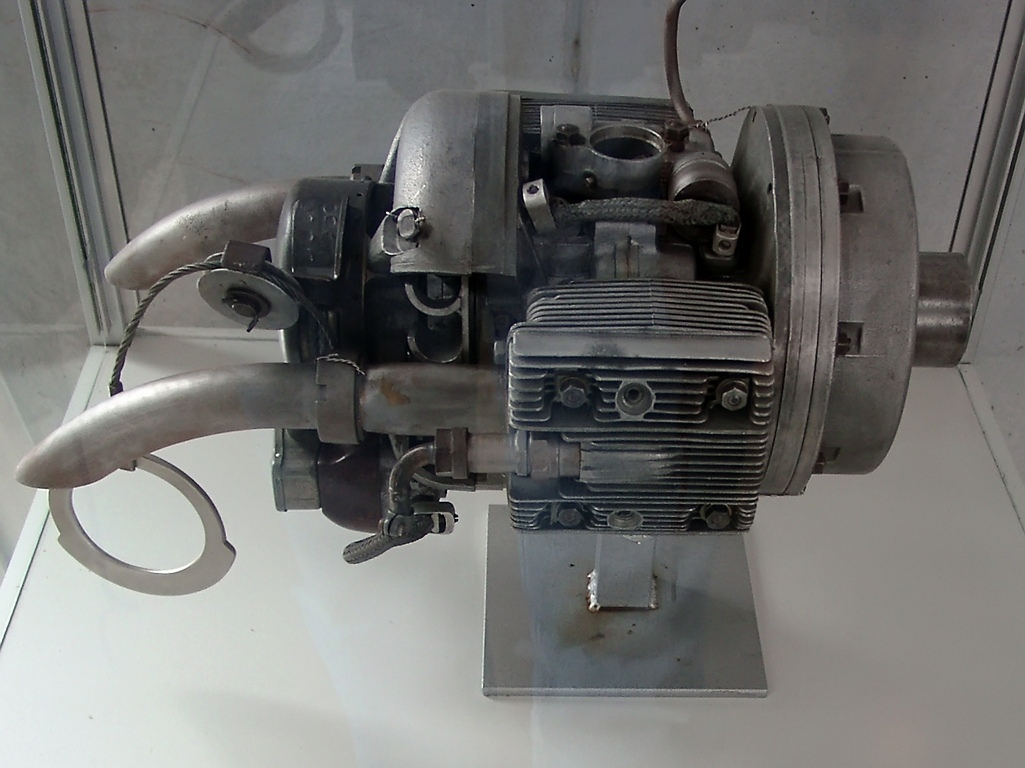
The Riedel two-stroke engine used as the pioneering example of an APU, to turn over the central shaft of both World War II-era German BMW 003 and Junkers Jumo 004 jet engines (pullcord starter variant shown)

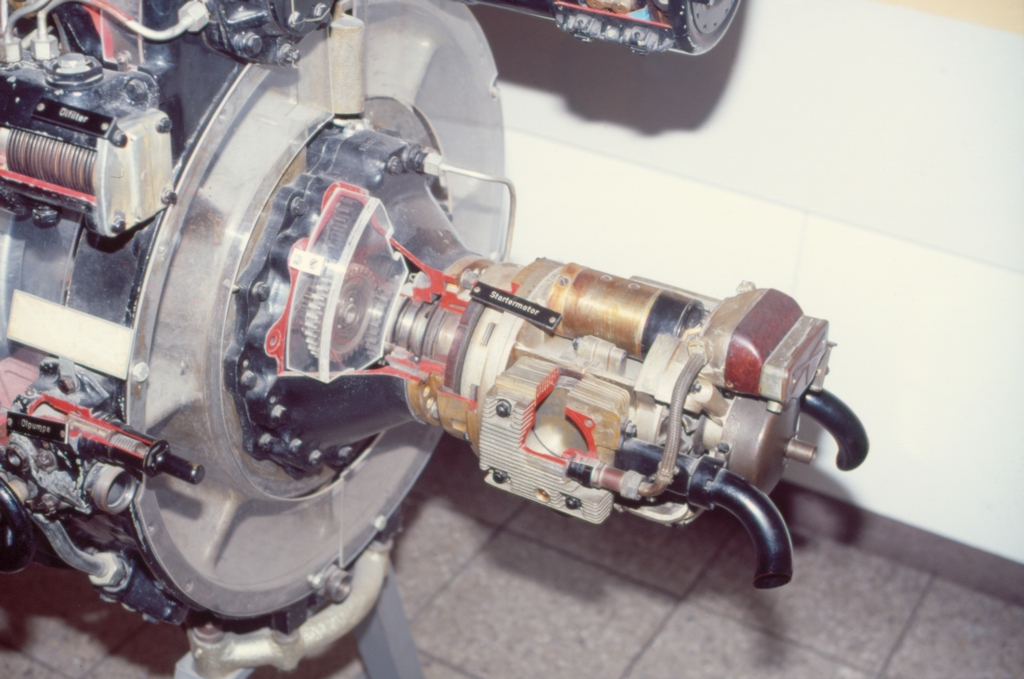
The Riedel APU installed on a preserved BMW 003 jet engine (electric starter variant shown)

During World War I, the British Coastal class blimps, one of several types of airship operated by the Royal Navy, carried a 1.75 horsepower (1.30 kW) ABC auxiliary engine. These powered a generator for the craft's radio transmitter and, in an emergency, could power an auxiliary air blower. (Note: A continuous supply of pressurized air was needed to keep the airship's Ballonets inflated, and so maintain the structure of the gasbag. In normal flight, this was collected from the propeller slipstream by an air scoop.) One of the first military fixed-wing aircraft to use an APU was the British, World War 1, Supermarine Nighthawk, an anti-Zeppelin night fighter.

During World War II, a number of large American military aircraft were fitted with APUs. These were typically known as putt–putts, even in official training documents. The putt-putt on the B-29 Superfortress bomber was fitted in the unpressurised section at the rear of the aircraft. Various models of four-stroke flat-twin or V-twin engines were used. The 7-horsepower (5.2 kW) engine drove a P2, DC generator, rated 28.5 volts and 200 amps (several of the same P2 generators, driven by the main engines, were the B-29's DC power source in flight). The putt-putt provided power for starting the main engines and was used after take-off to a height of 10,000 feet (3,000 m). The putt-putt was restarted when the B-29 was descending to land.

Some models of the B-24 Liberator had a putt–putt fitted at the front of the aircraft, inside the nose-wheel compartment. Some models of the Douglas C-47 Skytrain transport aircraft carried a putt-putt under the cockpit floor.

==== As mechanical "startup" APUs for jet engines ====
The first German jet engines built during the Second World War used a mechanical APU starting system designed by the German engineer Norbert Riedel. It consisted of a 10 horsepower (7.5 kW) two-stroke flat engine, which for the Junkers Jumo 004 design was hidden in the engine nose cone, essentially functioning as a pioneering example of an auxiliary power unit for starting a jet engine. A hole in the extreme nose of the cone contained a manual pull-handle which started the piston engine, which in turn rotated the compressor. Two spark plug access ports existed in the Jumo 004's nose cone to service the Riedel unit's cylinders in situ, for maintenance purposes. Two small "premix" tanks for the Riedel's petrol/oil fuel were fitted in the annular intake. The engine was considered an extreme short stroke (bore / stroke: 70 mm / 35 mm = 2:1) design so it could fit within the nose cone of jet engines like the Jumo 004. For reduction it had an integrated planetary gear. It was produced by Victoria in Nuremberg and served as a mechanical APU-style starter for all three German jet engine designs to have made it to at least the prototype stage before May 1945 – the Junkers Jumo 004, the BMW 003 (which uniquely appears to use an electric starter for the Riedel APU), and the prototypes (19 built) of the more advanced Heinkel HeS 011 engine, which mounted it just above the intake passage in the Heinkel-crafted sheetmetal of the engine nacelle nose.

The Boeing 727 in 1963 was the first jetliner to feature a gas turbine APU, allowing it to operate at smaller airports, independent from ground facilities. The APU can be identified on many modern airliners by an exhaust pipe at the aircraft's tail.

=== Sections ===
A typical gas-turbine APU for commercial transport aircraft comprises three main sections:

==== Power section ====
The power section is the gas-generator portion of the engine and produces all the shaft power for the APU. In this section of the engine, air is compressed, mixed with fuel, and ignited to create hot and expanding gases. This gas is highly energetic and is used to spin the turbine, which in turn powers other sections of the engine, such as auxiliary gearboxes, pumps, and electrical generators.

==== Load compressor section ====
The load compressor is generally a shaft-mounted compressor that provides pneumatic power for the aircraft, though some APUs extract bleed air from the power section compressor. There are two actuated devices to help control the flow of air: the inlet guide vanes that regulate airflow to the load compressor and the surge control valve that maintains stable or surge-free operation of the turbo machine.

==== Gearbox section ====
The gearbox transfers power from the main shaft of the engine to an oil-cooled generator for electrical power. Within the gearbox, power is also transferred to engine accessories such as the fuel control unit, the lubrication module, and cooling fan. There is also a starter motor connected through the gear train to perform the starting function of the APU. Some APU designs use a combination starter/generator for APU starting and electrical power generation to reduce complexity.

On the Boeing 787, an aircraft which has greater reliance on its electrical systems, the APU delivers only electricity to the aircraft. The absence of a pneumatic system simplifies the design, but high demand for electricity requires heavier generators.

Onboard solid oxide fuel cell (SOFC) APUs are being researched.

=== Manufacturers ===
The market of Auxiliary power units is dominated by Honeywell, followed by Pratt & Whitney (a subsidiary of RTX Corporation), Motorsich and other manufacturers such as PBS Velká Bíteš, Safran Power Units, Aerosila and Klimov. The 2018 market share varied according to the application platforms:

- Large commercial aircraft: Honeywell 70–80%, Pratt & Whitney 20–30%, others 0–5%
- Regional aircraft: Pratt & Whitney 50–60%, Honeywell 40–50%, others 0–5%
- Business jets: Honeywell 90–100%, others 0–5%
- Helicopters: Pratt & Whitney 40–50%, Motorsich 40–50%, Honeywell 5–10%, Safran Power Units 5–10%, others 0–5%

On June 4, 2018, Boeing and Safran announced their 50–50 partnership to design, build and service APUs after regulatory and antitrust clearance in the second half of 2018. Boeing produced several hundred T50/T60 small turboshafts and their derivatives in the early 1960s. Safran produces helicopters and business jets APUs but stopped the large APUs since Labinal exited the APIC joint venture with Sundstrand in 1996.

A journalist from the online news website FlightGlobal, Stephen Trimble, has stated that Boeing and Safran's advances in the market for APUs pose a threat for the duopoly between Honeywell and Pratt & Whitney. Honeywell has a 65% share of the mainliner APU market and is the sole supplier for the Airbus A350, the Boeing 777 and all single-aisles: the Boeing 737 MAX, Airbus A220 (formerly Bombardier CSeries), Comac C919, Irkut MC-21 and Airbus A320neo since Airbus eliminated the P&WC APS3200 option. P&WC claims the remaining 35% with the Airbus A380, Boeing 787 and Boeing 747-8.

It should take at least a decade for the Boeing/Safran JV to reach $100 million in service revenue. The 2017 market for production was worth $800 million (88% civil and 12% military), while the MRO market was worth $2.4 billion, spread equally between civil and military.

== Spacecraft ==
The Space Shuttle APUs provided hydraulic pressure. The Space Shuttle had three redundant APUs, powered by hydrazine fuel. They were only powered up for ascent, re-entry, and landing. During ascent, the APUs provided hydraulic power for gimballing of the Shuttle's three engines and control of their large valves, and for movement of the control surfaces. During landing, they moved the control surfaces, lowered the wheels, and powered the brakes and nose-wheel steering. Landing could be accomplished with only one APU working. In the early years of the Shuttle there were problems with APU reliability, with malfunctions on three of the first nine Shuttle missions. (Note: Early Shuttle APU malfunctions: STS-2 (November 1981): During a launchpad hold, high oil pressures were discovered in two of the three APUs. The gear boxes needed to be flushed and filters replaced, forcing the launch to be rescheduled.; STS-3 (March 1982): One APU overheated during ascent and had to be shut down, although it later functioned properly during re-entry and landing.; STS-9 (November–December 1983): During landing, two of the three APUs caught fire.)

== Armored vehicles ==
APUs are fitted to some tanks to provide electrical power without the high fuel consumption and large infrared signature of the main engine. As early as World War II, the American M4 Sherman had a small, piston-engine powered APU for charging the tank's batteries, a feature the Soviet-produced T-34 tank did not have. The United States Army Tank Automotive Research, Development and Engineering Center (TARDEC) developed a 100 kg auxiliary power unit (APU) for the M1 Abrams tank to replace a 230 kg battery. The new APU will also be more fuel-efficient than the tank's main engine.

== Commercial vehicles ==
A refrigerated or frozen food semi trailer or train car may be equipped with an independent APU and fuel tank to maintain low temperatures for the cargo while in transit, without the need for an external transport-supplied power source.

On some older diesel engined-equipment, a small gasoline engine (often called a "pony engine") was used instead of an electric motor to start the main engine. The exhaust path of the pony engine was typically arranged so as to warm the intake manifold of the diesel, to ease starting in colder weather. These were primarily used on large pieces of construction equipment.

=== Fuel cells ===
In recent years, truck and fuel cell manufacturers have teamed up to create, test and demonstrate a fuel cell APU that eliminates nearly all emissions and uses diesel fuel more efficiently. In 2008, a DOE sponsored partnership between Delphi Electronics and Peterbilt demonstrated that a fuel cell could provide power to the electronics and air conditioning of a Peterbilt Model 386 under simulated "idling" conditions for ten hours.

== See also ==
- Air-start system
- Auxiliary hydraulic system
- Coffman engine starter
- Ram air turbine
- Uninterruptible power supply (UPS)
- Alternator
