= Memphis Guitars =

Guitars imported from Asia during the 1970s and 1980s

Memphis Guitars were guitars produced during the late 1970s and throughout the 1980s. They made an inexpensive copy of the Gibson Les Paul; the copy was the first electric guitar owned by Slash as a teenager. The company ceased trading in the United States in 1989.

== Background ==
"Memphis"-branded guitars and signal processors were affordable music gear imported from Asia and distributed in the United States from the mid '70s until the mid '90s by C. Bruno and Sons - which by this time had become a subsidiary of Kaman Music Corporation. The product line included Fender- and Gibson-styled instruments. The Memphis name also appears on various guitar-effects pedals, including delays, reverbs, overdrives, and the Memphis Fuzz. One notable pedal is the Memphis phase shifter, named "Roto Phase", a stompbox featuring single monophonic input and output jacks, and a single knob that controls the speed of the rotating-speaker effect.

As with a number of the Western contract-manufactured brand names, firm evidence in determining the actual factories used to manufacture Memphis guitars is highly challenging. Little to no hard evidence or authoritative testimony from individuals is available. Some Memphis models - particularly early and/or high-end examples - are indeed marked "Made In Japan", and contain Japanese electronic branded components. However later models, although missing country of origin markings, include Korean components like potentiometers, and some instruments were equipped with copies of Bill Lawrence rail humbucker pickups that are known for use in Korean-origin guitars.

In the absence of any factual data, virtually all hearsay conclusions and assertions on guitar forums and groups are based on comparisons to other known-provenance brands and the factories where those brands and models were known to be manufactured. Evidence from model-similarities and hardware component inspection makes it highly likely that multiple contractor factories were used in for various models over time, as it was extremely common for brands like this to make the high end high quality models in one contractor/factory, and to make the cheap low-end student models in another. Inspection of examples suggests strongly that over time manufacture shifted from Japan to Korea, as was the case for many other Western 'house brands'. This theory would be supported by the brand of potentiometers found in varying guitar models.

A common assertion is that early years, Memphis was a house brand manufactured by Matsumoku Industrial of Nagoya, Japan, and/or Matsumoku was contracted to produce Memphis models. There is no evidence - no examples of guitars, or existing catalogs have been shown or cited to support the "house brand" theory. However, a few of the very top-of-the-line "Pharaoh" guitars seen in the 1977 Memphis catalog can be found marked "Made In Japan". Further more, some of these models have unique identifying features (examples: a double cutaway solid body with 'Flying-V' headstock, and a premium Les Paul copy with an ornate mandolin-like headstock) which appear identical to Aria Pro II models which were known to be manufactured at Matsumoku. The bulk of Memphis models however, would be inconsistent with Matsumoku manufacture, both from construction quality, and other tell-tales like style of neck plates, so if some guitars were made by Matsumoku certainly they certainly all were not.

It is also often suggested that original designs were built by Yamaki [which also built guitars under its own Daion brand, as well as for Washburn and other guitar companies]. There are also suggestions based upon the strong similarities between certain Memphis models and other guitars bearing the Washburn brand, that both brands were built at least for a time by Yamaki Gakki. This conclusion is quite debatable, as many of these models also closely resemble guitars built by the Korean manufacturer Cor-Tek (or Cort). Cort is known to have built Washburn copies for the Lotus brand that were long mistaken for Yamaki builds. Furthermore, guitars and basses from the 1982 catalog including the cover page 105D and 102D laminated style guitars, can be found equipped with Jung Poong "JP" potentiometers which was a Korean electronics manufacture. Furthermore, higher end models from this era used Bill Lawrence copy pickups, branded "Fire Power" in Memphis catalogs, and these are well known to be utilized in other known Cort builds.
