= Kaman Corporation =

American aerospace company

Coordinates: 41.859142°N 72.700471°W

- Company type: Private
- Industry: Aerospace industry, medical industry, defense industry
- Founded: December 1945
- Founder: Charles Kaman
- Headquarters: Bloomfield, Connecticut, United States
- Number of locations: 241 offices
- Area served: Worldwide
- Key people: Ross Sealfon (Chairman, President)
- Revenue: ▲US$1.59 billion (FY 2012)
- Operating income: ▲US$92.8 million (FY 2012)
- Net income: ▲US$55.0 million (FY 2012)
- Total assets: ▲US$1.1 billion (FY 2012)
- Total equity: ▲US$42.1 billion (FY 2012)
- Owner: Arcline Investment Management
- Number of employees: 2,000+
- Divisions: Bal Seal Engineering EXTEX Engineered Products GRW Kaman Air Vehicles Kaman Composites Kaman Fuzing Kaman Measuring Kamatics RWG
- Website: kaman.com

Kaman Corporation /kəˈmɑːn/ is an American aerospace company, with headquarters in Bloomfield, Connecticut. It was founded in 1945 by Charles Kaman. During the first ten years the company operated exclusively as a designer and manufacturer of several helicopters that set world records and achieved many aviation firsts.

In 1956, Kaman began to diversify as an aerospace subcontractor of McDonnell Douglas, Grumman, and others. In the mid-1960s Kaman diversified outside of the aerospace industry, using the expertise Kaman had gained in composite materials and the end of the need for skilled woodworkers to craft wooden rotor blades. Charles Kaman, a guitarist as well as an aerospace pioneer, worked with his engineers and other musicians to create the round-backed, composite-body Ovation guitar, which led to the eventual creation of Kaman Music, a major distributor and manufacturer of musical instruments and accessories.

== History ==
Charles Kaman founded the company in December 1945 with $2,000 of capital and his invention of the servo-flap controlled rotor.

January 15, 1947
K-125 - Kaman's first helicopter; Kaman selected an intermeshed contrarotating twin rotor design.

July 1949
K-225 - An improved version of the K-125; the U.S. Navy bought two and the U.S. Coast Guard one for $25,000 each. Later, they received the H-22 designation.

December 1951
A modified K-225 equipped with a Boeing 502 (YT50) turboshaft engine becomes the world's first gas turbine powered helicopter. This aircraft is now at the Smithsonian Institution's National Air and Space Museum.

1953
Kaman produced the first electrically-powered drone.

April 1953
Ordered for the U.S. Marine Corps, the HOK-1 first flies; Air Force version was the H-43A Huskie.

1954
K-16 A V/STOL designed around a rotoprop.

March 1954
A modified Kaman HTK-1 becomes the world's first twin-turbine powered helicopter.

September, 1956
HH-43 Huskie — A variant of the OH-43, equipped with a Lycoming T-53 gas turbine engine.

July 1957
QH-43 - A HTK-1 modified as a UAV.
In the late 1950s, Kaman built the Kaman K-17, an experimental tip jet powered helicopter. using a Blackburn Aircraft-built Turbomeca Turmo turbine powering a compressor delivering cold air to the rotor tips.

July 2, 1959
The HU2K-1, selected by the U.S. Navy as a general purpose naval helicopter, makes its first flight. It enters service as the UH-2A Seasprite in 1962.

March 1960
Kaman develops and flies the first all-composite main rotor blade.
In October 1961 the H-43 Huskie set an altitude record of 10,000 m (33,000 ft) and rate of climb records. Anton Flettner who emigrated to the United States and became the chief designer for Kaman Aircraft, creating the Kaman HH-43 Huskie.

During the Korean and Vietnam Wars, the Huskie flew more rescue missions than all other aircraft combined, with the best safety record of any U.S. military aircraft.

1962
UH-2A / B production begins.

January 1964
First flight of Kaman's experimental Convertiplane equipped with a GE J-85 turbojet engine and wings from a Beechcraft Queen Air. The aircraft achieves speeds of over 320 km/h.

1965
Tomahawk — A Seasprite modified with stub wings and a pair of twin guns side-by-side under the nose. Kaman's proposal for the U.S. Army 's interim gunship helicopter between the AAFSS (AH-56) and AAH (AH-64) competitions. Lost to the Bell 209 (AH-1 HueyCobra).
Due to the limited power of its single engine, the Seasprites are modified for the U.S. Navy into twin-turbine helicopters.

1969
U.S. Navy begins Light Airborne Multi-Purpose System (LAMPS) development to obtain an onboard helicopter for escort ships.

1971
SAVER — The Stowable Aircrew Vehicle Escape Rotoseat is the first jet-powered autogyro with telescoping rotor blades.

May 1973
SH-2F Seasprite — The LAMPS Mk I enters U.S. Navy service.

July 1976
Kaman designs and begins manufacturing the K-747 blade, the world's first production all-composite rotor blade for the Bell AH-1 Cobra helicopter. Total production exceeds 4,000 blades.

January 1991
Magic Lantern, a new laser-based mine countermeasures system, is deployed in the Persian Gulf during Operation Desert Storm. It is highly successful in locating mines.

February 1993
SH-2G Super Seasprite — The new version of the Seasprite, with new avionics, mission electronics, and GE T-700 engines, enters U.S. Navy service.

August 1994
K-1200 K-MAX — a purpose-built helicopter with intermeshing rotors specializing in external load operations.

November 1998
The Egyptian Air Force accepts delivery of its 10th SH-2G Super Seasprite for use in anti-submarine warfare missions, completing the order and becoming the first international customer to operate the aircraft.

August 1999
New Zealand approves purchase of SH-2G(NZ).

January 2000
Australian SH-2G(A) begins initial flight testing.

January 2001
U.S. federal government purchases 5 K-MAX for Peru.

July 24, 2002
Kaman Acquires RWG Frankenjura-Industrie Flugwerklager GmbH, a manufacturer of spherical and ball bearings, rod ends, bushings and specialty components primarily for the aerospace industry.

October 2002
The 5 Peruvian K-MAX are transferred to the Colombian Army where they are still in service as of 2008.

June 2008
All Royal Australian Navy SH-2G Seasprite helicopters are withdrawn from service and returned to supplier as budget blew-out and contract specifications unable to be met.
Kaman acquires Brookhouse Holdings Limited, a world leading composite development company based in the United Kingdom, and renames it Kaman Composites UK Ltd.

January 31, 2011
Charles Kaman, founder of Kaman Aircraft, died in Bloomfield, Connecticut.

November 2015
Kaman announces that it was acquiring GRW Bearing GmbH for $142.9 million. GRW designs and manufactures precision ball bearings, and has production facilities in Europe.

August 26, 2019
Kaman announced that it has completed the sale of its "KAMAN Distribution Group" segment to affiliates of Littlejohn & Co. for total cash consideration of $700 million

January 20, 2020
Kaman completes acquisition of Bal Seal Engineering Inc., which designs, develops, and manufactures highly engineered products including precision springs, seals, and contacts.

May 2022
Kaman announced it had acquired Parker-Hannifin's aircraft wheel and brake division for $440 million US.

January 18, 2023
Kaman Corporation announced it will end the K-MAX production line, citing “low demand and variation in annual deliveries, coupled with low profitability and large working capital inventory requirements”, according to an 18 January statement.

January 19, 2024
Kaman agreed to be acquired by private equity firm Arcline Investment Management for $1.29 billion.

April 19, 2024
It was announced that Arcline Investment Management, L.P. had completed its purchase of the company for approximately $1.8 billion.

== Products ==
- K-16B
- K-125
- K-190
- K-225
- K-1125
- Kaman HH-43 Huskie/HOK/HUK
- Kaman SH-2 Seasprite
- Kaman SH-2G Super Seasprite
- Kaman K-1200 K-Max
- Kaman KSA-100 SAVER
