= Ventura (Japanese guitars) =

Brand of stringed instruments imported from Japan

Ventura logo

Ventura was a brand of stringed instruments imported from Japan by C. Bruno and Company during the 1960s and 1970s. C. Bruno was bought by Kaman (Ovation) in the early 1980s, after which the brand disappeared. Some of the Ventura guitars were knock-offs of the Martin line, such as the Ventura V-35 appearing similar to the Martin D-35, and the Ventura V-14 / Martin D-14.

The Ventura line included guitars (classical, western, folk, concert, flamenco, electric, electro-acoustic), banjos, mandolins, and bass guitars.

Kaman Industries (parent company of Ovation) actually acquired C Bruno & Son in 1971. Although there isn't much in the way of records from this period, it is believed that Kaman contracted with manufacturers such as "Matsumoku" (parent company of brands such as Aria) from 1971 until the brand was discontinued in 1982. There is also evidence that C. Bruno contracted with other companies before the 1971 Kaman acquisition such as "Kasuga" and others.
