= Hydraulic hammer =

Hydraulic hammer may refer to:

- Breaker (hydraulic), a powerful percussion hammer fitted to an excavator for demolishing hard structures
- Hydraulic hammer, a type of piling hammer
- Trip hammer, a massive powered hammer

== See also ==
- Water hammer, a pressure surge or wave caused when a fluid in motion is forced to stop or change direction suddenly
