= Ovation Deacon =

Electric guitar

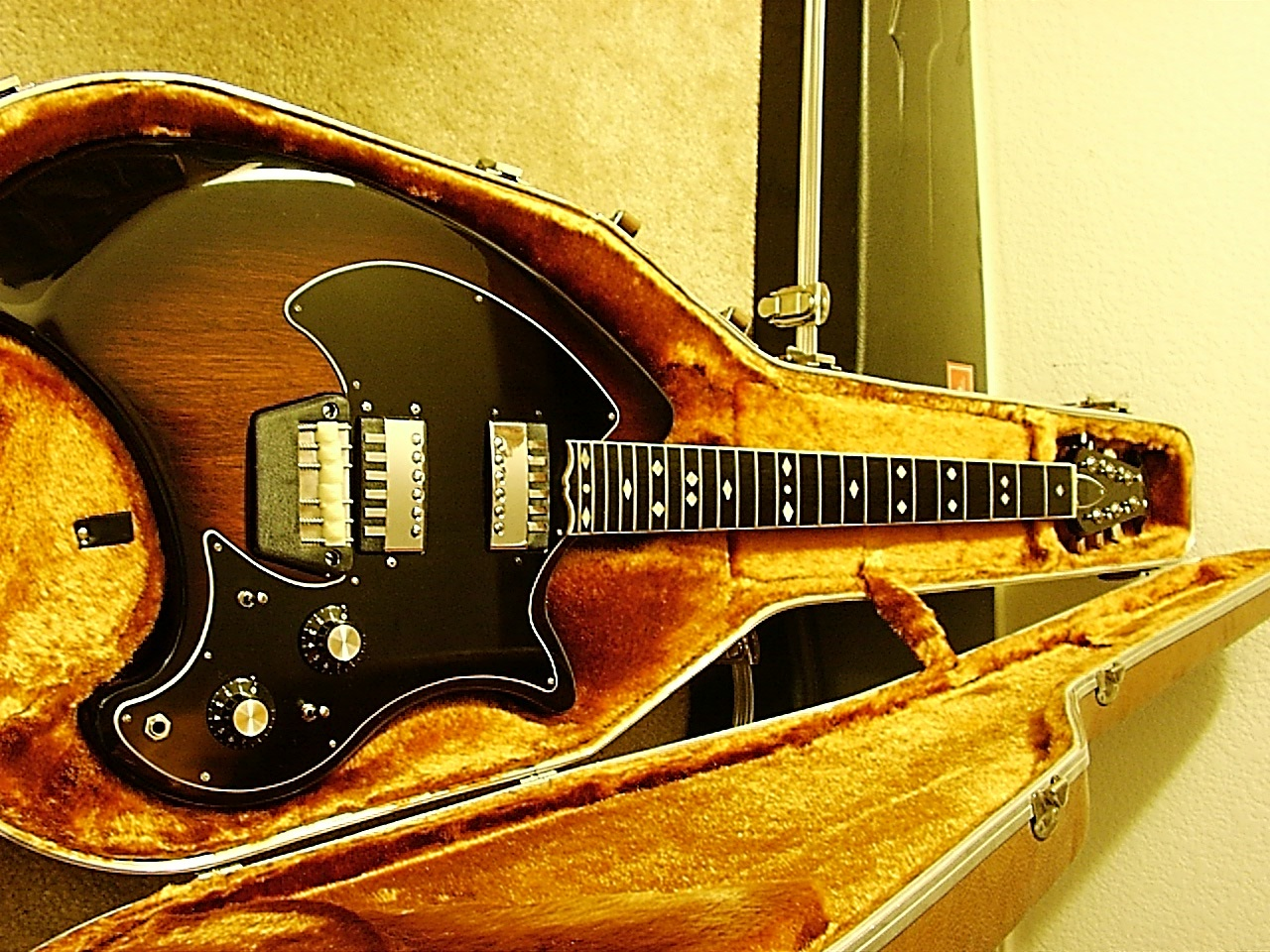
- An example of an Ovation Deacon in its hardshell case (strings removed to more clearly show the finish and hardware)
- Period: 1973-1982

Construction
- Body type: Solid body

Woods
- Body: Mahogany

During the 1970s Ovation Guitar Company created a more "deluxe" version of their exotically shaped solid body electric guitar - the Ovation Breadwinner that was called the Deacon.

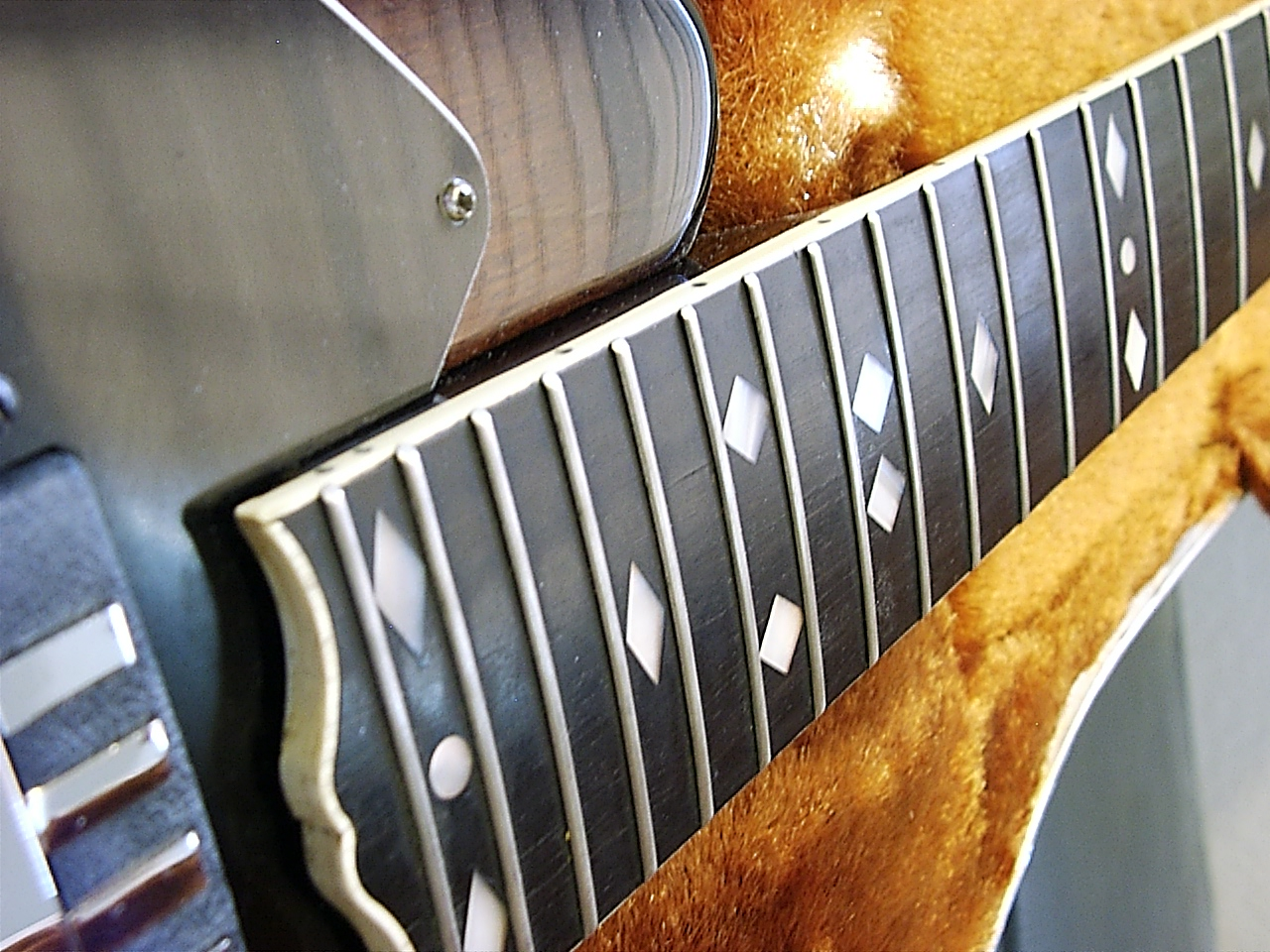
An example of the ivory binding and mother of pearl fret marker inlays

The Deacon was differentiated by a gloss finish, mother of pearl diamond shaped fretboard marker inlays, and an ivory binding on the edge of the fretboard. On the other hand, the Breadwinner had a textured finish created by coating the mahogany body with the company's "LyraChord" material - the same material used to create the bowls of their acoustic and acoustic-electric hollow body guitars and the helicopter blades from the Kaman Company - plastic dot fretboard marker inlays, and no binding. Less obvious differences include a higher quality hardware in the form of the tuners. A gold plated tuner set were available along with a brass bridge saddle just before the design's end of life.

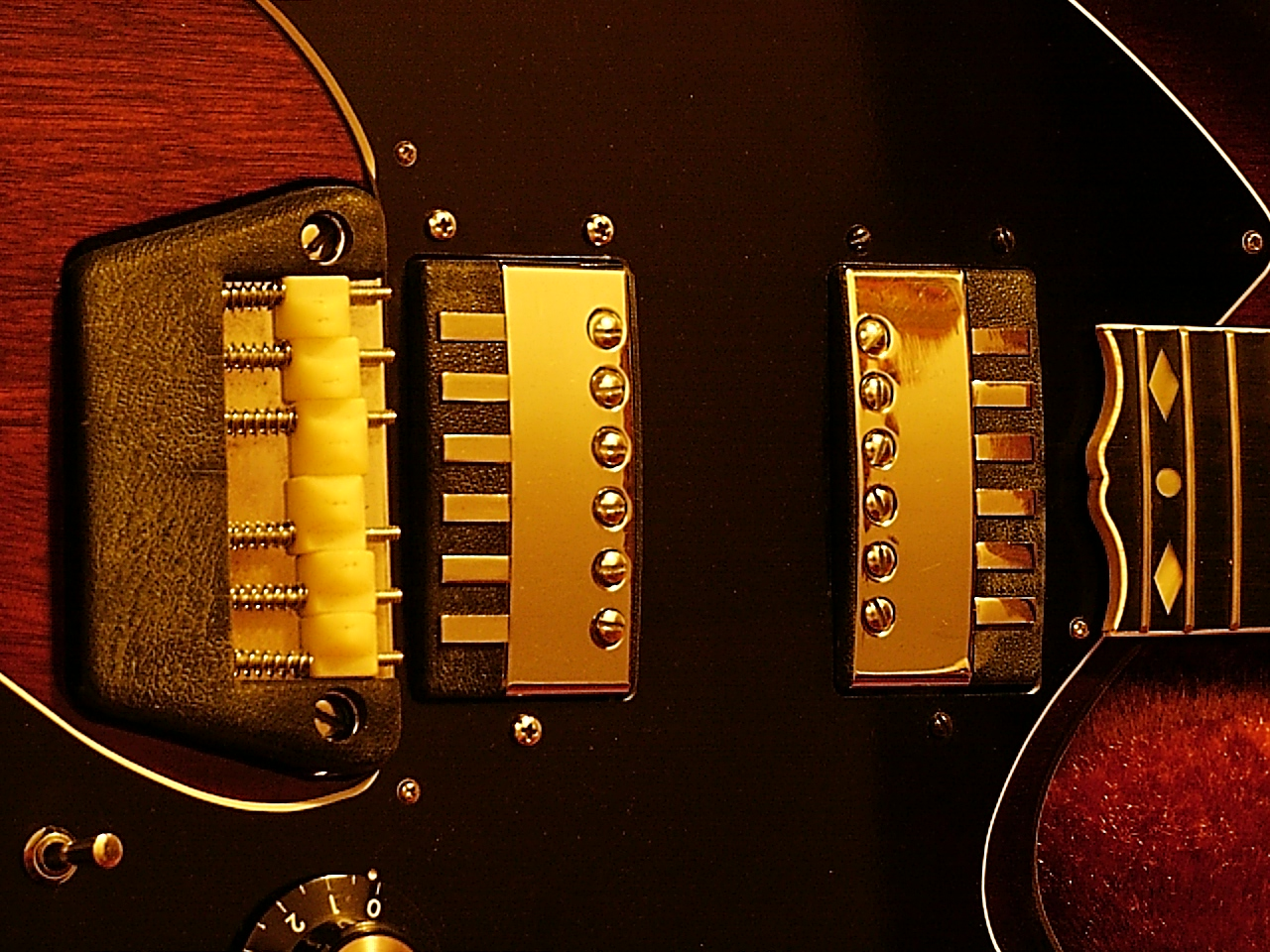
The early model Bridge with nylon saddles and toroidal pickups

Like the Breadwinner, early models utilized Ovation's "toroidal" dual pole, single wound pickups with the original FET preamp. During the 1972 and 1973 model years, these pickups were gradually phased out and replaced with new humbucker, twelve pole dual winding pickups. Touted by Ovation as the quietest pickups manufactured at the time, they may have been a step up to a more mainstream design, rather than a true electronics breakthrough. Many owners preferred the sound of the original pickups as providing a warmer tone when compared to the tonal characteristics of the humbuckers.

The Deacon was also available in a 12 string model, which country guitarist Roy Clark played.

The Deacon was manufactured between 1973 and 1982. In the movie for the 1979 Electric Light Orchestra album Discovery, Jeff Lynne is seen playing the Ovation Deacon.
