= Charles Kaman =

American businessman, engineer and inventor

Charles Huron Kaman
- Born: June 15, 1919; Washington, D.C.
- Died: January 31, 2011 (aged 91); Bloomfield, Connecticut, U.S.
- Occupations: Aircraft designer, Musical Instrument designer
- Spouse(s): Helen Kaman (née Sylvander) (1945–1971; divorced); Roberta Kaman (née Hallock; married from 1971 until her death in 2010)
- Children: C. William Kaman II, Steven W. Kaman and Cathleen Kaman Wood

Charles Huron Kaman (/kəˈmɑːn/ kə-MAHN; June 15, 1919 – January 31, 2011) was an American aeronautical engineer, businessman, inventor, and philanthropist, known for his work in rotary-wing flight and also in musical instrument design via the Kaman Music Corporation.

== Biography ==
Charles Huron Kaman was born in 1919 to Charles William Kaman and Mabel Davis Kaman in Washington, D.C., the son of a construction supervisor. He later attended Catholic University of America, gaining an engineering degree magna cum laude in 1940.

=== Helicopters ===
Kaman's first aircraft experience was working for Igor Sikorsky. In 1945, he started his own aircraft company, Kaman Aircraft, to pursue his own designs. In January 1947, the Kaman K-125 helicopter first flew. It utilized intermeshing rotors and Kaman's patented servo-flap rotor control. The Kaman K-225, first flown in 1951, also used intermeshing rotors with servo-flap control and was the world's first helicopter to be powered by a gas turbine.

=== Business ===
Kaman was an aficionado of the guitar, and in 1966, he founded Ovation Instruments. The company would become the Ovation Guitar Company and developed an acoustic guitar using aerospace composite materials, featuring a rounded back design. Kaman also founded Kaman Industrial Technologies, one of the largest industrial distributors in North America. He and his second wife, Roberta, created the Fidelco Guide Dog Foundation, and developed a breed of German Shepherd to act as guide dogs.

=== Marriage and children ===
Kaman's first wife was the former Helen Sylvander. They married in 1945 and divorced in 1971. Later in 1971 he remarried, to Roberta Hallock, who died in 2010. He had three children — C. William Kaman, II; Steven W. Kaman; and Mrs. Cathleen Kaman Wood.

=== Death ===
Kaman died in Bloomfield, Connecticut, on January 31, 2011, at the age of 91. He had suffered from Alzheimer's disease in his last years.

== Awards ==
Kaman was awarded honorary degrees by the University of Connecticut, the University of Hartford, and the University of Colorado. His other honors included:

- National Inventors Hall of Fame (2003)
- Honorary Fellow of the American Helicopter Society (1950)
- Wright Brothers Memorial Trophy (1997)
- National Medal of Technology (1996)
- Naval Aviation Hall of Honor at the National Naval Aviation Museum (1996)
- Department of Defense Distinguished Public Service Medal (1995)
- Honorary Fellow of the Royal Aeronautical Society (1995)
- Kaman's K-225 helicopter is displayed in the Smithsonian Institution's Vertical Flight exhibition at the Steven F. Udvar-Hazy Center in Chantilly, VA. This design was the first helicopter to fly with a gas turbine-driven transmission. <Smithsonian Article on Kaman/13>
- International Air & Space Hall of Fame inductee (1999)

== Sources ==
- Grossnick, Ray (1997). United States Naval Aviation 1910–1995. Washington DC: Naval Historical Center. ISBN 0-16-049124-X.
- "Hall of Fame/Inventor Profile: Charles Kaman". National Inventors Hall of Fame. Archived from the original on January 6, 2009.
- "Historical Charts". Ovation Guitars.
- "Kaman Honour". Flight International: 6. September 13–19, 1995.
- "The National Medal of Technology Recipients: 1996 Laureates". United States Patent and Trademark Office.
- Preston, Anna (2007). Royal Aeronautical Society Handbook 2008. London: Royal Aeronautical Society.
- Wheeler, Tom (1992). American Guitars. New York: HarperCollins. ISBN 0-06-273096-7.
- "Wright Brothers Memorial Trophy > Wright Bros. 1990–1999 Winners". National Aeronautic Association. Archived from the original on May 31, 2011.
