= Rover 1S60 =

Gas turbine

1S60
- Type: Turboshaft
- National origin: United Kingdom
- Manufacturer: Rover Company
- Major applications: Avro Vulcan; Armstrong Whitworth AW.660 Argosy

The Rover 1S60 is a gas turbine manufactured by Rover Company and the first industrial type for production Many were used for aircraft such as Auxiliary power units for groundcrew and Auxiliary Airborne Power Plants on aircraft. Other uses of the Rover 1S60 was used as fire pumps and Auxiliary generators on hovercraft.

== Applications ==
- AAPP MK10201 Argosy
- AAPP MK 10301 Avro Vulcan
- 1S60 fire pump

== Specifications (1S60) ==
==== General characteristics ====
- Type: Centrifugal compressor turbojet
- Length:
- Diameter:
- Dry weight:

==== Components ====
- Compressor:

==== Performance ====
- Maximum power output:

== See also ==
- List of aircraft engines
