= Radioplane RP-77 =

RP-77D
- Radioplane RP-77D target drone
- Type: Target drone
- Place of origin: United States

Service history
- In service: 1958
- Used by: United States Army

Production history
- Manufacturer: Radioplane
- No. built: 24

Specifications
- Mass: 1,050 pounds (480 kg)
- Length: 14.9 feet (4.53 m)
- Wingspan: 15.3 feet (4.66 m)
- Engine: Boeing 502 turboprop 285 shaft horsepower (213 kW)
- Flight ceiling: 47,000 feet (14,000 m)
- Maximum speed: 425 miles per hour (684 km/h)
- Guidance system: Radio

The Radioplane RP-77 was a small target drone missile, constructed largely of plastic materials, produced by the Radioplane division of the Northrop Corporation. Although the RP-77D was successfully tested by the United States Army, the decision was made not to procure the aircraft.

== Design and development ==
The development of the RP-77 began in 1955. Similar in outline to Radioplane's earlier OQ-19, four prototypes of the RP-77 were constructed, two each of the RP-77, powered by a four-cylinder McCulloch piston engine, and of the RP-77A, powered by a six-cylinder Lycoming engine. Results of flight-testing were insufficient to interest the U.S. Army, however in 1957 a proposal for an improved RP-77D, powered by a Boeing 502 turboprop, resulted in a contract for the construction of 20 aircraft.

The design of the RP-77D made extensive use of glass-polyester plastic materials. The drone was launched using a rocket-assisted take-off system consisting of four Loki rockets, and was fitted with a radio control apparatus that, with the assistance of radar tracking, allowed the drone to be operated at a considerable distance from its launching point. In addition to equipment typically carried by target drones, the RP-77D could be equipped with reconnaissance or meteorological sensors, or with air sampling equipment. The RP-77D utilised the RPTA tracking system, developed by Radioplane, using audio frequency tones for control. Tip tanks allowed for carriage of additional fuel to extend the aircraft's range, and recovery at the end of the flight was by parachute.

An improved version of the RP-77D was projected, with provision for launching RP-76 target missiles.

== Operational history ==
Following its maiden flight in March 1958, evaluation of the RP-77D by the U.S. Army took place throughout the remainder of that year, nearly 40 test flights being conducted. Although the test results were generally satisfactory, it was determined that the performance of the aircraft was an insufficient improvement over existing types in service to have the aircraft ordered into production, and the project was cancelled, along with the improved RP-86, a dedicated reconnaissance variant.

Following the termination of the Army's evaluation, Radioplane, as a private venture, conducted an improvement program for the RP-77D, fitting the aircraft with a larger wing, along with other modifications that improved the performance of the drone. However these improvements were insufficient to produce a renewed interest from the Army.

== Variants ==
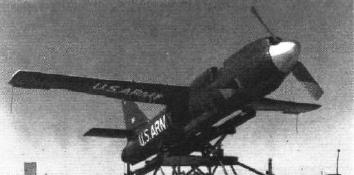
RP-77D being evaluated by the U.S. Army

RP-77
Prototype model powered by McCulloch piston engine; two built.

RP-77A
Prototype model powered by Lycoming IMO-360 piston engine; two built

RP-77B
Proposed version of RP-77 with turbo-supercharged McCulloch engine, none built.

RP-77C
Proposed version of RP-77A with turbo-supercharged Lycoming SO-360M engine, none built.

RP-77D
Production prototype with Boeing 502 turboprop; twenty built for evaluation.

RP-86
Proposed reconnaissance version of RP-77D; none built.

== Specifications (RP-77D) ==
Data from

General characteristics

- Crew: None
- Length: 14 ft 10 in (4.53 m)
- Wingspan: 15 ft 3 in (4.66 m)
- Height: 5 ft 2 in (1.58 m)
- Gross weight: 1,050 lb (476 kg)
- Powerplant: 1 × Boeing 502-10F turboprop, 285 shp (213 kW)
- Propellers: 2-bladed

Performance

- Maximum speed: 425 mph (684 km/h, 369 kn)
- Endurance: One hour at 40,000 feet
- Service ceiling: 47,000 ft (14,000 m)

== See also ==
Aircraft of comparable role, configuration, and era

- GAF Jindivik
- Nord Aviation CT20
- Radioplane OQ-19
- Ryan Firebee
