= Auxiliary hydraulic system =

Hydraulic system

An auxiliary hydraulic system delivers pressurized hydraulic fluid from a hydraulic pump to operate auxiliary equipment or attachments. The addition of an auxiliary hydraulic system to heavy construction equipment increases the versatility of the vehicle by allowing it to perform additional functions with different attachments.

== Usage ==
An auxiliary hydraulic system is needed to operate heavy construction attachments, such as:

- Hydraulic breakers
- Hydraulic brush cutters
- Hydraulic compactors
- Hydraulic crushers
- Hydraulic grapples
- Hydraulic processors
- Hydraulic shears
- Hydraulic thumbs
- Hydraulic tilt bucket
- Hydraulic augers

== Configurations ==
Depending upon the vehicle, whether an excavator, a back-hoe or a front-end-loader, the auxiliary hydraulic system may vary. Vehicle interface fittings, length from pump to attachment and vehicle control systems require various configurations of an auxiliary hydraulic system. Auxiliary hydraulic systems usually include external fluid fittings to facilitate connecting and disconnecting the hydraulic fluid supply lines of the attachments to the vehicles' hydraulic pump. They also usually include valves configured to control the supply of hydraulic fluid through the fittings.

== Terminology ==
Auxiliary hydraulic systems are also referred to as auxiliary hydraulics, hydraulic kits, wet kits and plumbing kits.

== See also ==
- Auxiliary power unit
