= Kaman K-225 =

American experimental helicopter

K-225
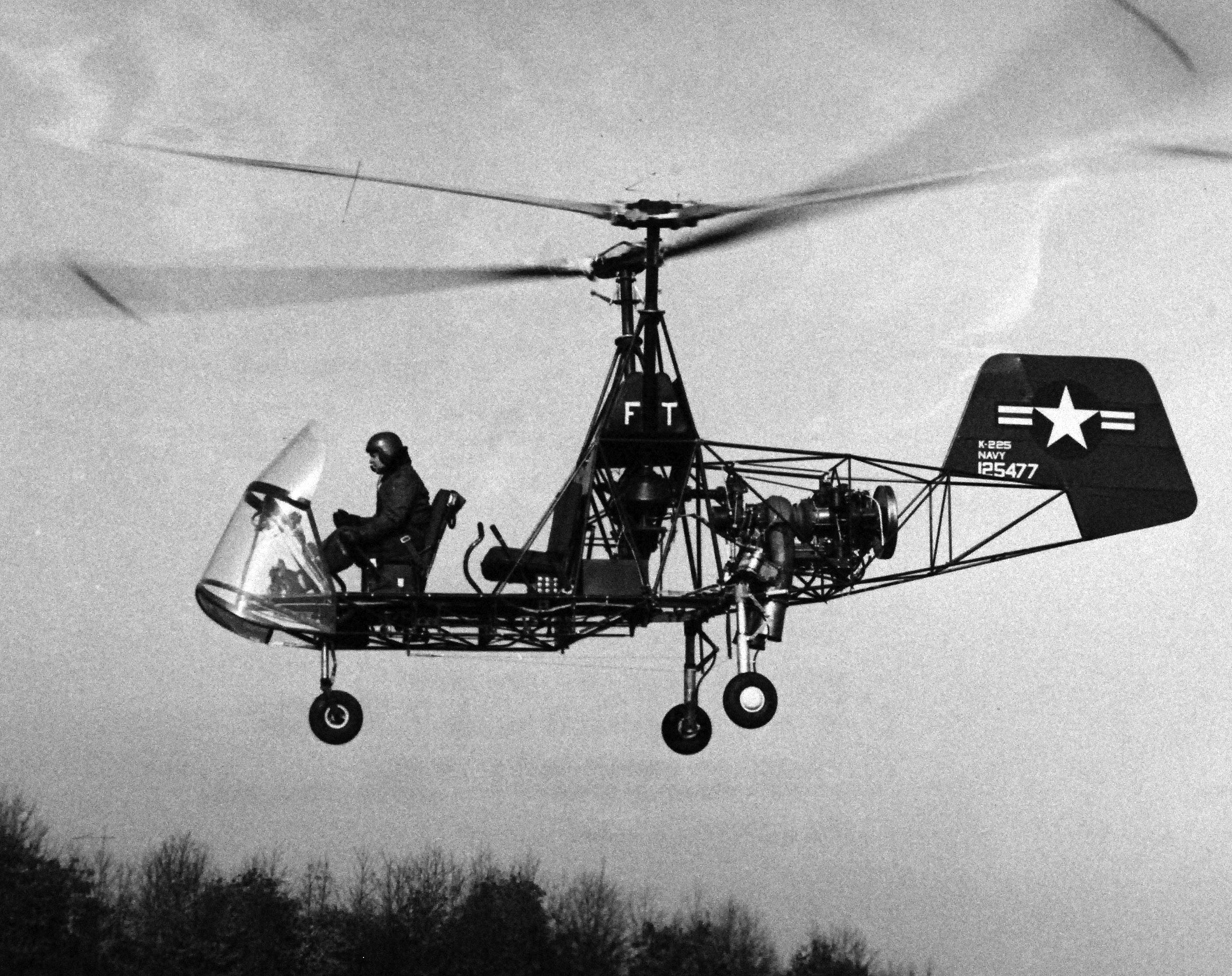
- XHTK-1 modified with a Boeing 502 (YT50) turboshaft engine

General information
- Type: Experimental helicopter
- National origin: United States
- Manufacturer: Kaman Aircraft
- Status: Retired
- Primary users: United States Navy United States Coast Guard
- Number built: 7

History
- First flight: 15 January 1947 (K-125)

The Kaman K-225 is an American experimental helicopter developed by Kaman Aircraft. One example was modified to become the world's first gas turbine-powered helicopter.

== Design and development ==
The K-125 was Charles Kaman's first helicopter, which utilized intermeshing rotors and Kaman's patented servo-flap stability control. The K-125 first flew on 15 January 1947.

The K-190 and K-225 were an improved versions of the K-125, which first flew in April and July 1949 respectively. The U.S. Navy bought two and the Coast Guard one for $25,000 each. The United States Air Force evaluated one K-225 with the designation YH-22.

A modified K-225 equipped with a Boeing 502 (YT50) turboshaft engine became the first gas turbine-powered helicopter in December 1951. This aircraft is now at the Smithsonian Institution in Washington, D.C.

A standard K-225 is preserved in the New England Air Museum at Windsor Locks Connecticut.

In 1953, the Turkish Army purchased one Kaman K-225 helicopter and a K-225 was the first helicopter flown in Turkey.

== Variants ==
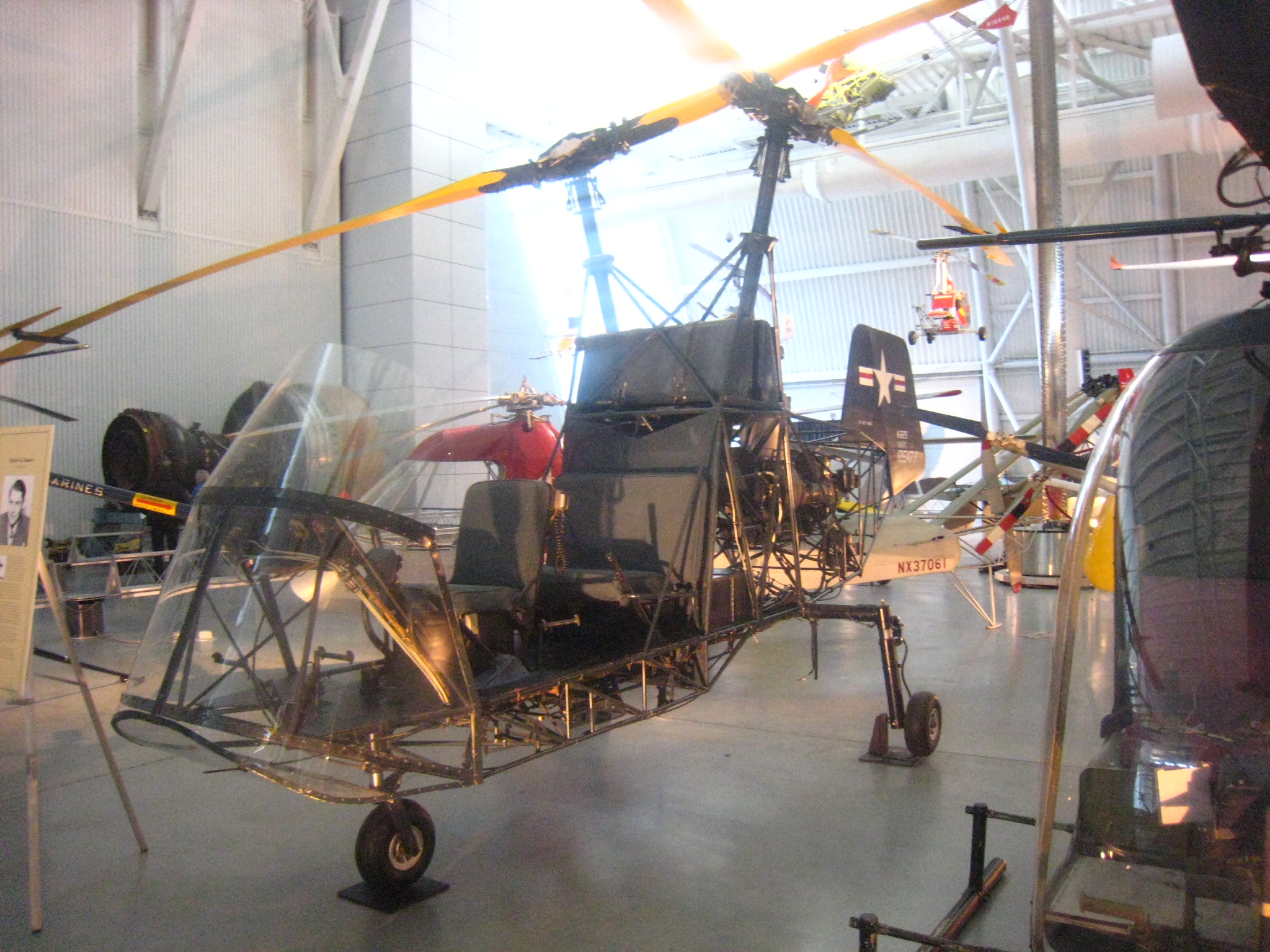
K-225

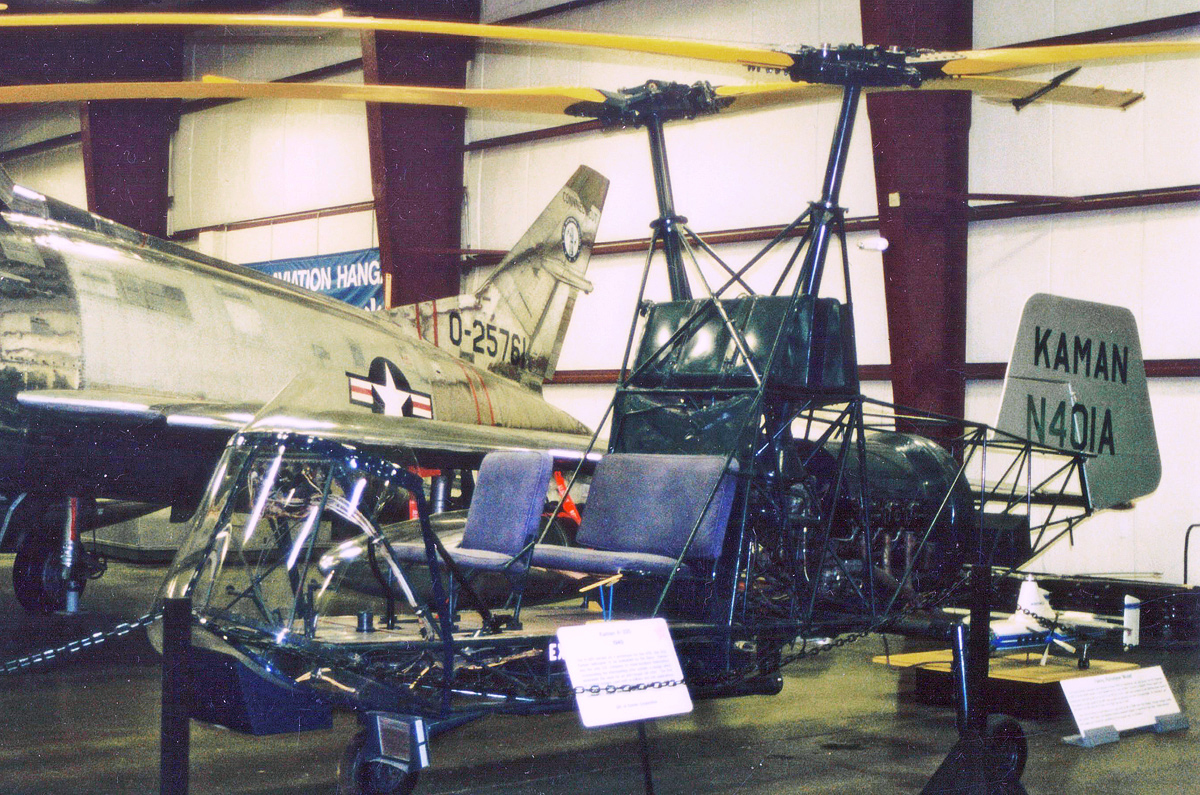
The fifth K-225 to be built displayed at the New England Air Museum, Windsor Locks, Connecticut, in June 2005

K-125
first two-seat prototype with 125 hp (93 kW) Lycoming O-390-3 engine and moulded plywood fuselage and bubble canopy.
K-190
improved prototype with 190 hp (140 kW) Lycoming engine, marketed as an open cockpit crop-duster, certified in April 1949
K-190A
open frame three-seat helicopter, powered by a 175 hp (130 kW) Lycoming O-435-C engine. Type certified on April 15, 1949.
K-190B
four-seat version.
K-225
improved model, powered by a 225 hp (168 kW) Lycoming O-435-A2 engine, certified on September 16, 1949.
K-5
designation for K-225 with Boeing T50-BO-2 model 502 engine.
YH-22
United States Air Force designation for one K-225 bought for evaluation.

== Specifications (K-225) ==
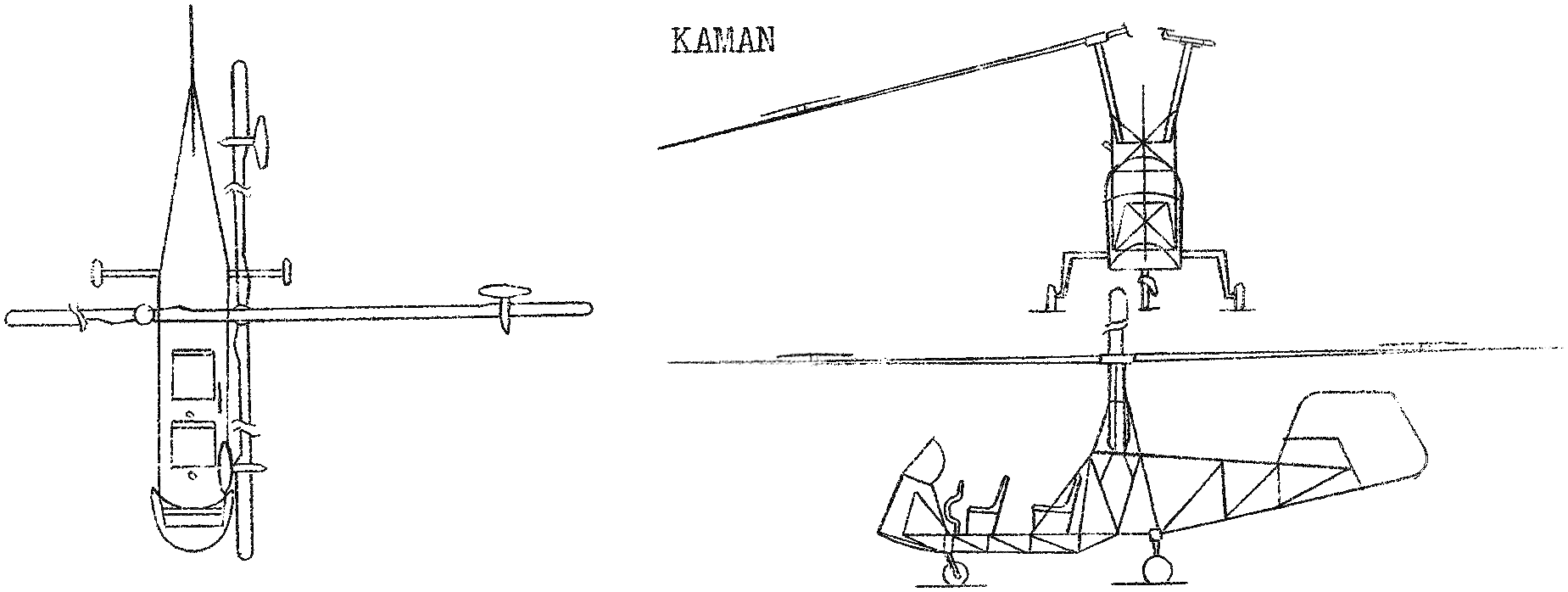
3-view line drawing of the Kaman K-225

Data from

General characteristics

- Crew: two
- Length: 22 ft 5 in (6.83 m)
- Height: 11 ft 0 in (3.35 m)
- Empty weight: 1,799 lb (816 kg)
- Gross weight: 2,703 lb (1,226 kg)
- Powerplant: 1 × Lycoming O-435-2 6-cyl. air-cooled horizontally opposed piston engine, 225 hp (168 kW)
- Main rotor diameter: 2 × 38 ft 0 in (11.58 m)

Performance

- Maximum speed: 73 mph (117 km/h, 63 kn)

== See also ==
Related development

- Kaman HH-43 Huskie

Aircraft of comparable role, configuration, and era

- Flettner Fl 282
