= Kaman K-1125 =

Prototype American civil transport helicopter

K-1125
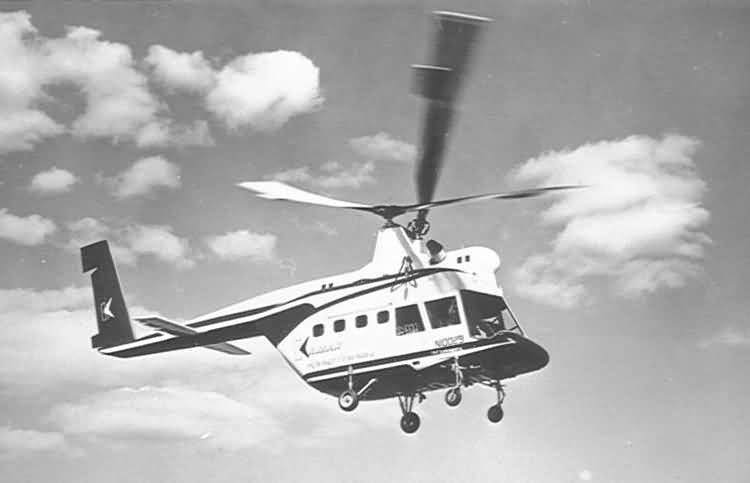

General information
- Type: Civil transport helicopter
- National origin: United States
- Manufacturer: Kaman Aircraft
- Number built: 1

History
- First flight: 1962

The Kaman K-1125 was a prototype American 12-passenger civil transport helicopter developed by Kaman Aircraft.

== Development ==
In August 1962, Kaman Aircraft first flew a prototype civil transport helicopter. It used components of the earlier Kaman K-600 (H-43) with a new fuselage for 12 passengers. Instead of the twin booms of the earlier Huskie, it had a single boom and a ramp-equipped rear door. Sometimes called the Huskie III, the helicopter was powered by two Boeing YT60 turboshafts which were later replaced with two Pratt & Whitney PT6B-11 engines.

The company tried to interest the United States Air Force in the type and it was evaluated for two years, but with no interest in the type, only the prototype was built.

== Specifications ==
Data from

General characteristics

- Crew: 2
- Capacity: 6 to 12 passengers
- Empty weight: 5,203 lb (2,360 kg)
- Max takeoff weight: 10,439 lb (4,735 kg)
- Powerplant: 2 × Pratt & Whitney PT6B-11 Turboshaft, 771 hp (575 kW) each

Performance

- Maximum speed: 138 mph (222 km/h, 120 kn)
- Cruise speed: 121 mph (195 km/h, 105 kn)
- Range: 390 mi (630 km, 340 nmi)

== See also ==
Related lists

- List of rotorcraft
