= Boeing T60 =

Class of aircraft engine

T60 / Model 520
- Type: Turboshaft / Turboprop
- National origin: United States
- Manufacturer: Boeing
- Developed from: Boeing T50 / Model 502

The Boeing T60 (company designation Model 520) was a family of small turboshaft/turboprop engines produced by Boeing, based on Boeing's earlier Model 500 gas generator and Model 502 (T50) turboshaft engines.

== Variants ==
YT60-BO-2A
Military turboshaft version for testing.
520-2
(YT60-BO-2A) Free power turbine turboshaft rated at 475 hp (354.21 kW)
520-4
Turboprop rated at 475 hp (354.21 kW)
520-6
Direct drive turboshaft rated at 550 hp (410.13 kW) military power
520-8
Turboprop rated at 550 hp (410.13 kW)

== Specifications (520-6) ==
Data from Jane's All the World's Aircraft 1962–63

==== General characteristics ====
- Type: Turboshaft
- Length: 54.1 in (1,374 mm)
- Diameter: 25.14 in (639 mm) maximum height
- Dry weight: 250 lb (113 kg)

==== Components ====
- Compressor: Single-stage centrifugal flow
- Combustors: 2 reverse flow can combustors
- Turbine: 1x radial gas generator power turbine stage
- Fuel type: Aviation kerosene
- Oil system: pressure spray/splash, oil specification: MIL-L-7808

==== Performance ====
- Maximum power output: 550 hp (410.13 kW) military rating at 6,000 output shaft rpm
- Overall pressure ratio: 6:1
- Air mass flow: 5.5 lb/s (2 kg/s)
- Turbine inlet temperature: Jet pipe Temperature: 1,025 °F (552 °C)
- Specific fuel consumption: 0.67 lb/(hp h) (0.41 kg/(kW h))
- Power-to-weight ratio: 2.2 hp/lb (3.616 kW/kg)

== See also ==
Related development

- Boeing T50

Related lists

- List of aircraft engines
