= Breaker (hydraulic) =

Subclass of tool

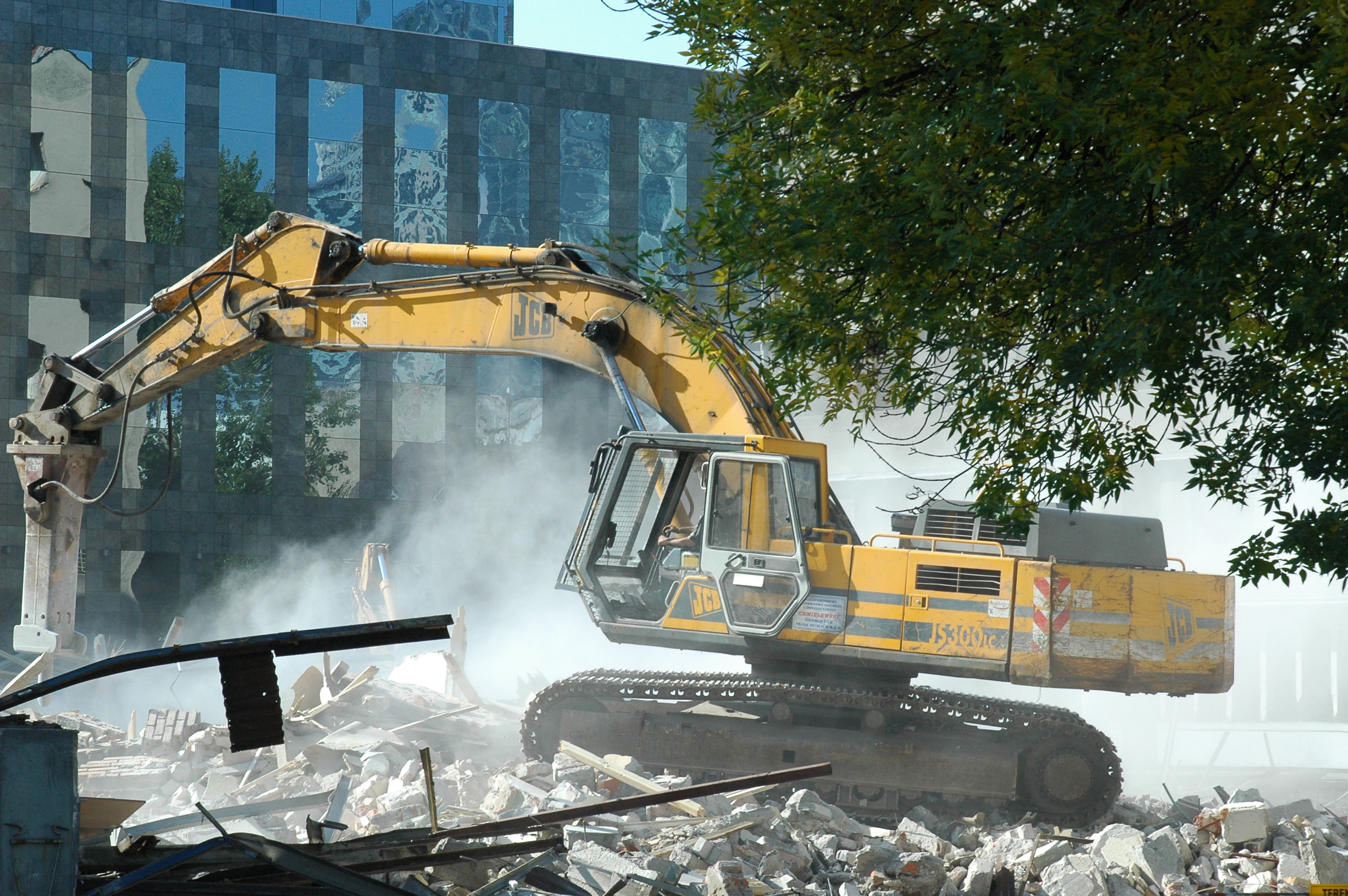
A breaker is mounted on the excavator on the left side

Hydraulic breaker attachment on a skid-steer loader

A breaker is a powerful percussion hammer fitted to an excavator for demolishing hard (rock or concrete) structures. It is powered by an auxiliary hydraulic system from the excavator, which is fitted with a foot-operated valve for this purpose. Additionally, demolition crews employ the hoe ram for jobs too large for jackhammering or areas where blasting is not possible due to safety or environmental issues.

Breakers are often referred to as "hammers", "peckers", "hoe rams" or "hoe rammers". These terms are popular and commonly used amongst construction/demolition workers. The first hydraulic breaker, Hydraulikhammer HM 400, was invented in 1967 by German company Krupp in Essen (today Swedish company Epiroc).

== Specifications ==
Hydraulic Breaker Specifications for Various Excavator Sizes
Suitable Excavator (tonne)	Suitable Excavator (lbs)	Chisel Diameter (mm / inches)	Total Weight (kg)	Total Weight (lbs)	Overall Length (mm / inches)	Operating Pressure (kg/cm²)	Oil Flow (l/min)	Impact Rate (BPM)	Energy Class (ft lb)	Hose Diameter (inch)
0.8 - 2.0	1760 - 4400	40 / 1.75	115	253	983 / 38.55	90 - 120	15 - 25	800 - 1400	150	1/2
2.0 - 4.0	4400 - 8800	45 / 1.95	115	253	983 / 38.55	90 - 120	15 - 25	800 - 1400	650	1/2
2.0 - 4.0	4400 - 8800	53 / 2.08	180	396	1100 / 43.14	90 - 120	15 - 25	700 - 1200	650	1/2
4.0 - 7.0	8800 - 15400	75 / 2.95	421	926	1700 / 66.92	110 - 160	30 - 45	500 - 800	1000	1/2
7.0 - 11.0	15400 - 24200	85 / 3.34	577	1269	1920 / 75.59	120 - 170	45 - 85	400 - 700	1500	1/2
11.0 - 18.0	24200 - 39600	100 / 3.93	973	2140	2260 / 88.97	150 - 170	80 - 120	400 - 700	4000	3/4
19.0 - 28.0	41800 - 61600	140 / 5.50	1989	4375	2810 / 110.62	160 - 180	130 - 170	400 - 600	6000	1
28.0 - 40.0	61600 - 88000	155 / 6.10	2950	6490	3152 / 123.61	160 - 180	170 - 220	250 - 400	8000	1
40.0 - 55.0	88000 - 121000	175 / 6.88	4210	9262	3400 / 133.85	160 - 180	210 - 290	200 - 350	10000	1.25

== See also ==
- Excavator
- Particulates

== Bibliography ==
- Association of Equipment Manufacturers (2010). Carrier Mounted Hydraulic Breaker: Safety Manual for Operating and Maintenance Personnel.
