= Ovation Breadwinner =

Solid-body electric guitar made by Ovation

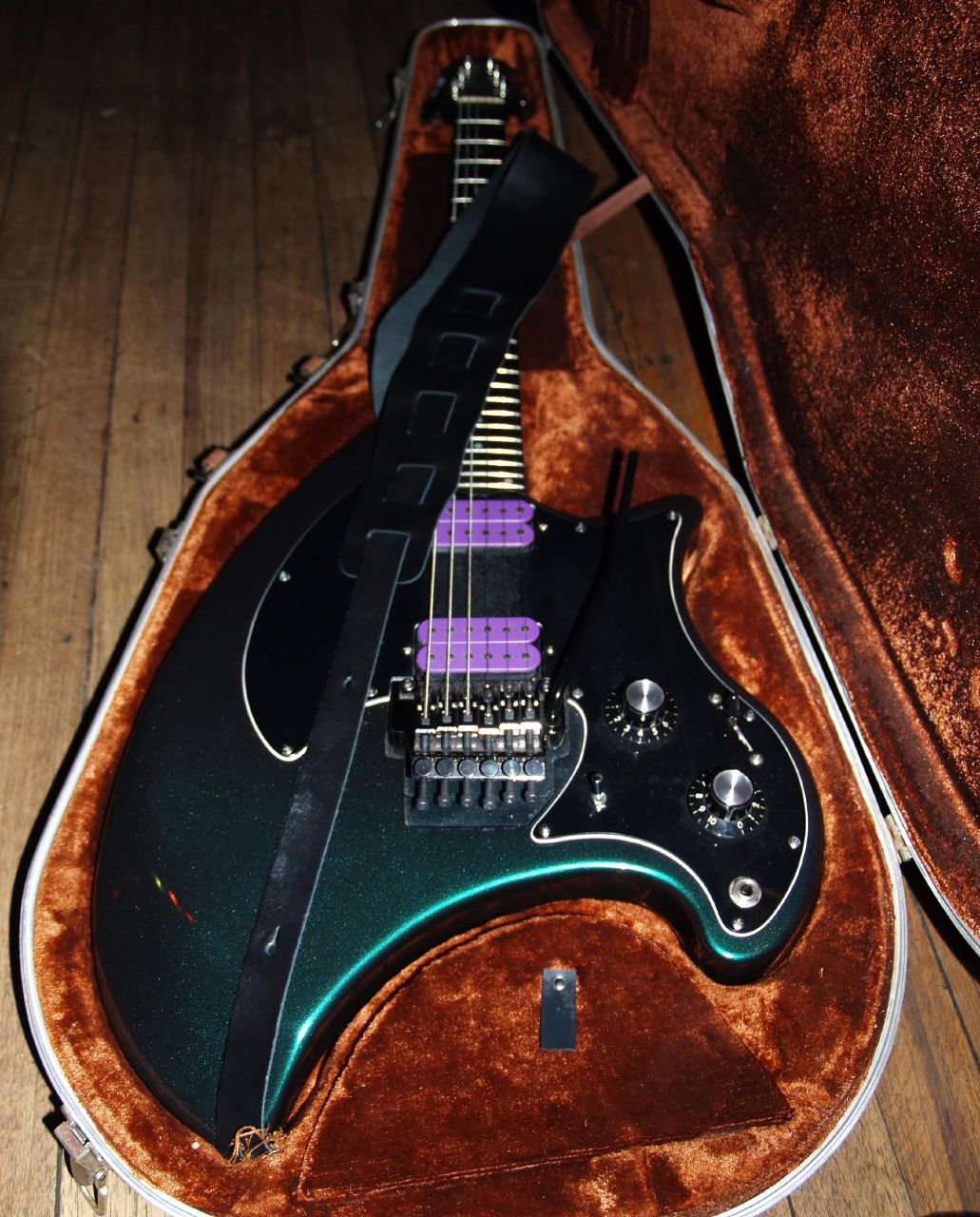
- The Ovation Breadwinner (Solid body electric guitar, mahogany)
- Manufacturer: Ovation Guitar Company

Construction
- Body type: Solid

Woods
- Body: Mahogany

Hardware
- Pickup: S-S or H-H

The Breadwinner was a solid body electric guitar made by the Ovation Guitar Company between 1971 and 1979. Ovation's first solid body electric guitar, it is one of the few solid body electrics the company ever made, and it was the first mass-produced American guitar to have active electronics. It has an unusual ergonomic body made of mahogany and shaped something like an axe guitar. Although that is not the only reason for the body shape, the designer also considered balance and ergonomics. The guitar has either two toroidal single-pole pickups (early models) or two mini-humbucker pickups, a master volume and tone control (which boosts or cuts treble, and is "normal" in the centre position), a three way pickup selector (configured as Neck, Bridge, Neck + Bridge Out of Phase) and a notch filter switch for filtering out Mid Frequencies.

There were three distinct models based upon the Breadwinner's exotic shape - the Breadwinner, the Deacon, and the Breadwinner Limited. The main difference between the Breadwinner and the Breadwinner Limited was an odd additional cutaway in the upper body and a "Tuxedo" gray to black finish. The difference between the Breadwinner and the Deacon was in the finish and hardware used. The Breadwinners were coated in Kaman Industries' "LyraChord" material and were available in a number of colors including Blue, White, Black, Tan, Gray, and Red while the Deacon was available in either Natural Sunburst, Clear Mahogany, or a clear Red finish - all three were glossy. The Deacon also had Mother of Pearl diamond-shaped inlays and an ivory binding around the fretboard.

Early models were equipped with Ovation's toroidal single pole pickups while later models were equipped with humbuckers. Most collectors and players prefer the sound of the original toroidal pickups.

Regardless of the model, the guitar was one of the first to come equipped with an active FET preamp on board. The active electronics allowed guitarists to get a very wide range of sounds out of the guitar. In fact, Ovation published a guide to sounds where it listed various sounds related to bands and the settings to use to achieve those sounds with the guitar's electronics.

David Cassidy played an Ovation Breadwinner on The Partridge Family TV show in the early 70’s. Peter Tosh of The Wailers used a Breadwinner during the band's 1973 "Burnin'" Tour, and can be seen/heard with it in the 1973 "Capitol Sessions" video, as well as on the album "Talkin Blues". Björn Ulvaeus of ABBA used a white version of the Breadwinner on their 1977 tour through Europe and Australia. Colin Newman of the band Wire also uses a white Breadwinner, particularly in the early days of Wire. Marc Bolan of glam rock group T.Rex can be seen playing a tuxedo black Breadwinner on the group's appearance on Top Of The Pops for their "The Groover" single in 1973. On the original back cover of the 1980 album Panorama by The Cars, keyboardist Greg Hawkes can be seen holding a black version of the Breadwinner. In the early 80's, Robert Smith of The Cure used a black version whilst filling in as guitarist for Siouxsie and the Banshees, he can be seen playing it in the Nocturne live footage. Tom Morello of Rage Against the Machine uses a Breadwinner in the song "Ashes in the Fall". Dave Gregory of XTC also occasionally played a Breadwinner.The late guitar hero Ace Frehley also played a Breadwinner in the early days of Kiss.
