= KMCMusicorp =

Musical instrument company

KMC Music
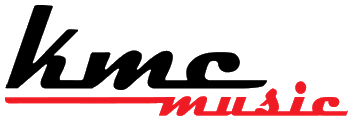
- Company type: Division
- Industry: Musical instruments
- Predecessor: Kaman Music Corporation
- Founded: 1966; 60 years ago
- Headquarters: Bloomfield, Connecticut, United States
- Key people: Charles Kaman
- Products: String instruments Brass instruments Percussion instruments Amplifiers
- Brands: Ampeg; Daisy Rock Girl; Hamer; Remo; Randall; Washburn
- Parent: Exertis JAM
- Website: kmcmusic.com

KMC Music is an owner and distributor of several brands of musical instruments. The company is currently a subsidiary of Canadian corporate group Exertis | JAM.

== History ==
The company began as Kaman Music Corporation /kəˈmɑːn/, a part of the Kaman Corporation founded by Charles Kaman. In addition to his business interests in aviation, Kaman was a guitarist who came to explore the use of composite materials technologies in guitar building. He and his engineers created the round-backed, composite-body Ovation guitar in 1966.

In January 2008, Kaman Corporation sold Kaman Music Corporation to Fender Musical Instruments Corporation (FMIC) for $117 million.

In 2011, Kaman Music Corporation and Musicorp, sister companies under the FMIC umbrella, united their sales and catalog divisions as KMC Musicorp.

As of 2018, Hamer has moved its facilities to China.

In 2014, FMIC sold KMC's Gretsch Drums, Toca Percussion, Latin Percussion, KAT Percussion, Ovation Guitars, and Gibraltar Hardware brands to Drum Workshop.

In February 2015, Fender Musical Instruments Corporation sold KMC to JAM Industries, which rebranded as Exertis | JAM in 2021.

== Brands ==
Some of the companies that are currently subsidiaries of KMC are:

Brand	Products
Daisy Rock Girl	Electric guitars, basses, ukuleles
Randall	Guitar amplifiers
Remo	Drum kits and heads

== See also ==
- Ashly Audio (also a subsidiary of Jam Industries)
- U.S. Music Corporation (also a subsidiary of Jam Industries)
- Ventura (Japanese guitars)
