= Ovation Guitar Company =

American guitar manufacturer

The Ovation Guitar Company, a holding of Kaman Music Corporation, is a guitar manufacturing company based in New Hartford, Connecticut, United States. Ovation primarily manufactures acoustic guitars.

Ovation guitars are differentiated by their composite synthetic bowl, rather than the traditional wooden back and sides of the modern acoustic guitar as produced by luthiers starting in the late 18th century. Ovation has also produced solid body electric guitars and active basses.

Developed starting in 1966 and introduced as the 'Balladeer' in February, 1967, Ovations reached the height of their popularity in the 1980s, where they were more often than not seen during live performances by touring artists if acoustic guitars were being played. Ovation guitars' synthetic bowl and early use (1971) of preamps, onboard equalization and piezo pickups were particularly attractive to live acoustic musicians who constantly battled feedback problems from the high volumes needed in live venues.

Since the 1980s they have remained popular with studio musicians, but are less frequently seen on stage.

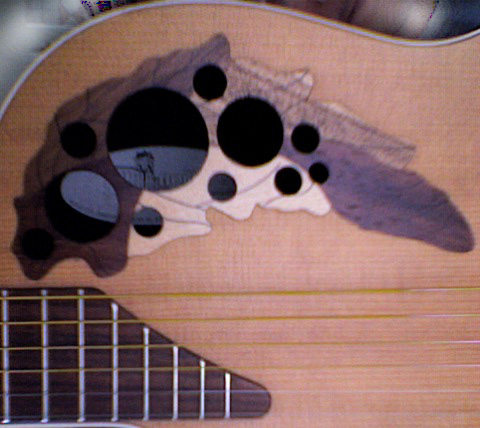
Leaf sound hole in an Ovation model

The first Ovation guitar was developed in 1966 by Charles Kaman (born 1919). Kaman, an amateur guitarist from an early age, received his bachelors degree in aeronautical engineering from the Catholic University of America in Washington, and then worked on helicopter design as an aerodynamicist at United. Eventually he founded his own helicopter design company, Kaman Aircraft, in 1945.

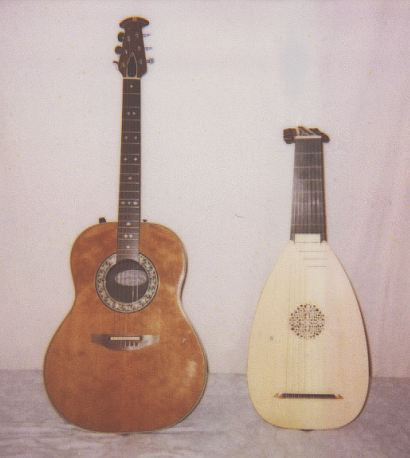
A mid-1970s Kaman Ovation 1612-4 Acoustic Electric Guitar, next to a lute.

The Kaman Corporation soon diversified, branching off into nuclear weapons testing, commercial helicopter flight, the development and testing of chemicals, and helicopter bearings production. But in the early 1960s, financial problems due to the failure of their commercial flight division forced them to consider expanding into new markets, such as entertainment and leisure. Coincidentally, Charles Kaman, still an avid guitar player, became interested in the making of guitars.

Using his background in aviation engineering, Kaman designed a rounded-bowl back, intended to improve the flow of sound through the guitar, and developed a new top bracing system. Finally, although he kept the idea of using a wood soundboard, the body and sides of the guitar were manufactured of composite. This configuration has characterized nearly all Ovation acoustic and acoustic-electric guitars down to the present day.

In 1972, Ovation introduced one of the first production solid body electric guitars with active electronics, the Ovation Breadwinner. The model failed to gain widespread popularity, however, and production of the Breadwinner and the Ovation Deacon ceased in 1980. Ovation made several other solid body models up until the mid 80s. Many of these guitars have become collector's items since only a few thousand were made of each model. Since that time the company's main focus has been acoustic and acoustic-electric guitars.

Other Ovation innovations include composite tops and multiple offset sound holes on guitar tops, pioneered in the Adamas model in 1977. Kaman Music has also sold budget guitars—and even mandolins and ukuleles—based on similar design principles to the Ovation such as the Korean-built Celebrity series and the Korean or Chinese-built Applause brand.

Notable Ovation guitar players include Cat Stevens, John Lennon, Jimmy Page, Shania Twain, Richard Daniel Roman, Jim Croce, Maury Muehleisen, Joan Armatrading, Glen Campbell, Al Di Meola, Melissa Etheridge, Richie Sambora, Kaki King, Cyndi Lauper, Adrian Legg, Steve Lukather, Adonis Mitzelos, Yngwie Malmsteen, Ziggy Marley, Stephen Marley, Dave Mustaine, Vince Neil, Nikki Sixx, Mick Thomson, Aaron Tippin, Paul Wong, Bob Marley, Robert Fripp, Brian May, Freddie Mercury, Roger Waters, David Gilmour, Luis Alberto Spinetta, Kevin Cronin, David Lebón, Country Joe McDonald, Victor Heredia, Nancy Wilson, and many others. Besides, Ovation is the recommended guitar in Robert Fripp's Guitar Craft.

== Sources and external links ==
- Ovation Guitars
- Ovation Makeover - A guitarist fixes up his ovation.
- Ovation Fan Club
- Charles Kaman at Invent Now
- Ovation Guitars Resources
- OvationUK
- The Ultimate Guitar Book by Tony Bacon
