= The Bread Winner =

1990 children's novel by Arvella Whitmore

- Author: Arvella Whitmore
- Genre: Children's literature
- Publisher: HMH Books for Young Readers; Reprint edition (August 30, 2004)
- Publication date: October 1990
- Pages: 144 pp.
- ISBN: 0618494790

The Bread Winner is a 1990 novel by Arvella Whitmore.

== Plot ==
The story takes place in 1932 depression era United States. Protagonist Sarah Ann Puckett moves with her family to a small town after selling the failed family farm. Her parents quickly become despondent as money begins to run short, but Sarah resourcefully begins selling her award-winning bread to neighbors and eventually acquires a store front, all the while dealing with bullies and hobos as well as other setbacks such as a tornado.

== Reception ==
The Bread Winner was selected as a "Notable 1990 Children's Trade Book in the Field of Social Studies" by the National Council for the Social Studies and Children's Book Council.

Critical reception for the book was mostly positive. Zena Sutherland from The Bulletin of the Center for Children's Books felt that the novel "gives a convincing picture of the way residents of a small town help each other." She added that the "characterization is sturdy, the structure modest but satisfying, and the writing has a smooth narrative flow." Susan F. Marcus, writing for the School Library Journal, thought that the "Depression and its people come alive in this touching and well-crafted novel." Publishers Weekly stated that the protagonist is "a little too good to be true" and the "setbacks Whitmore throws in are almost formulaic". However, they thought that her "reactions to her parents' despair are both convincing and moving, and it's impossible not to admire her never-say-die attitude." Kirkus Reviews felt that the novel was oversimplified, contained stilted dialogue, lack of development and unlikely events. They said that despite this, "Sarah is a strong female protagonist and the well-structured story fast paced, while Whitmore's evocation of the period allows readers to share the desperation of hard-working, decent people."
