= Boeing T50 =

American turboshaft engine

T50
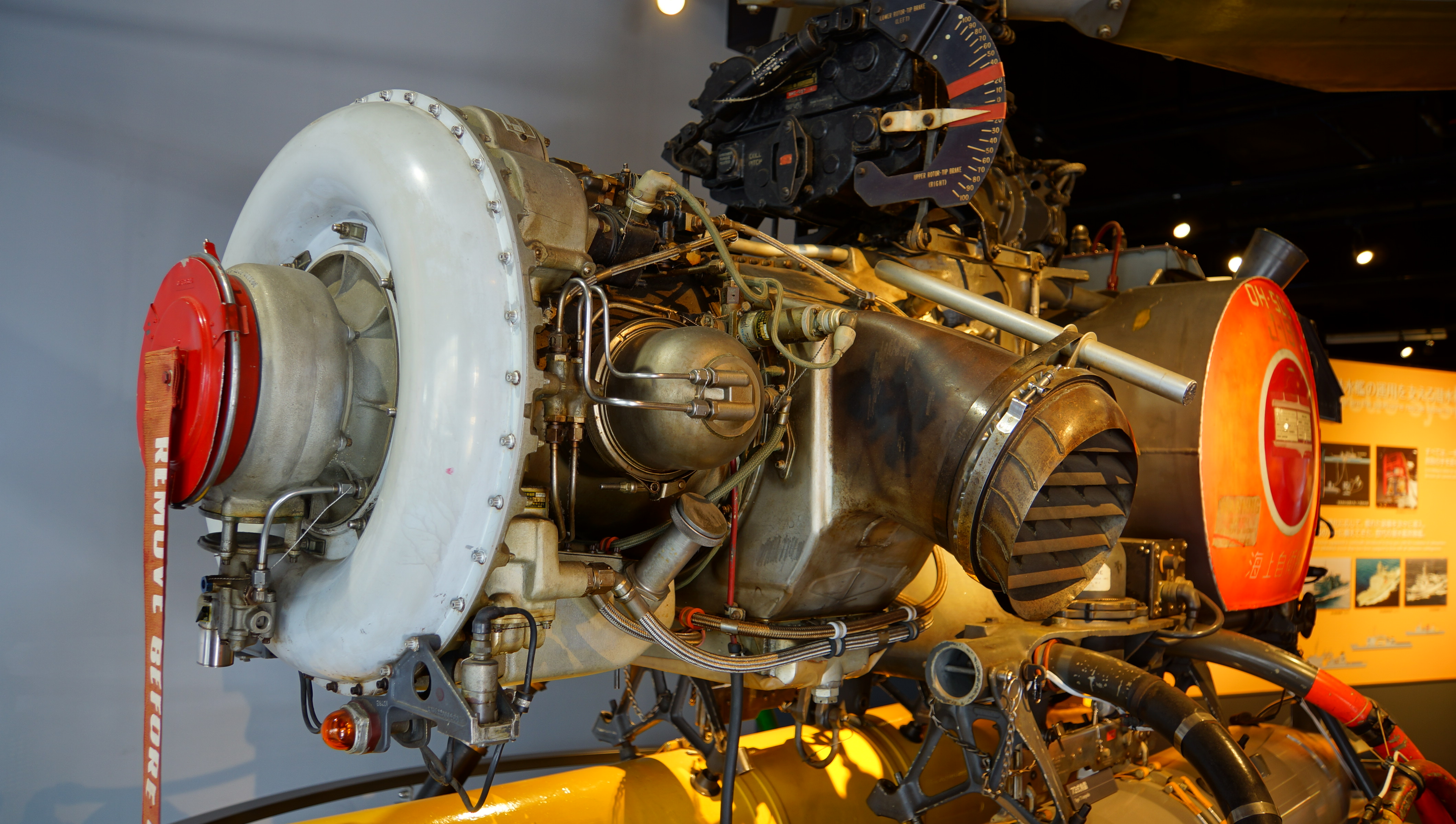
- Type: Turboshaft
- National origin: United States
- Manufacturer: Boeing
- Major applications: QH-50 DASH
- Developed into: Boeing T60

The Boeing T50 (company designation Model 502) was a small turboshaft engine produced by Boeing. It was the first turboshaft engine to ever power a helicopter: a modified Kaman K-225 in 1951. Based on Boeing's earlier Model 500 gas generator, the T50's main application was in the QH-50 DASH helicopter drone of the 1950s. An up-rated version designated Model 550 was developed to power the QH-50D and was given the military designation T50-BO-12.

Two T50 were tested on a HTK-1 (Kaman HH-43 Huskie) in the 1950s, which was the first test of twin turbine engine on a helicopter.

== Variants ==
T50-BO-1
T50-BO-2
T50-BO-4
270 hp (201.34 kW) at 6,000 output rpm, military rating turboprop.
T50-BO-6
T50-BO-8
300 hp (223.71 kW) at 5,950 output rpm, revised reduction gear ratio, fuelsystem and other changes.
T50-BO-8A
T50-BO-10
330 hp (246.08 kW) at 6,000 output rpm
T50-BO-12
502-1-1
Auxiliary power unit
502-2E
Turboprop, 175 hp (130.50 kW) at 2,900 output rpm max. continuous at sea level.
502-6
Engine for an engine-generator set used for magnetic minesweeping by the US Navy.
502-7B
Compressed air generator.
502-8A
Turboshaft.
502-8B
Turboprop, 210 hp (156.60 kW) at 37,500 compressor rpm for take-off.
502-10B
Turboprop, 270 hp (201.34 kW) at 37,500 compressor rpm for take-off.
502-10C
Turboshaft power unit / gas producer
502-10F
502-10V
(T50-BO-4)
502-10VB
325 hp (242.35 kW) at 3,000 output rpm, variant of -10V / T50-B0-4 with revised reduction gear ratio.
502-10VC
(T50-BO-8)
502-11
Compressed air generator.
502-11B
502-12B
502-W
502-14
(T50-BO-10)
550-1
(T50-BO-12)

== Applications ==
T50 (Model 502)

- Gyrodyne QH-50 DASH
- Kaman K-225
- Kaman HTK-1
- Kaman K-1125
- XL-19B Bird Dog
- Radioplane RP-77D

GT502

- Stridsvagn 103

== Specifications (T50-BO-10 / 502-14) ==
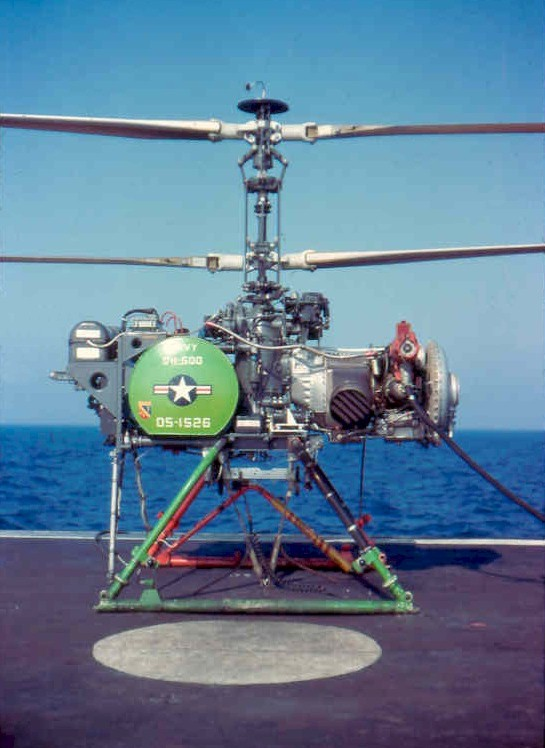
A QH-50D anti-submarine drone aboard the USS Allen M. Sumner (DD-692) in the late 1960s, with the T50 engine visible on the right

Data from Jane's All the World's Aircraft 1962-63.

==== General characteristics ====
- Type: Turboshaft
- Length: 37.2 in (945 mm)
- Diameter: 22.5 in (572 mm)
- Dry weight: 215 lb (98 kg)

==== Components ====
- Compressor: Single-stage centrifugal flow
- Combustors: 2 can combustors
- Turbine: 1 axial gas generator power turbine stage and 1 axial free-power turbine stage
- Fuel type: Aviation kerosene
- Oil system: pressure spray/splash, oil specification: MIL-L-7808

==== Performance ====
- Maximum power output: 330 hp (246.08 kW) military rating at 6,000 output shaft rpm
- Overall pressure ratio: 4.35:1
- Air mass flow: (4.1 lb (2 kg))/s
- Turbine inlet temperature: Jet pipe Temperature: 1,140 °F (616 °C)
- Specific fuel consumption: 0.87 lb/(hp h) (0.532 kg/(kW h))
- Power-to-weight ratio: 1.535 hp/lb (2.523 kW/kg)

== See also ==
- Rover 1S60

Related development

- Boeing T60

Related lists

- List of aircraft engines
