= Kellett =

Kellett may refer to:

- Kellett Land, the classical name of Wrangel Island
- Kellett (surname)
- Kellett Island, a former island in Hong Kong.
- Kellett Autogiro Corporation, a former American aircraft manufacturer
- Kellett KD-1 (a.k.a. Kellett R-2), a 1930s American autogyro
- Kellett XR-10, a military transport helicopter
- Kellett Baronets, a title in the Baronetage of the United Kingdom
- Kellett Bay, a bay in Hong Kong
- Kellett Fellowship, a prize awarded at Columbia College
- Kellett railway station, in Kellett, Manitoba, Canada
