= List of aircraft at the National Museum of the United States Air Force =

The National Museum of the United States Air Force has one of the world's largest collections with more than 360 aircraft and missiles on display.

== List of aircraft ==
=== Early Years Gallery ===
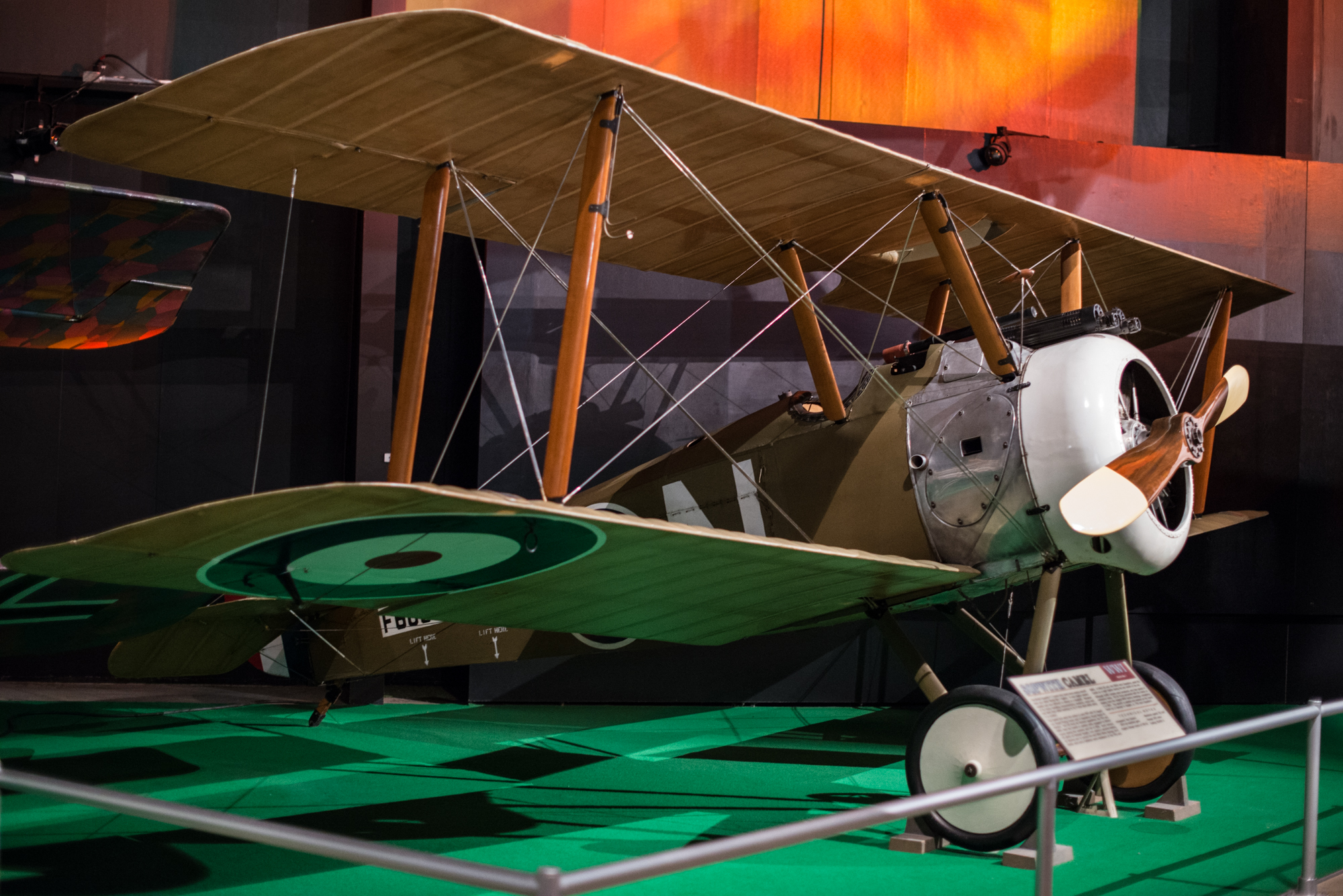
Sopwith Camel

- Avro 504K – reproduction
- Blériot XI monoplane
- Boeing P-12E 31-559
- Boeing P-26A Peashooter – reproduction
- Caproni Ca.36
- Consolidated PT-1 Trusty 26-233
- Curtiss 1911 Model D – reproduction
- Curtiss JN-4D "Jenny"
- Curtiss O-52 Owl 40-2763
- Curtiss P-6E Hawk 32-261 – painted as 32-240
- De Havilland DH-4 – reproduction
- Douglas O-38F 33‐324
- Eberhart S.E.5E
- Fairchild PT-19 42-34023
- Fokker Dr.I – reproduction
- Fokker D.VII – reproduction
- G-3 Target Glider
- Halberstadt CL.IV
- Hawker Hurricane Mk.IIa 5390
- Kellett K-2
- Kettering Bug (Aerial Torpedo)
- Martin MB-2 – reproduction
- Martin Model 139WAA – export version of B-10 bomber, painted in Air Corps livery
- Nieuport 28 C.1
- North American NA-64 – painted as a North American BT-9 or BT-14
- North American O-47B 39-112
- Northrop A-17 36-207
- Packard-Le Pere LUSAC-11
- Ryan YPT-16
- Schneider SG 38 Schulgleiter
- Sopwith Camel – reproduction
- SPAD VII 94099
- SPAD XIII 16594
- Standard J-1
- Standard J-1 – displayed without fabric skin
- Thomas-Morse S-4C Scout
- Wright Military Flyer (1909) – reproduction

=== World War II Gallery ===
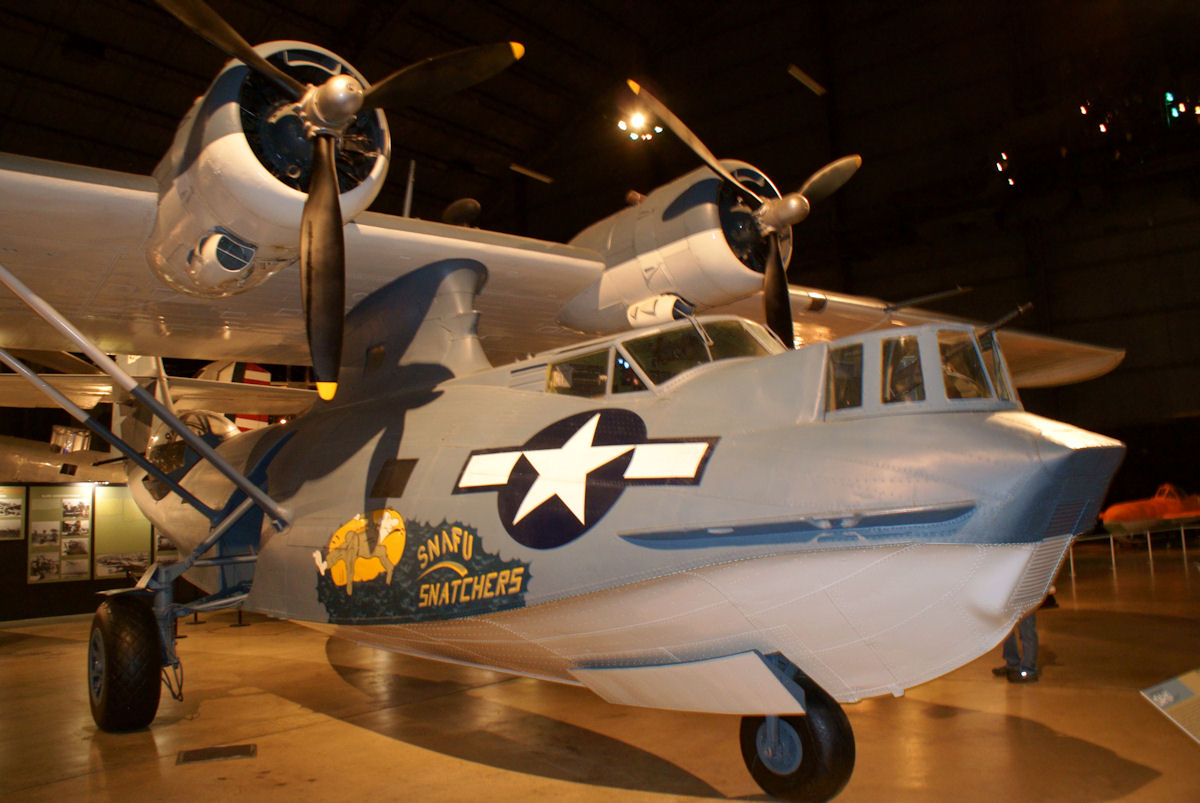
Consolidated OA-10 Catalina

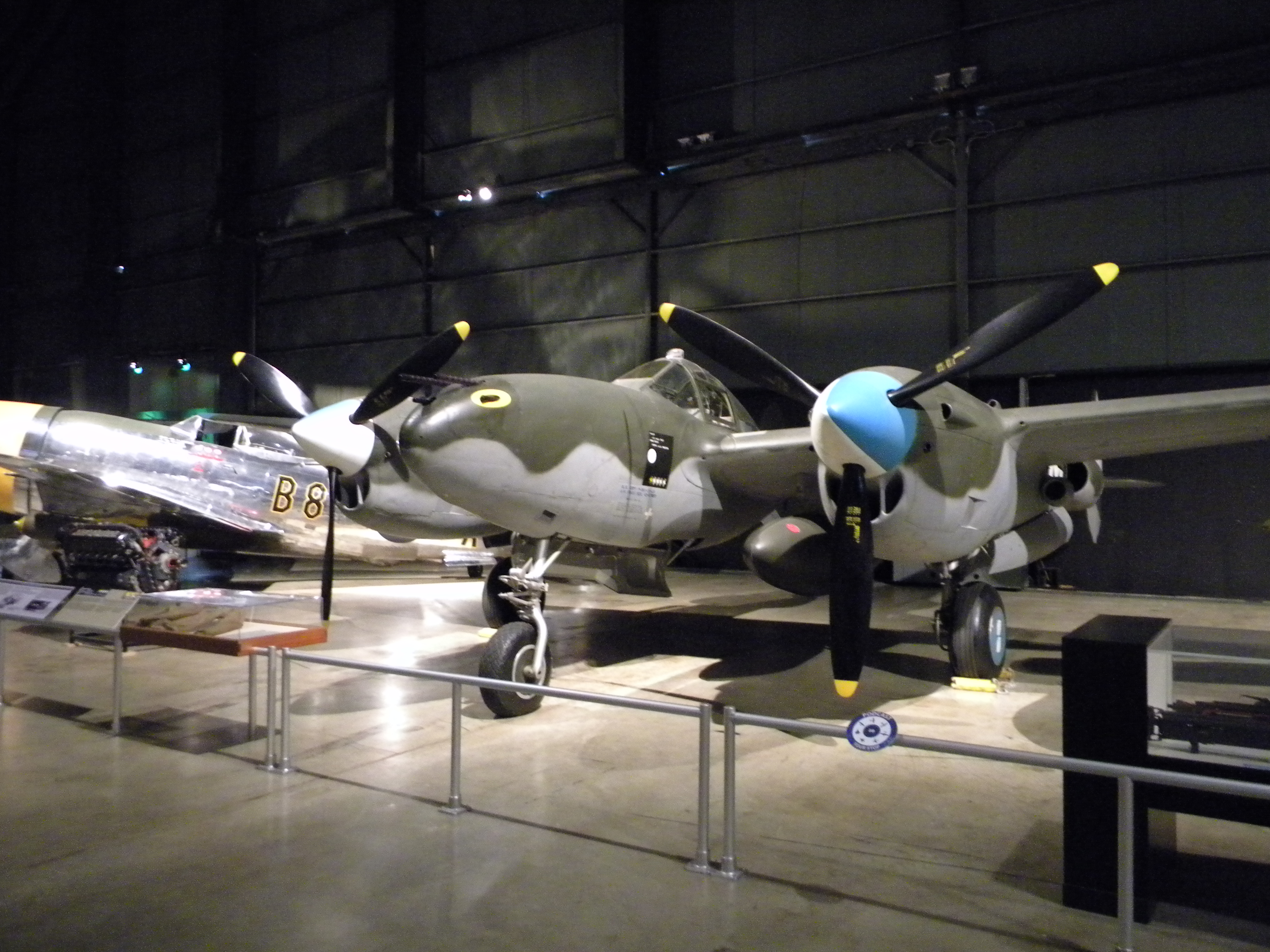
Lockheed P-38 Lightning

- Aeronca L-3B Grasshopper 42-36200
- Beechcraft AT-10 Wichita 42-35143
- Beech AT-11 Kansan 42-37493
- Beech GB-2 Traveler 23733 – painted as UC-43 39-139
- Bell P-39Q Airacobra 44-3887
- Boeing B-17F Flying Fortress 41-24485 "Memphis Belle"
- Boeing B-29 Superfortress 44-27297 "Bockscar" – weapon delivery aircraft used in atomic bombing on Nagasaki
- Bristol Beaufighter Mk Ic A19-43
- Cessna UC-78B Bobcat 42-71626
- Consolidated B-24D Liberator 42-72843 "Strawberry Bitch"
- Consolidated PBY-5A Catalina 46595 – painted as OA-10A 44-33879
- Culver PQ-14B
- Curtiss AT-9 Jeep 41-12150
- Curtiss C-46D Commando 44-78018
- Curtiss P-36A Hawk 38-001 – painted as 38-086
- Curtiss Hawk 87A-3 (P-40E) AK987 – painted in Flying Tigers markings
- De Havilland DH.82A Tiger Moth
- De Havilland DH.98 Mosquito Mk.35 RS709 - painted as NS519
- Douglas A-20G Havoc 43-22200
- Douglas A-24B Banshee 42-54582
- Douglas A-26B Invader
- Douglas B-18A Bolo 37-0469
- Douglas C-47D Skytrain 43-49507 – painted as 43-15213
- Fairchild Model 24-C8F (UC-61J)
- Focke-Achgelis Fa 330
- Focke-Wulf Fw 190 D-9 601088
- Interstate L-6 Grasshopper 43-2680
- Junkers Ju 88 D-1 430650 "Baksheesh"
- Kawanishi N1K2-Ja Shiden-Kai 5312
- Laister-Kauffmann TG-4A
- Lockheed P-38L Lightning 44-53232
- Macchi MC.200 Saetta MM8146
- Martin B-26G Marauder 43-34581
- Messerschmitt Bf 109G-10 610824
- Messerschmitt Me 163B Komet 191095
- Messerschmitt Me 262A Schwalbe 501232
- Mitsubishi A6M2 Zero 51553
- Noorduyn UC-64A Norseman 44-70296
- North American A-36A Apache 42-83665
- North American F-10D Mitchell 43-3374 – painted as B-25B, Doolittle Raider's diorama
- North American P-51D Mustang 44-74936
- Northrop P-61C Black Widow 43-8353
- Piper L-4A Grasshopper 42‐36790 – painted as 42-36389
- Radioplane OQ-2A
- Republic P-47D Thunderbolt 42-23278 "Fiery Ginger" – razorback
- Ryan PT-22 Recruit 41-15721
- Schweizer TG-3A 42-52988
- Seversky P-35 36-404
- Sikorsky R-4B Hoverfly 43-46506
- Sikorsky R-6A Hoverfly II 43-45379
- Stearman PT-13D Kaydet 42‐17800 – painted as N2S-5 60591
- Stinson L-5 Sentinel 42-98225 – painted as 42-98667
- Supermarine Spitfire Mk.Vc A58-246 – painted as MA863, traded by the Imperial War Museum Duxford for a B-24
- Supermarine Spitfire PR Mk.XI PA908 – painted as MB950
- Taylorcraft L-2M Grasshopper 43-26592 – painted as 43-26588
- Vultee BT-13 Valiant 42-90629
- Vultee L-1A Vigilant 41-19039
- Waco CG-4 45-27948
- Yokosuka MXY7 Ohka

=== Korean War Gallery ===
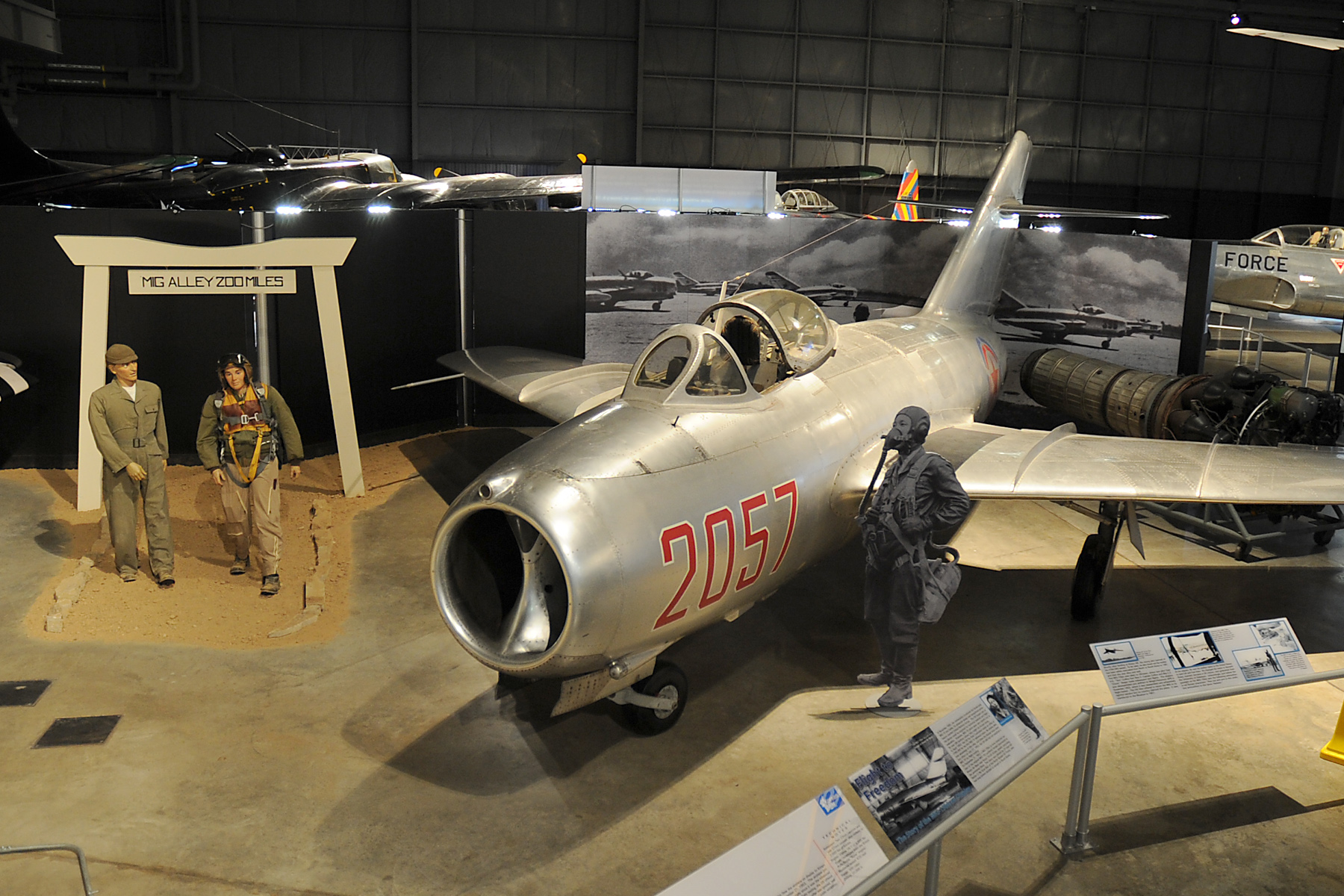
Mikoyan-Gurevich MiG-15bis

- Douglas A-26C Invader 44-35733
- Douglas C-124C Globemaster II 52-1066
- Lockheed F-80C Shooting Star 49-696
- Lockheed F-94A Starfire 49-2498
- Mikoyan-Gurevich MiG-15bis 2015357 – Soviet fighter of the Korean People's Air Force defected to Seoul, later flown by Chuck Yeager
- North American B-45C Tornado 48-0010
- North American F-82B Twin Mustang 44‐65162 – configured as an F-82G
- North American L-17A Navion 47‐1347
- North American F-86A Sabre 49-1067 – painted as 91236
- North American T-6D Mosquito 42-84216 – forward air control version of T-6 Texan trainer
- Republic F-84E Thunderjet 50-1143
- Sikorsky YH-5A 43-46620
- Sikorsky UH-19B Chickasaw 52-7587 "Hopalong"

=== Southeast Asia War Gallery ===
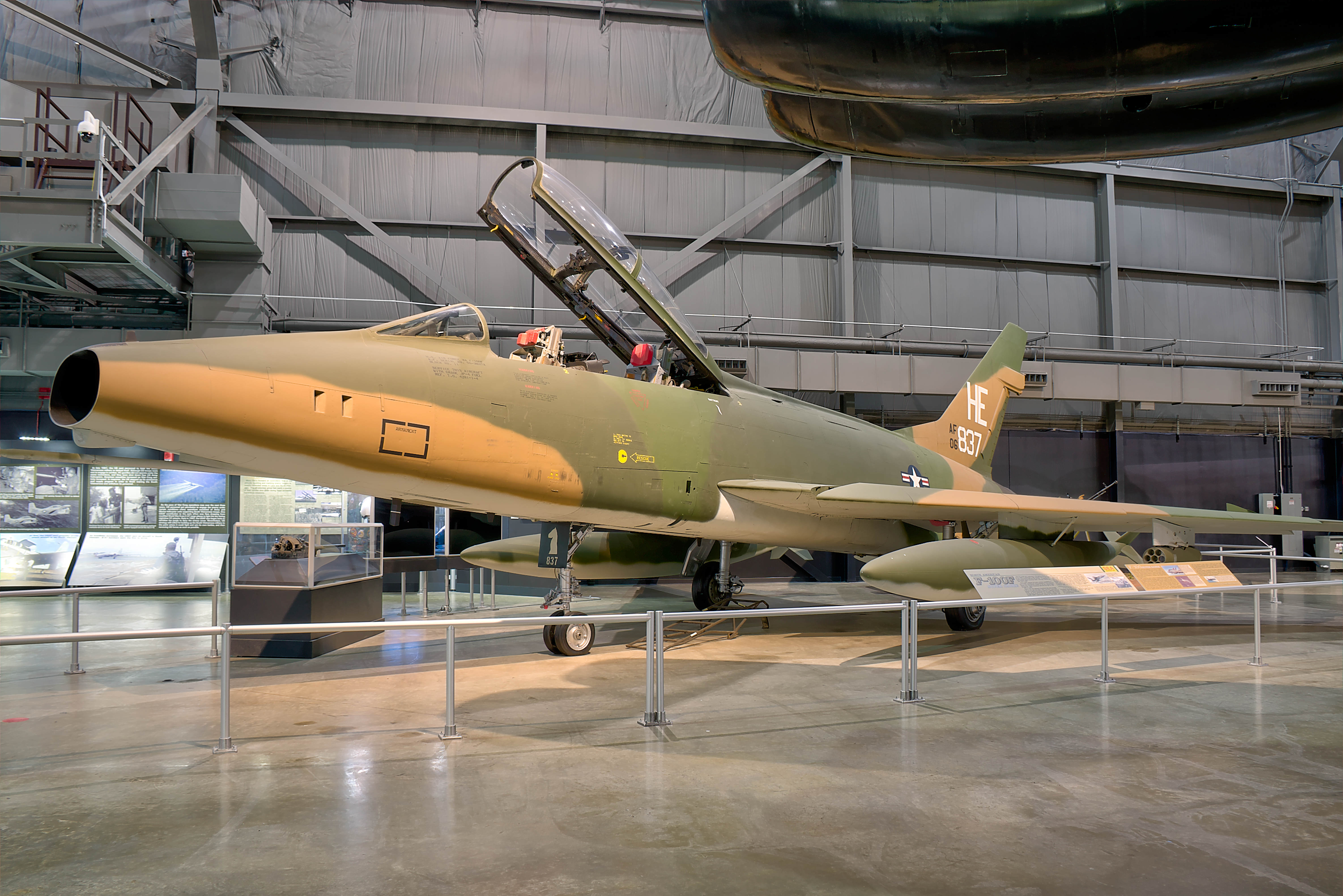
North American F-100F Super Sabre

- Beech QU-22B 69-7699
- Bell UH-1P Iroquois 64-15476
- Boeing B-52D Stratofortress 56-0665
- Cessna YA-37A Dragonfly 62-5951
- Cessna O-1G Bird Dog 51-11917
- Cessna O-2A Skymaster 67-21331
- De Havilland Canada C-7 Caribou 62-4193
- Douglas A-1E Skyraider 52-132649 – Medal of Honor aircraft
- Douglas A-1H Skyraider 134600 – painted as 52-139738
- Douglas B-26K (A-26) Counter Invader 64‐17676
- Douglas RB-66B Destroyer 53-0475
- Fairchild C-123K Provider 56-4362 "Patches"
- General Dynamics F-111A Aardvark 67-0067
- Helio U-10D Super Courier 66-14360
- Kaman HH-43B Huskie 60-0263
- Lockheed EC-121D Warning Star 53-555 "Triple Nickel"
- LTV A-7D Corsair II 70-0970
- Martin EB-57B Canberra 52-1499
- McDonnell RF-101 Voodoo 56-166
- McDonnell Douglas F-4C Phantom II 64-0829 "SCAT XXVII"
- Mikoyan-Gurevich MiG-17F
- Mikoyan-Gurevich MiG-21PF
- North American F-100F Super Sabre 56-3837
- North American OV-10A Bronco 68-03787
- North American T-28B Trojan 140048
- Northrop YF-5A Freedom Fighter 59-4989
- Republic F-105D Thunderchief 60-0504 "Memphis Belle II"
- Republic F-105G Thunderchief 63-8320
- Sikorsky CH-3E 63-9676
- Sikorsky HH-3E 67-14709

==== Other aircraft ====
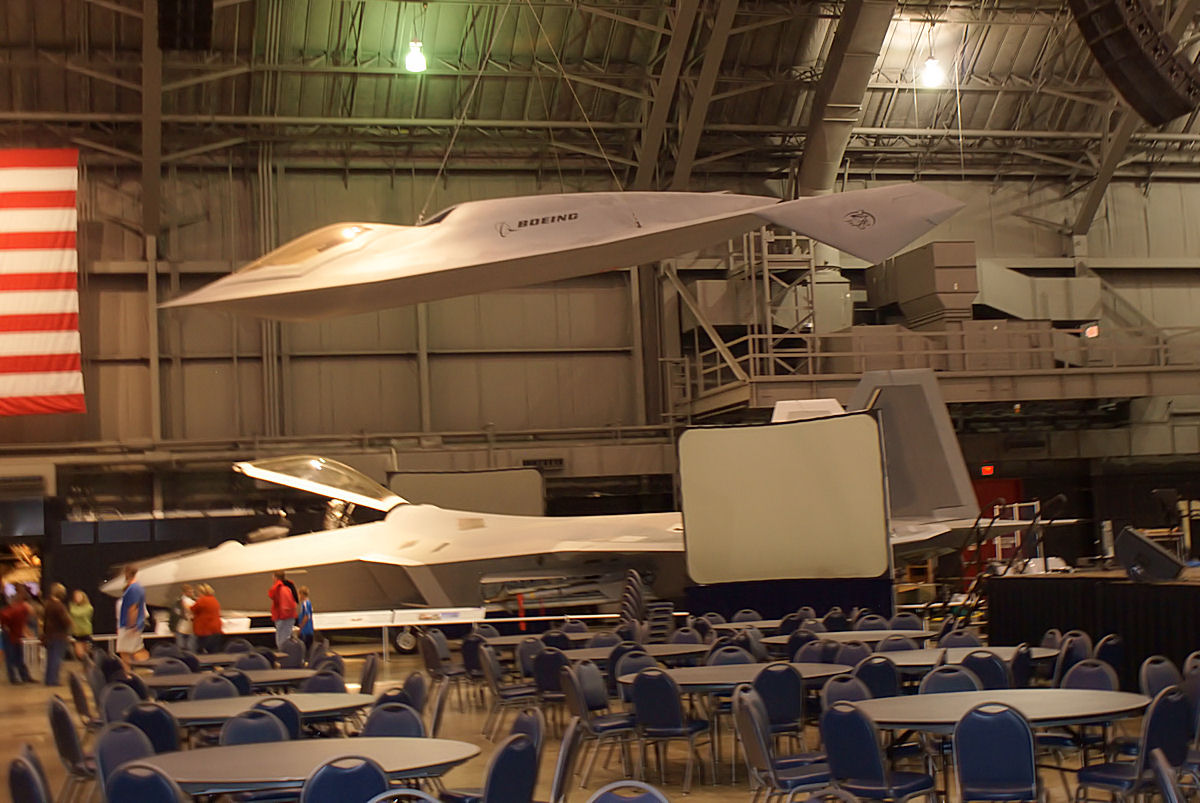
Lockheed Martin F-22A Raptor and Boeing Bird of Prey

- Boeing Bird of Prey
- General Atomics YMQ-9 Reaper 02‐4002
- Lockheed Martin F-22A Raptor 91‐4003
- Northrop Grumman YRQ-4A Global Hawk 98‐2003
- Wright Modified “B” Flyer

=== Cold War Gallery ===
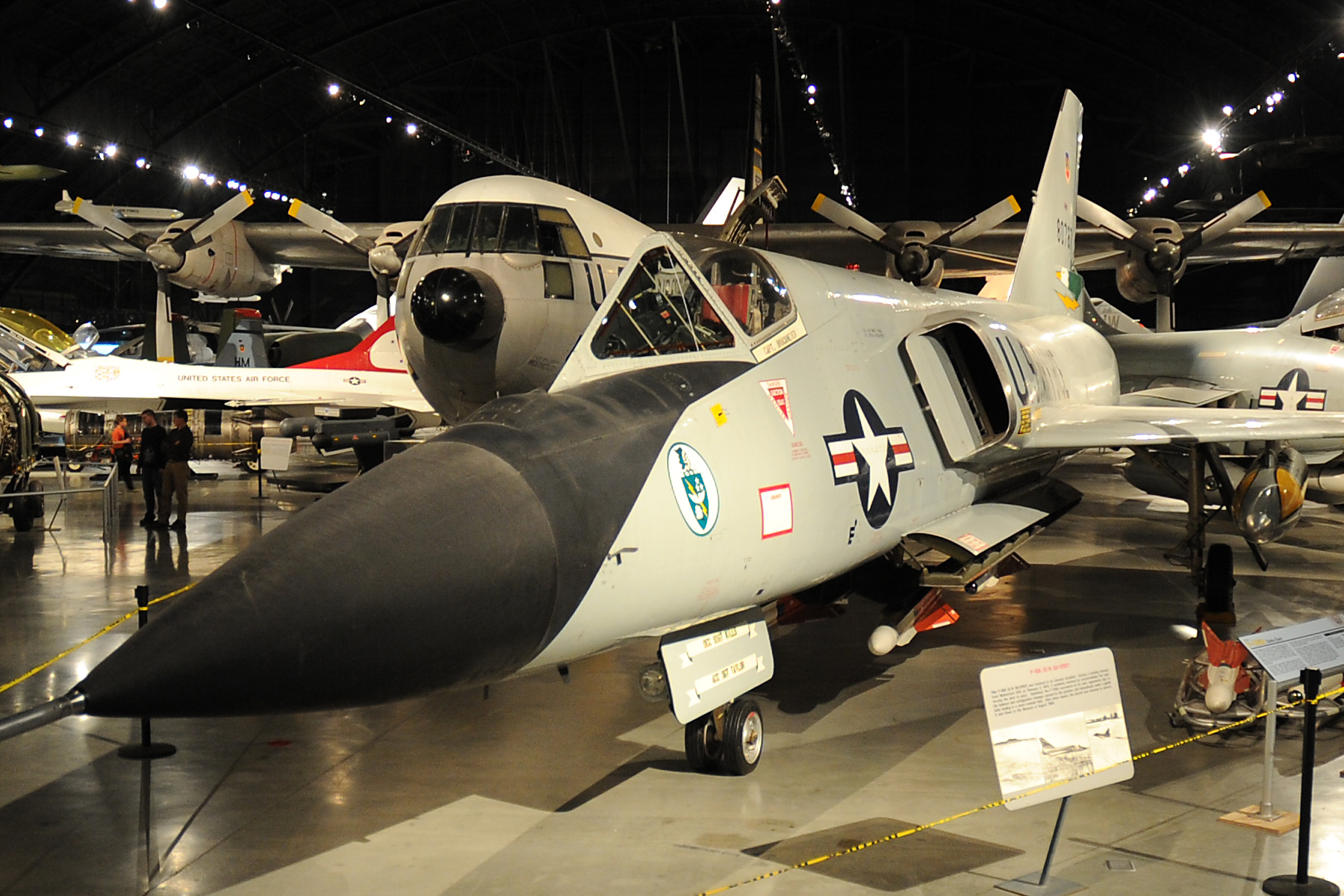
Convair F-106 Delta Dart Cornfield Bomber

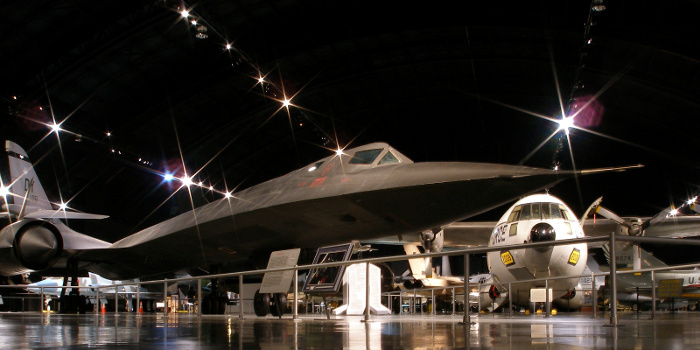
Lockheed SR-71A Blackbird

- Avro Canada CF-100 Canuck 18241
- Beech T-34 Mentor 53-3310
- Beechcraft MQM-107 Streaker
- Bell-Boeing CV-22B Osprey 99-0021
- Boeing B-1B Lancer 84-0051 "Boss Hog"
- Boeing RB-47H Stratojet 53-4299
- Boeing WB-50D Superfortress 49-0310
- Boeing KC-97L Stratofreighter 52-2630 "Zeppelinheim"
- Cessna U-3A 58-2124
- Cessna LC-126 49-1949
- Cessna 172 N9344L – Unveiled during a private event on September 11, 2024
- Cessna T-37B Tweet 57-2289
- Cessna T-41A Mescalero 65-5251
- Convair B-36J "Peacemaker" 52-2220
- Convair B-58 Hustler 59-2458 "Cowtown Hustler"
- Convair F-102A Delta Dagger 56-1416
- Convair F-106A Delta Dart 58-0787 – Cornfield Bomber
- De Havilland Canada U-6A Beaver 51-16501
- Douglas C-133A Cargomaster 56-2008
- Fairchild Republic A-10A Thunderbolt II 78-0681
- General Atomics RQ-1K Predator 94-3009
- General Dynamics EF-111A Raven 66-0057
- General Dynamics F-16A Fighting Falcon 81-0663
- Grumman HU-16 Albatross 51-5282
- Grumman J2F-6 Duck 33587 – painted as OA-12 8563
- Lockheed AC-130A Spectre 54-1630 "Azrael"
- Lockheed D-21B
- Lockheed XF-90A 46-0688
- Lockheed F-94C Starfire 50-980
- Lockheed F-104C Starfighter 56-914
- Lockheed F-117A Nighthawk 79-10781
- Lockheed SR-71A Blackbird 61-7976
- Lockheed T-33A 53-5974
- Lockheed U-2A 56-6722
- Martin RB-57D 53-3982
- McDonnell F-101B Voodoo 58-325
- McDonnell Douglas F-4G Phantom II 69-7263
- McDonnell Douglas RF-4C Phantom II 64-1047
- McDonnell Douglas F-15A Eagle 76-027
- McDonnell Douglas F-15C Eagle 86-0156
- Mikoyan-Gurevich MiG-19S
- Mikoyan-Gurevich MiG-23MS
- Mikoyan-Gurevich MiG-29A 2960516761
- North American F-82B Twin Mustang 44‐65168
- North American F-86D Sabre 50-0477
- North American F-86H Sabre 53-1352
- North American RF-86F Sabre 52-4492
- North American F-100D Super Sabre 55‐3754
- North American JT-28A Trojan 49-1494
- Northrop B-2A Spirit – static test mock-up
- Northrop BQM-74C
- Northrop F-89J Scorpion 52-1911 – painted as 53-2509
- Northrop AT-38B Talon 63-8172
- Panavia Tornado GR4 ZA374 "Miss Behavin'"
- Piper L-4A 42-36446 – painted as J-3C-65-8 NC42050
- Republic F-84F Thunderstreak 52-6526
- Republic RF-84K Thunderflash 52‐7259
- Radioplane OQ-19D
- Ryan AQM-34N
- Ryan BQM-34 Firebee
- Sikorsky MH-53M 68‐10357
- Sikorsky HH-60G Pave Hawk
- Sukhoi Su-27UB
- Teledyne-Ryan AQM-91A Compass Arrow
- Vertol CH-21B Workhorse 51-15857

=== Missile Gallery ===
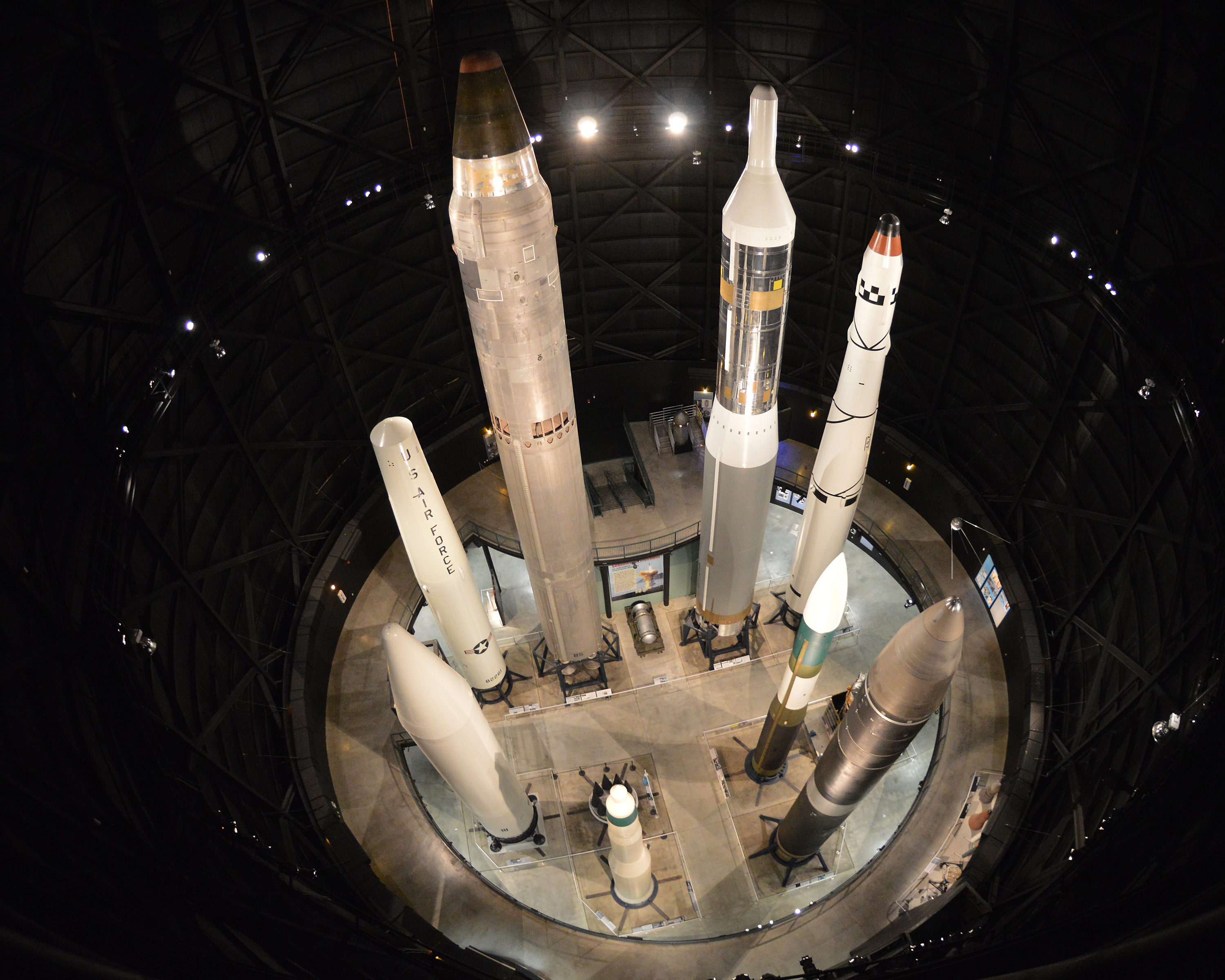
Missile Gallery overview

- Boeing LGM-30A Minuteman IA
- Boeing LGM-30G Minuteman III
- Chrysler SM-78/PGM-19A Jupiter
- Douglas SM-75/PGM-17A Thor
- Martin Marietta LCG-118A Peacekeeper
- Martin Marietta SM-68A/HGM-25A Titan I
- Martin Marietta SM-68B/LGM-25C Titan II
- Thor-Agena A

=== Space Gallery ===
- Boeing X-40
- Fairchild C-119 Flying Boxcar 51-8037
- Martin Marietta SV-5J – configured as X-24A
- Martin Marietta X-24B 66‐13551
- North American X-15 56-6671
- Apollo 15 Command Module
- Gemini B experimental capsule for the Manned Orbiting Laboratory
- KH-7 Gambit reconnaissance satellite
- KH-8 Gambit 3
- KH-9 Hexagon
- Vought ASM-135A Anti-Satellite Missile
- Defense Support Program satellite
- Inertial Upper Stage
- Teal Ruby satellite
- Lockheed Martin Titan IVB Rocket
- Mercury spacecraft, production model
- Space Shuttle Crew Compartment Trainer (CCT-1)

=== Research and Development Gallery ===
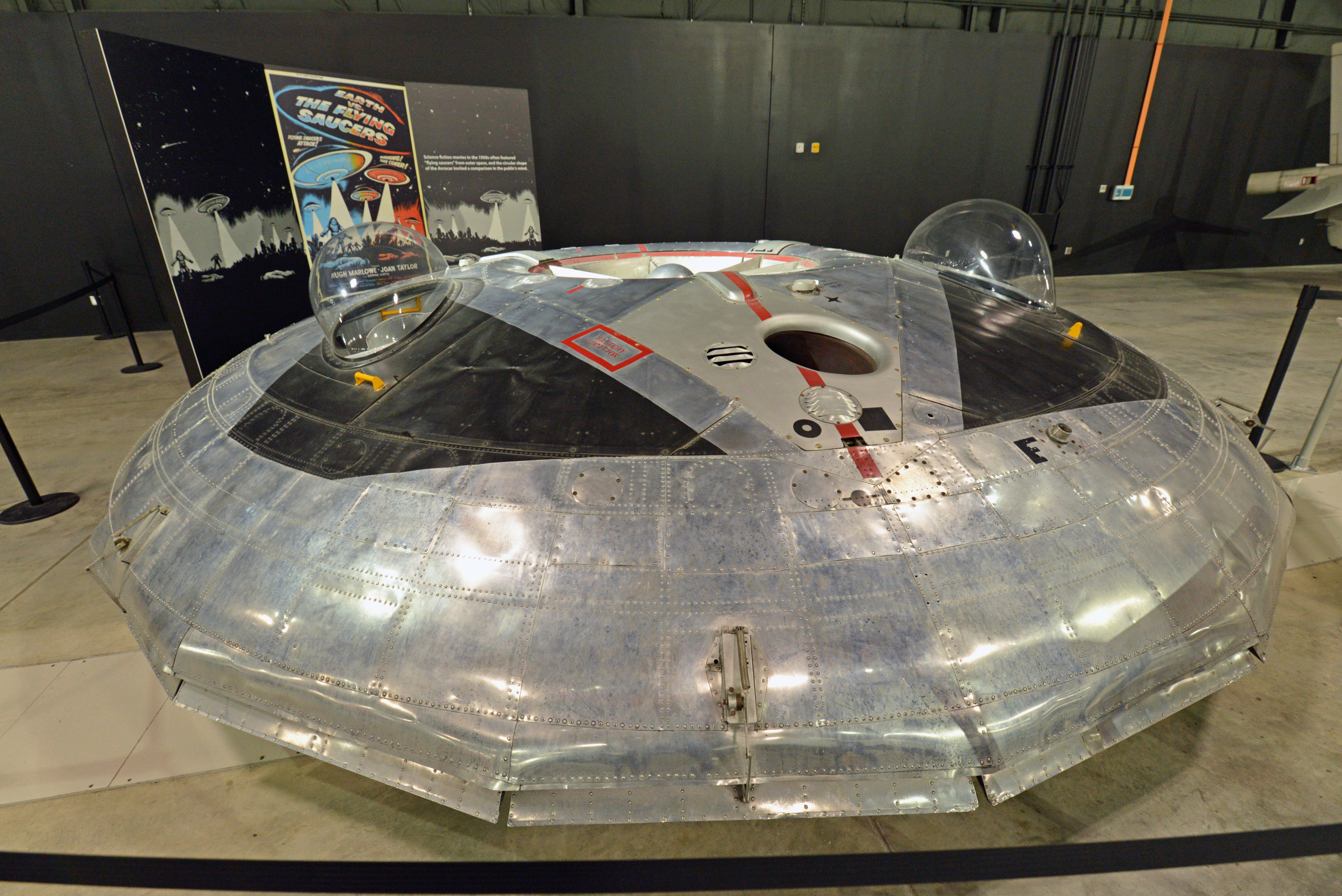
Avro Canada VZ-9 Avrocar

- American Helicopter XH-26 Jet Jeep 50‐1841
- Avro Canada VZ-9 Avrocar 58-7055
- Bell P-59B Airacomet 44-22650
- Bell X-1B 48-1385
- Bell X-5 50-1838
- Bell XGAM-63 Rascal
- Bell XV-3 54‐148
- Bensen X-25A 68‐10770
- Boeing X-32
- Boeing X-45
- Boeing YQM-94A Compass Cope B
- Convair XF-92A 46-0682
- Douglas X-3 Stiletto 49‐2892
- Fairchild XSM-73 Bull Goose
- Fisher P-75A Eagle 44-44553
- Grumman X-29A 82-0003
- Hawker Siddeley XV-6A Kestrel
- Kratos XQ-58 Valkyrie
- LTV XC-142A 62‐5924
- Lockheed YF-12A 60-6935
- Lockheed NT-33A 51‐4120
- Lockheed P-80R
- Lockheed Martin X-44A
- Lockheed Martin RQ-3 DarkStar
- McDonnell XF-85 Goblin 46-0523
- McDonnell XH-20 Little Henry
- McDonnell Douglas F-15A Eagle 72‐0119 "Streak Eagle" – time-to-climb record holder
- McDonnell Douglas X-36
- North American X-10
- North American XB-70 Valkyrie 62‐001
- Northrop Tacit Blue
- Northrop YF-23 87‐0800
- Northrop X-4 Bantam 46-0677
- Republic XF-84H 51-17059
- Republic YRF-84F FICON 49-2430
- Republic XF-91 Thunderceptor 46-0680
- Ryan X-13 Vertijet 54-1620
- Ryan BQM-34F Firebee II
- Scaled Composites Long-EZ 03-0001
- Teledyne Ryan XAQM-81A Firebolt

=== Global Reach Gallery ===
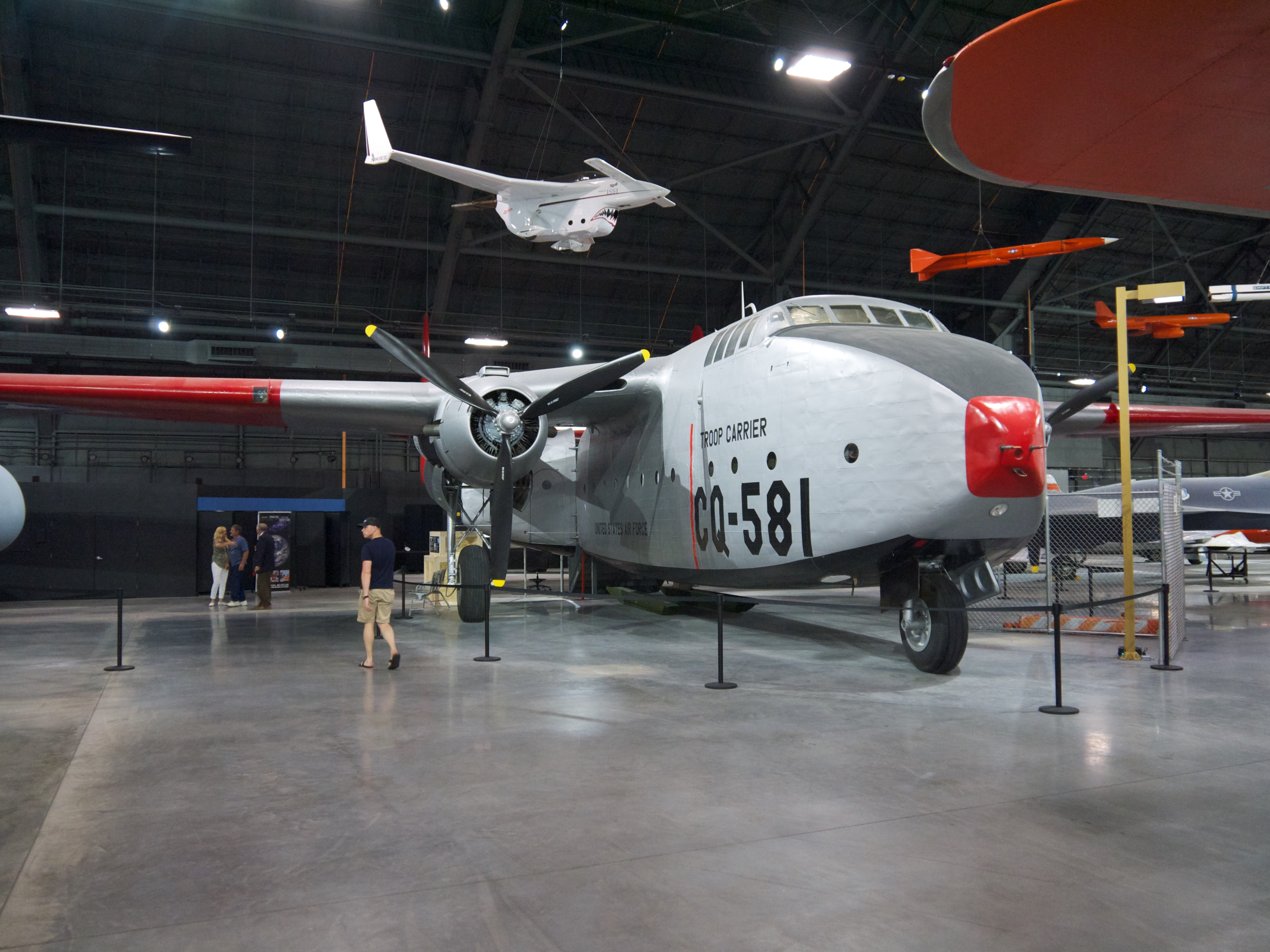
Fairchild C-82 Packet

- Fairchild C-82 Packet 48-581
- Learjet C-21A 84-0064
- Lockheed C-130E Hercules 62-1787 "Spare 617"
- Lockheed C-141C Starlifter 66-0177 "Hanoi Taxi"

=== Presidential Gallery ===
- Aero Commander U-4B 55-4647
- Beech VC-6A 66-7943 "Lady Bird Special"
- Bell UH-13J Sioux 57-2728
- Boeing VC-137C 62-6000 SAM 26000
- Douglas VC-54C 42-107451 "Sacred Cow"
- Douglas VC-118 46-505 "Independence"
- Lockheed VC-121E 53-7885 "Columbine III"
- Lockheed VC-140B JetStar 61-2492
- North American T-39A Sabreliner 62-4478

=== Air park ===
- Boeing C-17 Globemaster III 87‐0025
- Boeing EC-135E ARIA 60-374 "Bird of Prey"
- Boeing KC-135R Stratotanker 60-0329
- Convair NC-131H Samaritan 53‐7793
- McDonnell Douglas F-15A Eagle 74-0117

=== Under restoration ===
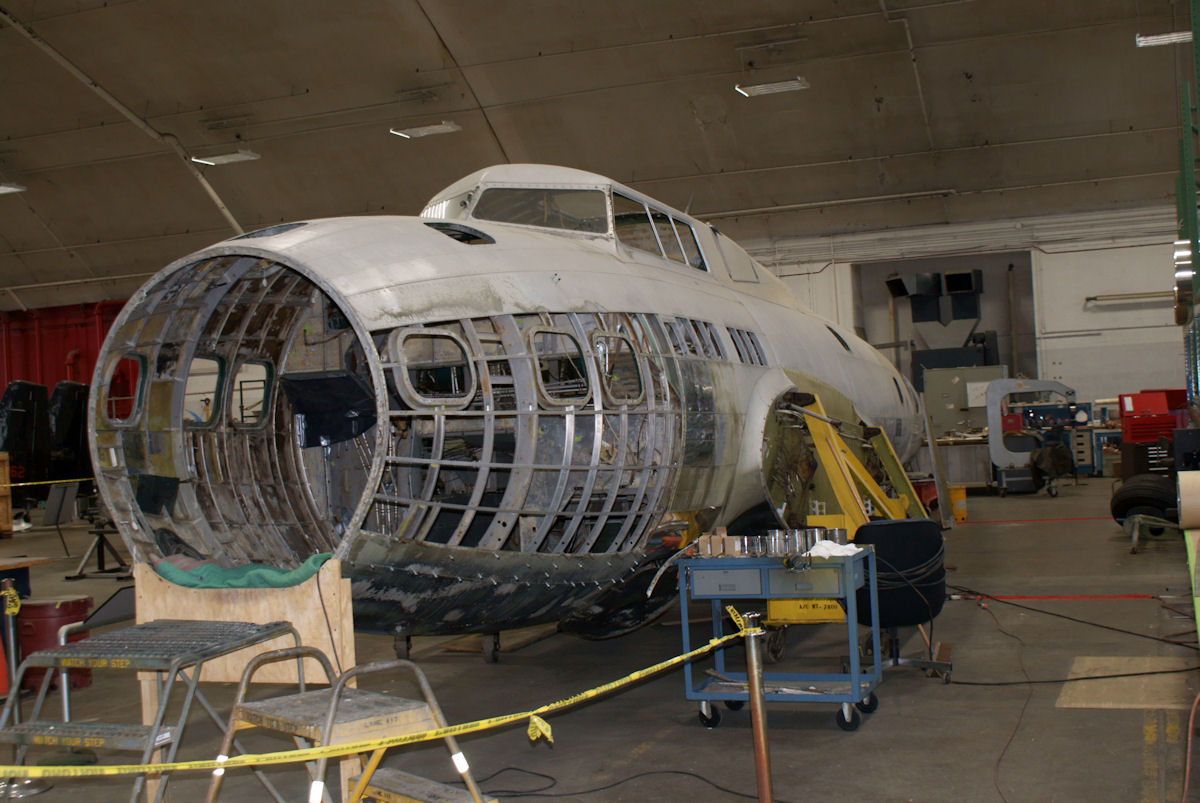
Boeing B-17D Flying Fortress

- Boeing B-17D Flying Fortress 40-3097 The Swoose
- Fieseler Fi 156 C-1 Storch 4389
- Kellett XR-8

=== Storage ===
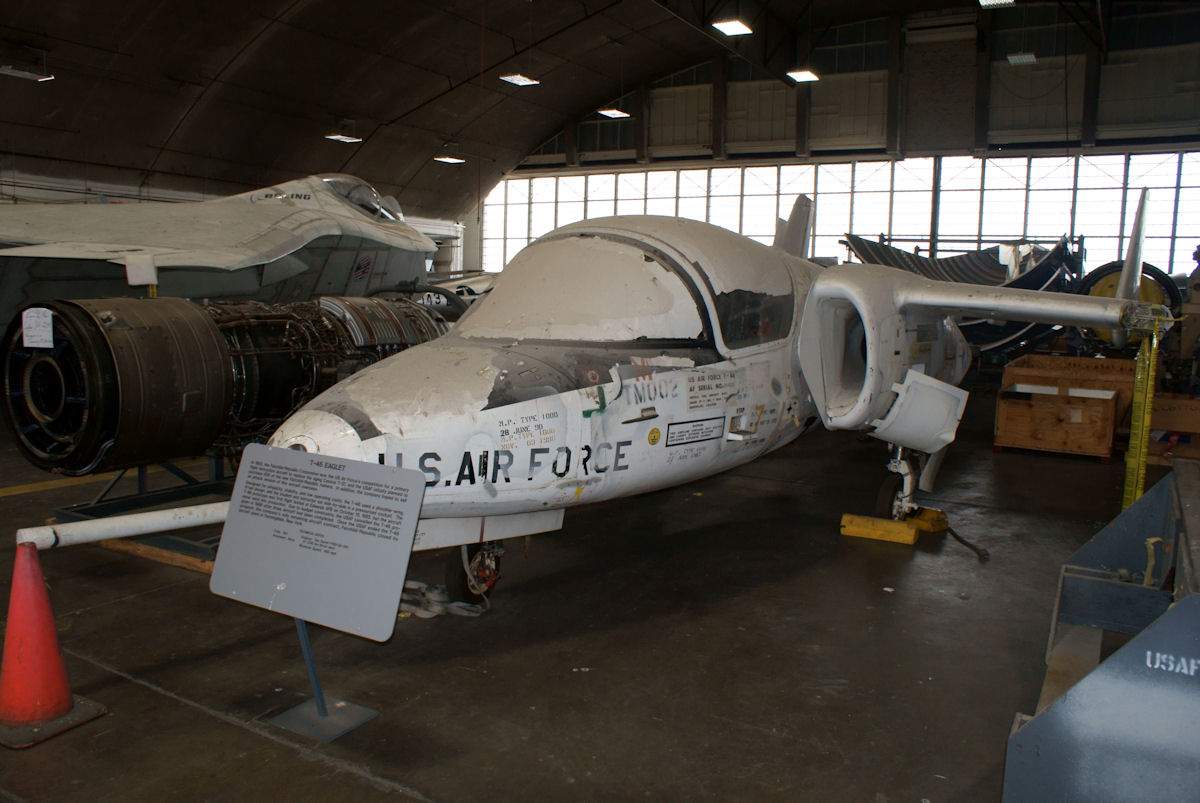
Fairchild-Republic T-46 Eaglet

- Beechcraft PC-9 Mk II PT-3 – prototype for the T-6 program
- Beechcraft T-6A Texan II 06-3851
- Boeing NKC-135A 55-3123
- Caquot Type R
- CASA 2.111H B.2I-29
- CASA 352L T.2B-244
- Convair XP-81 44‐91000
- Convair XP-81 44‐91001
- Curtiss-Wright X-19 62-12198
- Dassault Mystere IVA
- Douglas B-23A Dragon 39-0037
- Douglas C-39 38-515
- Douglas O-46A 35‐179
- Douglas XB-42A Mixmaster 43-50224.
- Douglas XB-43 Jetmaster 44-61509.
- Ercoupe 415-C (YO-55) 86
- Fairchild PT-26
- Fairchild Republic T-46A 84-0493
- General Dynamics NF-16A Fighting Falcon 75-0750
- General Dynamics F-111F Aardvark 70-2390
- Hawker Beechcraft MC-12W Liberty
- Lavochkin La-17M
- Lockheed C-60A Lodestar 43‐16445
- Lockheed RB-34 Lexington AJ311.
- Lockheed AC-130A Hercules 54-1626
- Luscombe 8A (UC-90)
- McDonnell Douglas YF-4E Phantom II 62‐12200
- McDonnell Douglas KC-10A Extender 84-0191
- Mikoyan-Gurevich MiG-21
- Mikoyan-Gurevich MiG-23MLD
- Mikoyan-Gurevich MiG-25RB 020657
- North American F-107A 55-5119
- Northrop YC-125B Raider 48-626 – painted as 48-622
- Pratt-Read TG-32 31523
- Sikorsky H-5G 48‐539
- Sikorsky S-51 51.22
- Stearman PT-17 Kaydet 41-25454
- Sukhoi Su-22M-4 31203
