= Jellett =

Jellett is a surname. Notable people with the surname include:

- John Hewitt Jellett (1817–1888), college head, provost of Trinity College, Dublin
- Eva Jellett, first woman to graduate in medicine from Trinity College, Dublin
- Henry Jellett (priest) (died 1901), Irish Anglican priest and Dean of St Patrick's Cathedral, Dublin, father of the gynaecologist
- William Jellett (1857–1936), Irish Unionist Member of Parliament in the UK Parliament
- Edwin Jellett (1860–1929), American writer from Germantown, Philadelphia
- Henry Jellett (gynaecologist) (1872–1948), Irish gynaecologist and author, son of the dean
- Mainie Jellett (1897–1944), Irish painter
- John Holmes Jellett (1905–1971), British civil engineer
- Rob Jellett, Canadian local politician – City Councillor in Ottawa, Ontario

== See also ==
- Cellettes (disambiguation)
- Kellet (disambiguation)
