= Kellett KD-1 =

1930s American autogyro

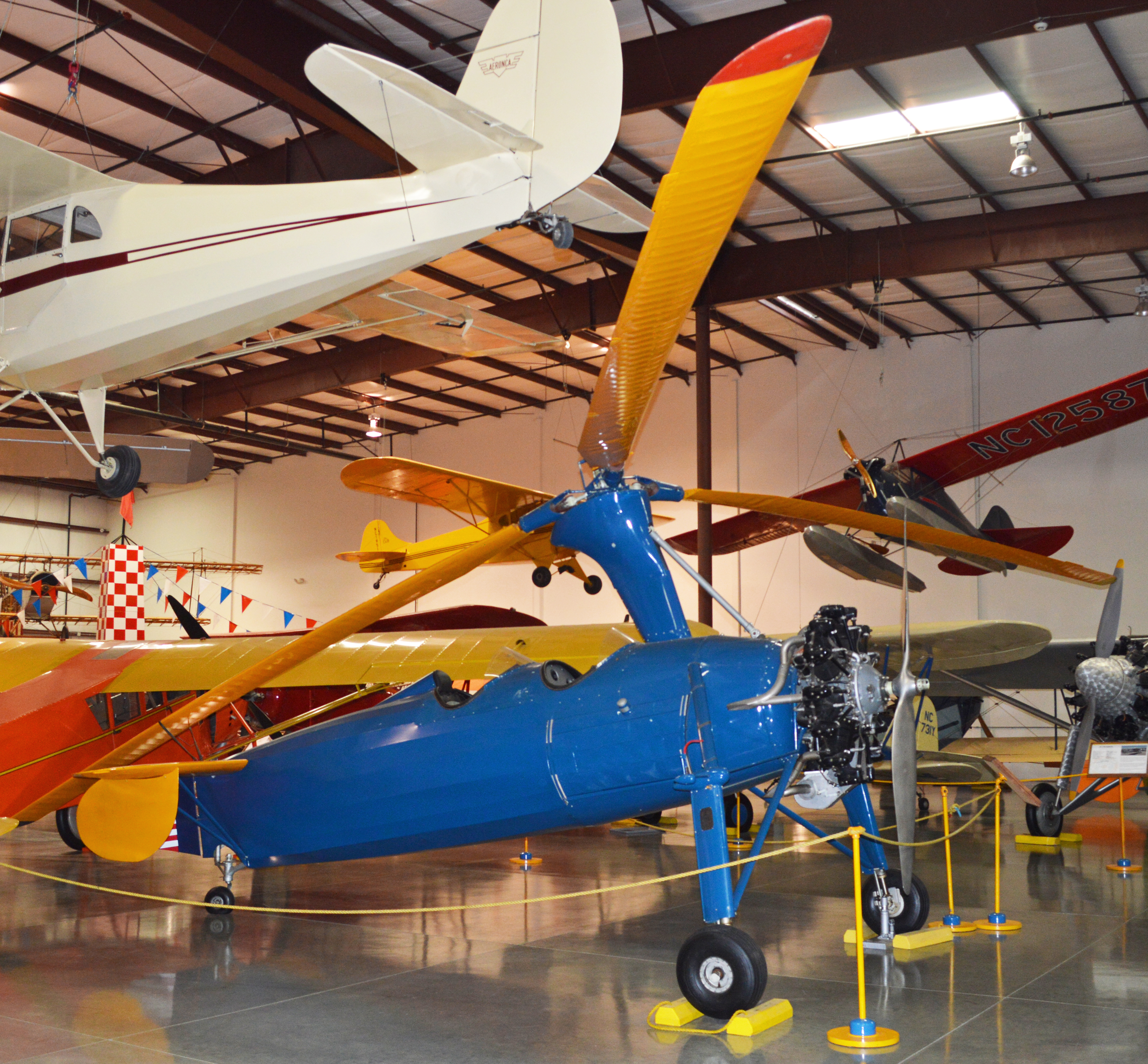
- Kellett XR-3 modification of YG-1B (KD-1) of U.S. Army preserved at Yanks Air Museum, Chino airfield California, in February 2016

General information
- Type: Autogyro
- National origin: United States
- Manufacturer: Kellett Autogiro Company
- Primary users: United States Army Air Forces Eastern Airlines

History
- First flight: 1934
- Developed into: Kayaba Ka-1/Ka-2

The Kellett KD-1 is a 1930s American autogyro built by the Kellett Autogiro Company. It had the distinction of being the first practical rotary-wing aircraft used by the United States Army and inaugurated the first scheduled air-mail service using a rotary-wing aircraft.

== Development ==
Using the experience gained in building Cierva autogyros under licence the Kellett Autogiro Company developed the KD-1 which was similar to the contemporary Cierva C.30. It had two open cockpits, a fixed tailwheel landing gear and was powered by a 225 hp (168 kW) Jacobs L-4 radial engine. The D in the KD-1 designation stood for Direct control, meaning that the rotor was responsible for all control of the machine, so ailerons, wings and elevators were not necessary. This caused distrust from Kellett's test pilots, who refused to fly it. Kellett then hired Johnny Miller, who thoroughly understood autogyros, as chief test pilot. After successful testing of the prototype, it was converted into a mail-carrying variant designated the KD-1A which had the front cockpit converted into a baggage compartment and was put into production. It had a three-bladed rotor with folding blades and a number of minor detail improvements. A KD-1B was a development of the KD-1A, with an enclosed cockpit for the pilot, radio, blind-flying instruments and a landing light, and was ordered and operated by Eastern Air Lines, who hired Miller to fly it.

They inaugurated the first scheduled rotary-wing air-mail service on 6 July 1939 between Camden Central Airport and Philadelphia's main Post Office.

In 1935, the United States Army bought a KD-1 for evaluation and designated it the YG-1, a second aircraft followed which had additional radio equipment and was designated the YG-1A. These two aircraft were followed by a batch of seven designated YG-1B. In 1942 seven more were bought for use in the observation role as the XO-60. Six XO-60s were re-engined with 300 hp (224 kW) Jacobs R-915-3s and re-designated YO-60. One YG-1B was modified with a constant-speed rotor and was re-designated the YG-1C, it was later re-engined with the more powerful R-915 and re-designated again as the XR-2. The XR-2 was destroyed by rotor ground resonance problems and the evaluation was continued with another modified YG-1B designated the XR-3.

== Variants ==
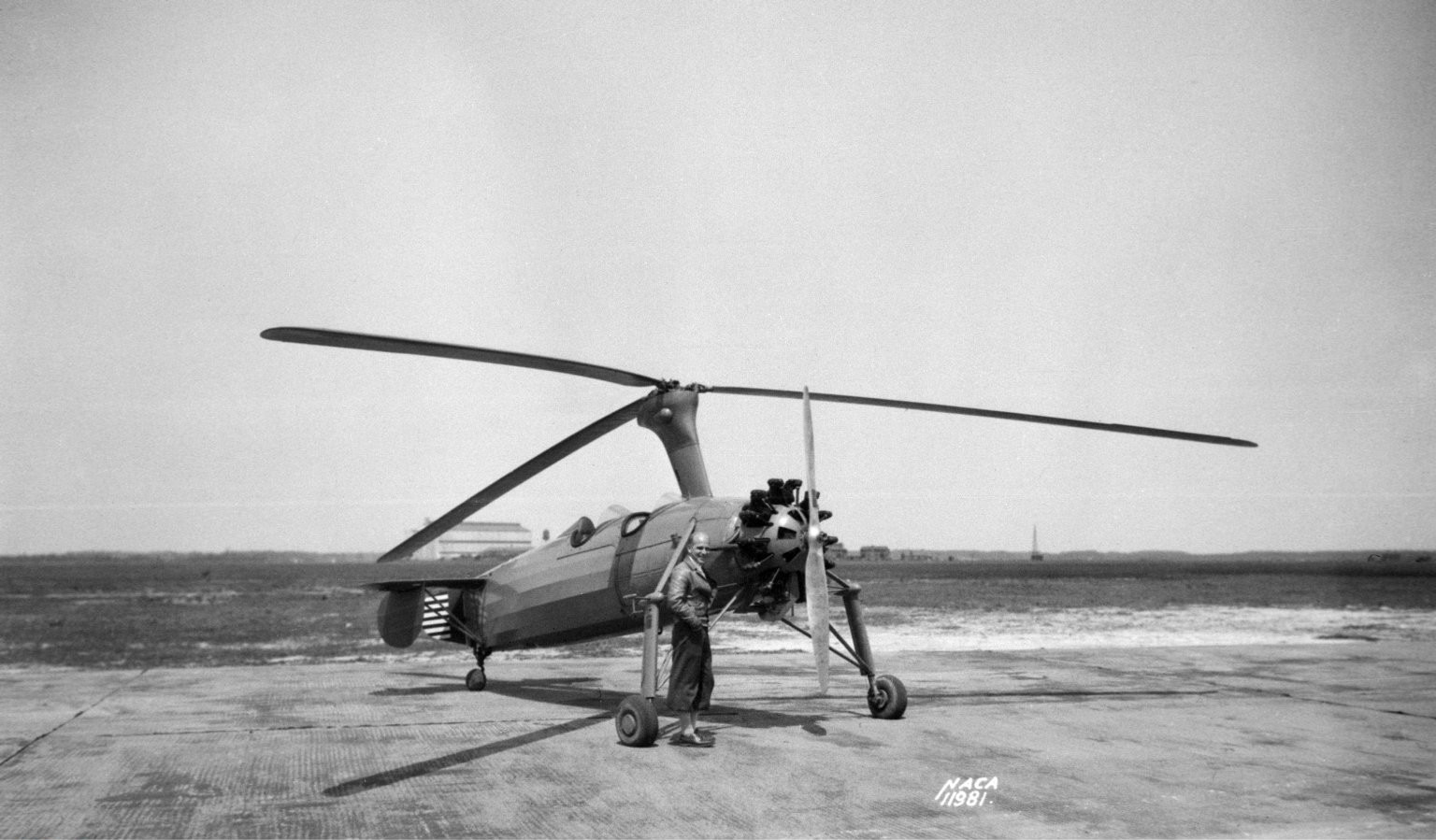
YG-1 (KD-1) at Langley

KD-1
Prototype, one built
KD-1A
Commercial variant with open cockpit and a 225 hp (168 kW) Jacobs L-4 radial engine; three built, one converted from the KD-1.
KD-1B
Commercial variant with enclosed cockpit; two built.
YG-1
United States Army designation for one KD-1A acquired for evaluation.
YG-1A
One aircraft as YG-1 with the addition of radio equipment.

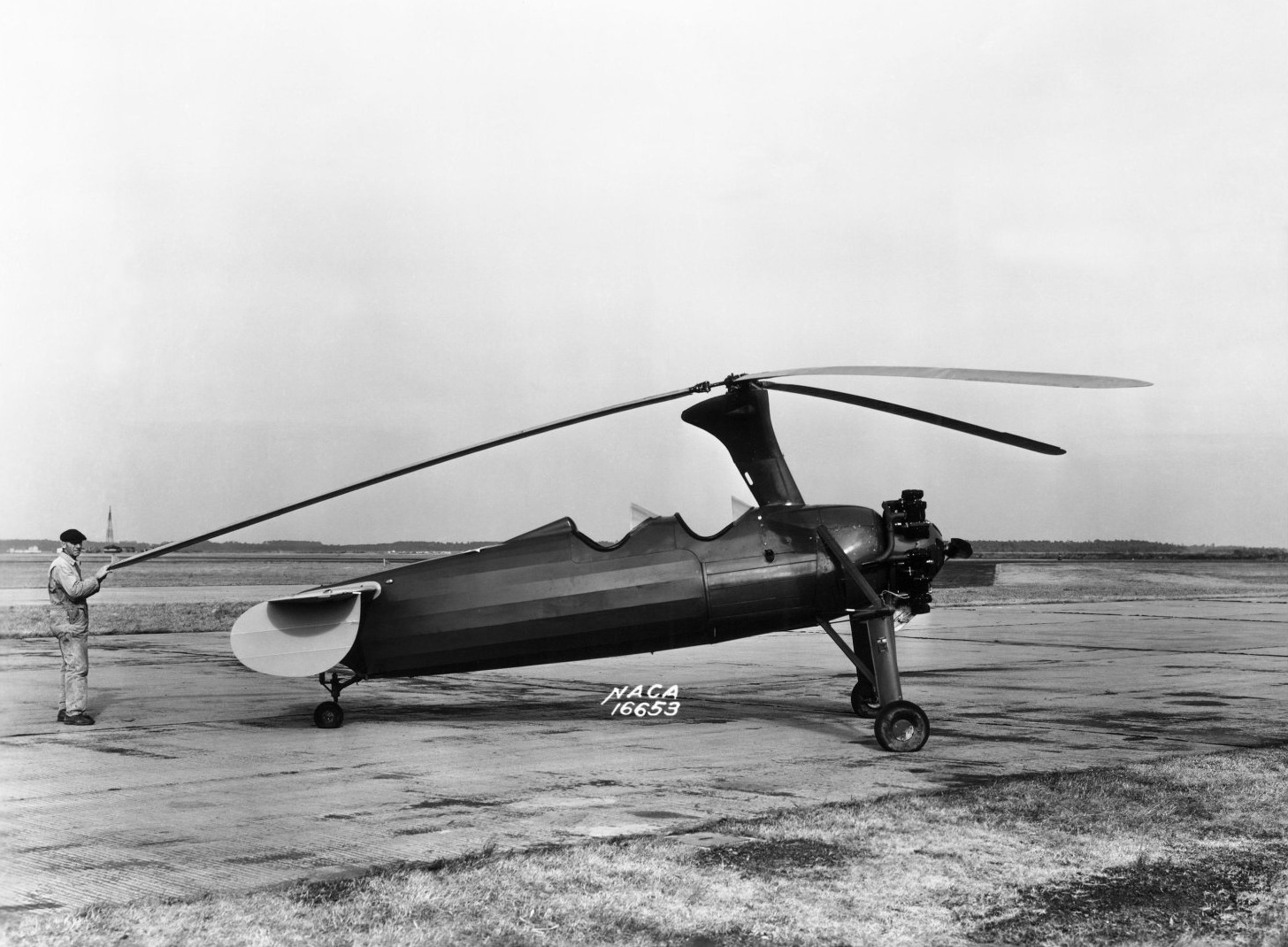
YG-1B at Langley

YG-1B
Production aircraft for the United States Army; seven built.
YG-1C
One YG-1B modified with a constant-speed rotor for evaluation, later designated the XR-2.

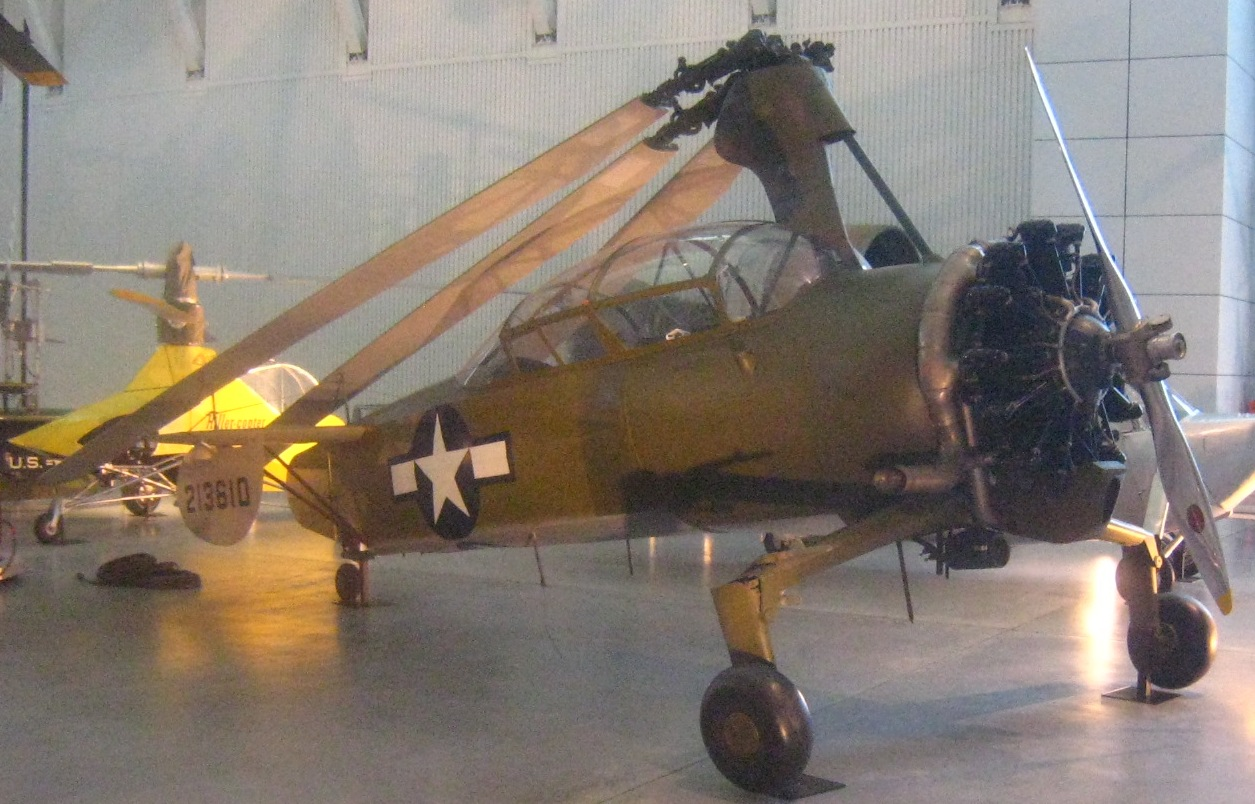
A Kellett XO-60

XO-60
Production aircraft for the United States Army with a 225 hp (168 kW) Jacobs R-755 radial engine, seven built.
YO-60
Six XO-60s re-engined with a 300 hp (220 kW) Jacob R-915-3 radial engine.
XR-2
The YG-1C re-designated after being re-engined with a 300 hp (220 kW) Jacobs R-915-3 radial engine.
XR-3
One YG-1B modified to XR-2 standard for evaluation.
Kayaba Ka-Go prototype
Based on a KD-1A airframe repaired by Kayaba.

== Operators ==
United States

- Eastern Airlines
- United States Army Air Forces

== Specifications (KD-1B) ==
General characteristics

- Crew: 2
- Length: 28 ft 10 in (8.79 m)
- Height: 10 ft 3 in (3.12 m)
- Gross weight: 2,244 lb (1,018 kg)
- Powerplant: 1 × Jacobs L-4MA , 230 hp (170 kW)
- Main rotor diameter: 40 ft 0 in (12.19 m)

Performance

- Maximum speed: 125 mph (201 km/h, 109 kn)
- Range: 200 mi (322 km, 174 nmi)
- Service ceiling: 13,999 ft (4,267 m)

== See also ==
Related development

- Kayaba Ka-1/Ka-2

Aircraft of comparable role, configuration, and era

- Avian Gyroplane
- Buhl A-1 Autogyro
- Cierva C.30
- Kellett K-2
- Pitcairn PA-18

Related lists

- List of rotorcraft
- List of military aircraft of the United States
