= Kellett K-2 =

Two-seat autogyro

K-2, K-3, and K-4
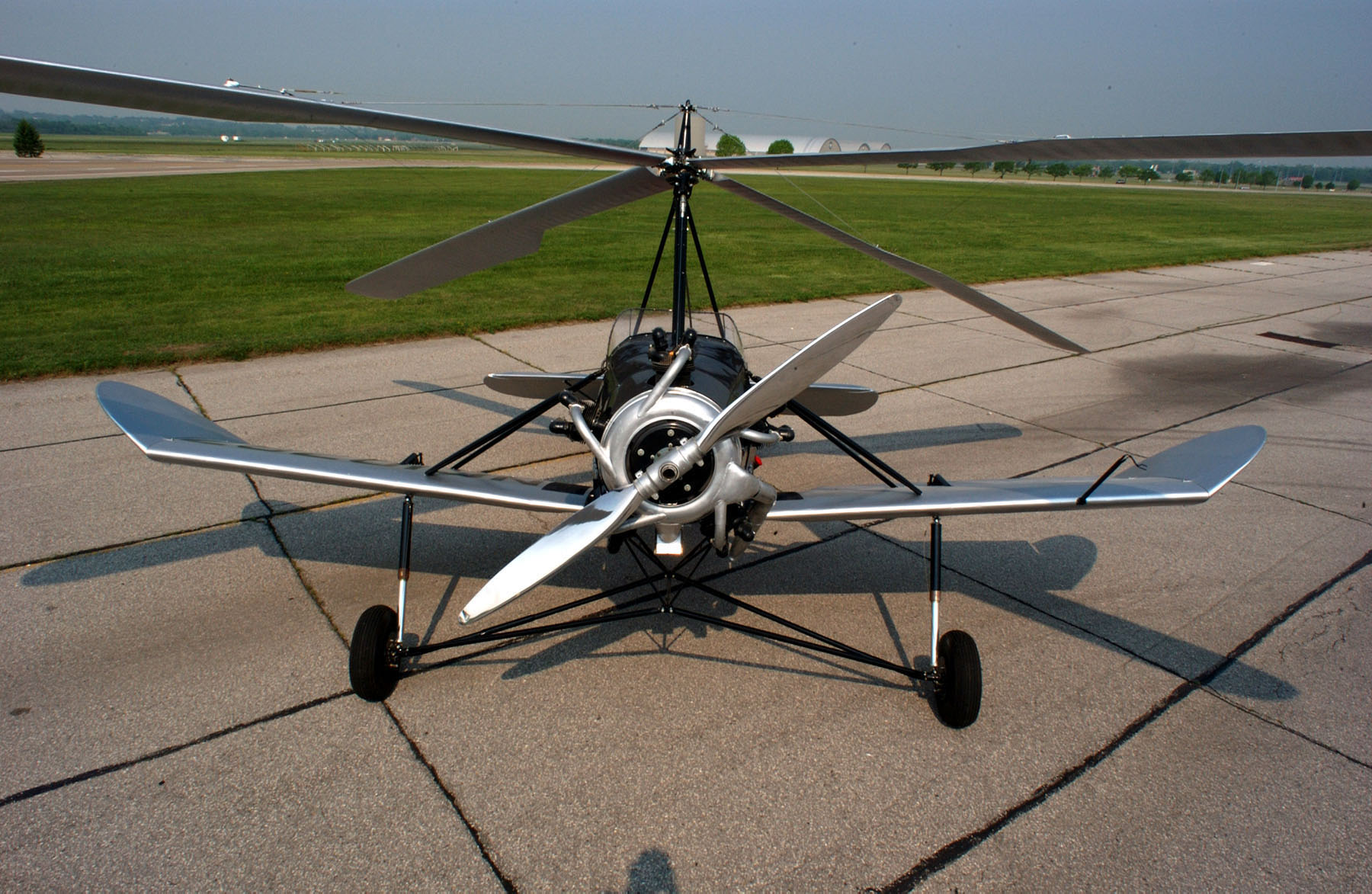

General information
- Type: Utility autogyro
- National origin: United States
- Manufacturer: Kellett Autogiro Corporation
- Number built: 16

History
- First flight: April 24, 1931

The Kellett K-2 is a two-seat autogyro developed in the United States in the early 1930s. Later examples were designated K-3 and K-4 when equipped with more powerful engines.

== Design and development ==
In design, it was similar to the Cierva and Pitcairn autogyros of the day; an airplane-like fuselage with a nose-mounted engine, surmounted by a rotor mast. Like some of Cierva's designs, the K-2 also featured stubby fixed wings for additional lift, also as a mount for ailerons for lateral control. The pilot and a single passenger sat side by side in an open cockpit, although a folding canopy (similar to that of a convertible automobile) was available as an optional extra. The first flight took place on April 24, 1931, and certification by the Department of Commerce was granted on May 27.

Kellett built a batch of 12 K-2s, and the type was evaluated by the United States Army as a slow-flying reconnaissance machine to observe enemy troop movements. Its performance was, however, judged to be too limited for military use.

The K-3 of 1932 was virtually identical, but featured a Kinner engine in place of the original Continental Motors unit. One of these machines (c/n 18, registration NR12615) became the first rotary-wing aircraft to fly in the Antarctica, when taken there on Richard E. Byrd's second Antarctic expedition in 1933-34. It crashed in Antarctica on September 28, 1934 and was left there. Two K-3s were also sold to the Japanese War Office.

A K-2 (c/n 2, originally registered NC10767) was discovered derelict in a barn and restored to flying condition by Al Letcher of Mojave in 2002. This machine had been used in the Army evaluation of 1931, and in 2008 is displayed at the National Museum of the United States Air Force.

== Variants ==
- K-2 - original version with 165-170 hp Continental A-70 7-cyl. radial engine (12 built)
  - K-2A - version with Continental R-670 engine (four converted from K-2)
- K-3 - version with Kinner C-5 engine (four built, plus two converted from K-2)
- K-4 - version with Continental R-670 (one converted from K-2)

== Specifications (K-3) ==
General characteristics

- Crew: one pilot
- Capacity: one passenger
- Length: 19 ft 6 in (5.94 m)
- Wingspan: 26 ft 0 in (7.92 m)
- Empty weight: 1,647 lb (748 kg)
- Gross weight: 2,400 lb (1,090 kg)
- Powerplant: 1 × Kinner C-5 , 210 hp (160 kW)
- Main rotor diameter: 41 ft 0 in (12.50 m)
- Main rotor area: 1,320 sq ft (122.7 m^{2})

Performance

- Maximum speed: 110 mph (180 km/h, 96 kn)
- Range: 250 mi (400 km, 220 nmi)
- Service ceiling: 10,000 ft (3,000 m)

== See also ==
Aircraft of comparable role, configuration, and era

- Avian Gyroplane
- Buhl A-1 Autogyro
- Cierva C.19
- Kellett KD-1
- Pitcairn PA-18
- Pitcairn PCA-2
