= Cellettes =

Cellettes is the name of the following communes in France:

- Cellettes, Charente, in the Charente department
- Cellettes, Loir-et-Cher, in the Loir-et-Cher department

== See also ==
- La Cellette (disambiguation)
