= Kellett Autogiro Corporation =

US aircraft manufacturer

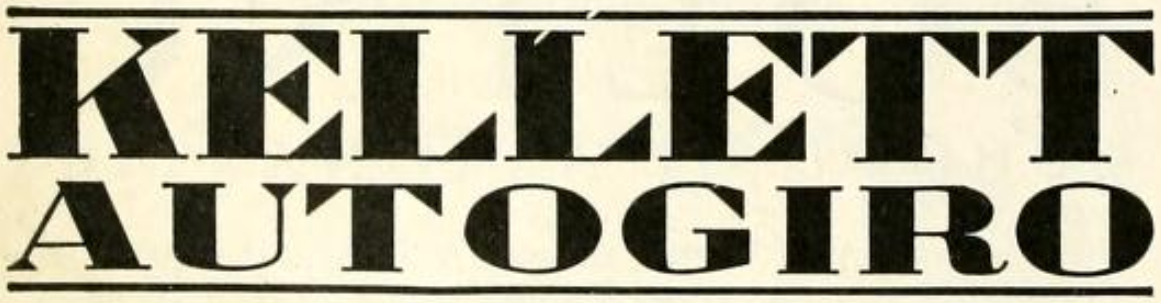

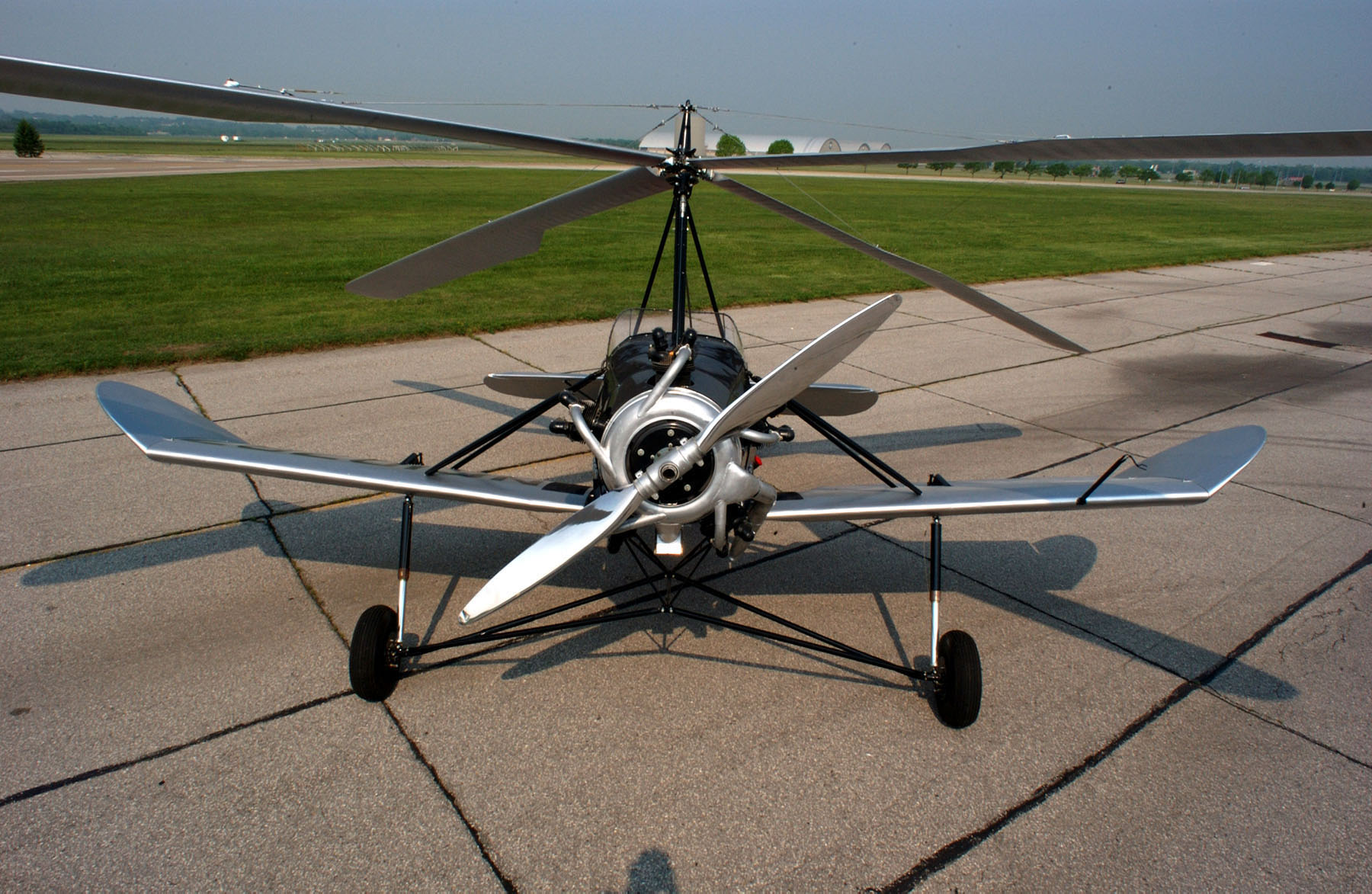
- Kellett K-2
- Industry: Aerospace
- Founded: 1929
- Founder: W. Wallace Kellett

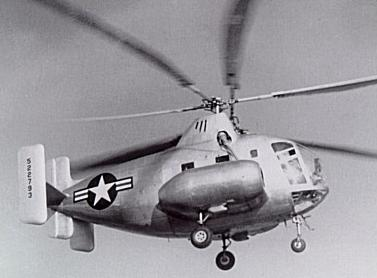
Kellett XR-10

The Kellett Autogiro Corporation was an American aircraft manufacturer from 1929 based in Philadelphia, named after founder W. Wallace Kellett.

== History ==
The Kellett Aircraft was formed by W. Wallace Kellett and C. Townsend Ludington and their brothers, Rodney Kellett and Nicholas Ludington. In 1931, Kellett Autogiro licensed, from the Autogiro Company of America, Juan de la Cierva's and Harold Pitcairn's patents for rotary-wing aircraft. The first three designed were all typical Cierva designs and the more advanced KD-1 was similar to the contemporary Cierva C.30. The KD-1/G-1 was the first practical rotary-wing aircraft used by the United States Army. The company stopped building autogyros in the late 1940s and switched to the design of helicopters. In the 1950s it built some ultra-light helicopters the RH-1 to test some rotor features and its last design the K-25 was an experimental convertiplane using tilt-rotors.

== Aircraft ==
Model name	First flight	Number built	Type
Kellett K-2	1931	12	Utility autogyro
Kellett K-3		4-6	Re-engined version of K-2
Kellett K-4		1	Re-engined version of K-2
Kellett KD-1	1934		Utility autogyro
Kellett XR-8	1944	2	Single engine intermeshing rotor prototype military helicopter
Kellett XR-10	1947	2	Twin engine intermeshing rotor prototype military helicopter
Kellett KH-15	1954		Flying platform
Kellett K-25			Twin engine convertiplane

== Bibliography ==
- The Illustrated Encyclopedia of Aircraft (Part Work 1982-1985). Orbis Publishing. p. 2254.
- Gunston, Bill (1993). World Encyclopedia of Aircraft Manufacturers. Annapolis: Naval Institute Press. p. 168.
