= Kellett XR-10 =

Military transport helicopter prototype

XR-10
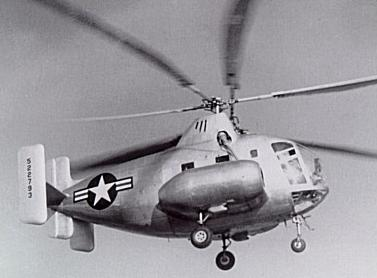

General information
- Type: Military transport helicopter
- National origin: United States
- Manufacturer: Kellett Autogiro Corporation
- Number built: 2

History
- First flight: 24 April 1947
- Developed from: Kellett XR-8

The Kellett XR-10 was a military transport helicopter developed in the United States in the 1940s that only flew in prototype form. It was designed in response to a USAAF Technical Instruction issued for the development of a helicopter to transport passengers, cargo, or wounded personnel within an enclosed fuselage. Kellett's proposal followed the general layout that the company was developing in the XR-8, with twin intermeshing rotors, and was accepted by the Air Force on 16 October over proposals by Sikorsky, Bell, and Platt-LePage.

The XR-10 resembled a scaled-up XR-8, although its twin engines were carried in nacelles at the fuselage sides, driving the rotors via long driveshafts, and the aircraft was skinned entirely in metal. The first of two prototypes flew on 24 April 1947, and at the time, was the largest rotorcraft to fly in the United States. During test-flights, however, the same problem that had been encountered with the XR-8's rotor system emerged when blades from the two rotors collided in flight. With fixes in place, flight testing continued, but on 3 October 1949, the first prototype crashed due to a control system failure and killed Kellett's chief test pilot, Dave Driskill. The project was abandoned shortly thereafter, and a 16-seat civil variant, the KH-2, never left the drawing board.

== Specifications ==
Data from Jane's All the World's Aircraft 1948

General characteristics

- Crew: Two pilots
- Capacity: 10 troops or 1,100 lb (500 kg) of cargo
- Length: 28 ft 8 in (8.74 m) (fuselage length)
- Height: 13 ft 9 in (4.19 m)
- Empty weight: 8,200 lb (3,719 kg)
- Gross weight: 11,000 lb (4,990 kg)
- Powerplant: 2 × Continental R-975-15 nine-cylinder radial engines, 525 hp (391 kW) each
- Main rotor diameter: 2 × 65 ft 0 in (19.81 m)
- Main rotor area: 3,320 sq ft (308 m^{2})

Performance

- Maximum speed: 120 mph (190 km/h, 100 kn)
- Range: 362 mi (583 km, 315 nmi)
- Endurance: 4.9 hr at 62 mph (100 km/h; 54 kn)
- Service ceiling: 6,000 ft (1,800 m) (hover ceiling)
