= Kellett baronets =

Baronetcy in the Baronetage of the United Kingdom

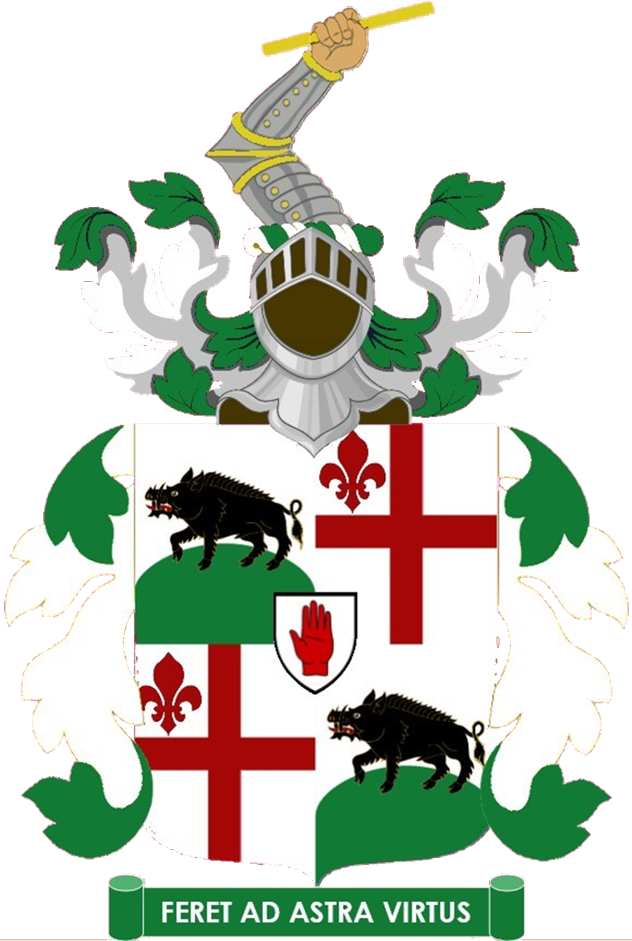
- Crest: An armed arm embowed and garnished Or holding in the hand a baton of the last.
- Shield: Quarterly: 1st and 4th Argent on a mount Vert a boar passant Sable. 2nd and 3rd Argent a cross Gules in the first quarter a fleur-de-lis of the last.
- Motto: Feret Ad Astra Virtus

The Kellett Baronetcy, of Lota in County Cork, is a title in the Baronetage of the United Kingdom. It was created on 6 August 1801 for Sir Richard Kellett, with remainder to the heirs male of his father Richard Kellett. On the death of the second Baronet in 1886 the title passed to the third Baronet, a descendant of Henry Kellett, younger brother of the first Baronet. However, he did not assume the title until 1906. The presumed fifth and sixth Baronets did not successfully prove their succession and were not on the Official Roll of the Baronetage. The presumed seventh Baronet has also not successfully proven his succession and is not on the Official Roll of the Baronetage, with the baronetcy considered dormant since 1966.

== Kellett baronets, of Lota (1801) ==
- Sir Richard Kellett, 1st Baronet (1761–1853)
- Sir William Henry Kellett, 2nd Baronet (1794–1886)
- Sir Henry de Castres Kellett, 3rd Baronet (1851–1924)
- Sir Henry de Castres Kellett, 4th Baronet (1882–1966)
- Henry de Castres Kellett, presumed 5th Baronet (1914–1966)
- Stanley Everard Kellett, presumed 6th Baronet (1911–1983)
- Stanley Charles Kellett, presumed 7th Baronet (born 1940)
