= Kellett XR-8 =

Helicopter built in the United States during World War II

XR-8
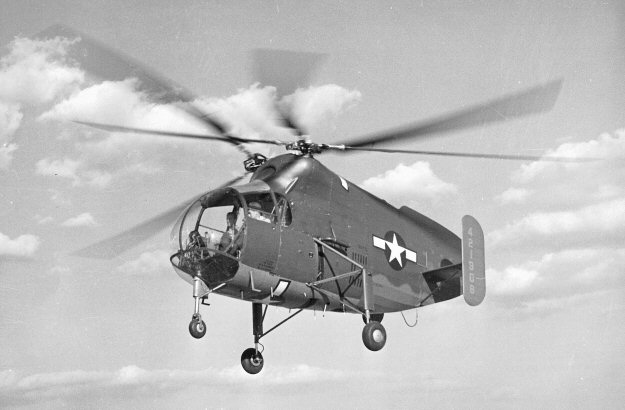

General information
- Type: Experimental helicopter
- National origin: United States
- Manufacturer: Kellett Autogiro Corporation
- Number built: 2

History
- First flight: 7 August 1944
- Variant: Kellett XR-10

The Kellett XR-8 (later redesignated XH-8) is a helicopter built in the United States during World War II. It was a two-seat machine intended to demonstrate the feasibility of a twin-rotor system and, while it accomplished this, it also demonstrated a number of problems that prevented further development of this particular design.

== Design and development ==
The successful demonstration of the Vought-Sikorsky VS-300 had the USAAF favoring the helicopter over the autogiro as an approach to rotary-winged flight. Realizing this, the Kellett Autogiro Corporation made a proposal to the USAAF on 11 November 1942 for the development of a twin-rotor helicopter that would eliminate the need for a tail rotor and its attendant loss of power. Initially discounted on theoretical grounds, the proposal was re-examined in the light of tests done with models by the Army's Experimental Engineering Section, and was accepted on 7 January the following year. This was followed on 11 September with a contract for nearly $1,000,000 to build two prototypes with the three-bladed rotors contained in Kellett's proposal, along with an alternative two-bladed system.

The resulting aircraft had a stubby, egg-shaped fuselage with a single tail-fin and tricycle undercarriage. Two seats were enclosed side-by-side behind an extensively glazed nose and the two three-blade rotors intermeshed with one another, canted from the vertical by 12.5 degrees. The fuselage construction was of steel-tube, skinned in sheet metal and fabric, and the rotor blades were built of plywood ribs and skin attached to steel tubes. The intermeshing rotors quickly earned it the nickname "eggbeater".

== Operational history ==
The first flight took place on 7 August 1944 with Kellett chief test pilot Dave Driskill at the controls. A lack of directional stability was discovered, and was corrected by the addition of two extra tail fins. A far more serious problem was discovered on 7 September, when it was found that a blade from each rotor had collided while the aircraft was in flight. The Air Force therefore ordered Kellett to design a new, rigid rotor system for the XR-8.

In the meantime, the two-bladed rotor system was trialled on the second prototype, beginning in March 1945. This proved immediately unworkable, with severe vibration that was prohibitively difficult to resolve. Similarly, it became apparent that the rigid rotor system was going to require extensive redesign of the aircraft, and this effort was dropped as well.

On 23 January 1946, the XR-8 was accepted for service trials with its original, non-rigid rotors in place. However, the program was canceled almost immediately, and the prototype was eventually handed over to the National Air and Space Museum. In 2022, it was transferred to the National Museum of the United States Air Force for restoration with a view to going on public display for the first time.

== Variants ==
- XR-8 — initial version with three-blade rotor system (1 built)
- XR-8A — version with two-blade rotor system (1 built)
- XR-8B — version with rigid rotor system (not built)

== Specifications (XR-8) ==
Data from Jane's all the World's Aircraft 1947

General characteristics

- Crew: 1
- Capacity: 1 passenger
- Length: 22 ft 7 in (6.88 m) fuselage
- Height: 11 ft 0 in (3.35 m)
- Empty weight: 2,320 lb (1,052 kg)
- Gross weight: 2,975 lb (1,349 kg)
- Fuel capacity: 34 US gal (28 imp gal; 130 L) normal; 81 US gal (67 imp gal; 310 L) maximum
- Powerplant: 1 × Franklin O-405-9 6-cyl. horizontally-opposed air-cooled piston engine, 245 hp (183 kW)
- Main rotor diameter: 2 × 36 ft 0 in (10.97 m)
- Main rotor area: 1,017.5 sq ft (94.53 m^{2}) each rotor

Performance

- Maximum speed: 100 mph (160 km/h, 87 kn)
- Service ceiling: 10,000 ft (3,000 m) *Hover ceiling: 3,000 ft (910 m)
- Disk loading: 35.2 lb/sq ft (172 kg/m^{2})
- Power/mass: 12.14 lb/hp (7.375 kg/kW)

== See also ==
Aircraft of comparable role, configuration, and era

- Flettner Fl 265
- Flettner Fl 282
- Sikorsky R-4
- Vought-Sikorsky VS-300
- Kaman HH-43 Huskie (This twin-intermeshing rotorcraft did enter service)

== Bibliography ==
- Allen, Francis (May–June 2004). "Ambitious 'Eggbeater': Kellet's XR-8 — Far Ahead of its Time". Air Enthusiast. No. 111. pp. 26–30. ISSN 0143-5450.
- Lambermont, Paul Marcel (1958). Helicopters and Autogyros of the World.
- Simpson, R. W. (1998). Airlife's Helicopters and Rotorcraft. Ramsbury: Airlife Publishing. p. 225.
- Taylor, Michael J. H. (1989). Jane's Encyclopedia of Aviation. London: Studio Editions. p. 558.
