= La Cellette =

La Cellette is the name of the following communes in France:

- La Cellette, Creuse, in the Creuse department
- La Cellette, Puy-de-Dôme, in the Puy-de-Dôme department
