= Avian Gyroplane =

2/180 Gyroplane
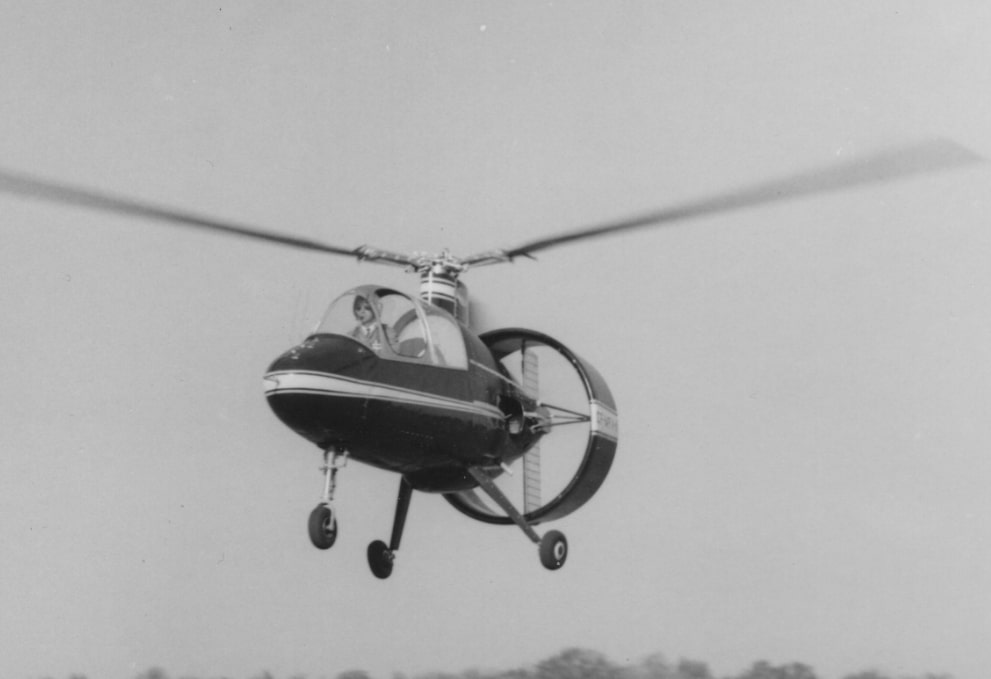

General information
- Type: Autogyro
- National origin: Canada
- Manufacturer: Avian Aircraft Ltd
- Number built: 6?

History
- First flight: 16 February 1961

The Avian 2/180 Gyroplane was a two-seat, single-engine autogyro built in Canada in the 1960s. Several prototypes were built but series production was never achieved.

== Design ==
The Avian Gyroplane was a two-seat autogyro without wings, with a ducted fan pusher propeller driven by a 200 hp (150 kW) Lycoming IO-360 piston engine. It had a three-bladed rotor, formed from bonded aluminium. There were flapping hinges but no drag hinges. In normal flight the rotor was undriven, but the design team were keen to enable vertical jump starts, an autogyro technique which spins up the rotor before take off without forward movement over the ground. The first prototype used conspicuous tip jets fed directly with compressed air from a fuselage-mounted cylinder.

The fuselage was built on a light alloy box beam which carried the cabin, engine mounting, rotor pylon and propeller duct. The well-glazed cabin seated two in tandem in front of the engine. Entry was via a starboard-side door; dual controls were fitted. Yaw was controlled with a rudder mounted within the propeller duct, enhancing its low-speed effectiveness. The Gyroplane had a fixed tricycle undercarriage. The main wheels were mounted on steel cantilever legs and the nosewheel castered.

== Development history ==
Avian Aircraft was started by Peter Payne and colleagues from the Avro Canada company specifically to build a modern autogyro.

The Gyroplane prototype first flew in Spring 1960. It was later lost in a crash. The compressed air jump start system was not a success, so the second prototype used the engine, connected via a belt, clutch and gear box. This aircraft was also made lighter than the first with more use of aluminium and fibreglass, increasing cruising speed by 25%. It was followed by three pre-production aircraft. By the end of 1963 more than 300 flying hours were completed. In December 1964 Avian received a $540,000 Canadian government contract to build a modified Gyroplane that would take the type to Certification. This was achieved late in 1968. Full FAA certification was achieved in the 1970s.

In 1970 Avian Ltd went into receivership. Although there were later hopes of a revival, nothing came of them. In 1972 some assets of Avian, including three Gyroplanes, were put up for sale, but no purchase is recorded. However, in 2002 one surviving Gyroplane and its certification rights were sold to Pegasus Rotorcraft Ltd, who renamed it the Pegasus III.

== Sale of Avian Aircraft to ARC Aerosystems ==
In 2023, ARC Aerosystems acquired the intellectual property, all rights and type certification of the Pegasus, including the one remaining flying example. On 13 November 2023, ARC Aerosystems announced that test flights of the Pegasus will begin in early 2024, at its facilities in Cranfield, with Chris Taylor as the designated test pilot.

=== ARC's plans for VTOL gyroplanes ===
ARC have published online plans for three aircraft designs using Pegasus technology. Of these three, only the Pegasus has had prototypes that are flying and approved for production:

- Pegasus VTOL Tech - a modern 2-seater gyroplane, a derivation of the Avian Gyroplane.
- Linx (sic) P3 - a 3-seater version of the Pegasis VTOL
- Linx P9 - a large gyroplane with wings that is proposed to carry 2 pilots and 9 passengers

In 2024, ARC announced that they had an order for five Pegasus VTOL, to be delivered in 2026.

Despite being a gyroplane (and not a true helicopter), ARC claims that their aircraft have full VTOL capability.

== Specifications (certification aircraft) ==
Data from Jane's All the World's Aircraft 1970-71

General characteristics

- Crew: 2
- Length: 16 ft 0 in (4.88 m)
- Height: 7 ft 4 in (2.24 m)
- Empty weight: 1,400 lb (635 kg)
- Max takeoff weight: 2,000 lb (907 kg)
- Powerplant: 1 × Lycoming IO-360 4-cylinder horizontally opposed, 200 hp (150 kW)
- Main rotor diameter: 37 ft (11 m)
- Main rotor area: 1,075 sq ft (99.9 m^{2})
- Propellers: 2-bladed Hartzell constant speed

Performance

- Maximum speed: 120 mph (190 km/h, 100 kn)
- Cruise speed: 105 mph (169 km/h, 91 kn)
- Service ceiling: 14,000 ft (4,300 m)
- Rate of climb: 870 ft/min (4.4 m/s) at sea level
