= Olympic Flight Museum =

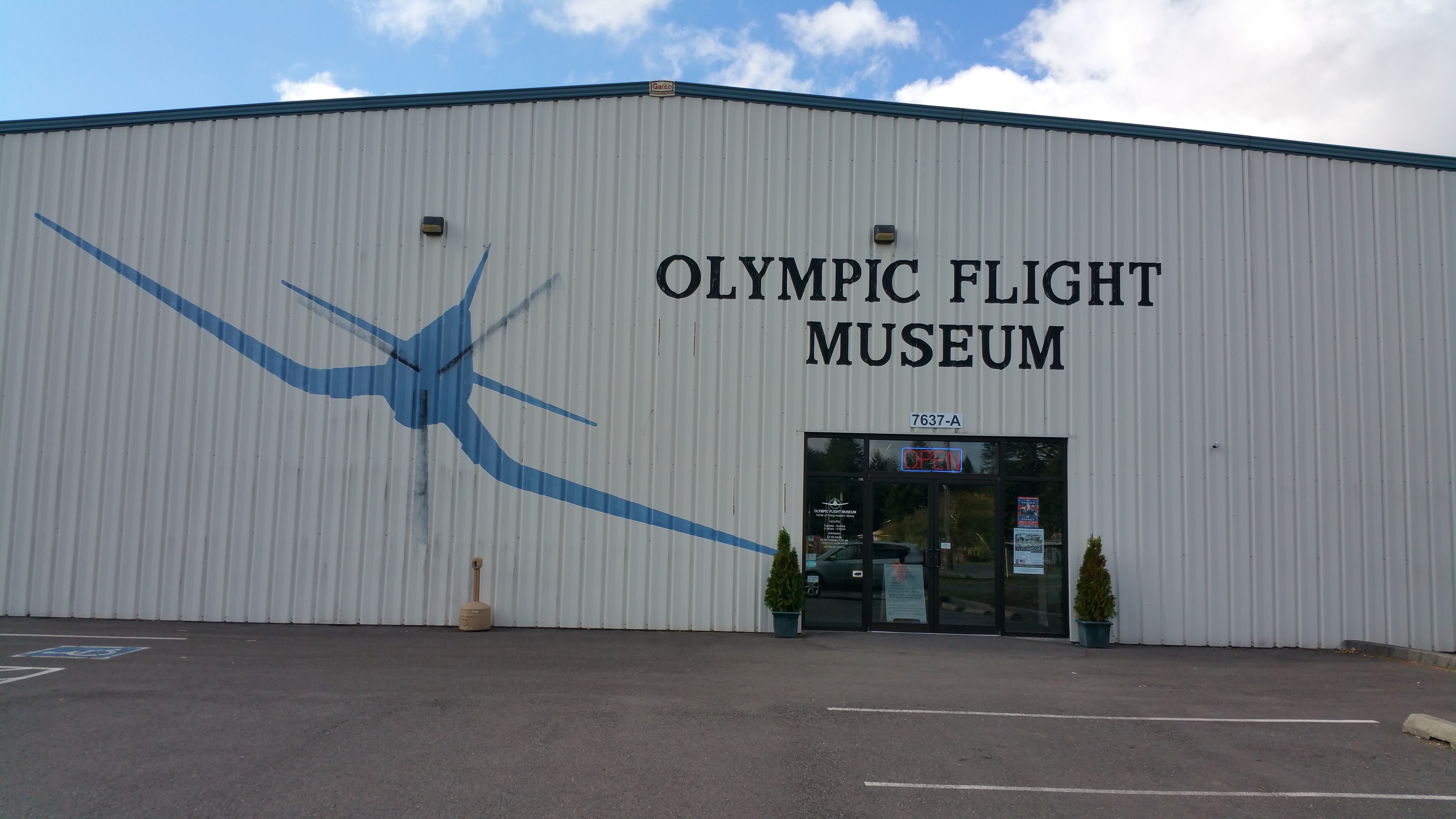
- Olympic Flight Museum
- Interactive map of Museum location
- Established: 1998
- Location: Olympia, Washington
- Coordinates: 46°58′33″N 122°53′52″W
- Type: Aviation museum
- Director: Teri Thorning
- President: Brian Reynolds
- Website: Olympic Flight Museum

The Olympic Flight Museum is an aviation museum at the Olympia Airport in Olympia, Washington, USA. The museum has more than 10 vintage planes and helicopters on display, most of which are in airworthy condition. The museum also hosts the annual Olympic Air Show in June, featuring a selection of heritage and current military aircraft demonstrations.

The museum is operated by a 501(c)(3) non-profit organization by the same name.

== History ==
The museum was founded in 1998. In 2003, the museum started hosting an annual airshow called the "Gathering of Warbirds".

== Aircraft on display ==
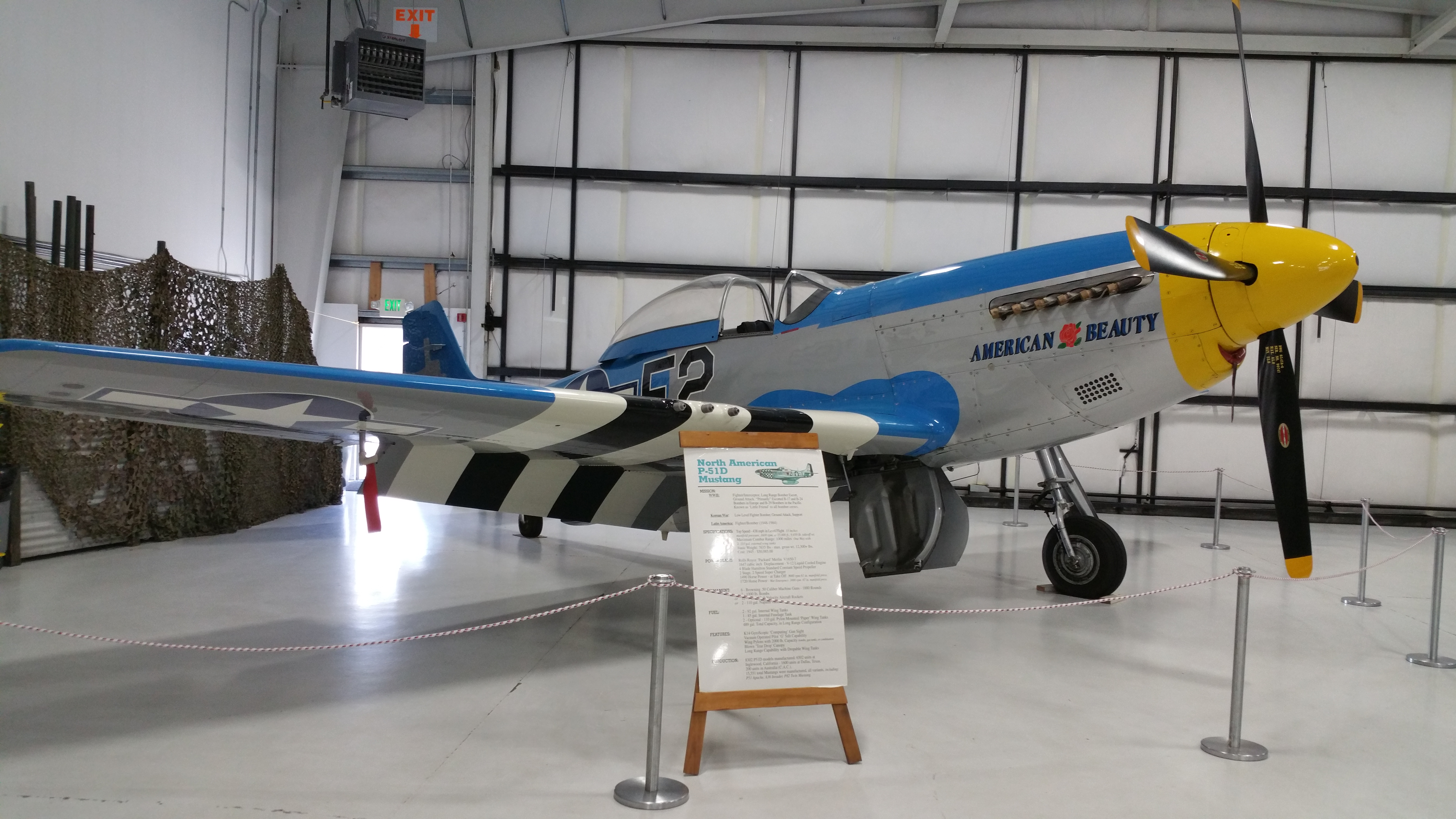
North American P-51 Mustang

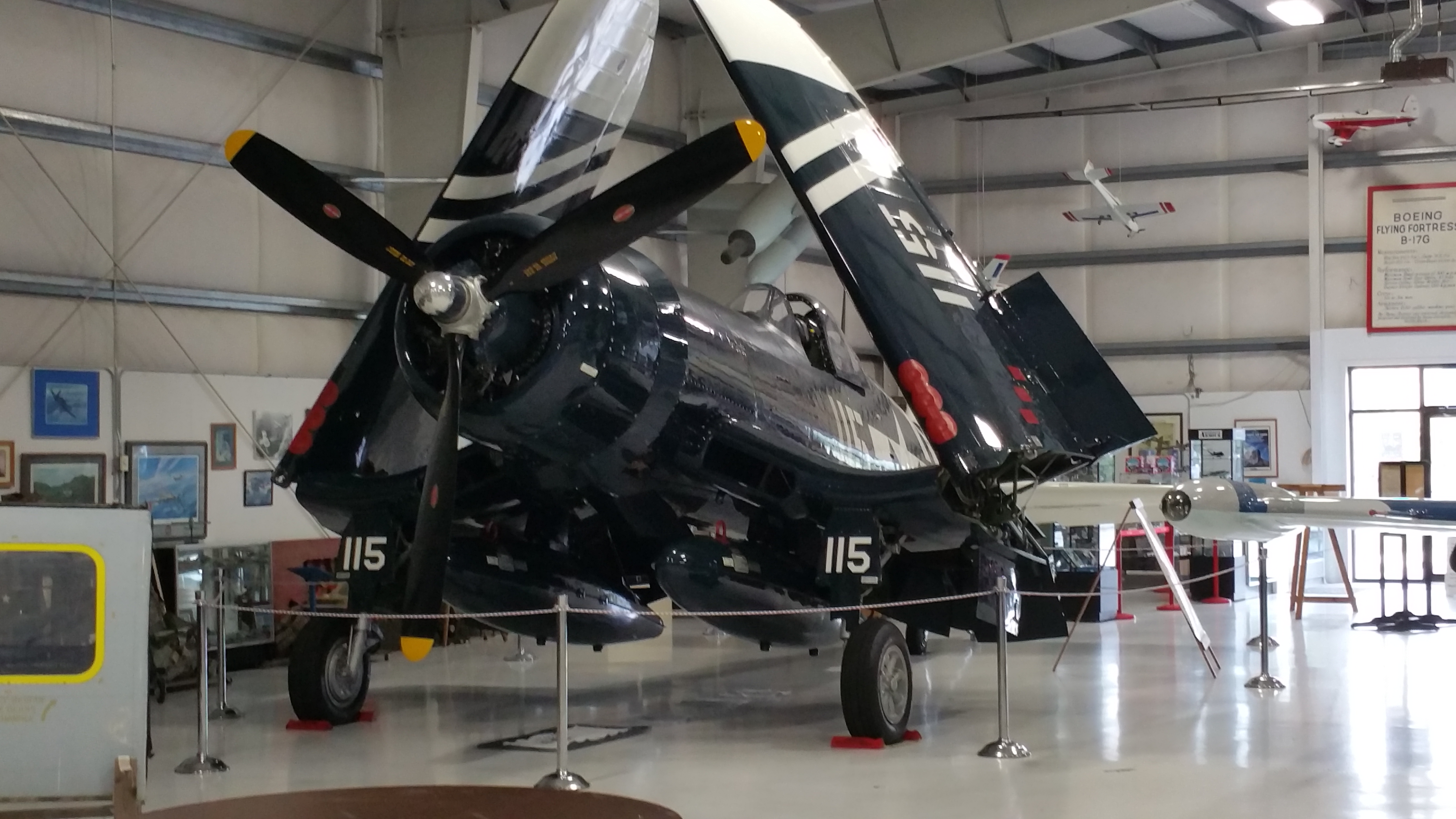
Goodyear FG-1D Corsair

As of 2019, the following aircraft are on display:

=== Fixed wing ===
- Aero L-29 Delfín
- Aero L-39ZO Albatros
- Boeing-Stearman PT-17 Kaydet
- English Electric Lightning
- Goodyear FG-1D Corsair
- Mitsubishi A6M Zero (replica)
- North American P-51D Mustang

=== Helicopters ===
- Bell AH-1 Cobra
- Bell HH-1K Iroquois
- Bell UH-1H Iroquois
- Hughes OH-6 Cayuse
- Kaman HH-43 Huskie
