= Kaman HH-43 Huskie =

Helicopter with intermeshing rotors in use by the US military from the 1950s to the 1970s

HH-43 Huskie
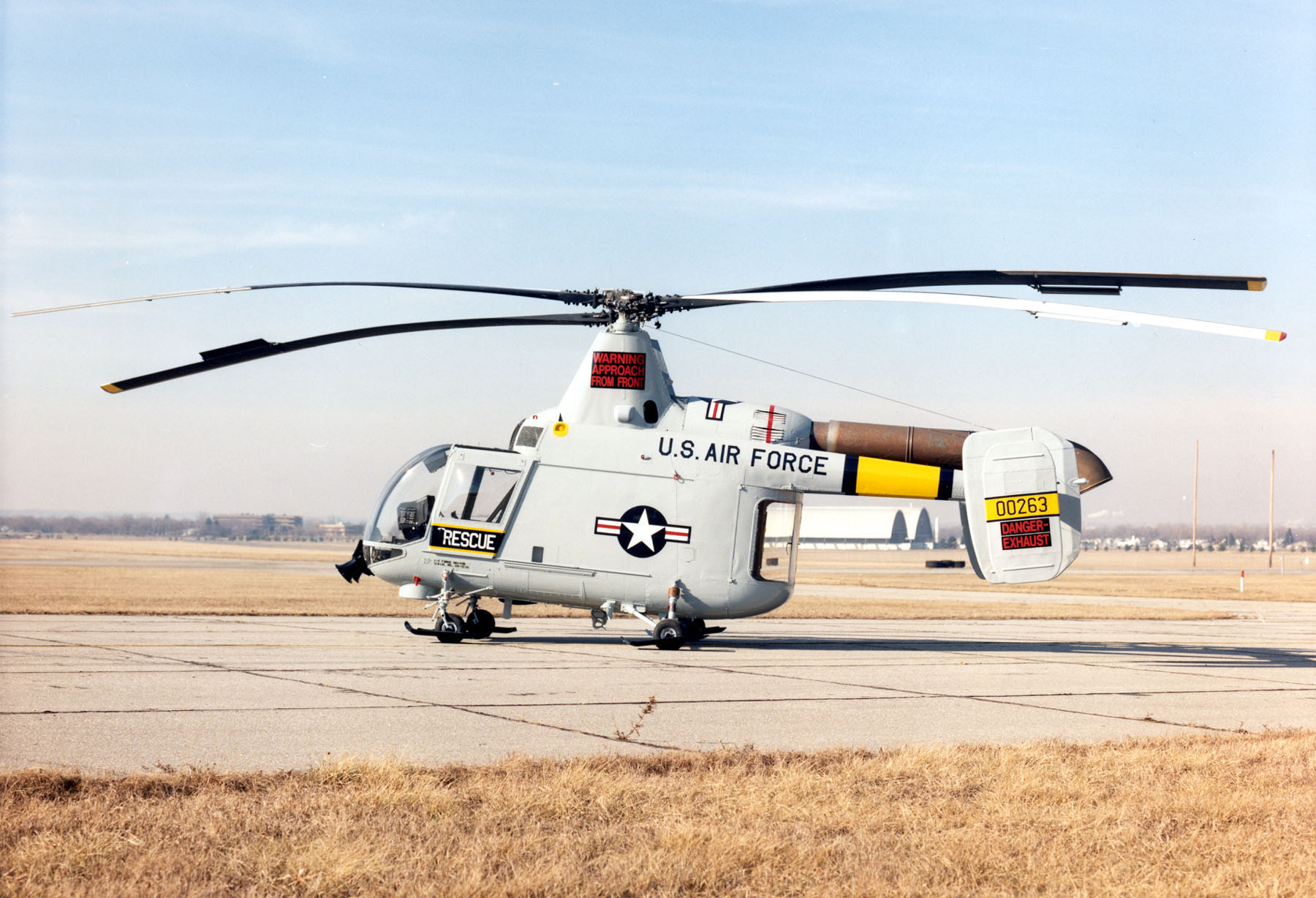
- HH-43B Huskie of the United States Air Force

General information
- Type: Firefighting/rescue
- Manufacturer: Kaman Aircraft
- Designer: Anton Flettner
- Status: Retired
- Primary users: United States Air Force United States Marine Corps; United States Navy
- Number built: 370

History
- Introduction date: November 1958
- First flight: 21 April 1953
- Retired: Early 1970s
- Developed into: Kaman K-1125

The Kaman HH-43 Huskie is a helicopter developed and produced by the American rotorcraft manufacturer Kaman Aircraft. It is perhaps most distinctive for its use of twin intermeshing rotors, having been largely designed by the German aeronautical engineer Anton Flettner.

First flown on 21 April 1953, the HH-43 went into production and was operated by several military air services, including the United States Air Force, the United States Navy and the United States Marine Corps. It was primarily intended for use in aircraft firefighting and rescue in the close vicinity of air bases, but was extensively deployed during the Vietnam War. It was used as a search and rescue platform, having often been enhanced with makeshift modification and new apparatus to better suit the tropical conditions. The HH-43 was also exported to several other countries and sold commercially. It set several aviation records in its class, and was the first helicopter to experiment with twin-turbine engines. The early models used a flat six or Wasp radial piston engine, and then this was changed to single gas turbine engine. The early piston powered models had three fins on a twin tail, but the turbine model had 4 vertical tail fins on two tail booms and an engine exhaust tube. By the 1970s, it was being replaced by newer rotorcraft that were typically bigger and capable of greater performance. Many of the helicopters made their way to the civilian market and museums.

Under the aircraft designation system used by the U.S. Navy pre-1962, Navy and U.S. Marine Corps versions were originally designated as the HTK, HOK or HUK, for their use as training, observation or utility aircraft, respectively. The Air Force Version was the H-43A, however after 1962 the designation system was consolidated, and that became the HH-43A, and the H-43B, the HH-43B. HUK-1 became UH-43C, HOK-1 became OH-43D, and HTK-1 became TH-43E. The TH-43E was a training version used by the Navy, powered by flat six piston engine, with space for three people; this version had 3 vertical tail fins on the end of single, not twin tail boom.

== Development ==
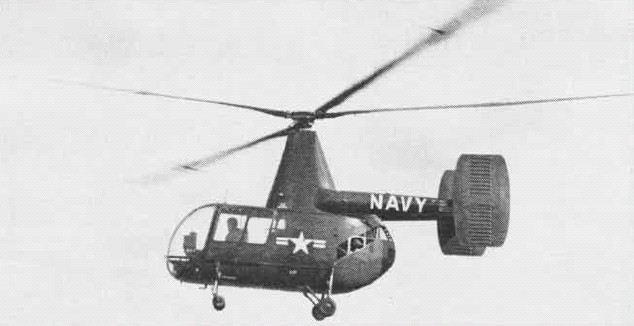
HOK-1 prototype, 1953

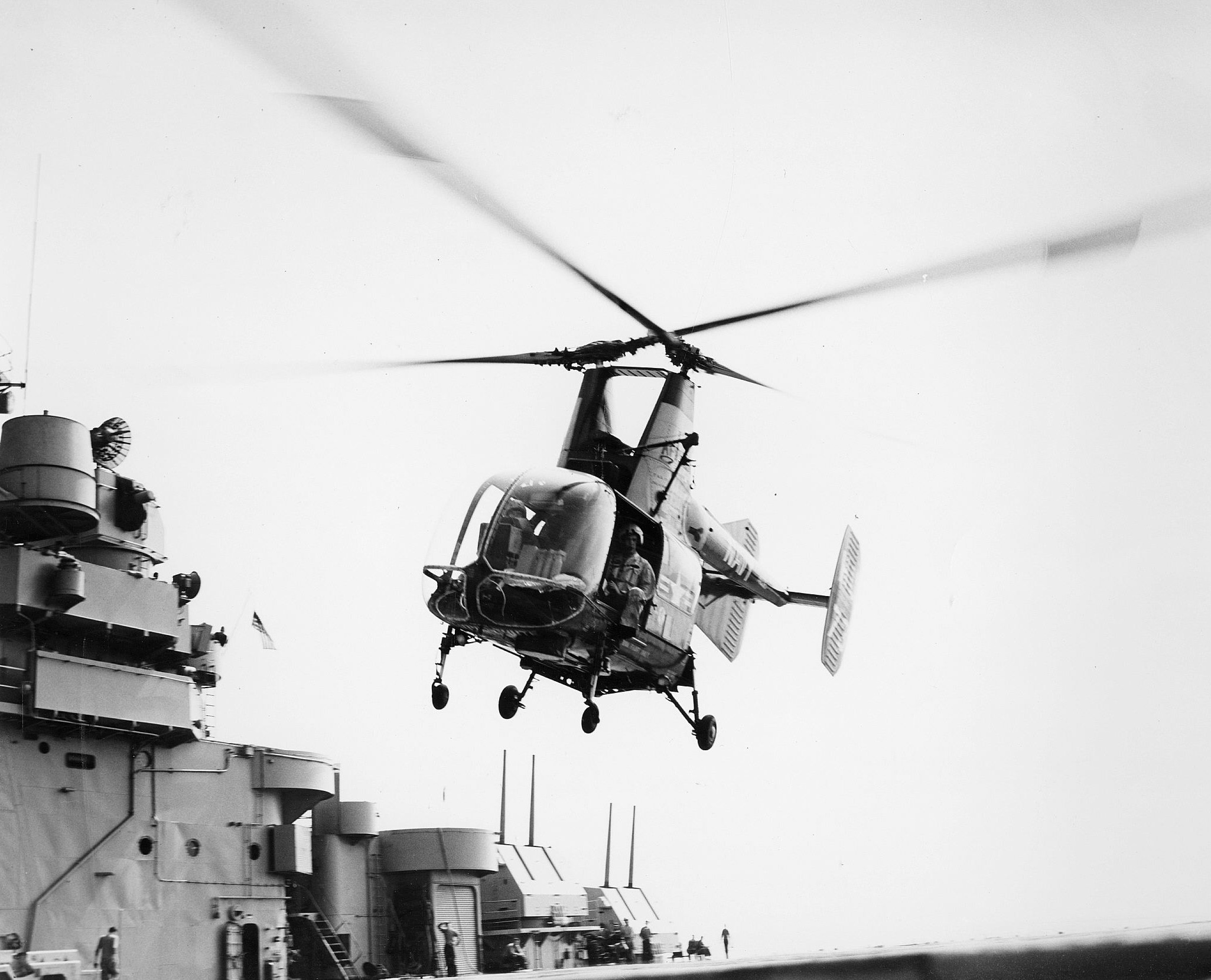
HUK-1 (later renamed UH-43C) on sea trials in 1959.

In 1947, the German aeronautical engineer Anton Flettner was brought to the United States as part of Operation Paperclip. He was the developer of the two earlier synchropter designs from Germany during the Second World War: the Flettner Fl 265 which pioneered the synchropter layout, and the slightly later Flettner Fl 282 Kolibri ("Hummingbird"), intended for eventual production. Both designs used the principle of counter-rotating side-by-side intermeshing rotors, as the means to solve the problem of torque compensation, normally countered in single–rotor helicopters by a tail rotor, fenestron, NOTAR, or vented blower exhaust. Flettner remained in the United States and became the chief designer of the Kaman company. In this capacity, he designed numerous new helicopters that used the Flettner double rotor.

On 21 April 1953, the first prototype, referred to by the manufacturer as the K-225, made its maiden flight. It was later adopted by the United States Navy as the HTK-1, by which point it was outfitted with a single Lycoming O-435 flat-six piston engine, producing 240 hp (180 kW). During 1954, for an experiment jointly conducted by Kaman and the U.S. Navy, a single HTK-1 was modified and flown with its piston engine having been replaced by a pair of Boeing T50-BO-2 turbine engines totaling 380 hp (280 kW), becoming the world's first twin-turbine helicopter in the process.

Subsequently, a much more powerful Pratt & Whitney R-1340 Wasp radial piston engine, capable of producing 600 hp (450 kW), powered the far heavier HOK-1, HUK-1, and H-43A versions for the United States Marines, U.S. Navy, and the United States Air Force, respectively. The USAF also opted to procure two models that were powered by a single Lycoming T53 turboshaft engine: the HH-43B with 860 hp (640 kW) and the HH-43F with 825 hp (615 kW). The HH-43B variant established several world records for helicopters in its class during the early 1960s, including for rate of climb, altitude, and distance traveled. The Huskie had a variety of tail and fin combinations over different variants, such a single tail with two or three fins or twin tail booms with four vertical fins.

== Design ==
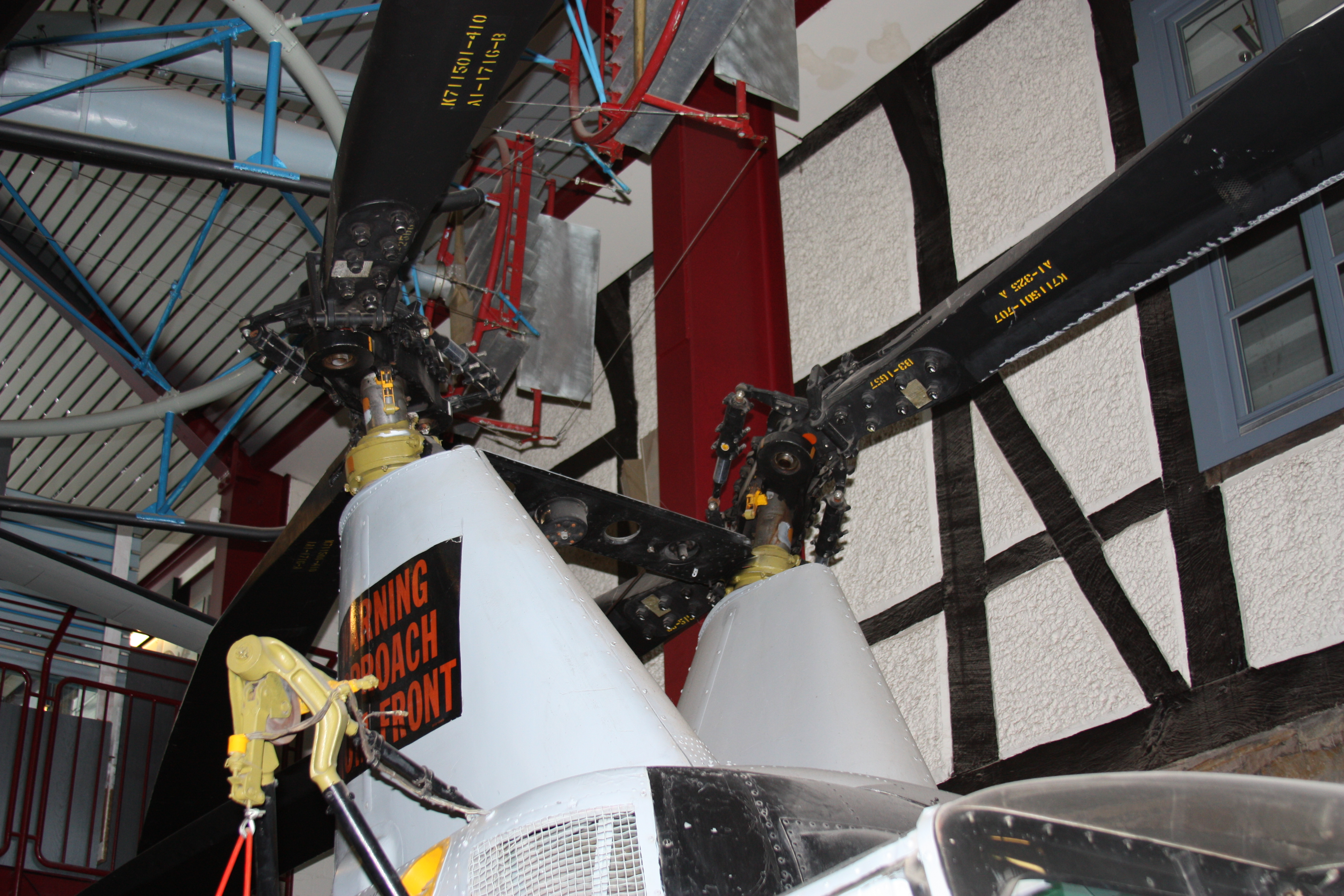
The twin intermeshed rotors of this design

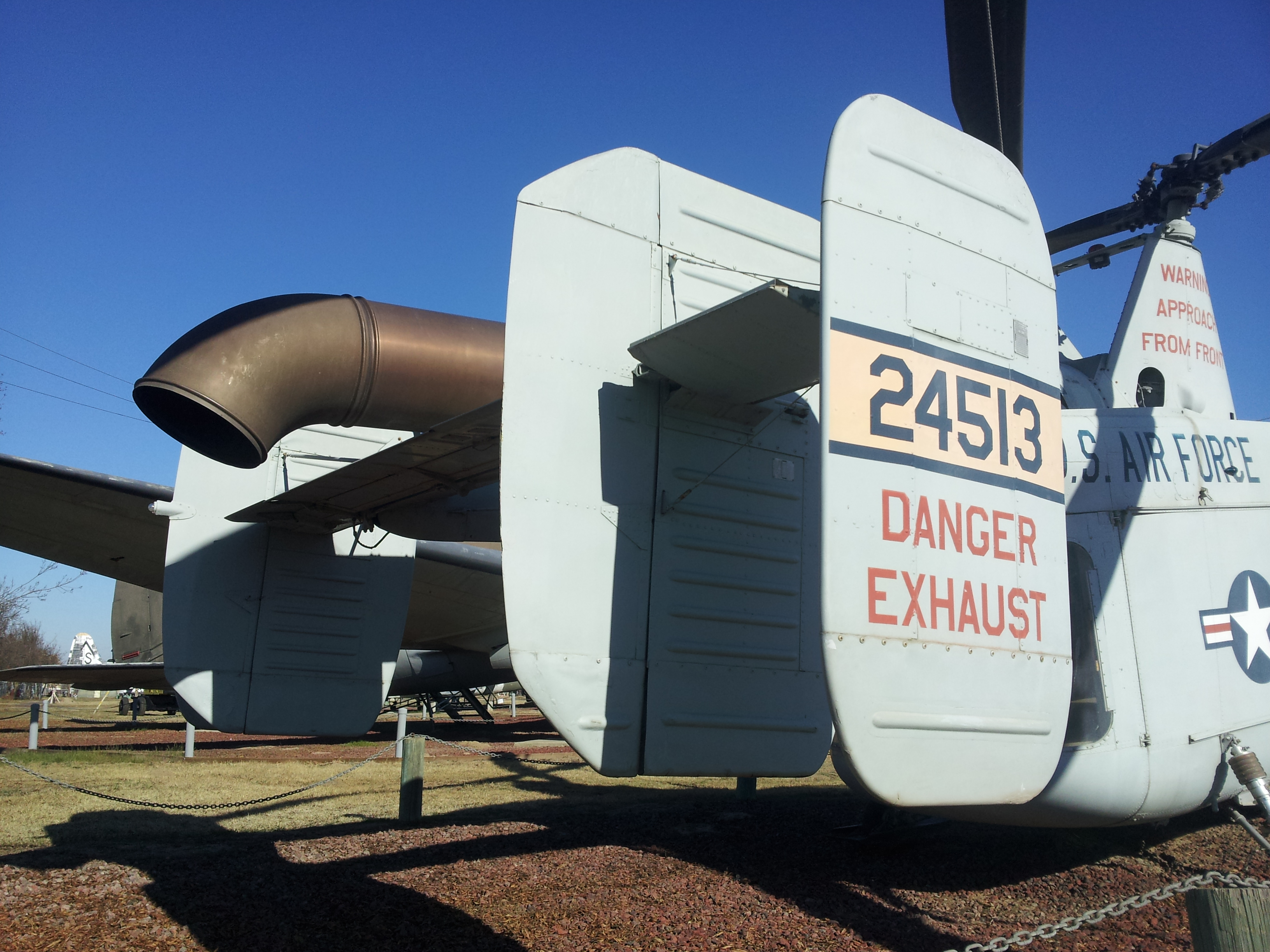
The prominent exhaust tube the turbine powered version

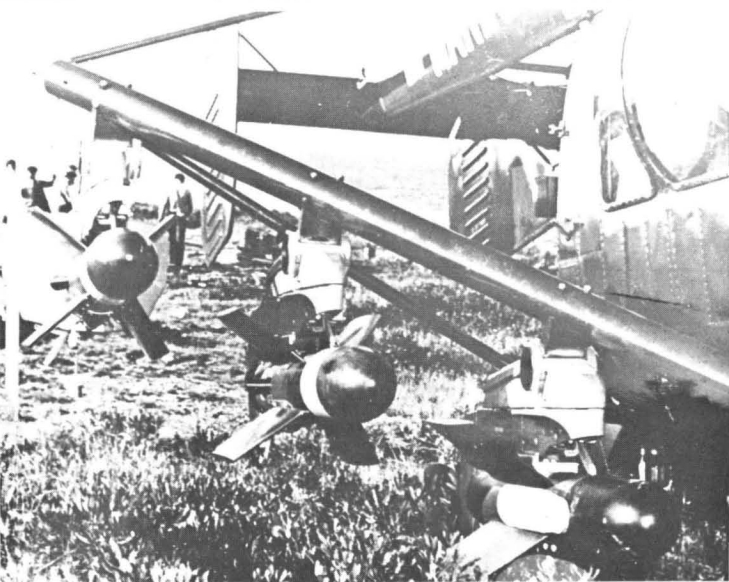
HOK-1 with SS-11 (M22) missiles

The design had two main rotors, each with two blades. The blades were made primarily of wood, and the two main rotors were linked by a transmission to keep them synced correctly. The design used a variety of engines including a flat-six, radial, and gas turbine. It was also tested with twin turbine engines. The rear of the aircraft had three main configurations: three vertical fins on the end of single tail boom, three vertical fins on the end of twin tail booms, and finally four vertical fins on the end of twin tail booms along with an engine exhaust. The design usually had four wheels to land on, but some had combined wheels and skis, and there was also a version with twin floats.

Flight control on the HH-43 was primarily effected by a series of servo-flaps, or large tabs, that was located on the trailing edge of each rotor blade; the actuation of these flaps would cause the rotors to warp and thus cause the helicopter to either rise or descend as desired. The rotor blades were composed of laminated wood; these restricted the aircraft's use in heavy rains as it could cause blade delamination. There was no conventional tail rotor; its absence gave the rotorcraft a somewhat unusual look. The contra-rotating twin rotors posed a particular hazard on the ground; crews were instructed to avoid approaching or departing the vehicle from the sides, but to instead advance or leave the vehicle from the front, as the blades would be at their highest at this position. Warnings that reinforced this instruction were usually painted on the sides of the pylons which supported the rotor heads.

The B model had four vertical stabilizers at end of twin tail booms at the rear, but no tail rotor, as the two counter rotating main rotors balanced each other out. It had combination wheel and skids that aided in landing on soft ground.

The interior of the T53 turbine powered HH-43 was divided in two somewhat cramped compartments, the cockpit at the front and an aft crew compartment, which were connected by a small opening that was too narrow for most personnel to pass through (the original radial piston powered versions lacked the aft compartment). Dependent on the mission being performed, the aft compartment would be used to house firefighters, medics, mechanics, and/or rescued personnel; folding sidewall-mounted seats were provided for up to four personnel in this space, while the cockpit normally housed the pilot and co-pilot alone. In a typical configuration, a pair of clamshell doors would be fitted that could open up into the aft area of the rear compartment; in tropical conditions, these doors would often be removed to help cool the interior; in such a configuration, an aft net would be installed to prevent any personnel from falling out of the aircraft. No weapons mounts were officially approved, but some improvised arrangements did see the use of a Browning Automatic Rifle at the aft ramp position.

On the exterior of the rotorcraft, a motorised hoist that was typically used for rescue missions was commonly fitted; control of the hoist was normally exercised from within the aft compartment, but the pilot could also directly control the hoist via the cyclic stick. For rescues at sea, a padded sling, nicknamed the 'horse collar', was fitted to the end of the hoist to aid in retrieval operations. Due to unsatisfactory performance in the field, other devices were usually fitted, including the wire basket "Stokes litter" and a heavy "forest penetrator". Also called a "Jungle penetrator", it had spring loaded arms and a seat, that could be ridden up or down from the helicopter with the hoist. A PJ could ride down and could help retrieve a downed airmen, and the rescue version had stretcher and medical kit inside. The jungle penetrator had fold-out seats for up to three people.

== Operational history ==
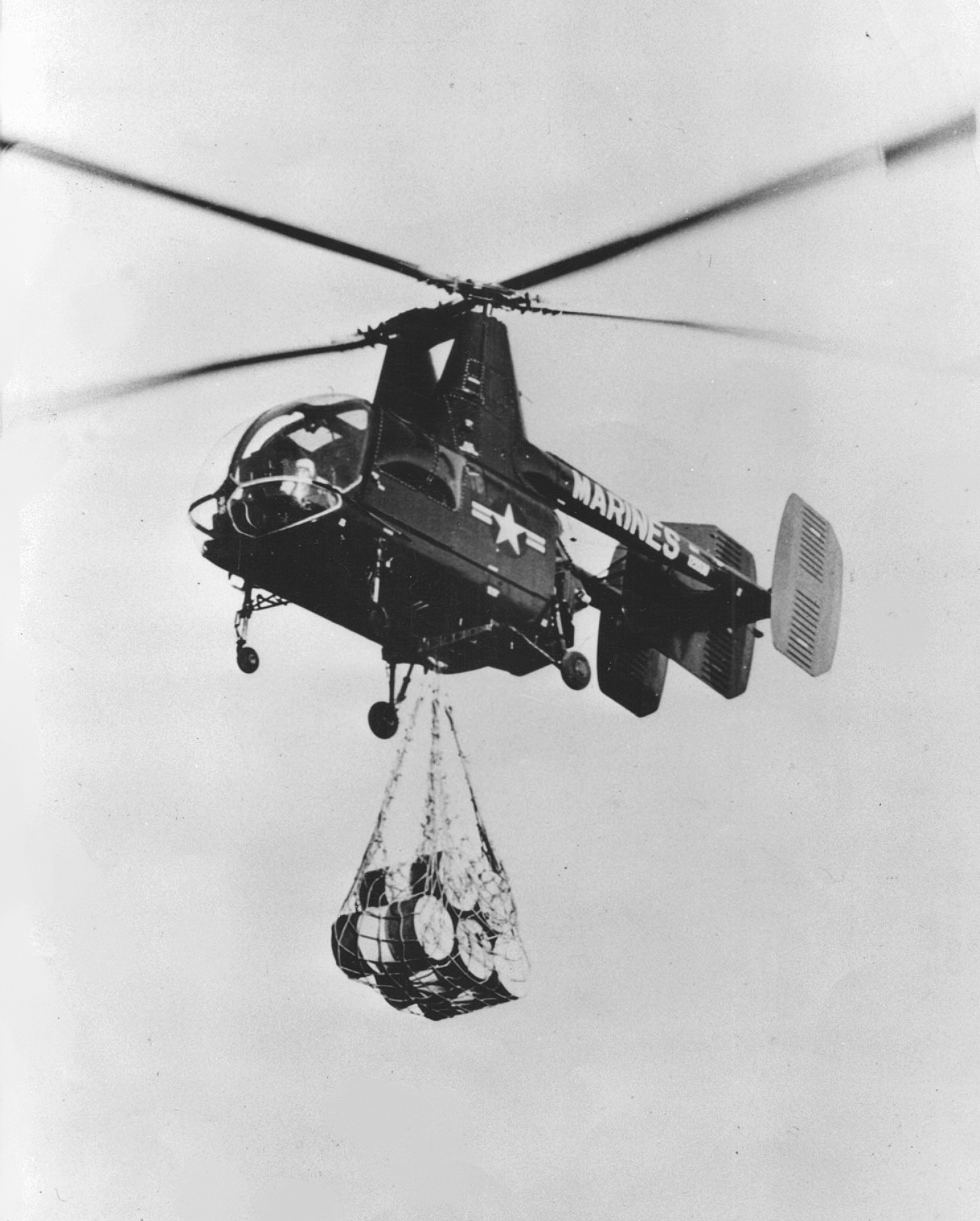
USMC HOK-1 (later renamed OH-43D) carries drums, 1956

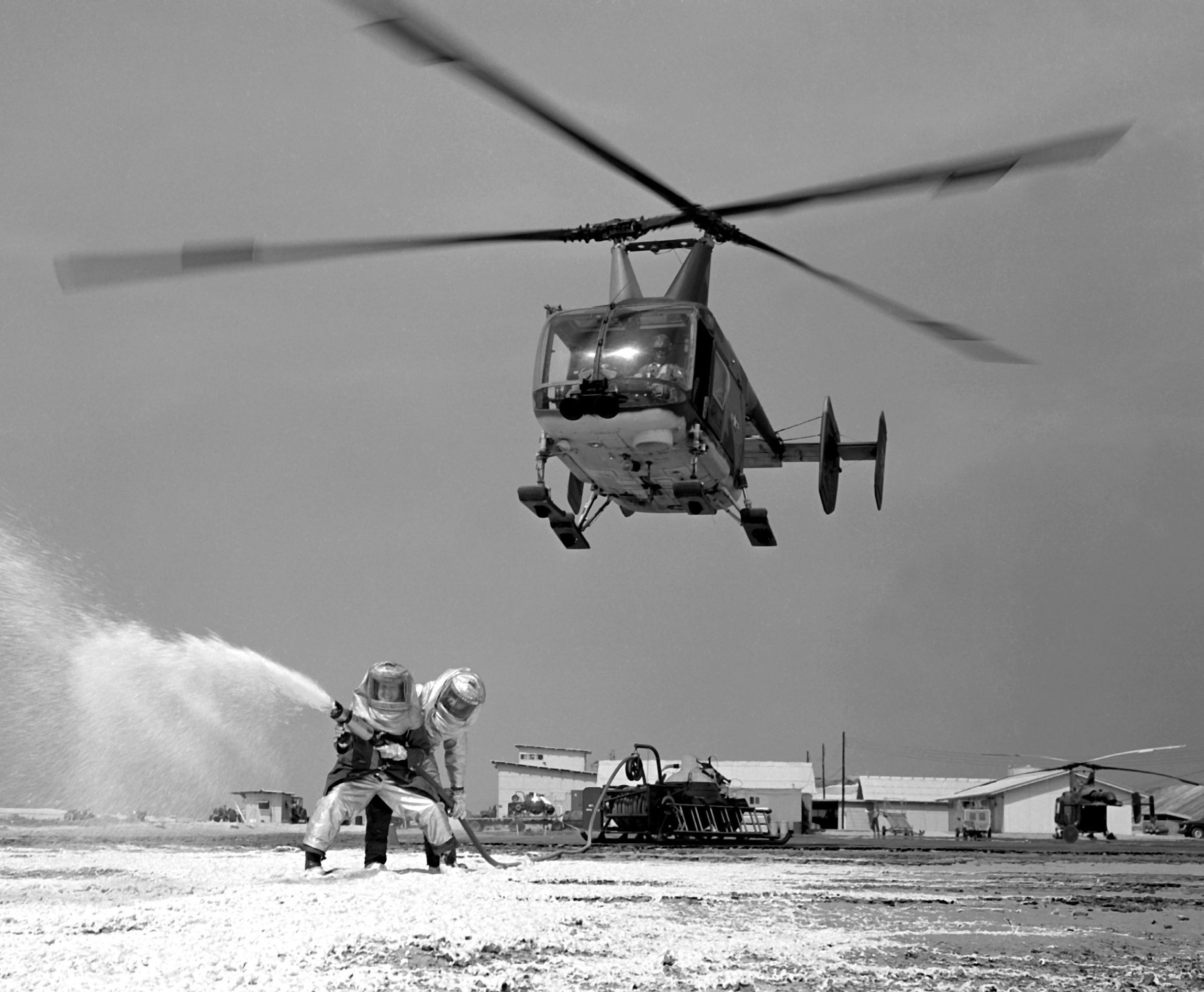
A USAF Huskie aids a practice firefighting operation at Cam Ranh Bay Air Base, Vietnam in 1968

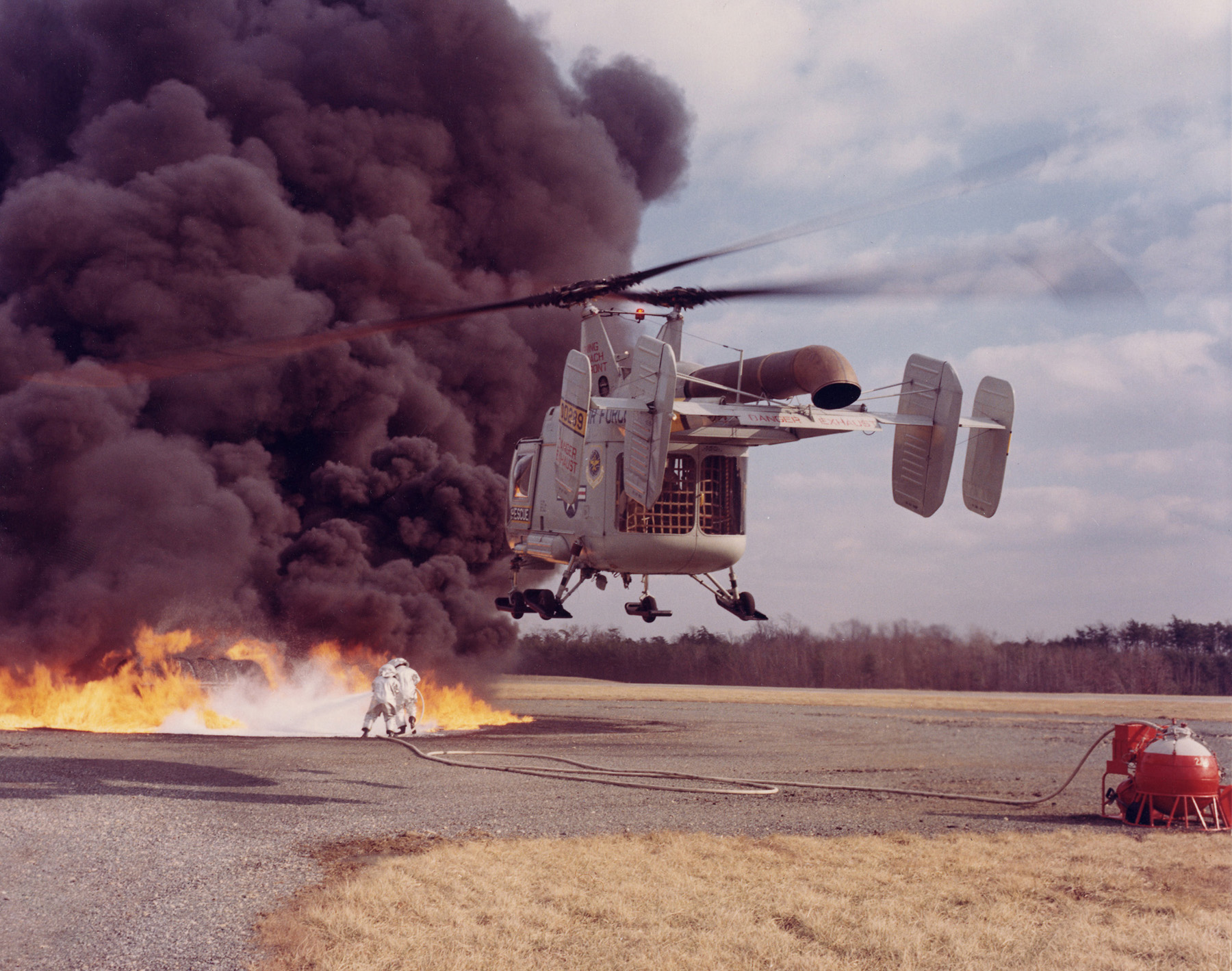
HH-43B on a firefighting exercise in the 1960s. The helicopter had an especially strong downwash that could blow the smoke away from the firefighters

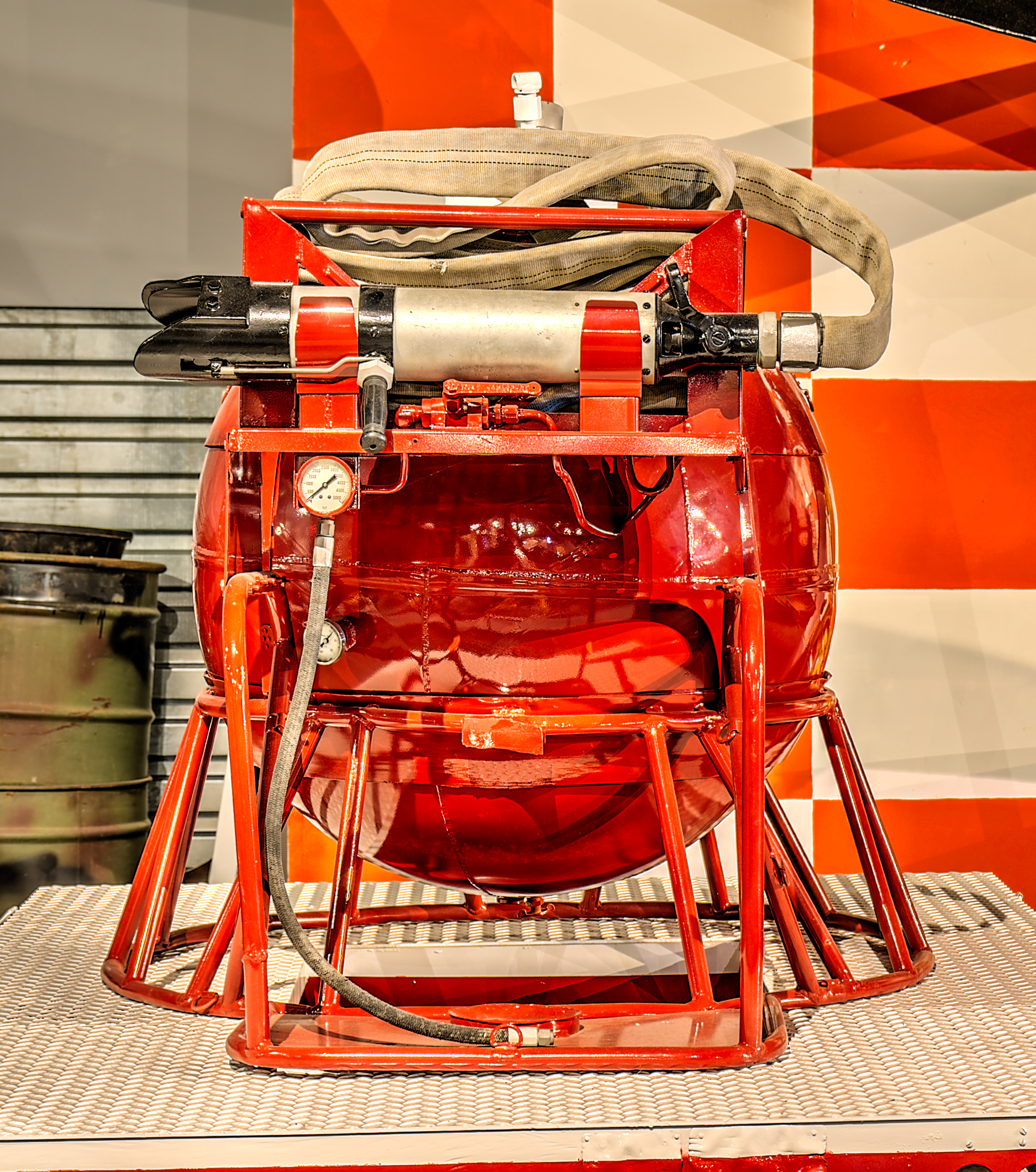
Fire suppression kit on display at the Museum of Aviation

The Huskie entered service in late 1958 with the United States Air Force. It was also adopted by the United States Navy and United States Marine Corps, but not the United States Army. It was used extensively in the Vietnam war, and was an important Search and rescue helicopter. It was also used to fight fires and for utility operations. The early radial engine-powered models gave way to turbine-powered ones. It was also sold on the civilian market, and at least one warbird models are in flying condition in the 21st century.

The HH-43 Huskie was procured by the USAF; the first H-43As were delivered to the service in November 1958 while the first H-43Bs were accepted in June 1959. The USAF primarily procured the type to perform local base rescue operations and to fight aircraft fires. For the latter capacity, the H-43 was commonly outfitted with an airborne fire suppression kit that hung beneath it; this kit, which was developed at Wright-Patterson AFB, weighed only 1,000 pounds yet could output almost 700 gallons of fire-fighting foam. Huskies were usually capable of reaching crash sites before ground vehicles could, saving often-critical time in the rescue. The helicopter had an especially strong down-wash that was useful in fighting fires. During 1962, the USAF opted to change the H-43 designation to HH-43 to reflect the rotorcraft's role as a rescue vehicle. The HH-43F was the last model delivered to the USAF, these differed from earlier models primarily by engine and rotor modifications that produced greater lift.

The Huskie was deployed overseas during the Vietnam War; several detachments of the Pacific Air Rescue Center, the 33d, 36th, 37th, and 38th Air Rescue Squadrons, and the 40th Aerospace Rescue and Recovery Squadron operated the type. Personnel came to commonly refer to the aircraft by its call sign "Pedro". Early on, the rotorcraft's limited range proved to be a hindrance to operations; some crews resorted to an improvised additional fuel tank housed within the aft compartment, increasing fuel capacity by roughly 75 percent. A Huskie performed the first combat medevac in March 1965, for an airmen downed in the Vietnamese Demilitarized Zone during Operation Rolling Thunder. At the time the Huskies were the only rescue helicopters in service, other types, such as the Jolly Green Giant arrived later.

During the conflict, the HH-43 flew more rescue missions than all other rotorcraft combined, largely due to its unique hovering capability; between 1966 and 1970, the type performed a total of 888 combat rescue, comprising 343 aircrew rescues and 545 non-aircrew rescues. The type was also occasionally used as a firefighting vehicle in the theatre as well. Noting the shortcomings of the HH-43, the procurement of newer aircraft, such as the Sikorsky CH-3C and HH-3E, was accelerated; their arrival in quantity supplanted the type and saw its being entirely replaced during the early 1970s. However, the HH-43 did continue to serve in Southeast Asia until 1975, making it both the first and last rescue helicopter serving in that theatre. (See also List of aircraft losses of the Vietnam War)

Pakistan procured three HH-43Bs in 1964 for Search and rescue and general support missions in its hot and multi-terrain environment. It equipped her airforce's No. 4 Squadron. During the 1965 Indo-Pakistani War, the Huskies were employed in logistic support missions for the Army, transporting artillery pieces and 31,000 lb (14,000 kg) of ammunition to inaccessible battlefields in the mountains of Kashmir. On 8 July 1976, an H-43B from PAF Base Masroor was scrambled for a rescue mission in the Arabian Sea after receiving an SOS call from an Egyptian merchant ship "Latakia". All of the ship's crew were winched up safely before the ship sank.

Iran received 20 HH-43Fs from 1965, with 17 going to the Imperial Iranian Army Aviation and the remaining three joining the Imperial Iranian Air Force. The Iranian Army used its Huskies as utility helicopters, while the Iranian Air Force's helicopters were used for search and rescue duties. The army's Huskies were later transferred to the air force, where they remained in use until being replaced by Bell 214 helicopters in 1978. After the outbreak of the Iran-Iraq War in 1980, four HH-43s were reactivated by the Islamic Republic of Iran Air Force for use as air ambulances. They were used to transport casualties that had been airlifted to Tehran by Hercules transport aircraft to hospitals about Tehran for treatment. The four Huskies continued in use from 1983 to 1985, when they were retired following a fatal crash.

Many retired Huskies were used in the logging industry until spares were difficult to get, then the price dropped and they were harder to keep in operation. A HH-43 operating in the logging industry had a crash in 2006, with a failure of main gear box due to cracks. The FAA said the helicopter gearbox had likely developed cracks from carrying heavy loads of logs.

There is one known flying and restored Huskie by the 2020s, which is sometimes flown at the Olympia Air show. There are not many spare parts available for the Huskie by this time, in particular the rotor blades.

== Variants ==
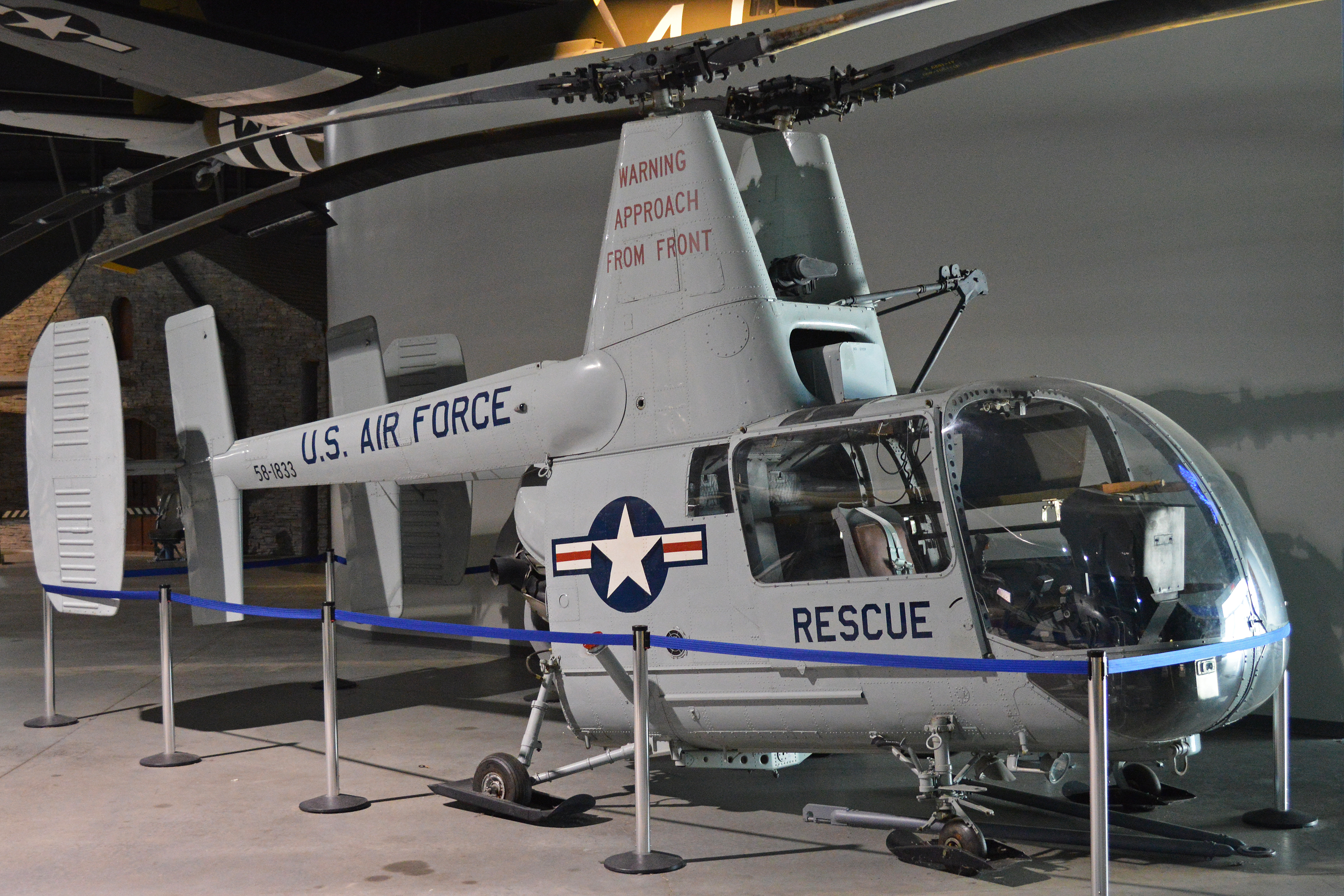
HH-43A

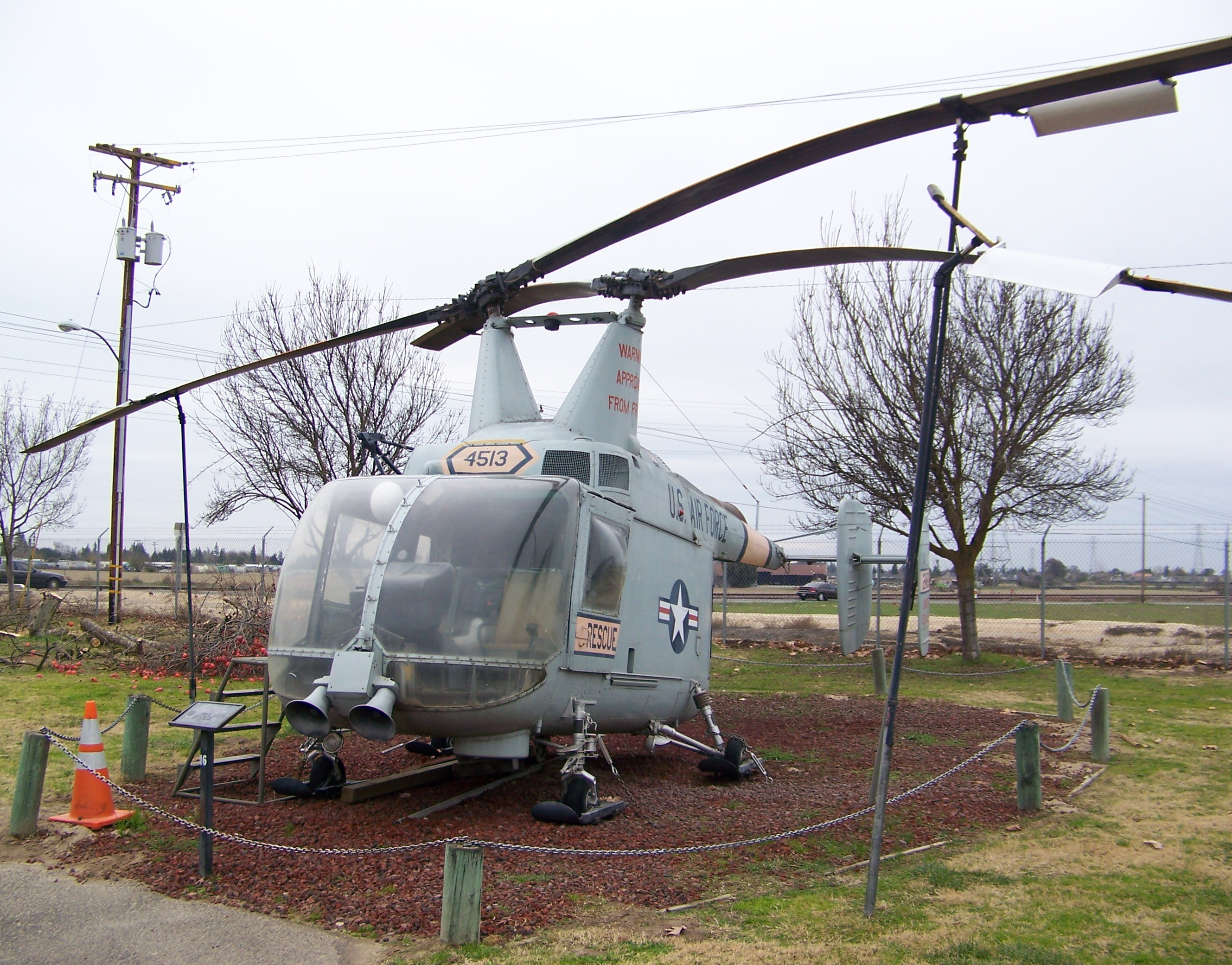
HH-43B Huskie in museum

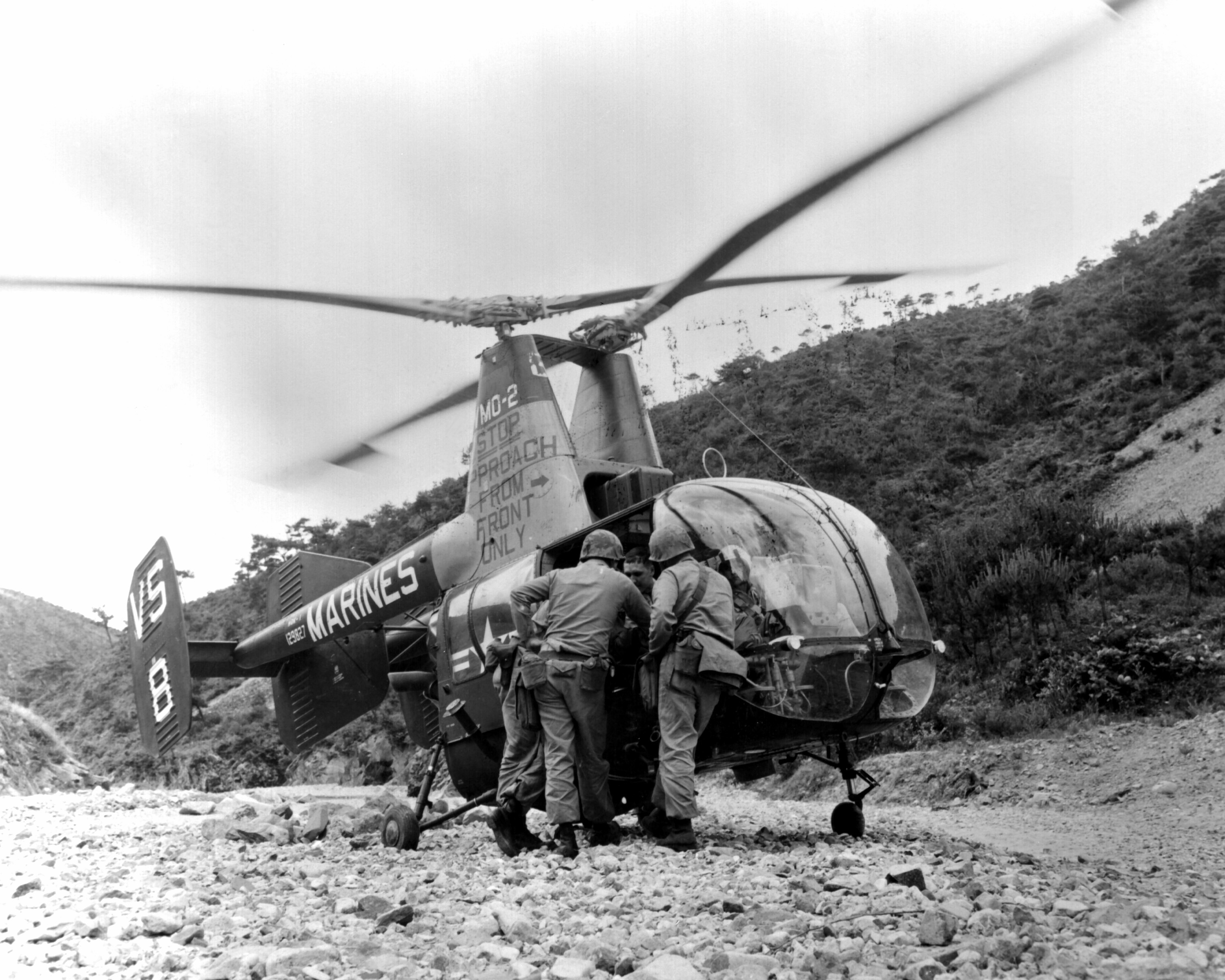
OH-43D Huskie in 1960

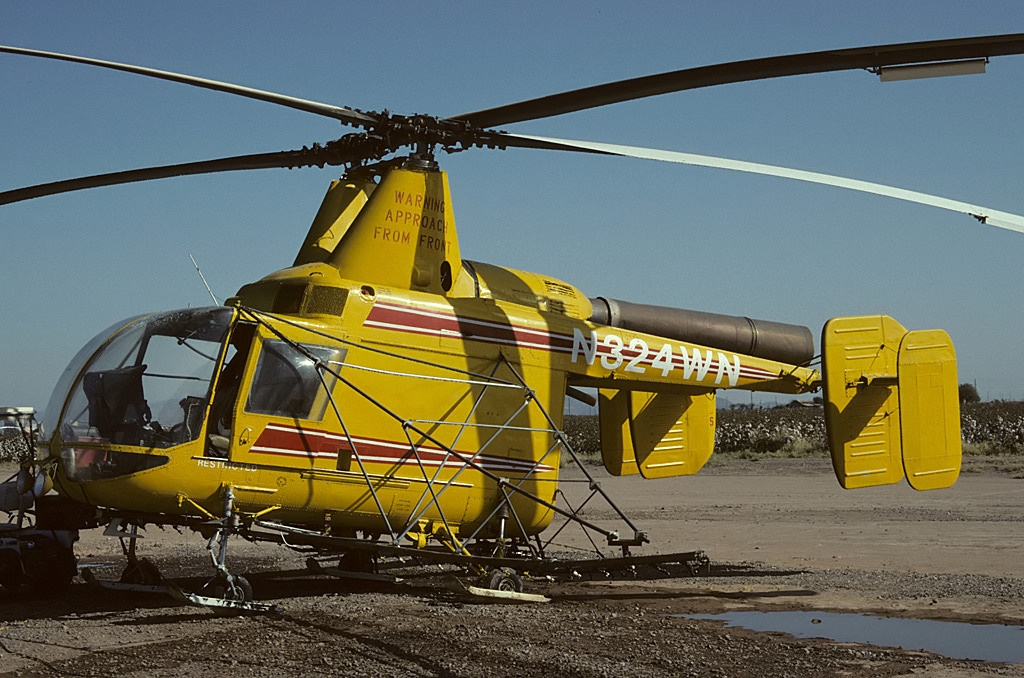
HH-43F (K-600)

An HTK was tested with twin Boeing 502 turboshafts in 1954, this was the first twin-turbine helicopter.

K-240
company designation from HTK-1/TH-43E
K-600
proposed civilian counterpart of HOK-1
K-600-3
civilian counterpart of H-43B
K-600-4
company designation of HOK-3 development
K-600-5
HH-43F
XHTK-1
two two-seat aircraft for evaluation
HTK-1
three-seat production version powered by a 240 hp (180 kW) Lycoming O-435-4 flat-six piston engine for the United States Navy, later became TH-43E, 29 built
XHTK-1G
one example for evaluation by the United States Coast Guard
HTK-1K
one example for static tests as a drone
XHOK-1
prototype of United States Marine Corps version, two built
HOK-1
United States Marine Corps version powered by a 600 hp (450 kW) R-1340-48 Wasp radial piston engine; later became OH-43D, 81 built
HOK-3
proposed development powered by a Blackburn-Turbomeca Twin Turmo 600 turboshaft powerplant.
HUK-1
United States Navy version of the HOK-1 with R-1340-52 radial piston engine; later became UH-43C, 24 built
H-43A
USAF version of the HOK-1; later became the HH-43A, 18 built
HH-43A
post-1962 designation of the H-43A
H-43B
H-43A powered by an 860 shp (640 kW) Lycoming T53-L-1B turboshaft engine, three-seats and full rescue equipment; later became HH-43B, 200-built
HH-43B
post-1962 designation of the H-43B
UH-43C
post-1962 designation of the HUK-1
OH-43D
post-1962 designation of the HOK-1
TH-43E
post-1962 designation of the HTK-1
HH-43F
HH-43B powered by an 825 shp (615 kW) Lycoming T53-L-11A turboshaft engine with reduced diameter rotors, 42 built and conversions from HH-43B
QH-43G
One OH-43D converted to drone configuration
H.5
(Thai: ฮ.๕) Royal Thai Armed Forces designation for the HH-43B.

== Operators ==
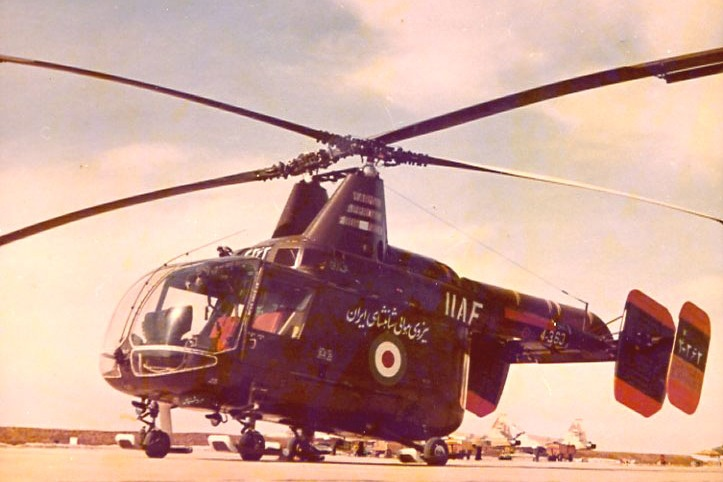
One of 12 HH-43 Huskies acquired by the Imperial Iranian Air Force in 1965

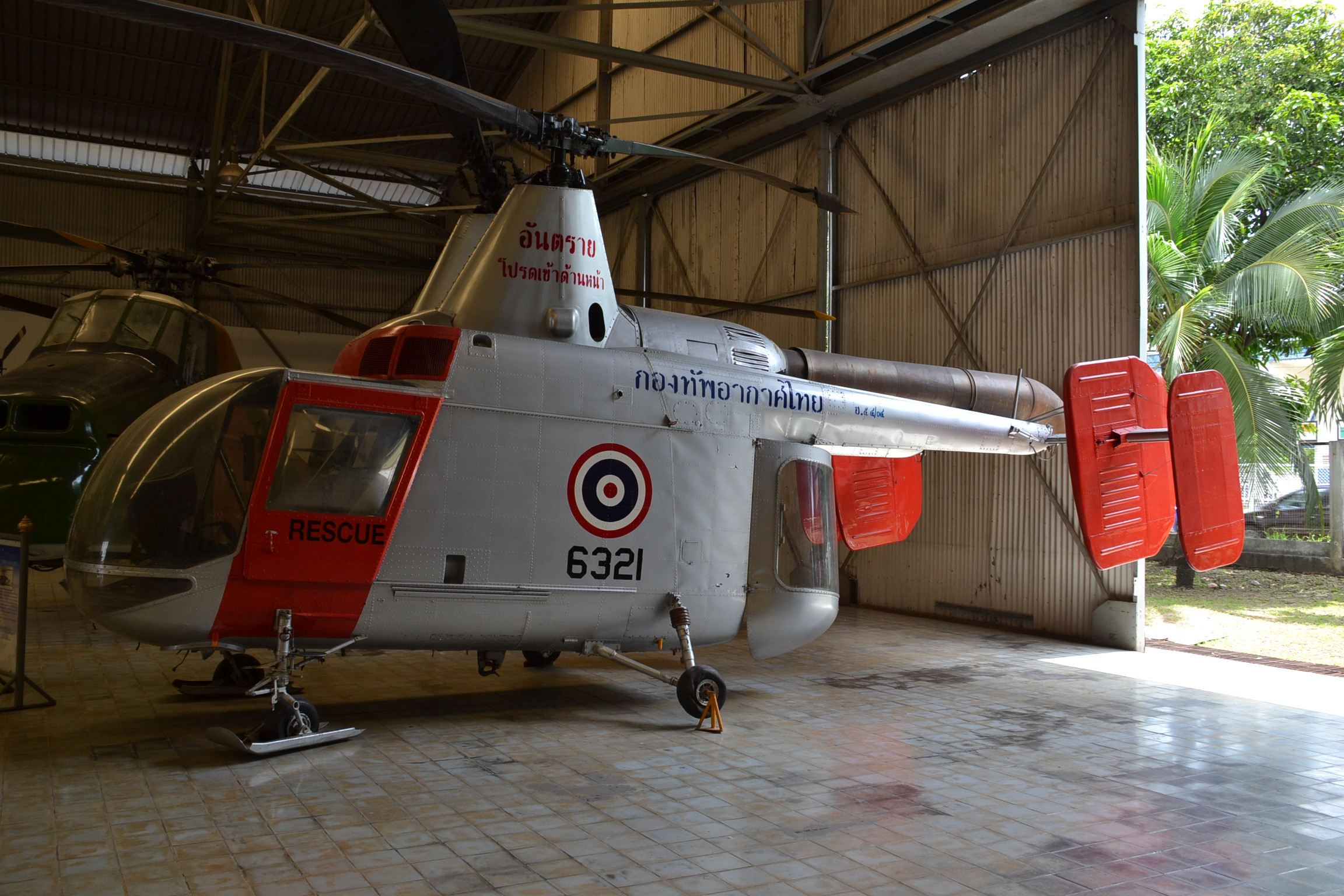
A Thai Kaman HH.34B at the Royal Thai Air Force Museum (2014)

Burma

- Burmese Air Force

Colombia

- Colombian Air Force

Iran

- Imperial Iranian Army Aviation
- Imperial Iranian Air Force

Islamic Republic of Iran

- Islamic Republic of Iran Air Force

Morocco

- Royal Moroccan Air Force

Pakistan

- Pakistan Air Force
- Pakistan Navy

Thailand

- Royal Thai Air Force

United States

- United States Air Force
- United States Marine Corps
- United States Navy
- Rosenbalm Aviation

== Surviving aircraft ==
In addition to those on static display, there was one known airworthy example at the Olympic Flight Museum by the 2020s. While various HH-43s still exist, some models can be quite rare. For example, only of two of the 18 USAF HH-43A survived and neither is on display.

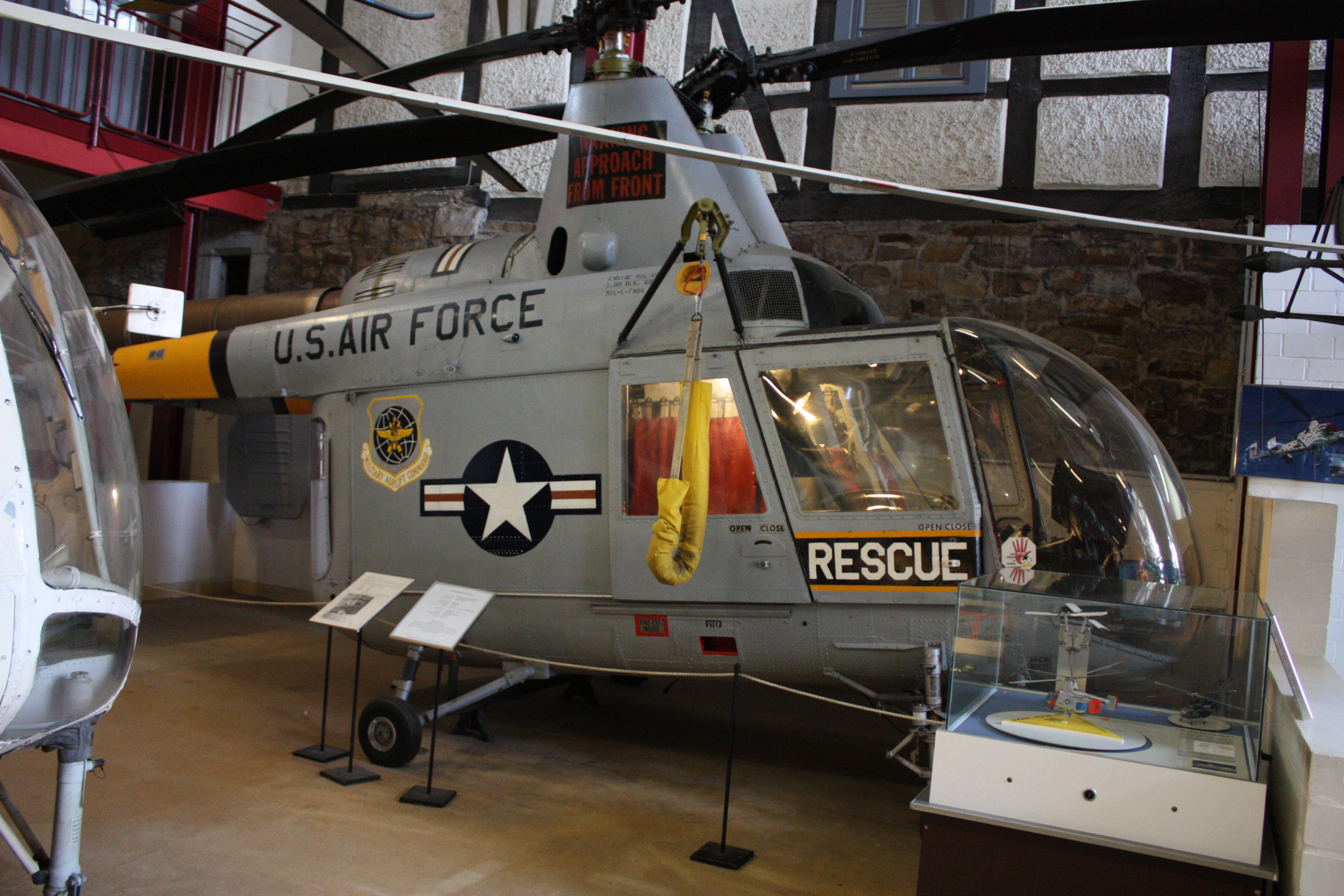
A HH-43B on display at Hubschraubermuseum Bückeburg, Germany

Burma

- UB6166 – HH-43B is on display at the Defence Services Museum in Naypyidaw, Mandalay.

Germany

- 62-4547 – HH-43F on static display at the Hubschraubermuseum Bückeburg ("Bückeburg Helicopter Museum") in Bückeburg, Lower Saxony.
- There are two more in Germany, one outside the Bückeburg museum and one in storage.

Pakistan

- 62-4556 – HH-43P on static display at the Pakistan Air Force Museum in Karachi, Sindh.
- 62-4552 - HH-43B is in storage in Pakistan. There were some plans to transfer it to the U.K.'s The Helicopter Museum and it was restored in 1992.

Thailand

- H5-2/05 – Type 5 on static display at the Royal Thai Air Force Museum in Bangkok.

United Kingdom

- 62-4535 – HH-43B under restoration at the Midland Air Museum in Baginton, Warwickshire. This airframe is one of only two examples on display in the United Kingdom.

United States

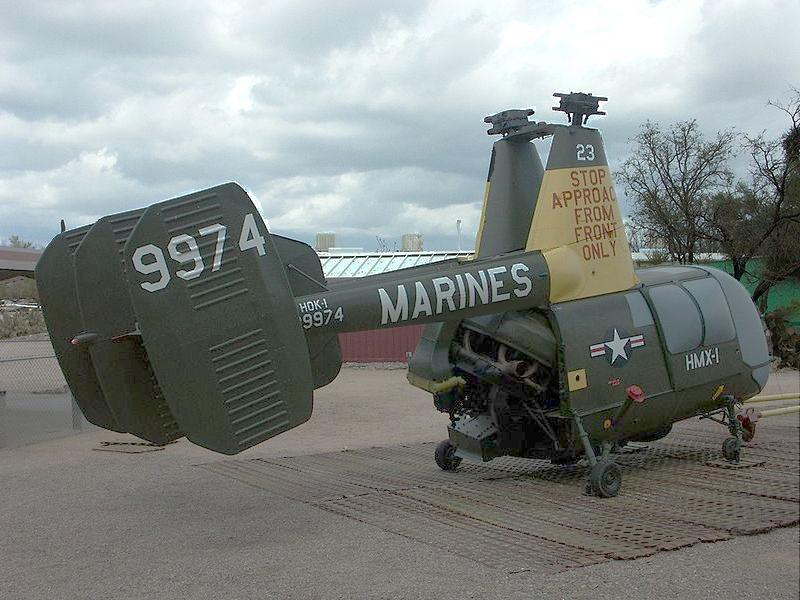
Kaman HOK-1 (OH-43D) Huskie on display at Pima Air & Space Museum (March 2006)

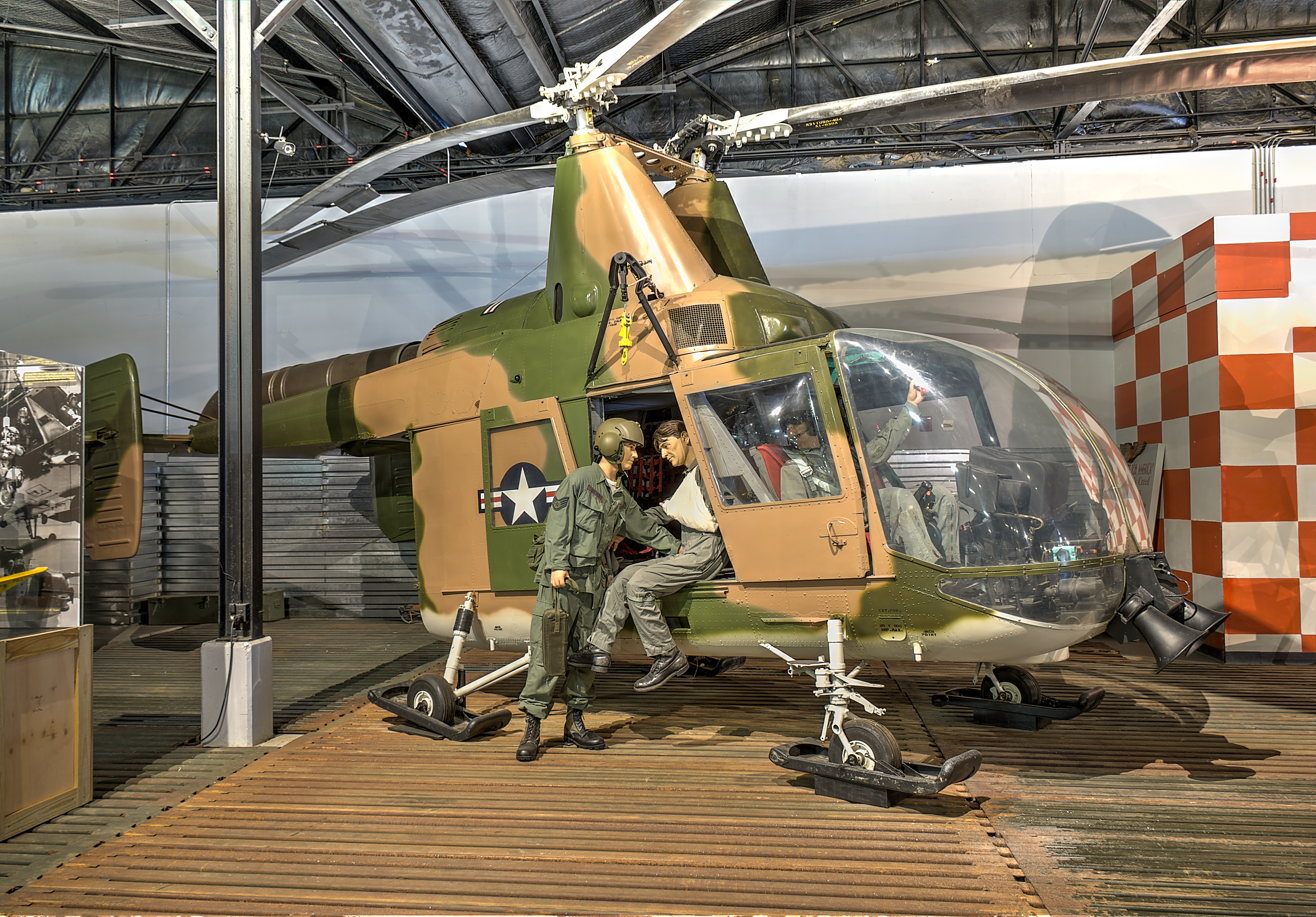
HH-43 on display at the Museum of Aviation

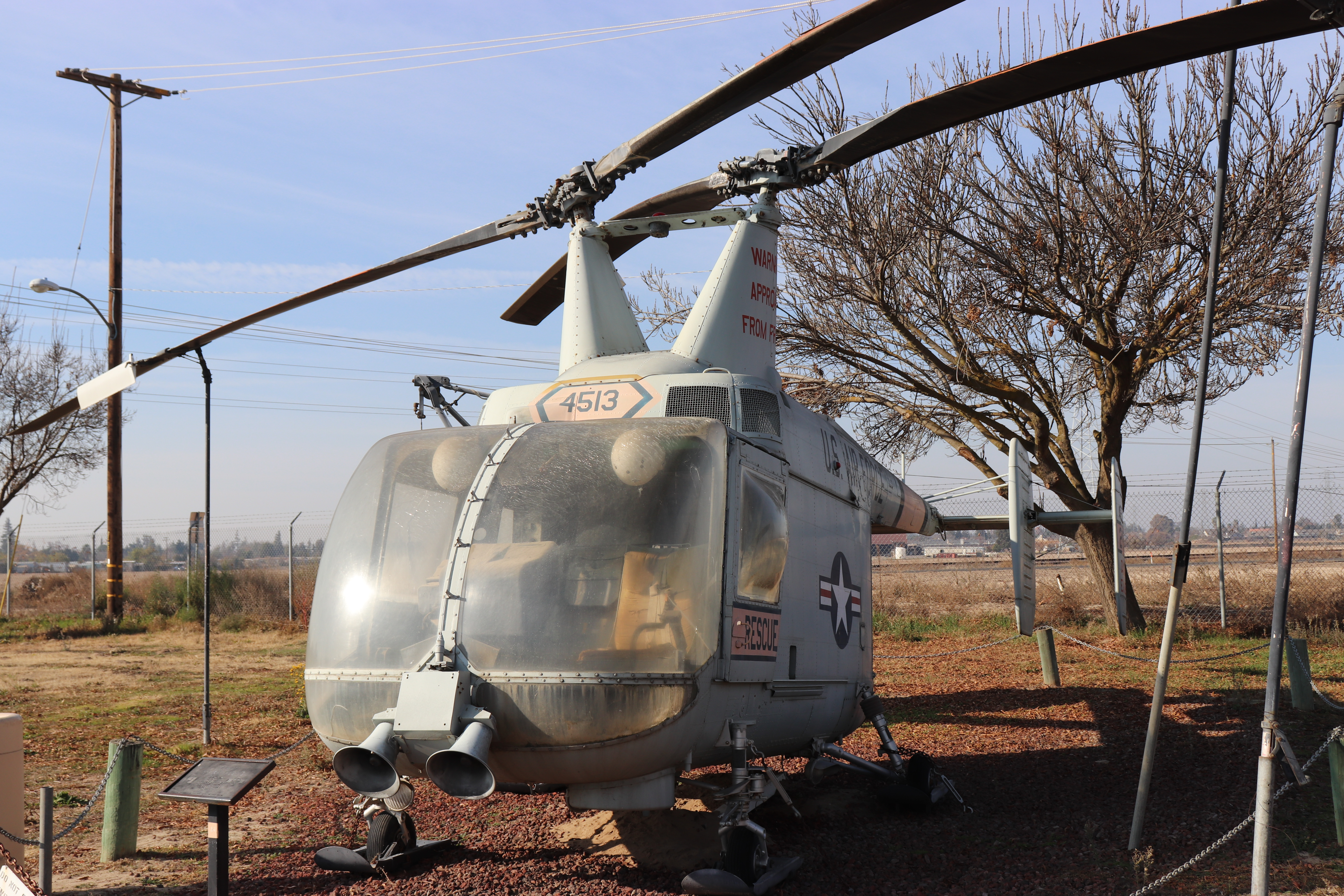
HH-43B Huskie at Castle Air Museum

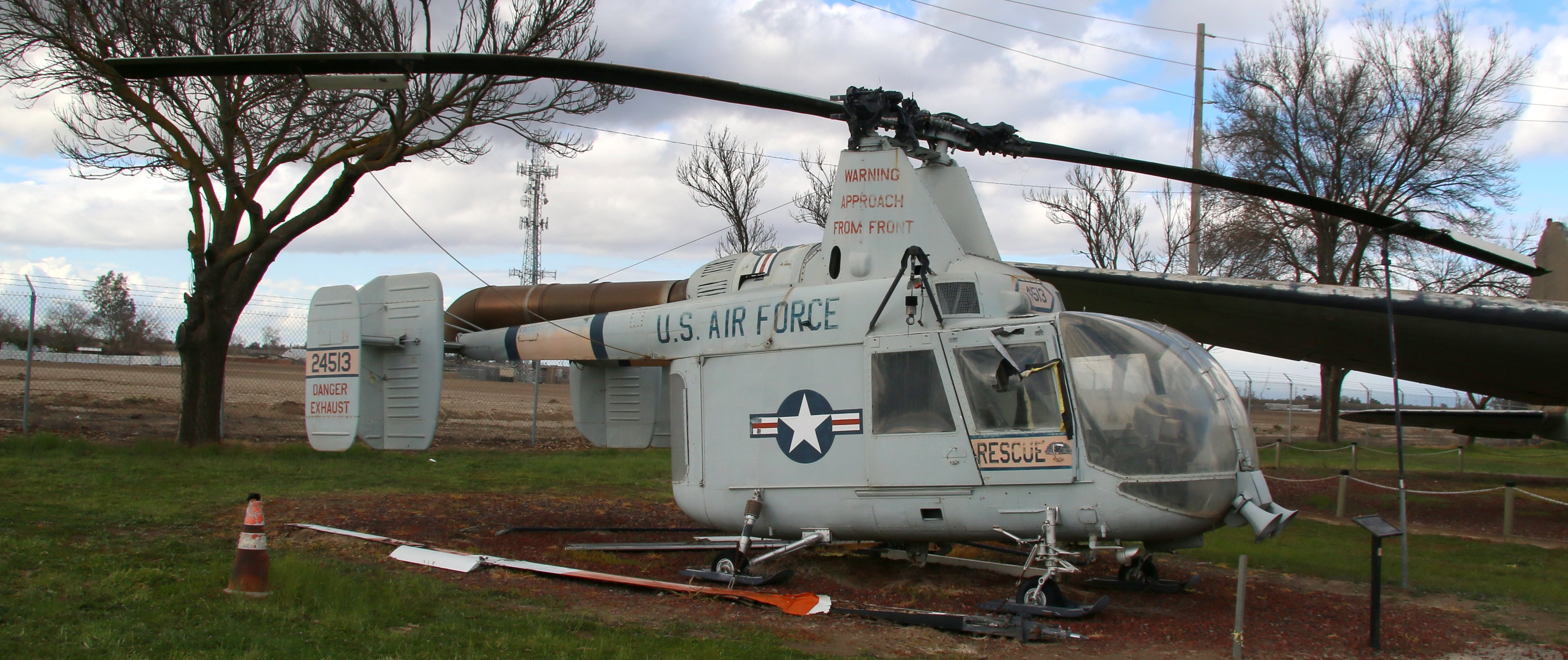
Side view of the same Castle Air Museum example

- Composite – HH-43F on static display at the New England Air Museum in Windsor Locks, Connecticut. This airframe is painted as 60–0289, but was built up from parts of various HH-43s.
- 129313 – HTK-1/TH-43E on static display at the Tillamook Air Museum in Tillamook, Oregon. This airframe is painted in Navy markings.
- 129801 – HOK-1/OH-43S in storage at the New England Air Museum in Windsor Locks, Connecticut.
- 138101 – HOK-1/OH-43D in storage at the United States Army Aviation Museum at Fort Novosel near Daleville, Alabama. BuNo 138101 was formerly displayed indoors at the National Naval Aviation Museum at NAS Pensacola, Florida (circa 1986–2001) in a dark blue finish with USMC markings. It was repainted from its original USMC markings to pre-Vietnam U.S. Army colors when it was loaned to the Army by the National Naval Aviation Museum.
- 139974 – OH-43D on static display at the Pima Air & Space Museum, adjacent to Davis-Monthan AFB in Tucson, Arizona. This airframe is painted in USMC markings.
- 139982 – HOK-1/OH-43D in storage at the Carolinas Aviation Museum in Charlotte, North Carolina. This airframe is painted in Marine Corps markings.
- 139990 – HOK-1/OH-43D in storage at the Flying Leatherneck Aviation Museum at MCAS Miramar in San Diego, California. This airframe is painted in USMC markings. It was previously on display at MCAS Tustin in Tustin, California; but was moved to MCAS Miramar after MCAS Tustin was closed and NAS Miramar was transferred from control of the Navy to the Marine Corps.
- 58-1837 – HH-43A in storage at the New England Air Museum in Windsor Locks, Connecticut.
- 58-1841 – HH-43F on static display at the Military Firefighter Heritage Display at Goodfellow Air Force Base in San Angelo, Texas. It is incorrectly painted with Air Force Serial Number 58-1481. This Huskie was a ground trainer (circa 1962–1976) at Sheppard Air Force Base, so it retained the square-tail empennage that was removed from almost all other Huskies after repeated rotor strikes in heavy winds. After being sold by the military, but before arriving at its current location, it was on display at the Pate Museum of Transportation in Cresson, Texas.
- 58-1853 – HH-43F on static display at the Museum of Aviation at Robins Air Force Base in Warner Robins, Georgia.
- 59-1578 – HH-43F on static display at Kirtland Air Force Base in Albuquerque, New Mexico. This may be the same airframe listed on other sites as being located at the National Museum of Nuclear Science & History, which has since moved off-base, but adjacent to, Kirtland Air Force Base.
- 60-0263 – HH-43B on static display at the National Museum of the United States Air Force at Wright-Patterson AFB in Dayton, Ohio.
- 62-4513 – HH-43F on static display at the Castle Air Museum at the former Castle AFB in Atwater, California.
- 62-4531 – HH-43F on static display at the Pima Air & Space Museum adjacent to Davis-Monthan AFB in Tucson, Arizona.
- 62-4532 – HH-43B on static display at the Air Mobility Command Museum at Dover AFB in Dover, Delaware.
- 62-4561 – HH-43B on static display at the Hill Aerospace Museum at Hill AFB in Roy, Utah.
- 64-17558 – HH-43F airworthy at the Olympic Flight Museum in Olympia, Washington. This airframe is painted in USAF markings.

== Specifications (HH-43F / K-600-5) ==
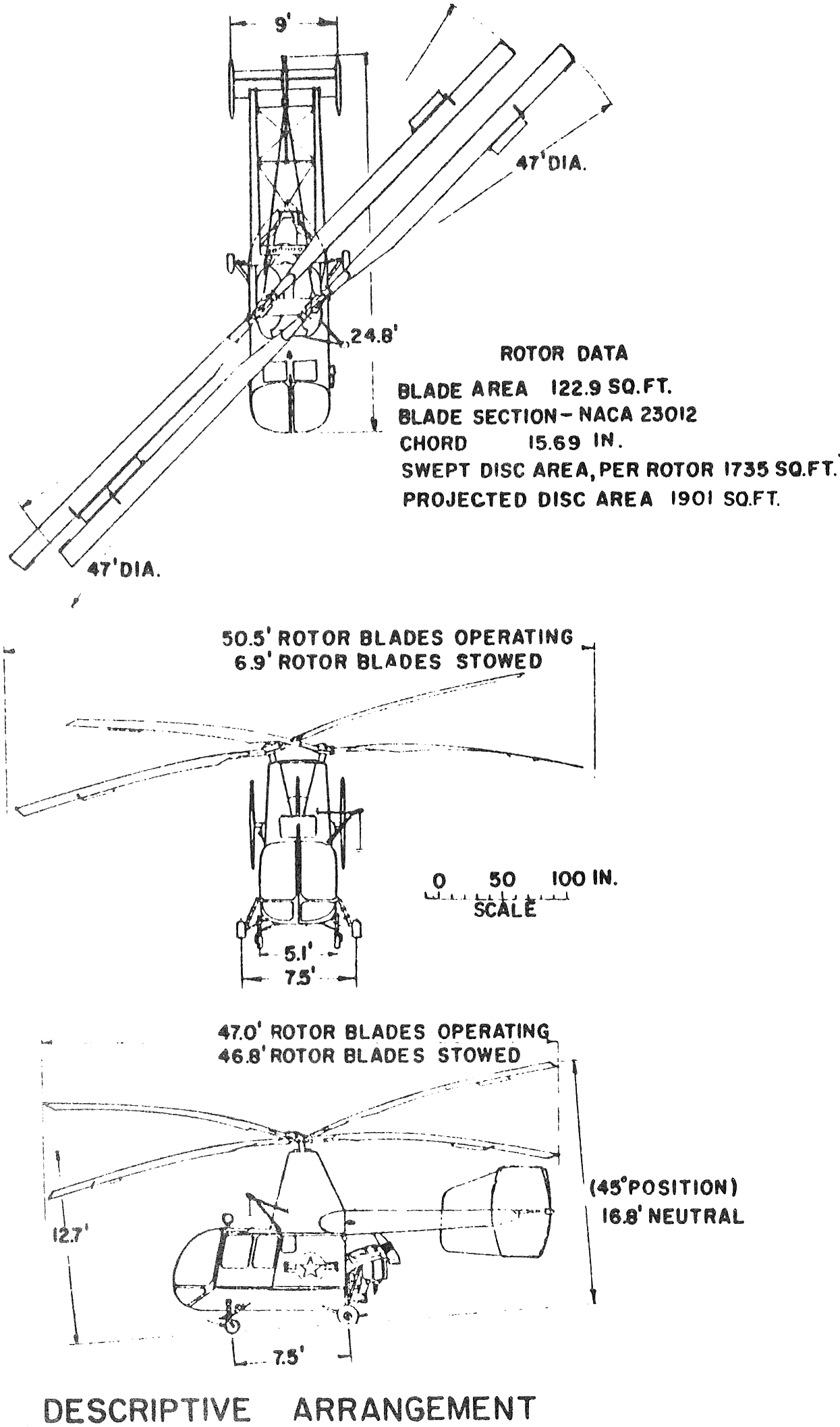
3-view line drawing of the Kaman HUK-1

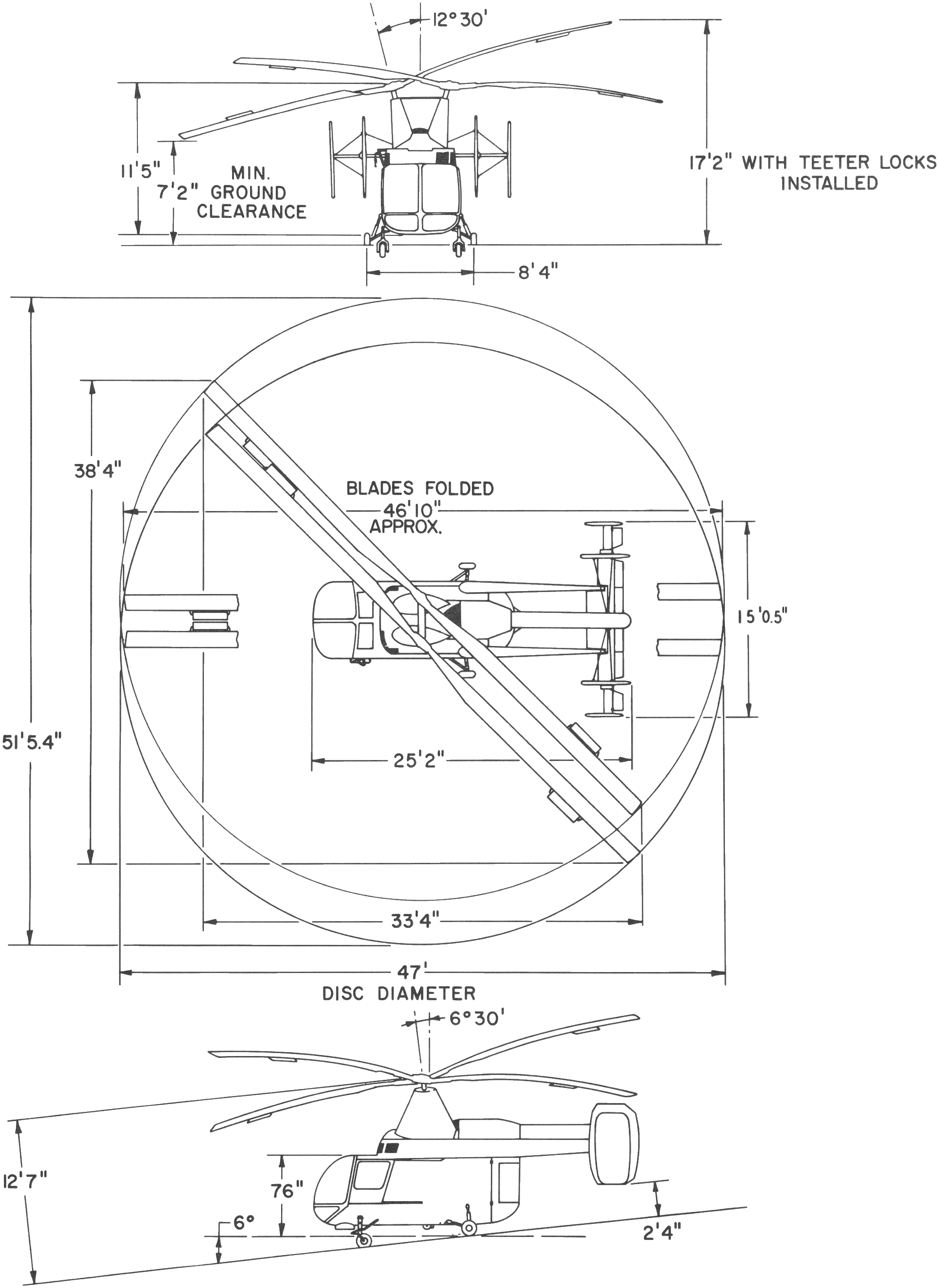
3-view line drawing of the Kaman HH-43B/F Huskie

Data from Jane's All the World's Aircraft 1965-66, National Museum of the United States Air Force : Kaman HH-43B Huskie

General characteristics

- Crew: Two flight crew and two rescue crew
- Capacity: 3,970 lb (1,801 kg) maximum payload
- Length: 25 ft 2 in (7.67 m) fuselage
- Height: 15 ft 6.5 in (4.737 m) to tip of highest blade

12 ft 7 in (4 m) to top of rotor pylons

- Empty weight: 4,620 lb (2,096 kg)
- Gross weight: 6,500 lb (2,948 kg)
- Max takeoff weight: 9,150 lb (4,150 kg)
- Fuel capacity: 350 US gal (291 imp gal; 1,325 L)
- Powerplant: 1 × Lycoming T53-L-11A turboshaft engine, 825 shp (615 kW) (de-rated from 1,150 shp (858 kW))
- Main rotor diameter: 2 × 47 ft 0 in (14.33 m)
- Main rotor area: 3,470.34 sq ft (322.405 m^{2})
- Blade section: - root: NACA 23012; tip: NACA 23011

Performance

- Maximum speed: 120 mph (190 km/h, 100 kn)
- Cruise speed: 110 mph (180 km/h, 96 kn)
- Range: 504 mi (811 km, 438 nmi) at 5,000 ft (1,500 m) and 8,270 lb (3,750 kg) TOW
- Service ceiling: 23,000 ft (7,000 m)
- Hover ceiling IGE: 20,000 ft (6,100 m)
- Hover ceiling OGE: 16,000 ft (4,900 m)
- Rate of climb: 1,800 ft/min (9.1 m/s)

== See also ==
- United States Army Aviation and Missile Command
- William H. Pitsenbarger - HH-43F crewman and posthumous Medal of Honor awardee

Related development

- Kaman K-MAX
- Kaman K-1125

Aircraft of comparable role, configuration, and era

- Flettner Fl 282

Related lists

- List of active United States military aircraft
- List of military aircraft of the United States
