= List of X-planes =

Series of experimental US aircraft and rockets

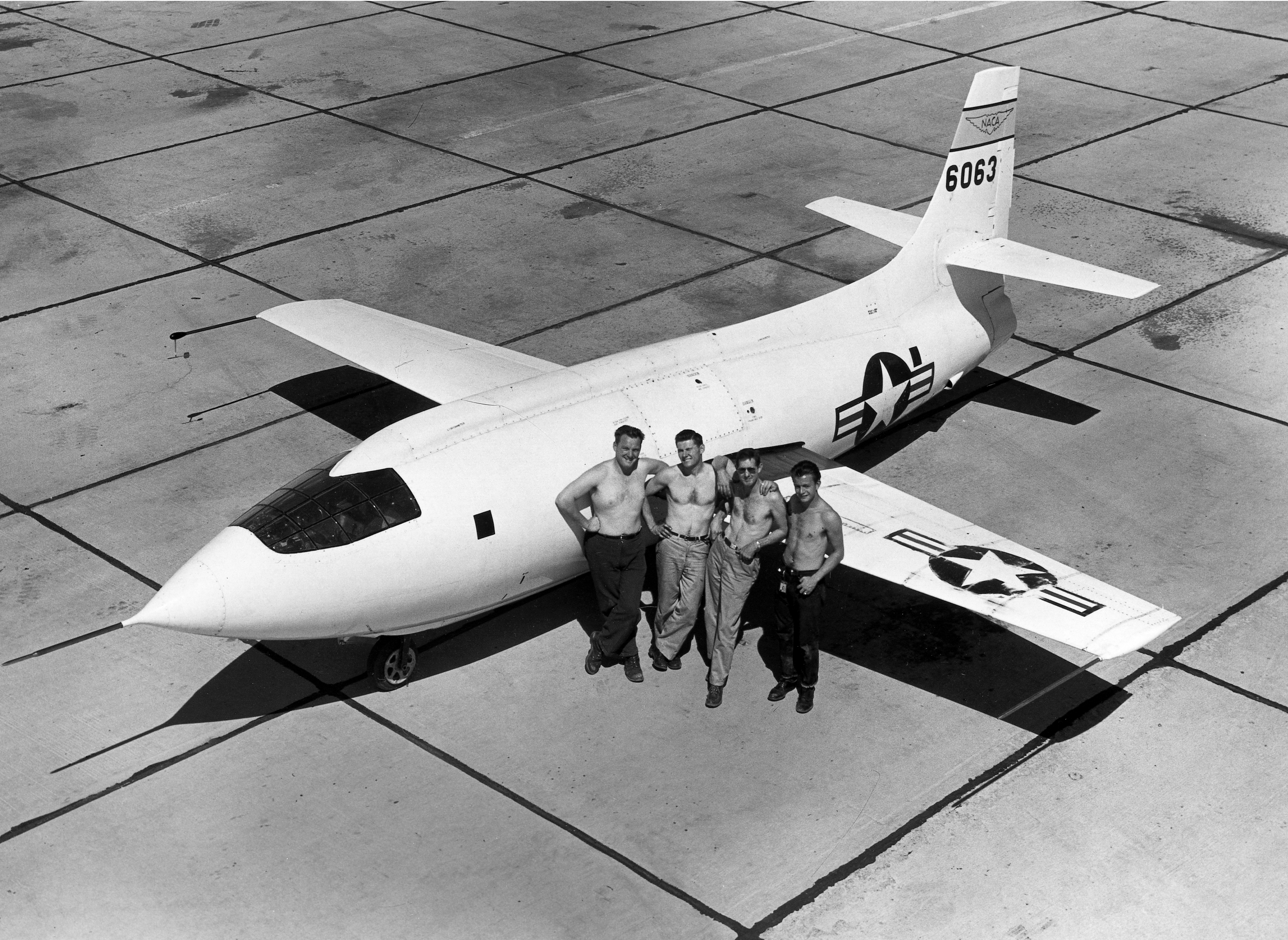
Bell X-1-2

The X-planes are a series of experimental United States aircraft and rockets, used to test and evaluate new technologies and aerodynamic concepts. They have an X designator within the US system of aircraft designations, which denotes the experimental research mission.

Not all US experimental aircraft have been designated as X-planes; some received US Navy designations before 1962, while others have been known only by manufacturers' designations, (Note: For example, the Piasecki PA-97) non-'X'-series designations, (Note: For example, the NASA AD-1 and Bell XV-15) or classified codenames. (Note: For example, the Northrop Tacit Blue) This list only includes the designated X-planes.

== History ==
The X-planes concept officially came into being in 1944, as a joint programme involving the National Advisory Committee for Aeronautics (NACA), the US Navy (USN) and the US Army Air Forces (USAAF), in order to pursue research into high-speed aircraft. NACA later became the National Aeronautics and Space Administration (NASA) and the USAAF became the United States Air Force (USAF). Other organizations such as the Defense Advanced Research Projects Agency (DARPA) and the US Marine Corps (USMC) have also since sponsored X-plane projects.

The first experimental aircraft specification, for a transonic rocket plane, was placed in 1945, and the first operational flight of an X-plane took place when the Bell X-1 made its first powered flight nearly three years later at Muroc Air Force Base, California, now known as Edwards Air Force Base. The majority of X-plane testing has since taken place there.

X-planes have since accomplished many aviation "firsts" including breaking speed and altitude barriers, varying wing sweep in flight, implementing exotic alloys and propulsion innovations, and many more.

New X-planes appeared fairly regularly for many years until the flow temporarily stopped in the early 1970s. A series of experimental hypersonic projects, including an advanced version of the Martin Marietta X-24 lifting body, were turned down. Eventually issues with the Rockwell HiMAT advanced UAV led to a crewed X-plane with forward sweep, the Grumman X-29, which flew in 1984.

Some of the X-planes have been well publicized, while others, such as the X-16, have been developed in secrecy. The first, the Bell X-1, became well known in 1947 after it became the first aircraft to break the sound barrier in level flight. Later X-planes supported important research in a multitude of aerodynamic and technical fields, but only the North American X-15 rocket plane of the early 1960s achieved comparable fame to that of the X-1. X-planes 8, 9, 11, 12, and 17 were actually missiles used to test new types of engines, and some other vehicles were unoccupied or UAVs (some were remotely flown, some were partially or fully autonomous).

Most X-planes are not expected to go into full-scale production; one exception was the Lockheed Martin X-35, which competed against the Boeing X-32 during the Joint Strike Fighter Program, and has entered production as the F-35 Lightning II.

== List ==
In the list, the date is that of the first flight, or of cancellation if it never flew.

List of X-planes
| Image | Type | Manufacturer | Agency | Date | Role | Notes |
|---|---|---|---|---|---|---|
| | X-1 | Bell | USAF, NACA | 1946 | High-speed and high-altitude flight | First aircraft to break the sound barrier in level flight. Proved aerodynamic viability of thin wing sections. |
| | X-1A X-1B X-1C X-1D | Bell | USAF, NACA | 1951 | High-speed and high-altitude flight | |
| | X-1E | Bell | USAF, NACA | 1955 | High-speed and high-altitude flight | |
| | X-2 | Bell | USAF | 1952 | High-speed and high-altitude flight | First aircraft to exceed Mach 3. |
| | X-3 Stiletto | Douglas | USAF, NACA | 1952 | Highly loaded trapezoidal wing | Titanium alloy construction. Underpowered, but provided insights into inertia coupling. |
| | X-4 Bantam | Northrop | USAF, NACA | 1948 | Transonic tailless aircraft | |
| | X-5 | Bell | USAF, NACA | 1951 | variable geometry | First aircraft to fly with variable wing sweep. |
| | X-6 | Convair | USAF, AEC | 1957 | Nuclear Propulsion | Not built. The Convair NB-36H experiment, a B-36 modified to carry (but not powered by) a nuclear reactor, flew from 1955 to 1957. |
| | X-7 | Lockheed | USAF, USA, USN | 1951 | Ramjet engines. | |
| | X-8 Aerobee | Aerojet | NACA, USAF, USN | 1949 | Upper air research | Later models used as sounding rockets. |
| | X-9 Shrike | Bell | USAF | 1949 | Guidance and propulsion technology | Assisted development of GAM-63 Rascal missile. |
| | X-10 | North American | USAF | 1953 | SM-64 Navajo missile testbed. | |
| | X-11 | Convair | USAF | 1953 | Proposed SM-65 Atlas missile testbed. | |
| | X-12 | Convair | USAF | 1953 | Proposed SM-65 Atlas missile testbed. | |
| | X-13 Vertijet | Ryan | USAF, USN | 1955 | Vertical takeoff and landing (VTOL) | Jet-powered tailsitting VTOL flight. |
| | X-14 | Bell | USAF, NASA | 1957 | VTOL | Vectored thrust configuration for VTOL flight. |
| | X-15 | North American | USAF, NASA | 1959 | Hypersonic, high-altitude flight | First crewed hypersonic aircraft. Capable of suborbital spaceflight. |
| | X-15A-2 | North American | USAF, NASA | 1964 | Hypersonic, high-altitude flight | Major Pete Knight flew the X-15A-2 to Mach 6.70, making it the fastest piloted flight of the X-plane program. |
| | X-16 | Bell | USAF | 1954 | High-altitude reconnaissance | "X-16" designation used to hide true purpose. Canceled and never flew. |
| | X-17 | Lockheed | USAF, USN | 1956 | High Mach number reentry. | |
| | X-18 | Hiller | USAF, USN | 1959 | Vertical and/or short take-off and landing (V/STOL) | Evaluated the tiltwing concept for VTOL flight. |
| | X-19 | Curtiss-Wright | Tri-service | 1963 | Tandem tiltrotor VTOL | XC-143 designation requested but turned down. |
| | X-20 Dyna-Soar | Boeing | USAF | 1963 | Reusable spaceplane | Intended for military missions. Canceled and never built. |
| | X-21A | Northrop | USAF | 1963 | Boundary layer control | |
| | X-22 | Bell | Tri-service | 1966 | Quad ducted fan tiltrotor STOVL | |
| | X-23 PRIME | Martin Marietta | USAF | 1966 | Maneuvering atmospheric reentry | Designation never officially assigned. |
| | X-24A | Martin Marietta | USAF, NASA | 1969 | Low-speed lifting body | |
| | X-24B | Martin Marietta | USAF, NASA | 1973 | Low-speed lifting body | |
| | X-25 | Bensen | USAF | 1955 | Commercial light autogyro for downed pilots. | |
| | X-26 Frigate | Schweizer | DARPA, US Army, USN | 1967 | Training glider for yaw-roll coupling Quiet observation aircraft | |
| | X-27 | Lockheed | None | 1971 | High-performance fighter-derived research aircraft. | Proposed development of Lockheed CL-1200 Lancer. Canceled and never flew. |
| | X-28 Sea Skimmer | Osprey | USN | 1970 | Low-cost aerial policing seaplane | |
| | X-29 | Grumman | DARPA, USAF, NASA | 1984 | Forward-swept wing | |
| | X-30 NASP | Rockwell | NASA, DARPA, USAF | 1993 | Single-stage-to-orbit spaceplane | Canceled and never built. |
| | X-31 | Rockwell-MBB | DARPA, USAF, BdV | 1990 | Thrust vectoring supermaneuverability | |
| | X-32A | Boeing | USAF, USN, USMC, RAF | 2000 | Joint Strike Fighter | |
| | X-32B | Boeing | USAF, USN, USMC, RAF | 2001 | Joint Strike Fighter | |
| | X-33 | Lockheed Martin | NASA | 2001 | Half-scale reusable launch vehicle prototype. | Prototype never completed. |
| | X-34 | Orbital Sciences | NASA | 2001 | Reusable pilotless spaceplane. | Never flew. |
| | X-35A | Lockheed Martin | USAF, USN, USMC, RAF | 2000 | Joint Strike Fighter | |
| | X-35B | Lockheed Martin | USAF, USN, USMC, RAF | 2001 | Joint Strike Fighter | First in family to use VTOL. Also used unconventional mode of lift engine (lift fan). |
| | X-35C | Lockheed Martin | USAF, USN, USMC, RAF | 2000 | Joint Strike Fighter | |
| | X-36 | McDonnell Douglas | NASA | 1997 | 28% scale tailless fighter | |
| | X-37 | Boeing | USAF, USSF, NASA | 2010 | Reusable orbital spaceplane | Drop test performed in 2006. Seven flights to space since 22 April 2010 |
| | X-38 | Scaled Composites | NASA | 1998 | Lifting body Crew Return Vehicle | |
| | X-39 | Unknown | USAF | | Future Aircraft Technology Enhancements (FATE) program. | Designation never officially assigned. |
| | X-40A | Boeing | USAF, NASA | 1998 | 80% scale Space Maneuver Vehicle X-37 prototype. | |
| | X-41 | Unknown | USAF | | Maneuvering re-entry vehicle. | |
| | X-42 | Orbital Sciences | USAF | | Expendable liquid propellant upper-stage rocket. | Never flew due to technical challenges. |
| | X-43 Hyper-X | Micro-Craft | NASA | 2001 | Hypersonic Scramjet | Holds record for fastest jet powered aircraft. |
| | X-44 MANTA | Lockheed Martin | USAF, NASA | 2000 | F-22-based Multi-Axis No-Tail Aircraft thrust vectoring | Canceled, never flew. |
| | X-45 | Boeing | DARPA, USAF | 2002 | Unmanned combat air vehicle (UCAV) | |
| | X-46 | Boeing | DARPA, USN | 2003 | Unmanned combat air vehicle (UCAV). | Naval use. Canceled, never flew. |
| | X-47A Pegasus | Northrop Grumman | DARPA, USN | 2003 | Unmanned combat air vehicle (UCAV) | Naval use. |
| | X-47B | Northrop Grumman | DARPA, USN | 2011 | UCAV | Naval use. |
| | X-47C | Northrop Grumman | USAF | | Manned bomber | Proposal for a new-generation strategic bomber. Design only. |
| | X-48 | Boeing | NASA | 2007 | Blended Wing Body (BWB) | |
| | X-49 SpeedHawk | Piasecki | US Army | 2007 | Compound helicopter Vectored Thrust Ducted Propeller (VTDP) testbed. | |
| | X-50 Dragonfly | Boeing | DARPA | 2003 | Canard Rotor/Wing | |
| | X-51 Waverider | Boeing | USAF | 2010 | Hypersonic scramjet | |
| — | X-52 | — | — | — | — | Number skipped to avoid confusion with Boeing B-52 Stratofortress. |
| | X-53 | Boeing | NASA, USAF | 2002 | Active Aeroelastic Wing | |
| | X-54 | Gulfstream | NASA | | Low-noise supersonic transport in development. | |
| | X-55 | Lockheed Martin | USAF | 2009 | Advanced Composite Cargo Aircraft (ACCA) | |
| | X-56 | Lockheed Martin | USAF/NASA | 2013 | Active flutter suppression and gust load alleviation | Part of the high-altitude, long-endurance (HALE) reconnaissance aircraft program. |
| | X-57 Maxwell | ESAero/Tecnam | NASA | 2023 | Low emission plane powered entirely by electric motors | Part of NASA's Scalable Convergent Electric Propulsion Technology Operations Research project (SCEPTOR). Cancelled in 2023, never flew. |
| — | X-58 | — | — | — | — | Number skipped; slot assigned to Kratos XQ-58 Valkyrie. |
| | X-59 Quesst | Lockheed Martin | NASA | 2025 | Quiet supersonic transport aircraft | |
| | X-60 | Generation Orbit Launch Services | USAF | | Air-launched rocket for hypersonic flight research | |
| | X-61 Gremlins | Dynetics | DARPA | 2020 | Air-launched and air-recoverable reconnaissance unmanned air vehicle (UAV) | |
| | X-62 VISTA | Lockheed Martin/Calspan | USAF | 2021 | "Variable In-flight Simulator Test Aircraft" | First flew in 1993 as the NF-16D (for the MATV program). Designated the X-62A during a major research system upgrade in 2021. Assigned to the USAF Test Pilot School. |
| — | X-63 | ABL Space Systems | AFRL | 2023 | Modular aerospike engine launch vehicle testbed based on RS1. | The RS1 launch vehicle first flew on Jan 10, 2023. The launch ended in failure. |
| — | X-64 | Invocon Inc. | AFRL | — | Modular aerospike engine launch vehicle testbed | |
| | X-65 CRANE | Aurora Flight Sciences | DARPA | 2027 | "Control of Revolutionary Aircraft with Novel Effectors" | |
| | X-66 | Boeing | NASA | 2028 | Transonic truss-braced wing | |
| — | X-67 | — | — | — | — | Number Skipped, slot assigned to General Atomics XQ-67A |
| — | X-68 LongShot | General Atomics Aeronautical Systems | DARPA | — | Air Launched Wingman UCAV | |
| — | X-70 Fractal | — | — | — | — | — |
| — | X-76 SPRINT | Bell Textron | DARPA, USSOCOM | 2028 | Runway-independent, high-speed VTOL demonstrator | SPeed and Runway INdependent Technologies (SPRINT) program. Targeting cruise speeds exceeding 400 knots. Flight testing planned for early 2028. |

== See also ==
- Experimental aircraft
- List of experimental aircraft
- List of military aircraft of the United States

== Bibliography ==
- Jenkins, Dennis R.; Landis, Tony; Miller, Jay (June 2003). American X-Vehicles: An Inventory—X-1 to X-50 (PDF). Monographs in Aerospace History. Vol. 31 (Centennial of Flight ed.). Washington, DC: NASA History Office. SP-2003-4531.
- Jordan, Holly (2006). "Active Aeroelastic Wing flight research vehicle receives X-53 designation". Wright-Patterson Air Force Base. Archived from the original on 5 June 2011.
- Kaufman, Derek (2009). "Advanced Composite Cargo Aircraft gets X-plane designation". United States Air Force.
- Miller, Jay (1985). The X-Planes: X-1 to X-45 (first UK ed.). Midland Counties. ISBN 0-904597-46-6.
- Miller, Jay (2001). The X-Planes: X-1 to X-45 (third ed.). Motorbooks International. ISBN 1-85780-109-1.
- Parsch, Andreas (2024). ""Missing" USAF/DOD Aircraft Designations". designation-systems.net.
- Parsch, Andreas (2024). "DOD 4120.15-L - Addendum". designation-Systems.Net.
- Norris, Guy (February 2012). "USAF Reveals Latest X-Plane: X-56A". Aviation Week and Space Technology.
