= Northrop Grumman RQ-180 =

U.S. surveillance drone

RQ-180
- Artist's rendering of Northrop Grumman RQ-180

General information
- Type: Stealth surveillance unmanned aerial vehicle
- National origin: United States
- Manufacturer: Northrop Grumman
- Primary user: United States Air Force

History
- Introduction date: 2015
- First flight: 3 August 2010

The Northrop Grumman RQ-180 is an American stealth unmanned aerial vehicle (UAV) surveillance aircraft intended for contested airspace. While there has been no official confirmation as of 2026, evidence points to the existence of the RQ-180 and its use in regular front-line service.

== Development ==
After the retirement of the SR-71 Blackbird in 1999, the US Air Force lacked an intelligence platform capable of penetrating airspace guarded by advanced air defense systems. The RQ-180 was designed to fulfill the mission previously accomplished by the high-speed SR-71.

The RQ-180 appears to be a follow-on to the Joint Unmanned Combat Air Systems project which was cancelled in late 2005 when the United States Navy (USN) wanted a carrier-based aircraft (which led to the UCAS-D) while the United States Air Force (USAF) wanted a larger, long-range global strike platform. In December 2005, the program was split into two, with the USN starting the UCAS-D program, which created the Northrop Grumman X-47B, and the USAF starting a "classified program". The program was unmasked in Aviation Week & Space Technology in a 6 December 2013, cover story following several months of research.

The RQ-180 designation was initially speculated on in that story as a logical numerical progression from the RQ-170, and P-175 Polecat. The "RQ" designation (R for reconnaissance, Q for unmanned) indicates that the RQ-180 is unmanned and does not carry weapons.

The RQ-180 was secretly funded through the USAF's classified budget. Northrop Grumman was given the task to build the aircraft after a competition in which it defeated Boeing and Lockheed Martin. Northrop Grumman is believed to have been awarded a development contract for the RQ-180 in 2008, with deliveries of low-rate production aircraft beginning in 2013. Satellite imagery of Area 51 reportedly shows large hangars that could house the 130 ft (40 m) or larger wingspan of the aircraft. The RQ-180 may also be related to the expansion of Northrop Grumman's production facility at United States Air Force Plant 42 in Palmdale, California. The RQ-180 made its first flight on August 3, 2010, and eight additional EMD vehicles were built and flown, with the first production RQ-180 entering service in January 2017.

According to Aviation Week, the secret development of the RQ-180 explains public statements of USAF officials calling for penetrating intelligence, surveillance and reconnaissance (ISR) capabilities with no public acknowledgement of an effort to create one. It may explain the service's lack of commitment to the RQ-4 Global Hawk and instead favoring higher priority "classified platforms". The USAF also does not want to buy and maintain large numbers of MQ-1 Predator and MQ-9 Reaper systems in order to have an aircraft that would have the ability to penetrate denied airspace and persistently provide ISR coverage. The RQ-180 may also be responsible for the termination of the Next-Generation Bomber program in 2009 due to costs, and the emergence of the follow-on Long Range Strike Bomber (LRS-B) program that would be cheaper and work with the UAV. The USAF MQ-X program that was to find a platform to replace the Reaper may have been cancelled in 2012 because of the RQ-180.

Creation of the RQ-180 is believed to be related to the LRS-B program, which will have a new strategic bomber operate with a "family of systems" including a Long Range Stand Off Weapon, conventional Prompt Global Strike missiles, and electronic attack and ISR platforms; the RQ-180 would appear to fill the electronic attack and ISR roles. On October 27, 2015, the LRS-B development contract was also awarded to Northrop Grumman.

Lockheed Martin is developing its own solution to the problem of operating an ISR in defended airspace, known as the SR-72, that relies on flying at hypersonic speeds. Northrop Grumman's stealth design was seen as less susceptible to acquisition problems and risky technologies and could be put into service sooner, as early as 2015. A hypersonic reconnaissance aircraft would have inferior stealth features due to heat stress on radar-absorbent materials and would thus be detected earlier. Moving targets could change position before the SR-72 could reach them.

The existence of the aircraft was confirmed with the briefest of details by an Air Force surveillance chief during an aerospace industry event in 2014.

The 74th Reconnaissance Squadron was activated at Beale Air Force Base, California on 19 December 2019. While the USAF did not disclose what aircraft the unit was equipped with, it has been reported that it was established to operate RQ-180s. Some speculate that due to lack of available hangar space the airframes themselves are actually located at the Tonopah Test Range Airport, and that only aircrew and remote operations are based at Beale AFB. Similarly, the 417th Test and Evaluation Squadron was activated at Edwards AFB, California on 24 April 2018 without a disclosed mission assigned. Having been the first Squadron assigned to operate the secretive F-117 in the 1980s, and because of symbolism present on 417 TES merchandise, similar theories have arose that the 417 TES operates the RQ-180 as well.

In November 2020, the first photograph emerged of what is believed to be the RQ-180. The aircraft was spotted flying at high altitude over Edwards Air Force Base. In September 2021, a second photo emerged, depicting the aircraft high over the Philippines. Some observers noted that the aircraft in the photos is similar in appearance to the Lockheed Martin P-175 Polecat.

In November 2021, the aircraft was featured in a promotional video and referred to as "White Bat".

In March 2026, media reports described a sighting of a stealthy flying-wing aircraft believed to be an RQ-180, or a related design, at Larissa Air Base in Greece. The aircraft was reportedly observed during landing, possibly following a technical issue, although these details were not independently confirmed. The sighting was cited as one of the clearest public observations of an aircraft associated with the RQ-180 program to date. The sighting earned it the colloquial nickname the "Lady of Larissa", similar to the "Beast of Kandahar" before the official acknowledgement of the RQ-170.

== Design ==
The RQ-180 addresses a need for conducting penetrating ISR missions into defended airspace, a mission that was left unattended with the retirement of the Lockheed SR-71 Blackbird in 1999. It is equipped with an AESA radar and passive electronic surveillance measures, and may be capable of conducting electronic attack missions. The RQ-180 shows a shift from UAVs that operate in permissive environments, such as the RQ-4 Global Hawk and MQ-9 Reaper, to ones that can perform missions in contested airspace. It is larger, stealthier, and has a longer range than the RQ-170 Sentinel which has previously been used for those types of missions. The RQ-180 is believed to be about the size of the Global Hawk, which weighs 32,250 lb (14,630 kg), and has similar capabilities of endurance (24 hours) and range — 12,000 nmi (14,000 mi; 22,000 km). This is much more than the RQ-170's endurance of 5–6 hours. It has superior all-aspect, broadband radar cross-section reduction features compared to previous stealth aircraft such as the F-117 Nighthawk, F-22 Raptor and F-35 Lightning II. The airframe has improved aerodynamics to give better range, endurance, and service ceiling.

The RQ-180 is believed to have a cranked-kite layout like the X-47B, but with a much longer wingspan, perhaps as much as 130 ft (40 m). Northrop Grumman claims the wing is more scalable and adaptable than the B-2 Spirit's flying wing shape. Aviation Week constructed concept images, including one on the cover of the magazine, of the stealthy unmanned aircraft that can penetrate an adversary's state-of-the-art air defenses to conduct intelligence, surveillance, or reconnaissance missions. Edwards Air Force Base personnel have reportedly nicknamed the RQ-180 the "Great White Bat" and "Shikaka".

Other commentators believe the RQ-180 can function as an advanced communications relay node, integrating a suite of next-generation datalink technologies including those of the B-2, B-21, F-22, and F-35.

== Operators ==
United States

- United States Air Force
  - 74th Reconnaissance Squadron - Beale Air Force Base, California
  - 417th Test and Evaluation Squadron - Edwards Air Force Base, California

== Specifications ==
General characteristics

- Crew: Zero
- Wingspan: 130 ft (40 m)

Performance

- Range: 14,000 mi (22,000 km, 12,000 nmi)
- Endurance: 24 hrs
- Service ceiling: 60,000 ft (18,000 m)

== See also ==
- Lockheed Martin RQ-170 Sentinel
- TAI Anka-3
- Dassault nEUROn
- Mikoyan Skat
- Northrop Grumman Bat
- Sukhoi Okhotnik
- Hongdu GJ-11

Related lists

- List of active United States military aircraft
