= Boeing Phantom Ray =

Stealth unmanned combat air vehicle

Phantom Ray
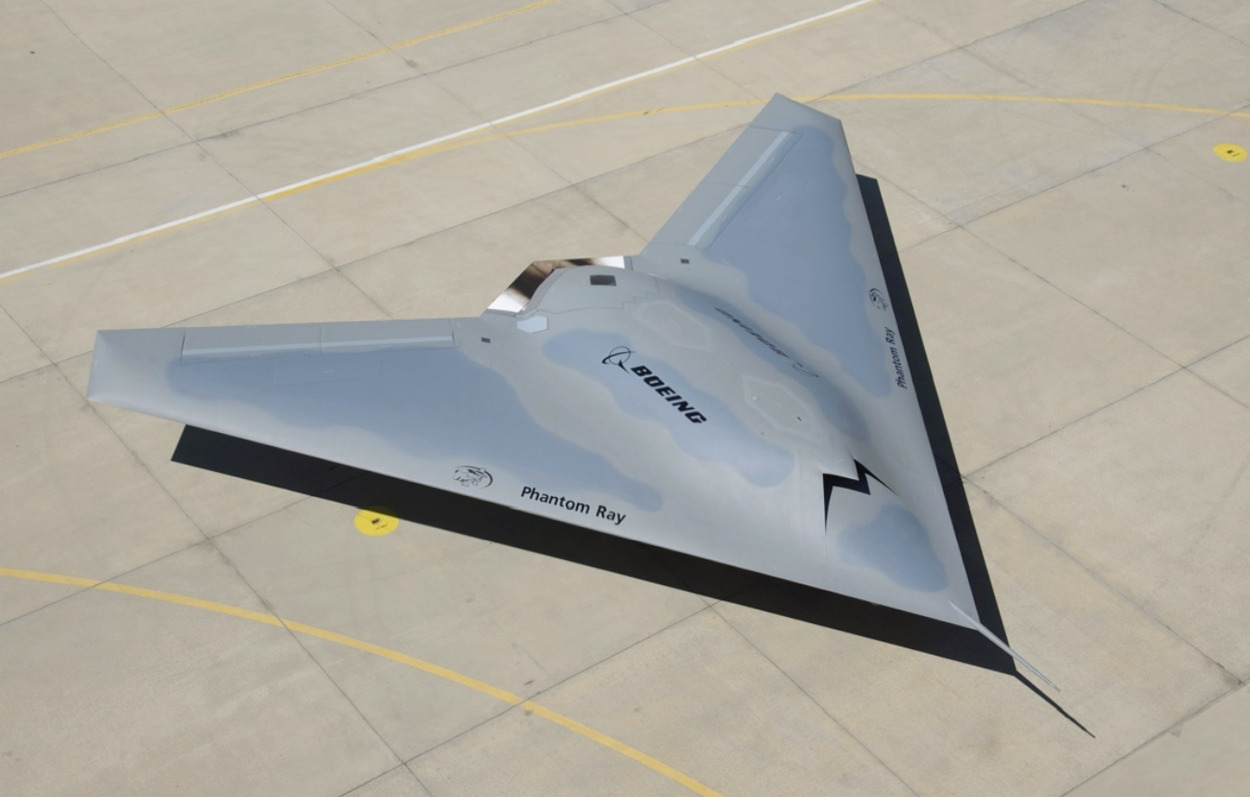
- The Phantom Ray at Dryden Flight Research Center in April 2011

General information
- Type: Unmanned Combat Air Vehicle
- Manufacturer: Boeing Integrated Defense Systems
- Status: Under development
- Number built: 1

History
- First flight: April 27, 2011
- Developed from: Boeing X-45C

The Boeing Phantom Ray is an American demonstration stealth unmanned combat air vehicle (UCAV) developed by Boeing. The autonomous Phantom Ray is a flying wing around the size of a conventional fighter jet, and first flew in April 2011. It will conduct a program of test flights involving surveillance, ground attack and autonomous aerial refueling missions. The developers say it can carry 4,500 pounds (2,040 kg) of payload.

== Design and development ==
The Phantom Ray project, internally referred to as "Project Reblue" at Boeing, was initially conceived in mid-2007 and officially commenced in June 2008. The project was secret within the company, except for a small number of executives and engineers, until May 2009.

Developed by the Boeing Phantom Works, the Phantom Ray is based on the X-45C prototype aircraft, which Boeing originally developed for the Defense Advanced Research Projects Agency (DARPA), the US Air Force, and the US Navy Joint Unmanned Combat Air Systems (J-UCAS) program in 2002. The Phantom Ray was not aimed at any particular military program or competition, although Boeing considered using the design as an entry for the Navy's Unmanned Carrier-Launched Surveillance and Strike (UCLASS) program.

The Phantom Ray was unveiled on May 10, 2010, in St. Louis, Missouri. In November 2010, low-speed taxi tests were carried out in St. Louis. The demonstrator aircraft was to perform ten test flights over six months, supporting missions such as intelligence, surveillance and reconnaissance; suppression of enemy air defenses; seek-and-destroy; electronic attack; hunter/killer; and autonomous aerial refueling. Boeing anticipated that the Phantom Ray would be the first of a series of new prototype aircraft.

The Phantom Ray was scheduled to make its maiden flight in December 2010 from NASA's Dryden Flight Research Center, but this was later rescheduled, and the aircraft first flew on April 27, 2011, from Edwards AFB, having been carried there by the Boeing 747 Shuttle Carrier Aircraft. The Phantom Ray flew to 7,500 feet and reached a speed of 178 knots, flying for a total of 17 minutes.

== Specifications ==
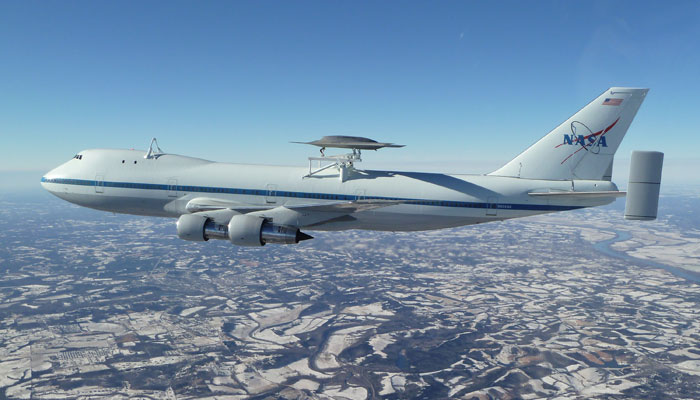
The Phantom Ray being carried on the Shuttle Carrier Aircraft in Missouri in December 2010.

Values for the X-45 are marked with an asterisk (*).

Data from Debut, Boeing backgrounder, Boeing X-45 page

General characteristics

- Crew: None (UCAV)
- Length: 36 ft (11 m)
- Wingspan: 50 ft (15 m)
- Max takeoff weight: 36,500 lb (16,556 kg)
- Powerplant: 1 × General Electric F404-GE-102D

Performance

- Cruise speed: 614 mph (988 km/h, 534 kn) mach 0.93
- Range: 1,500 mi (2,400 km, 1,300 nmi) *
- Service ceiling: 40,000 ft (12,000 m) *

== See also ==
Aircraft of comparable role, configuration, and era

- BAE Taranis
- Dassault nEUROn
- DRDO AURA
- EADS Barracuda
- Northrop Grumman X-47B
- Mikoyan Skat
- Sukhoi Okhotnik

Related lists

- List of unmanned aerial vehicles
