= X47 =

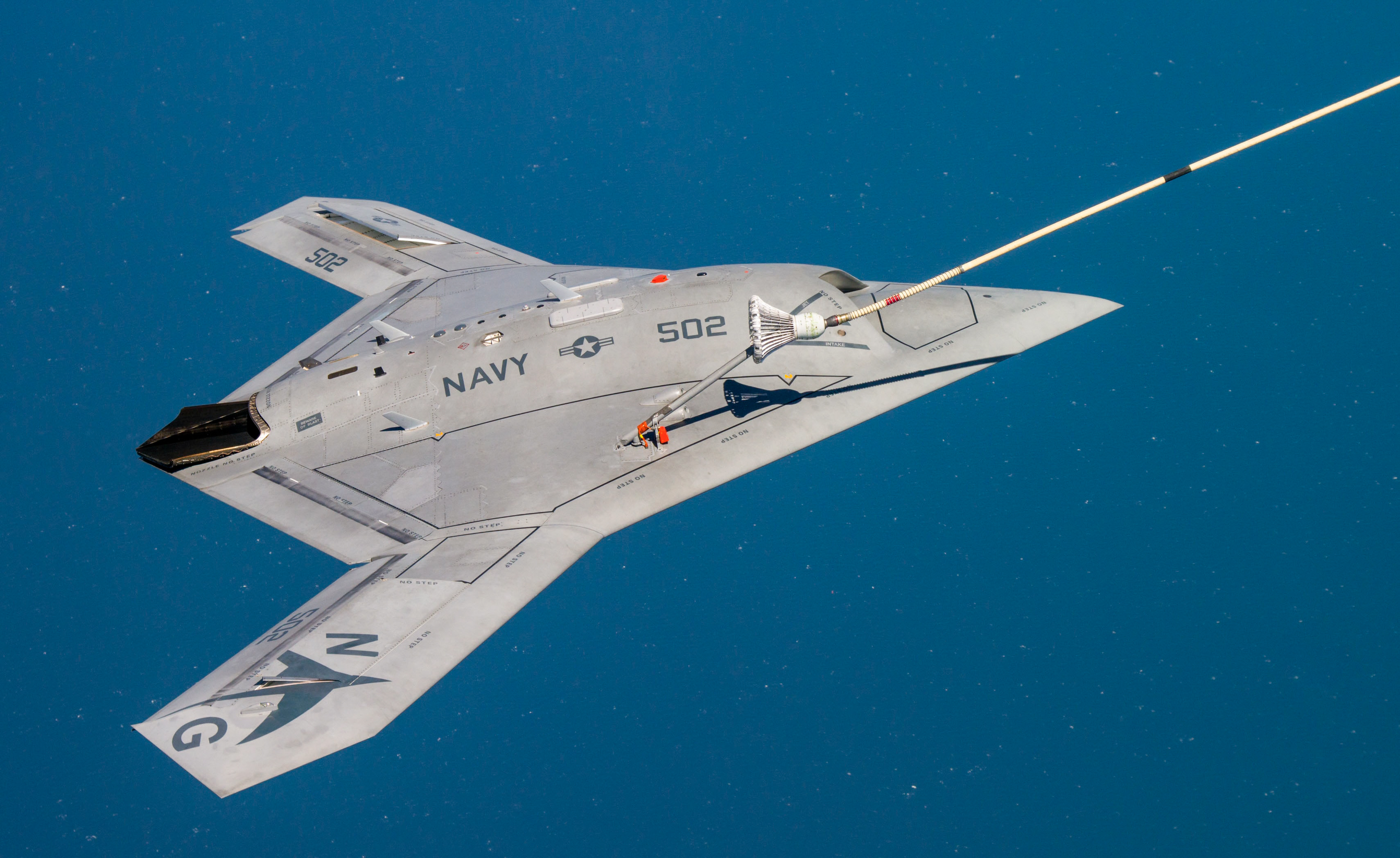
The Navy's unmanned X-47B receives fuel from an Omega K-707 tanker while operating in the Atlantic Test Ranges over the Chesapeake Bay. This test marked the first time an unmanned aircraft refueled in flight.

X47 or X-47 may refer to:

- Northrop Grumman X-47A Pegasus, a Northrop Grumman unmanned aircraft
- Northrop Grumman X-47B, a Northrop Grumman carrier-based unmanned aircraft
- Northrop Grumman X-47C, a proposed stealth unmanned aircraft
