= Boeing Bird of Prey =

Experimental aircraft in the US

Bird of Prey
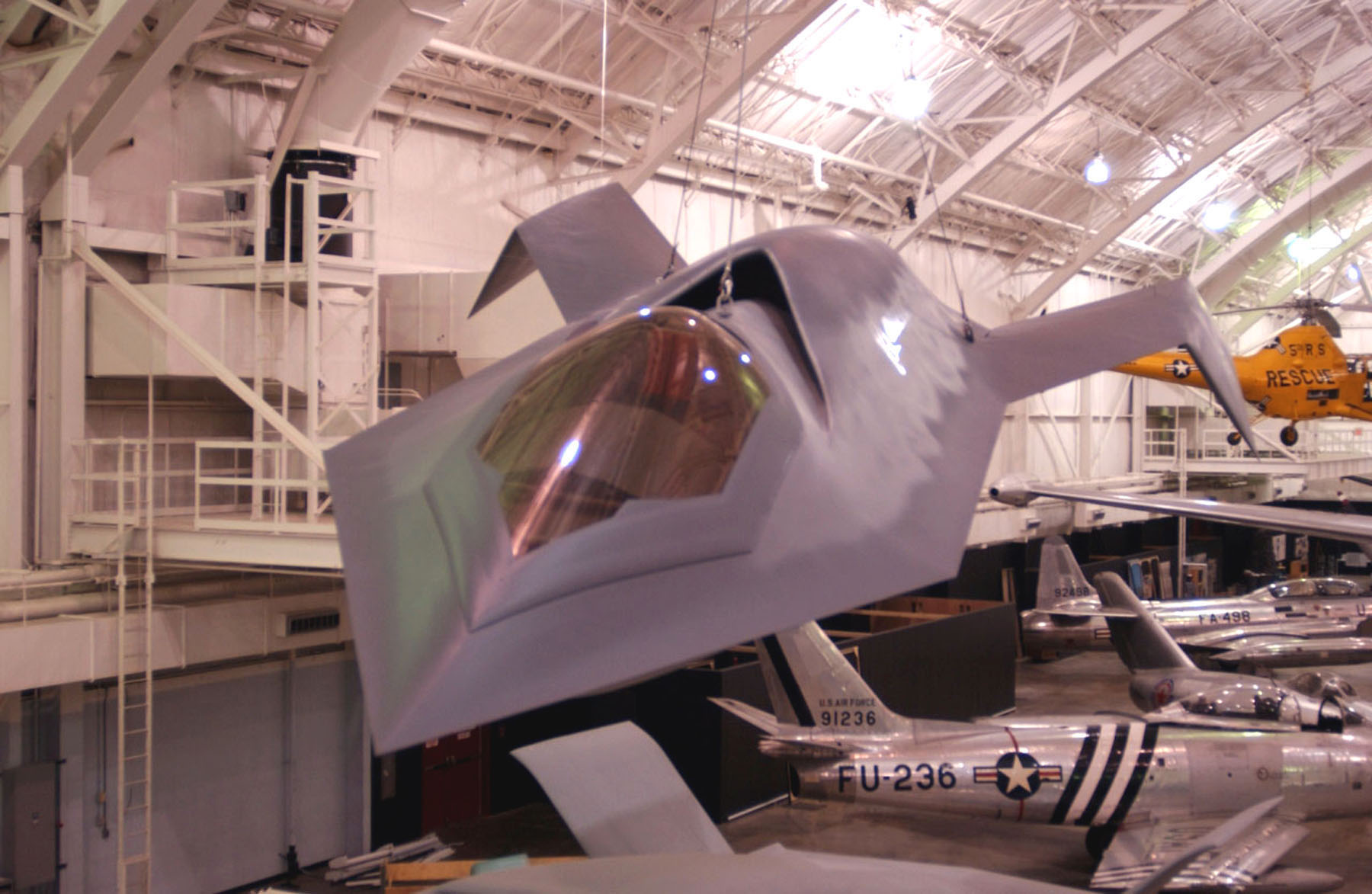

General information
- Type: Experimental stealth testbed
- Manufacturer: McDonnell Douglas / Boeing
- Status: On display
- Number built: 1

History
- First flight: September 11, 1996
- Retired: April 1999
- Preserved at: National Museum of the United States Air Force

The Boeing Bird of Prey is an American black project aircraft, intended to demonstrate stealth technology. It was developed by McDonnell Douglas and Boeing in the 1990s. The company provided $67 million of funding for the project. It developed technology and materials which would later be used on Boeing's X-45 unmanned combat air vehicle.

== Design and development ==
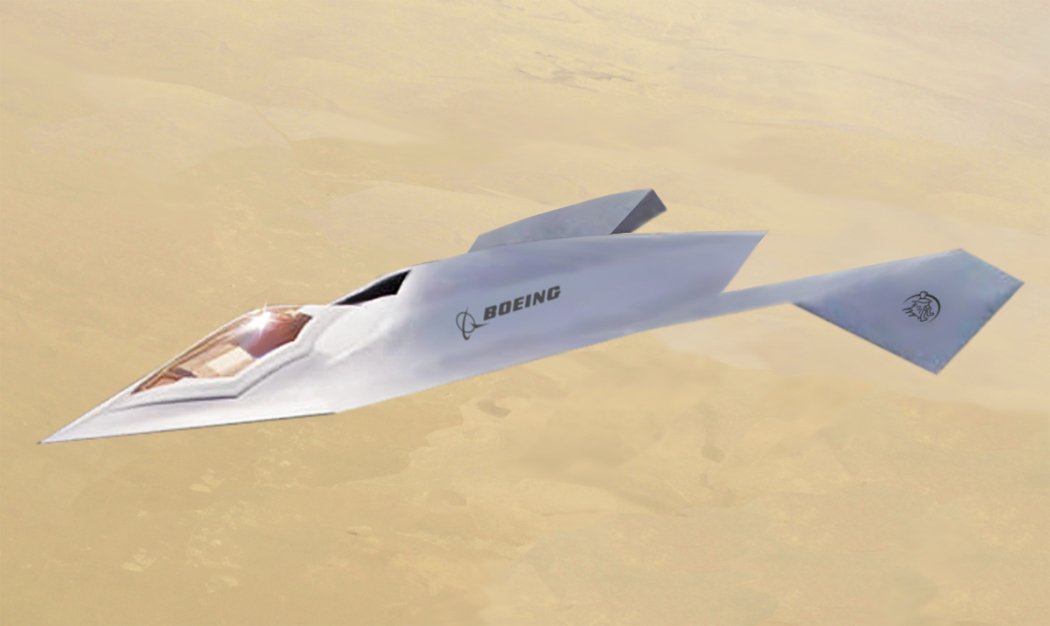
Boeing Bird of Prey concept art

Development of the Bird of Prey began in 1992 by McDonnell Douglas's Phantom Works division for special projects, at Area 51. The aircraft's name alludes to the Klingon Bird-of-Prey, a fictional class of starships in the science fiction franchise Star Trek. Phantom Works became part of Boeing Integrated Defense Systems after the Boeing–McDonnell Douglas merger in 1997.

The first flight was in 1996, and 39 more flights were performed through the program's conclusion in 1999. The Bird of Prey was designed to prevent shadows and is believed to have been used to test active camouflage, which would involve its surfaces changing color or luminosity to match the surroundings.

Because it was a demonstration aircraft, the Bird of Prey used a commercial off-the-shelf turbofan engine and manual hydraulic controls rather than fly-by-wire. This shortened the development time and greatly reduced its cost.

The shape is aerodynamically stable enough to be flown without computer correction. Its aerodynamic stability is in part due to lift provided by the chines, as used in other aircraft including the SR-71 Blackbird. This provided lift for the nose in flight. This configuration, which can be stable without a horizontal tailplane and a conventional vertical rudder, is now a standard in later stealth unmanned aerial vehicles such as the X-45 and X-47, both of which are tailless aircraft that use drag rudders (wingtip airbrakes which are activated on one wing at a time) for yaw control.

The aircraft, which had given the designation "YF-118G" as a cover, was made public on October 18, 2002.

== Aircraft on display ==
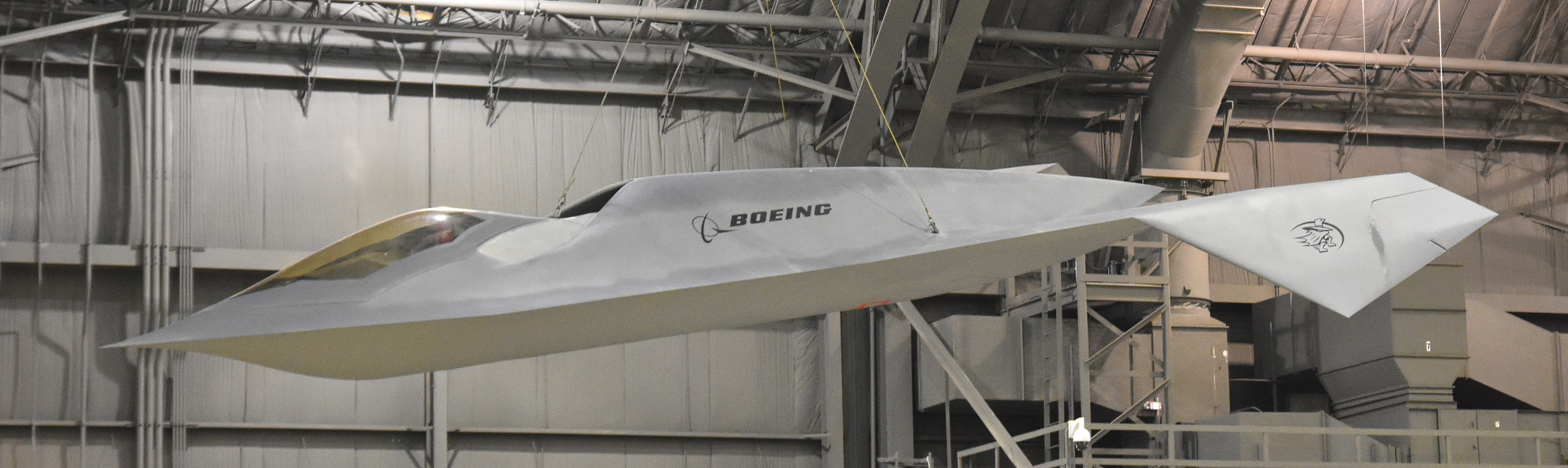
Boeing Bird of Prey at the National Museum of the United States Air Force

The Bird of Prey was put on display at the National Museum of the United States Air Force at Wright-Patterson Air Force Base near Dayton, Ohio, on July 16, 2003. It is now on display at the museum's Modern Flight Gallery above their F-22 Raptor.

== Specifications ==
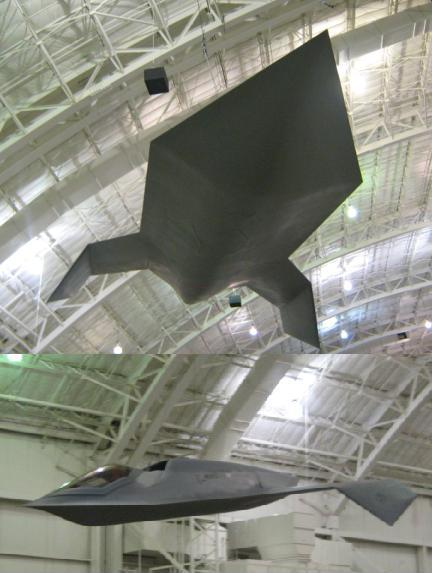
Bird of Prey exhibit at the National Museum of the United States Air Force

Data from Jane's All The World's Aircraft 2003–2004

General characteristics

- Crew: 1
- Length: 46 ft 8 in (14.22 m)
- Wingspan: 22 ft 8 in (6.91 m)
- Height: 9 ft 3 in (2.82 m)
- Wing area: 220 sq ft (20.4 m^{2}) (estimated)
- Max takeoff weight: 7,400 lb (3,356 kg)
- Powerplant: 1 × Pratt & Whitney Canada JT15D-5C , 3,190 lbf (14.2 kN) thrust

Performance

- Maximum speed: 260 kn (299 mph, 482 km/h)
- Service ceiling: 20,000 ft (6,100 m)

== See also ==
Related development

- Boeing X-45

Aircraft of comparable role, configuration, and era

- Lockheed Have Blue
- Northrop Tacit Blue
- McDonnell Douglas X-36
- Boeing Model 853-21 Quiet Bird
