= X39 =

X39 may refer to:

- General Electric X39, nuclear-powered General Electric J47 turbojet
- X-39, aircraft designation is reserved for use with the Future Aircraft Technology Enhancements (FATE) program by the USAF
