= Boeing X-46 =

Unmanned combat aerial vehicle

X-46
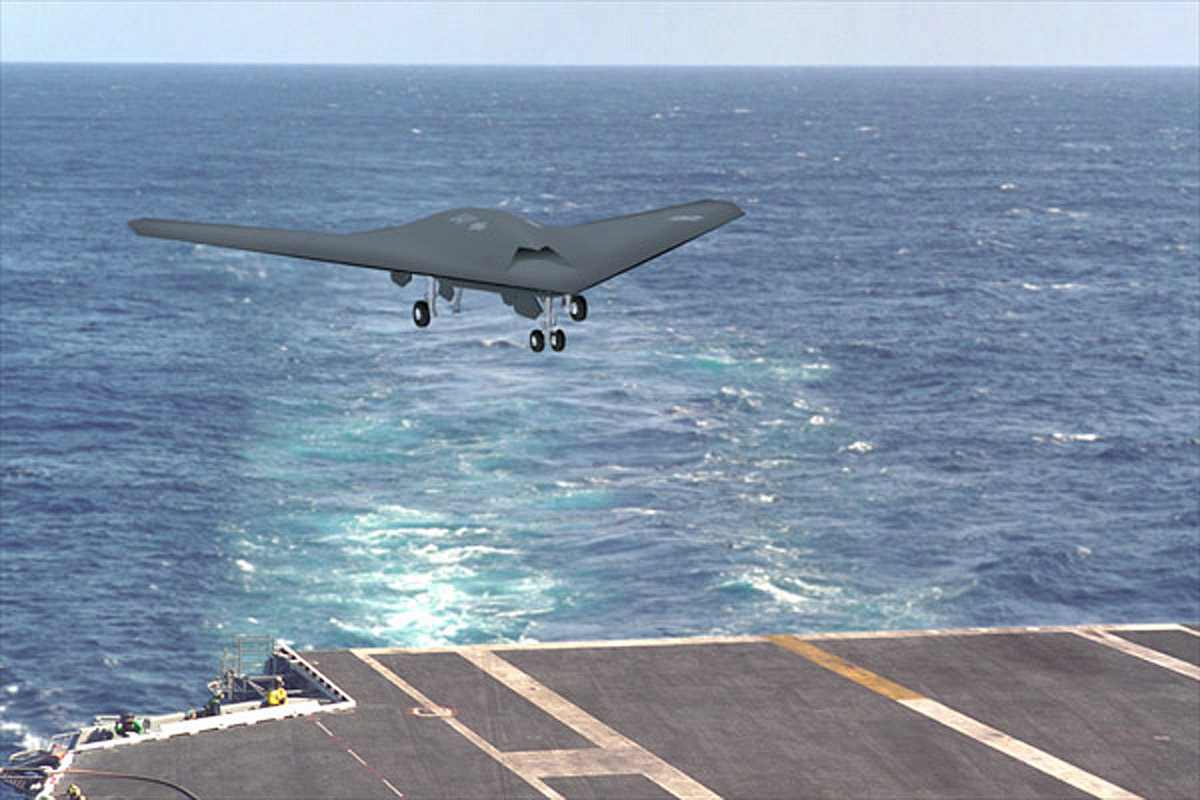
- Artist's impression of an X-46 landing on a carrier

General information
- Type: Unmanned combat aerial vehicle
- National origin: United States
- Manufacturer: Boeing Integrated Defense Systems
- Status: Cancelled
- Primary user: United States Navy (intended)
- Number built: 0

History
- Developed from: Boeing X-45

The Boeing X-46 was a proposed unmanned combat air vehicle (UCAV) that was to be developed in conjunction with the United States Navy and DARPA as a naval carrier-based variant of the Boeing X-45 UCAV being developed for the U.S. Air Force. Two contracts for technology demonstrators were awarded in June 2000, to Boeing for the X-46A and to Northrop Grumman for the X-47A.

However, in April 2003, the Air Force and the Navy efforts were formally combined under the joint DARPA/USAF/Navy J-UCAV program, later renamed J-UCAS (Joint Unmanned Combat Air Systems), and the X-46 program was terminated as redundant.

A Navy-only N-UCAS demonstrator program started in the summer of 2006. Boeing will use material developed for the X-46 and X-45 to propose the X-45N as a naval UCAV demonstrator.
