= NASA X-70 Fractal =

Experimental NASA research aircraft

X-70 Fractal

General information
- Type: Experimental aircraft
- National origin: United States
- Primary user: NASA

The NASA X-70 Fractal is a proposed crewed research plane that was announced by NASA on November 4, 2026. It is to be a high-performance research platform used to demonstrate and develop advanced flight control technology, while carrying an additional 2,000 pounds (910 kg) of research payload.

== Specifications ==
General characteristics

- Crew: 1
- Capacity: 910 kg (2,000 lb)
- Max takeoff weight: 4,536 kg (10,000 lb)

Performance

- Maximum speed: Mach 0.75
- Range: 2,778 km (1,726 mi, 1,500 nmi)
- Service ceiling: 14,000 m (45,000 ft)

== See also ==
- List of X-planes
