= Boeing Phantom Works =

Advanced prototyping arm of the Boeing Company

- Type: Operating Division
- Industry: Aerospace and Advanced Research and Development
- Founded: by McDonnell Douglas
- Headquarters: Washington D.C., United States
- Key people: Steve Nordlund (Vice President / General Manager)
- Number of employees: 2,600
- Parent: Boeing
- Website: Website

Boeing Phantom Works is the advanced prototyping arm of the defense and security side of Boeing. Its primary focus is developing advanced military products and technologies, many of them highly classified.

Founded by McDonnell Douglas, the research and development group continued after Boeing acquired the company. Its logo is similar to one used for the McDonnell Douglas F-4 Phantom fighter.

== Scope and responsibility ==
Phantom Works' organization mirrors that of Boeing's Defense business units, with 'Advanced' versions of each unit (e.g. Advanced Boeing Military Aircraft). The underlying technology is provided by the Boeing Research and Technology (BR&T) organization, who develop new technologies (i.e. Technology readiness level 1–4) for use by Boeing's Commercial and Defense units. Phantom Works responsibility is to grow those technologies into prototype (i.e. Technology readiness level 4–6) to then transition those prototypes to the business units to turn into products (i.e. Technology Readiness Level 7–9).

== Locations ==
Headquartered in Washington D.C., Phantom Works has projects in most Boeing locations in the United States.

Additionally an international group does modelling and simulation work for various governments in the United States, Britain, Australia, and India.

== Known projects ==
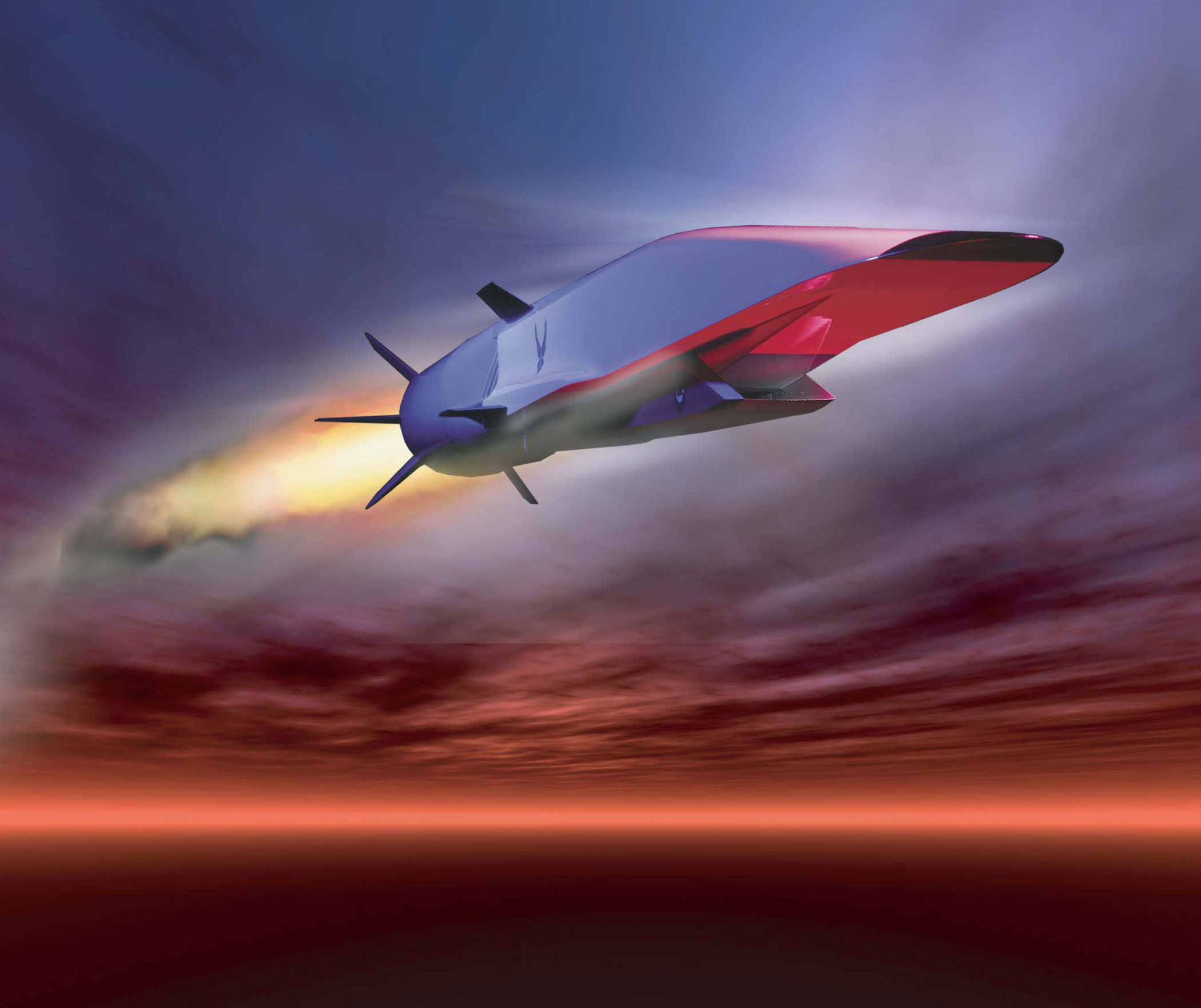
Boeing X-51 Waverider advanced hypersonic vehicle

- Boeing MQ-28 Ghost Bat: Fighter-sized UAV intended to accompany crewed military aircraft
- Boeing Phantom Eye: High Altitude Long Endurance reconnaissance drone
- XS-1: Reusable suborbital space plane
- Boeing Phantom Ray: Unmanned flying test bed for advanced air system technologies
- Boeing X-51 Waverider: Hypersonic vehicle
- Boeing Condor: High Altitude Long Endurance concept drone
- Northrop/McDonnell Douglas YF-23: Black Widow II Advanced Tactical Fighter demonstrator
- McDonnell Douglas A-12 Avenger II: Advanced Navy Stealth Fighter concept
- McDonnell Douglas X-36
- Boeing X-32 Joint Strike Fighter
- Boeing Bird of Prey: Stealth fighter UAV demonstrator
- Boeing A160 Hummingbird: UAV helicopter
- Boeing X-40
- Boeing X-45 UCAV
- Boeing X-37 Advanced Technology Demonstrator
- Boeing Pelican ULTRA
- Boeing X-48 Blended Wing Body demonstrator
- X-53 Active Aeroelastic Wing
- Quad TiltRotor (with Bell Helicopter)
- Boeing F/A-XX: sixth generation fighter concept
- Boeing F-47
- Echo Voyager, an autonomous underwater vehicle

== See also ==
- Skunk Works, a similar division of Lockheed Martin
- NASA Eagleworks
