= Sukhoi S-70 Okhotnik-B =

Russian stealth UAV prototype

S-70 Okhotnik-B С-70 Охотник
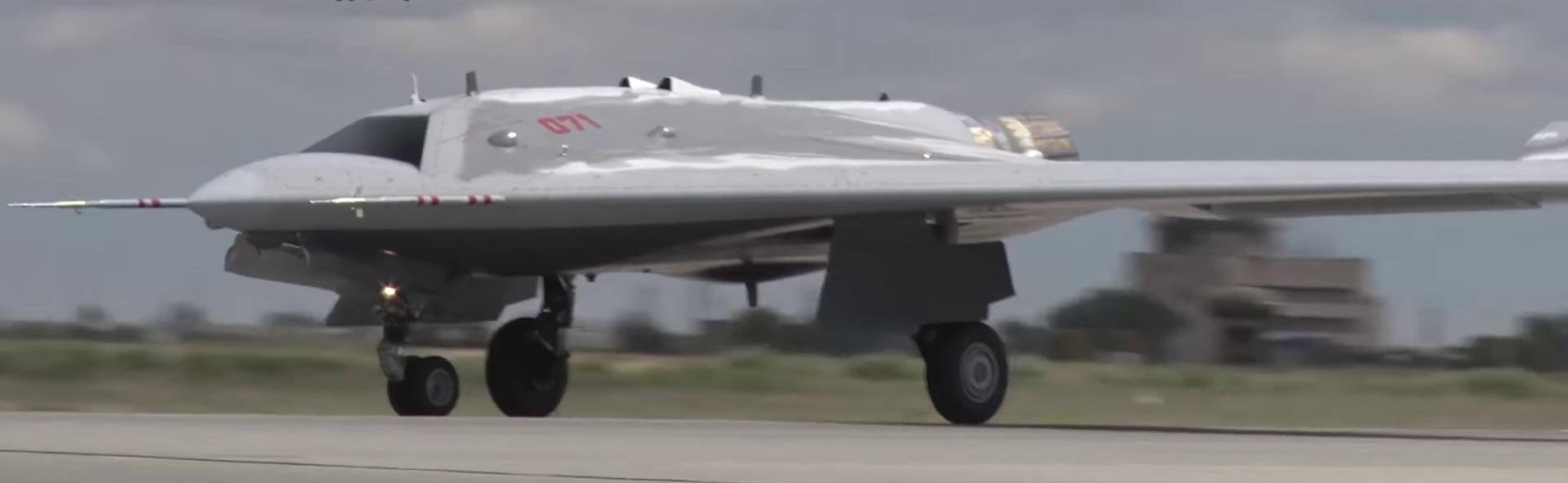
- S-70 prototype 071 taxiing after 2019 maiden flight

General information
- Type: Unmanned combat aerial vehicle; Loyal wingman drone (future)
- National origin: Russia
- Manufacturer: Novosibirsk Aircraft Production Association Plant
- Designer: Sukhoi; Mikoyan
- Status: In development
- Primary user: Russian Aerospace Forces
- Number built: 2

History
- Manufactured: 2019–present
- Introduction date: 2024
- First flight: 3 August 2019
- Developed from: Mikoyan Skat; Sukhoi Su-57

External videos
- Russian MoD Okhotnik coverage
- Okhotnik's maiden flight on YouTube
- Extended video of the first test flight on YouTube
- Okhotnik's first flight with Su-57 on YouTube

S-70 Okhotnik-B

The Sukhoi S-70 Okhotnik-B (Russian: Сухой С-70 "Охотник", lit. 'Hunter'), also referred to as Hunter-B, is a Russian stealth heavy unmanned combat aerial vehicle (UCAV) being developed by Sukhoi and Russian Aircraft Corporation MiG. Several prototypes underwent flight testing in 2019–2023 and, as of January 2024, it was projected that production could begin as early as the second half of 2024.

The drone is based on the earlier Mikoyan Skat, designed by MiG, encompassing some technologies of the fifth-generation Sukhoi Su-57 fighter jet. As of 2021, it was projected to act under the control of pilots of Su-57 jets in a potential future version, similar to the USAF Skyborg program.

An out of control S-70 was deliberately shot down by a Russian Su-57 over Ukraine in October 2024.

== Development ==
The Okhotnik has been under development since at least 2011, when Sukhoi was selected by the Russian Defense Ministry to lead a programme for a new heavy unmanned reconnaissance and attack drone. The new UCAV is being jointly developed by MiG and Sukhoi, based on data of the earlier Mikoyan Skat UCAV programme. The work is carried out by the Novosibirsk Aircraft Production Association (NAPO), part of the Sukhoi company. In the documents, the drone is characterised as a "sixth-generation unmanned aerial vehicle".

The first mock-up intended for ground tests was created in 2014. Prototype of the drone was first revealed in July 2017, showing the drone's flying wing configuration.

In November 2018, the drone performed first series of taxiing, speeding and stopping tests in fully autonomous mode at a runway of the NAPO plant. During the runs, it reached a maximum speed of 200 km/h.

On 18 January 2019, the third flyable Su-57 prototype (bort no. 053) was spotted wearing a new digital camouflage paint scheme, with digital silhouette of the Okhotnik on its top and underside and unique markings on the vertical tail showing the shape of a UCAV flying alongside the shape of Su-57 with a lightning bolt (universally used to show electronic connectivity and data sharing) between the two. On 24 January 2019, first flyable prototype of the drone was seen towed at the NAPO plant. According to Russian officials, the Su-57 is being used as a flying laboratory for the testing of the Okhotnik's avionics systems.

In late May 2019, Okhotnik performed a series of flight tests during which the drone flew several meters above a runway of the NAPO plant.

On 3 August 2019, Okhotnik performed its maiden flight. The drone flew for about 20 minutes at an altitude of 600 meters above Chkalov State Flight Test Center in Akhtubinsk, and made several circles around the airfield. On August 7, the Russian Defence Ministry released a video of the first flight.

On 27 September 2019, Russian MoD released a video showcasing the first flight of Okhotnik alongside Su-57. Reportedly the UAV flew autonomously for more than 30 minutes, interacting with the Su-57 to test extending the fighter's radar and target designation range to enable use of long-range air-launched weapons from outside enemy air defenses.

On 12 February 2021, it was reported that three additional prototypes were under construction at the Novosibirsk Chkalov Aviation Plant, according to a source in the military-industrial complex. The second model is a modified copy of the 1st prototype, with the 3rd and 4th prototypes identical to the serial production unit. Improvements relate to the systems of onboard radio-electronic equipment and structural elements of the airframe. The three additional prototypes were expected to be ready for flight tests in 2022 and 2023. The source in the military-industrial complex also said that the production Hunter would receive a standard flat nozzle to further reduce thermal and radar signature.

On 28 February 2021, it was reported that the Okhotnik would be used aboard the future Project 23900 Ivan Rogov amphibious assault ships, capable of carrying 4 Okhotnik drones, for reconnaissance and strike missions.

In December 2021, a second prototype with a new flat jet nozzle and no afterburner was shown being towed out of a hangar.

Okhotnik reportedly tested unguided weapons such as free-fall bombs in 2021, and carried out tests with precision-guided munitions in 2022.

In August 2023, it was reported that state tests for the Okhotnik would be completed by the end of 2023, with the drone expected to enter mass production in 2024. The vice-governor of Novosibirsk oblast said in January 2024 that serial production of Okhotnik would begin in the second half of 2024.

== Design ==
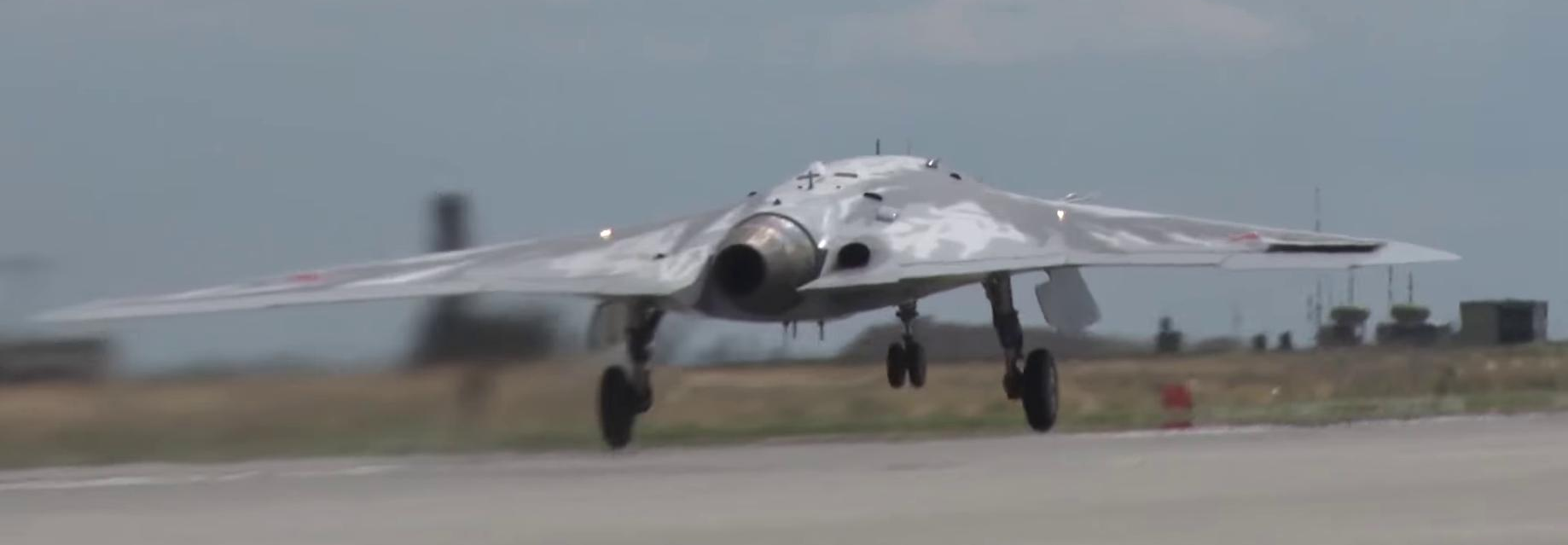
The first S-70 prototype has a non-stealthy circular exhaust

The Okhotnik's design is based on the flying-wing scheme and incorporates use of composite materials and stealth coatings, reducing the drone's radar cross section in flight. It has a weight of about 20 tons and a wingspan of around 65 feet (20 m). The drone is powered either by a single AL-31F turbofan, as used on the Sukhoi Su-27 fighter aircraft, or by the improved AL-41F derivative installed on Su-35S fighters and Su-57 prototypes. The maximum speed of the drone is reportedly 1,000 km/h while carrying its payload internally.

It is a development of the similarly designed flying-wing Mikoyan Skat.

It is likely that the Okhotnik was designed to act as a "loyal wingman" controlled by the Su-57.

While a S-70 model shown at the 2019 MAKS International Aviation and Space Salon has low-observable apertures, the first prototype's exhaust nozzle is conventional, providing no reduction of infrared signature or radar cross section. The second prototype has low-observable apertures.

== Operational history ==
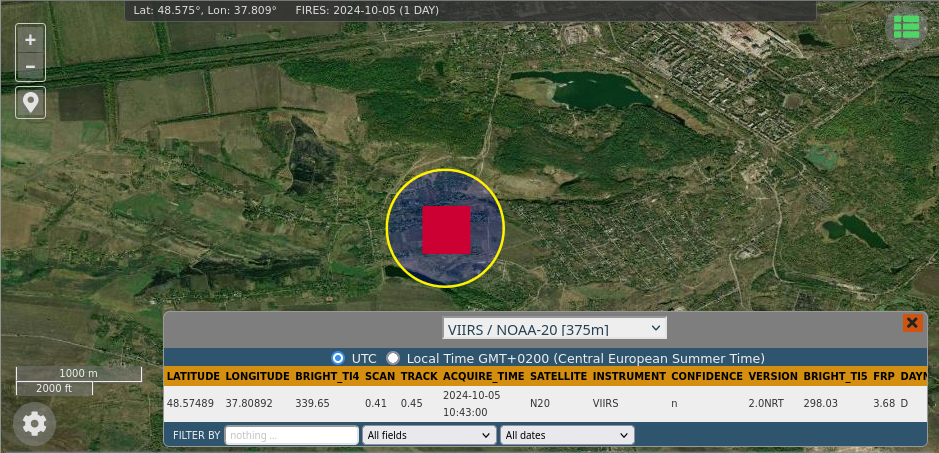
At 10:43 (UTC) on the day of the crash NASA's FIRMS detected a fire near a row of farm houses between Chasiv Yar and Kostiantynivka

On 5 October 2024, an S-70 was shot down by an air-to-air missile from a Russian Su-57, near Kostiantynivka, in Ukraine.

Together the S-70 and the Su-57 had taken off from Akhtubinsk Air Base 365 miles (587 km) behind the front line for an operational test flight. The drone apparently lost contact with its ground control and flew in the direction of Ukrainian-controlled territory. By the time attempts to regain control had been abandoned, the drone had crossed the front line into Ukraine and, subsequently, the Russian Su-57 deliberately shot it down. Identifiable pieces of the wreckage included a large, fairly intact portion of a wing and burned parts of a UMPB D-30SN glide bomb and a turbofan engine. The crash site was reportedly targeted by a Russian Iskander ballistic missile in an apparent attempt to deny Ukraine and its allies access to the wreckage, but crash site footage indicated that the wreckage had already been recovered by Ukrainian police for further analysis.

== Specifications (Sukhoi S-70) ==
Data from TASS, Ainonline

General characteristics

- Crew: None
- Wingspan: 20 m (65 ft)
- Empty weight: 10,000 to 20,000 kg (22,046 to 44,092 lb) (not confirmed)
- Max takeoff weight: 25,000 kg (55,116 lb)
- Powerplant: 1 × AL-41F derivative

Performance

- Maximum speed: 1,000 km/h (620 mph, 540 kn) 0.82 Mach
- Range: 6,000 km (3,700 mi, 3,200 nmi)
- Combat range: 3,000 km (1,900 mi, 1,600 nmi)

Armament

- 2 internal weapons bays for up to 2,000 kg of guided and unguided munitions
  - UMPB D-30SN

== See also ==
- Loyal wingman

Related development

- Mikoyan Skat
- Sukhoi Su-57
- Sukhoi Su-75 Checkmate

Aircraft of comparable role, configuration, and era

- Baykar Bayraktar Kızılelma
- Hongdu GJ-11
- Northrop Grumman X-47B
- Boeing Phantom Ray
- Boeing MQ-28 Ghost Bat, formerly "Loyal Wingman"
- Lockheed Martin RQ-170 Sentinel
- Shahed 171 Simorgh
- TAI Anka-3
- Northrop Grumman RQ-180
- Dassault nEUROn
- DRDO Ghatak
- BAE Systems Taranis
- Kratos XQ-58 Valkyrie
