= Mikoyan Skat =

Russian unmanned combat air vehicle concept

- A full-size mockup of the Skat UCAV at the MAKS 2007 international air show.

General information
- Type: Unmanned combat aerial vehicle
- National origin: Russia
- Manufacturer: Russian Aircraft Corporation MiG
- Status: In development
- Primary user: Russian Air Force

History
- Developed into: Sukhoi Okhotnik

The Mikoyan Skat (Russian: Микоян Скат, skate) is a concept of a stealth unmanned combat aerial vehicle (UCAV) being developed by Mikoyan for the Russian Ministry of Defence since 2005.

== Development ==
Origin of the Skat UCAV dates back to 2005 when Mikoyan started working on the project. Emphasis was put on low-observability and thus the drone was designed in a flying wing configuration, in the form of a triangle, with use of composite materials and with armament hidden in two internal weapons bays. Its only full-size mockup was presented for the first time at the MAKS 2007 international air show. However, the drone didn't get through the mockup stage, and work on the project was stopped later in 2012 due to lack of funding.

As chief executive officer of RSK "MiG", Sergei Korotkov said to the press earlier, the development of Skat was discontinued. By the decision of Russian Defence Ministry, Sukhoi Holding became the new Head Developer of the Strike UCAV project. Still, Skat experience would be used by Sukhoi. RSK "MiG" specialists are expected to work on the new project. On 3 June 2013, MiG signed a research and development contract to build a UCAV, based on the Skat design.

The Sukhoi is using the R&D information from the Skat, in addition to their expertise on the Sukhoi Su-57, to develop their 20-ton Okhotnik-B stealth UCAV.

In September 2018, it was reported the MiG has revived the program and that works on the Mikoyan Skat UCAV are currently underway. According to the CEO of MiG, the tactical and technical assignments for the Skat is planned to be approved by the end of 2019, and the development of the drone will start in 2020.

As of June 2022, the development of the Skat seems inactive, as no news have been reported on it since 2019 and because the Skat was not among the future projects of MiG showcased at the 2021 MAKS air show.

== Design ==
The Skat is a low-observable, subsonic UCAV meant to carry weapons in two ventral weapons bays large enough for missiles such as the Kh-31, powered by a single Klimov RD-5000B turbofan engine, a variant of the RD-93. The single-engine subsonic design has an 11.5 meter (37.7 ft) wingspan, and is 10.25 meters (33.6 ft) long. The UCAV has a maximum takeoff weight of ten tons, with a maximum speed of 800 kilometers per hour (497 mph) at low altitude. It is intended to carry a combat load of up to two tons, with a combat radius of 2,000 km (1,240 miles).

Possible roles include the suppression and attack of enemy air defenses. The first version of Skat to fly was planned to be piloted in order to meet Russian flight regulations. A number of aerodynamic configurations have been wind tunnel-tested, including with small twin fins. MiG has settled on a tailless configuration.

== Specifications (Projected) ==
Plan diagram of the Mikoyan Skat

General characteristics

- Crew: none
- Length: 10.25 m (33 ft 7 in)
- Wingspan: 11.5 m (37 ft 8 in)
- Powerplant: 1 × Klimov RD-5000B , 50.4 kN (11,340 lbf) thrust

Performance

- Maximum speed: 850 km/h (497 mph, 432 kn)
- Service ceiling: 15,000 m (39,370 ft)

Armament
Up to 2 tons of weapons in internal bays

=== Missiles ===
- Kh-31 supersonic air-launched missile

(Kh-31A as air-to-surface missile and Kh-31P as the air-to-radar one)

=== Bombs ===
- KAB-500Kr 500 kg TV-guided bomb
- KAB-250 250 kg guided bombs

== See also ==
Related development

- Sukhoi S-70 Okhotnik-B

Aircraft of comparable role, configuration, and era

- AVIC 601-S
- Boeing X-45
- Northrop Grumman X-47B
- Boeing Phantom Ray
- Lockheed Martin RQ-170 Sentinel
- Northrop Grumman RQ-180
- Dassault nEUROn
- BAE Systems Taranis
- DRDO Ghatak - experimental
- Hongdu GJ-11
