= Northrop Grumman X-47B =

Unmanned combat air vehicle demonstrator built by Northrop Grumman

X-47B UCAS-D
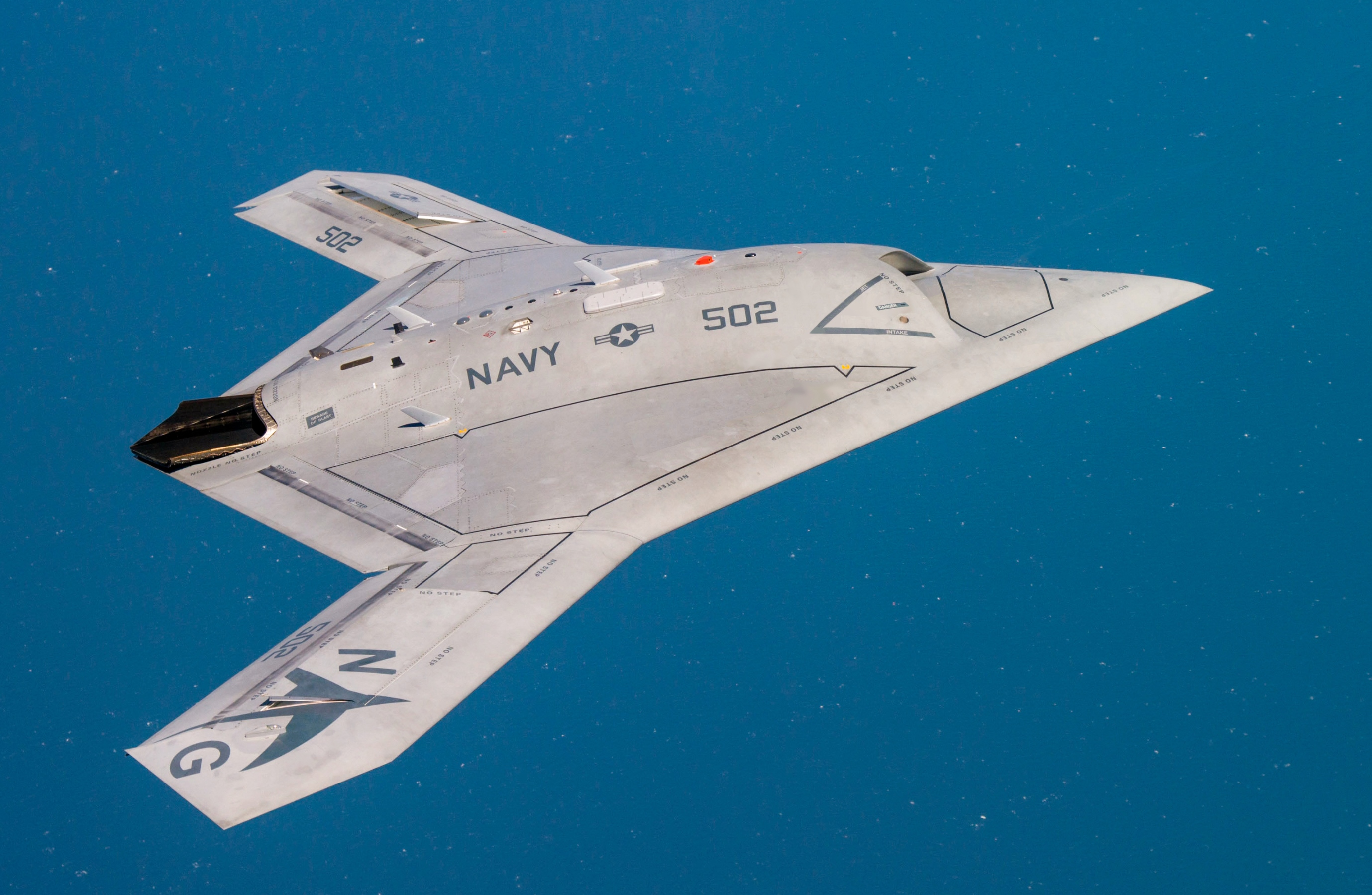
- An X-47B demonstrator over the United States Navy's Atlantic Test Range

General information
- Type: Unmanned combat aerial vehicle technology demonstrator
- National origin: United States
- Manufacturer: Northrop Grumman
- Status: Project cancelled in 2015, prototypes preserved by Northrop Grumman
- Primary user: United States Navy
- Number built: 2

History
- First flight: 4 February 2011
- Developed from: Northrop Grumman X-47A Pegasus

The Northrop Grumman X-47B is a demonstration unmanned combat aerial vehicle (UCAV) designed for aircraft carrier-based operations. Developed by the American defense technology company Northrop Grumman, the X-47 project began under the Defense Advanced Research Project Agency (DARPA) as part of the Joint Unmanned Combat Air Systems (J-UCAS) program, and subsequently became part of the United States Navy's Unmanned Combat Air System Demonstration (UCAS-D) program. The X-47B is a tailless jet-powered blended-wing-body aircraft capable of semi-autonomous operation and aerial refueling.

The X-47B first flew in 2011, and as of 2015, its two active demonstrators had undergone extensive flight and operational integration testing, having successfully performed a series of land- and carrier-based demonstrations. In August 2014, the U.S. Navy announced that it had integrated the X-47B into carrier operations alongside manned aircraft, and by May 2015 the primary test program was declared complete. The X-47B demonstrators were intended to become museum exhibits after completing flight testing, but the Navy later decided to maintain them in flying condition pending further development.

== Design and development ==
=== Origins ===
Video of aerial refueling of an X-47B in April 2015

The U.S. Navy did not commit to practical UCAS efforts until 2000, when it awarded contracts of US$2 million each to Boeing and Northrop Grumman for a 15-month concept-exploration program. Design considerations for a naval UCAV included dealing with the corrosive saltwater environment, deck handling for launch and recovery, command and control system integration, and operation in an aircraft carrier's high-electromagnetic-interference (EMI) environment. The Navy was interested in using UCAVs for reconnaissance, to penetrate protected airspace and identify targets for follow-on attacks. Northrop Grumman's proof-of-concept X-47A Pegasus, which provided the basis for the X-47B, first flew in 2003. The J-UCAS program was terminated in February 2006 following the Quadrennial Defense Review. The US Air Force and Navy proceeded with their own UAV programs. The Navy selected Northrop Grumman's X-47B as its unmanned combat air system demonstrator (UCAS-D) program. To provide realistic testing, the demonstrator was built to be the same size and weight as the projected operational craft, with a full-sized weapons bay capable of carrying existing missiles. The X-47B industry team included subcontractors Lockheed Martin, Pratt & Whitney, GKN Aerospace, Eaton, General Electric, UTC Aerospace Systems, Dell, Honeywell, Moog, Wind River, Parker Aerospace, Sargent Aerospace & Defense, and Rockwell Collins. The X-47B prototype rolled out from United States Air Force Plant 42 in Palmdale, California, on 16 December 2008. Its first flight was planned for November 2009, but the project fell behind schedule. On 29 December 2009, Northrop Grumman oversaw towed taxi tests of the aircraft at the Palmdale facility, with it taxiing under its own power for the first time in January 2010.

=== Flight testing ===
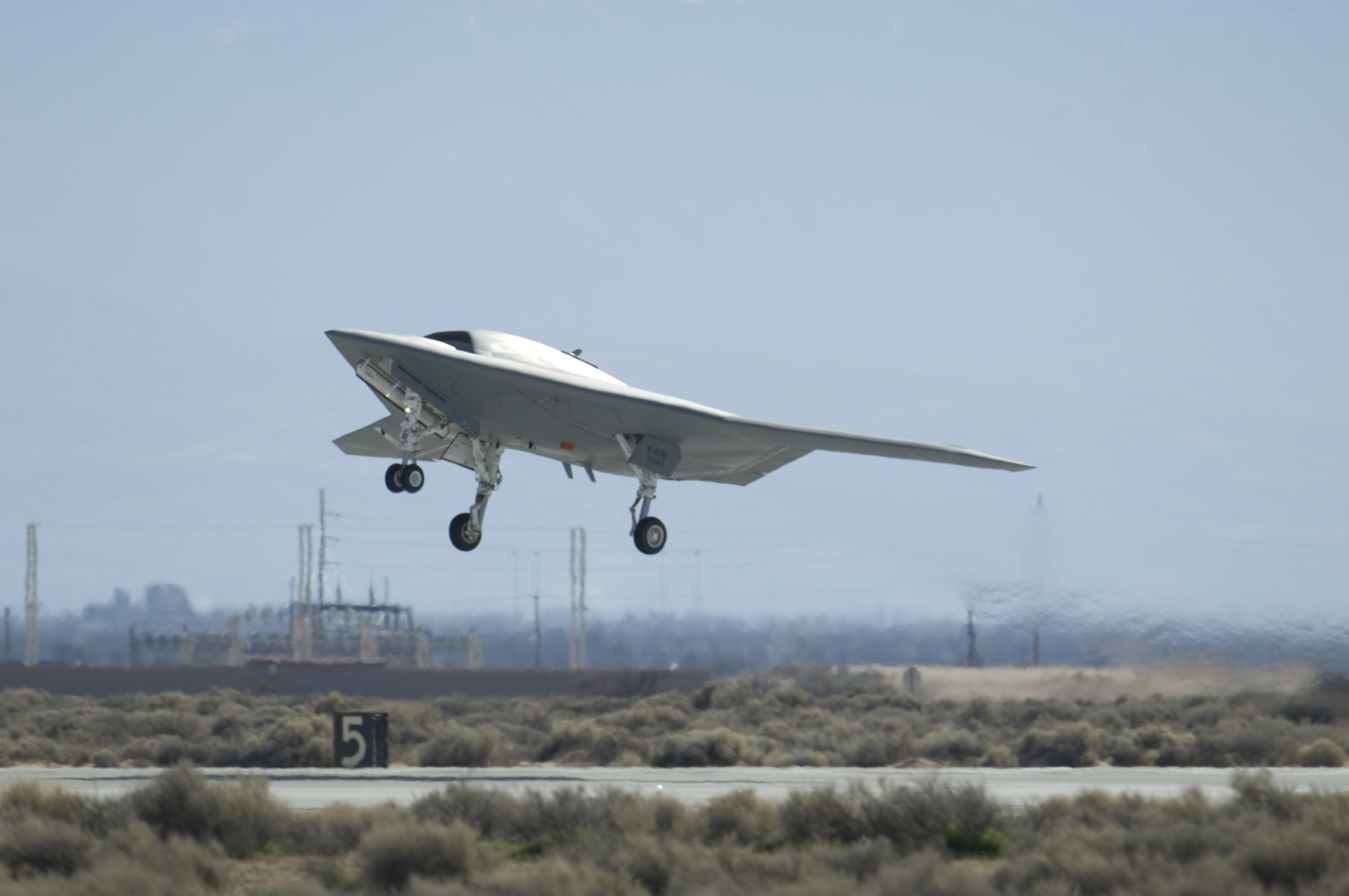
The X-47B's first takeoff at Edwards Air Force Base, California, on 4 February 2011

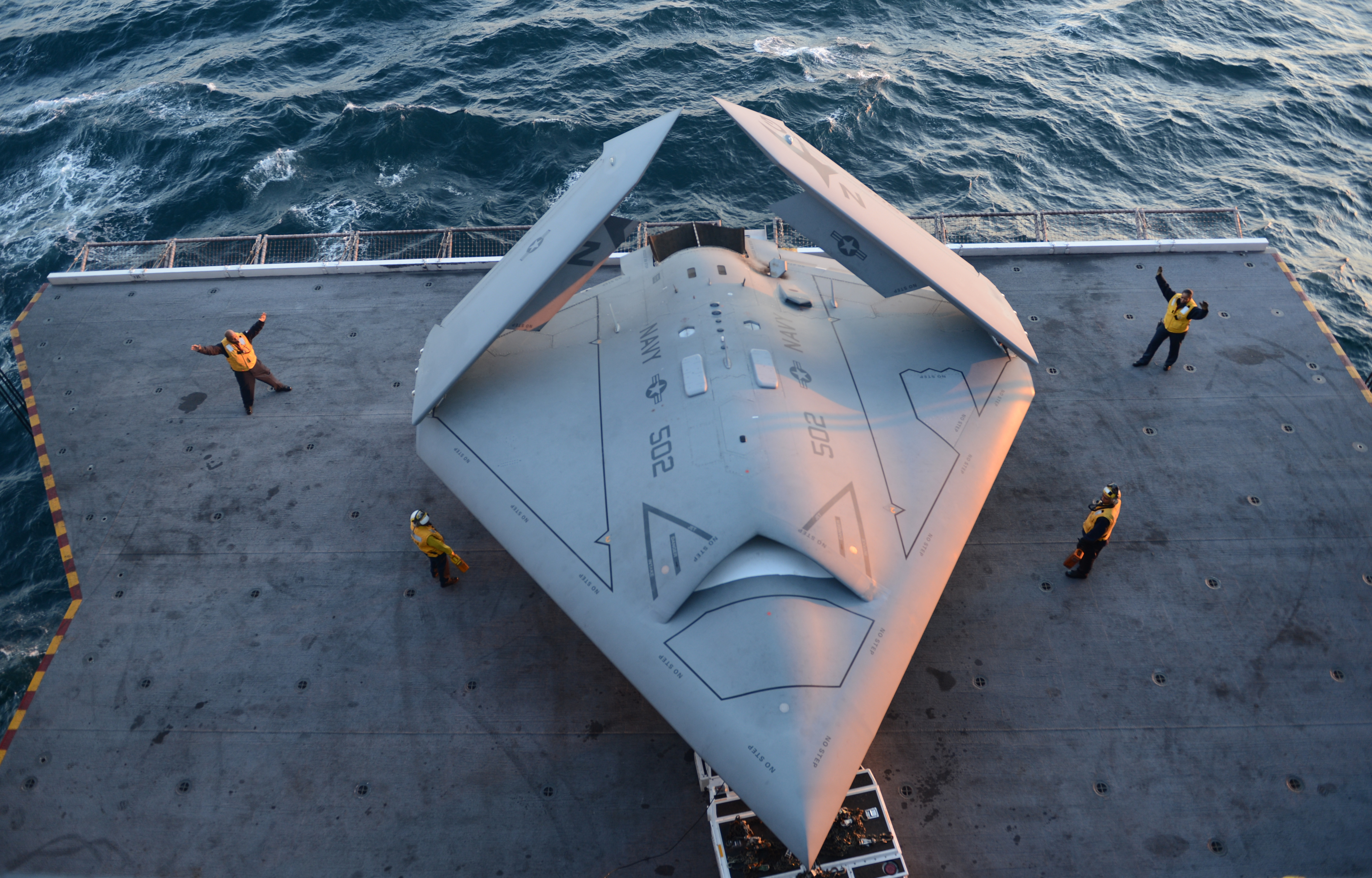
An X-47B with folded wings on the aircraft elevator of George H.W. Bush on 14 May 2013

An X-47B launches from George H.W. Bush on 14 May 2013

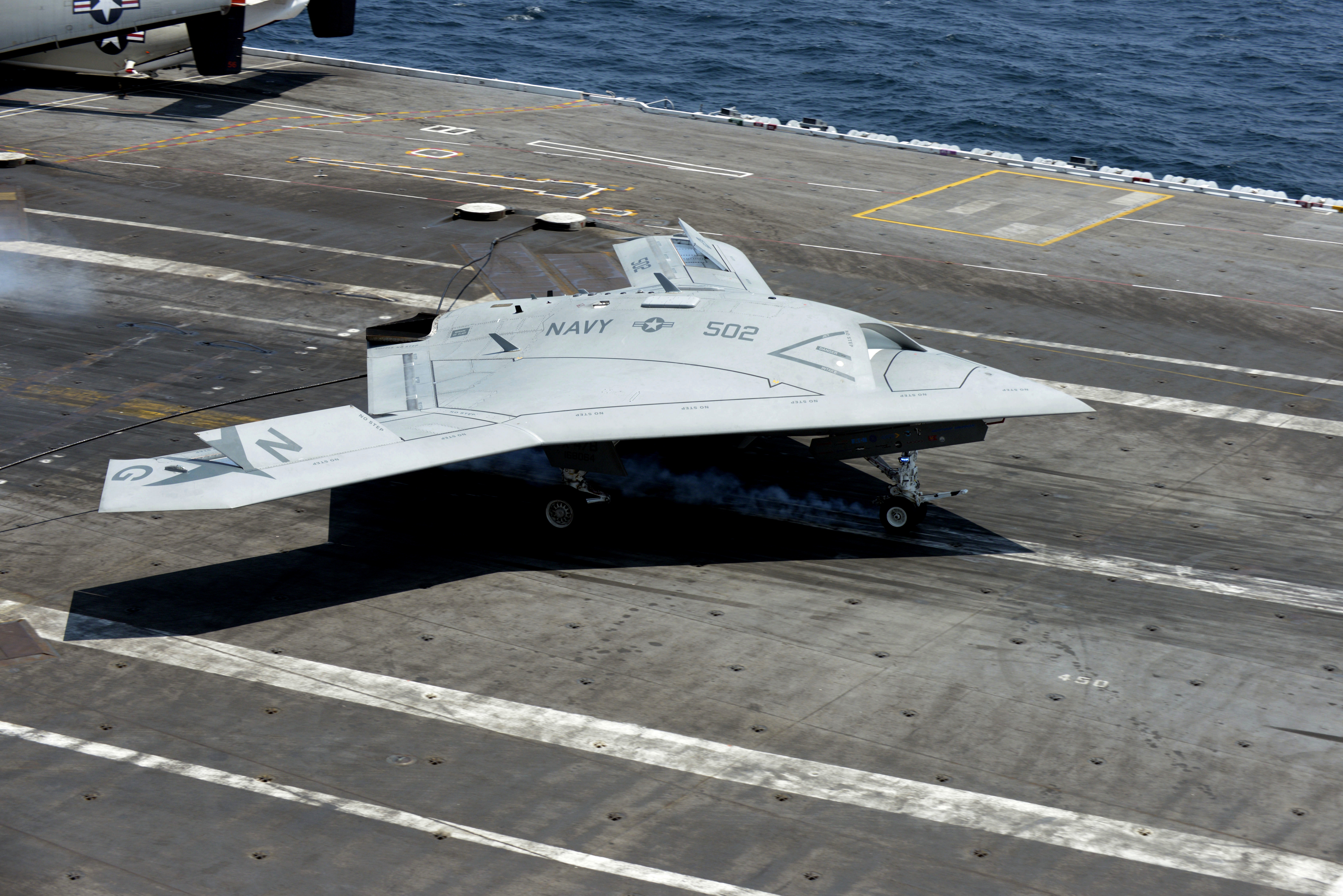
An X-47B makes a successful arrested landing on George H.W. Bush on 10 July 2013

The first flight of the X-47B demonstrator, designated Air Vehicle 1 (AV-1), took place at Edwards Air Force Base, California, on 4 February 2011. It first flew in cruise configuration with its landing gear retracted on 30 September 2011. A second X-47B demonstrator, designated AV-2, conducted its maiden flight at Edwards Air Force Base on 22 November 2011.

The two X-47Bs were initially planned to have a three-year test program with 50 tests at Edwards AFB and NAS Patuxent River, Maryland, culminating in sea trials in 2013. However, they performed so consistently that preliminary tests ended after 16 flights. The Navy decided to have them demonstrate carrier launches and recoveries, as well as autonomous inflight refueling with a probe and drogue. In November 2011, the Navy announced that aerial refuelling equipment and software would be added to one X-47B in 2014 for testing; they also affirmed that the demonstrators would never be armed. In 2012, Northrop Grumman tested a wearable remote control system, designed to allow ground crews to steer the X-47B while on the carrier deck.

In May 2012, AV-1 began high-intensity electromagnetic interference testing at Patuxent River, to test compatibility with planned electronic warfare systems. In June 2012, AV-2 arrived at Patuxent River to begin a series of tests, including arrested landings and catapult launches, to validate its ability to conduct precision approaches to an aircraft carrier. Its first land-based catapult launch was conducted successfully on 29 November 2012.

On 26 November 2012, the X-47B began its carrier-based evaluation aboard the USS Harry S. Truman (CVN-75) at Naval Station Norfolk, Virginia. On 18 December 2012, the X-47B completed its first at-sea test phase; it was remarked to have performed "outstandingly", having proved compatible with the flight deck, hangar bays, and communication systems of an aircraft carrier. With deck testing completed, the X-47B returned to NAS Patuxent River for further tests. On 4 May 2013, it successfully performed an arrested landing on a simulated carrier deck at Patuxent River. The X-47B launched from the USS George H.W. Bush (CVN-77) on 14 May 2013 in the Atlantic Ocean, marking the first time that a UAV was catapulted off an aircraft carrier. On 17 May 2013, another first was achieved when it performed touch-and-go landings and take-offs from George H.W. Bush while underway.

On 10 July 2013, the X-47B launched from Patuxent River and landed on the deck of George H.W. Bush, conducting the first ever arrested landing of a UAV on a carrier at sea. It subsequently completed a second successful arrested landing on George H.W. Bush, but a third attempt was diverted to the Wallops Flight Facility in Virginia due to a technical issue. One of the UAV's three navigational sub-systems failed, which was identified by the other two sub-systems and indicated to the operator, who followed procedures to abort the landing. The Navy stated that the problem's detection demonstrated the X-47B's reliability and ability to operate autonomously.

On 15 July 2013, the second X-47B, designated 501, was forced to abort another planned landing on George H.W. Bush due to technical issues. Officials asserted that the program only required one successful at-sea landing, though testers were aiming for three, while two out of four were achieved. The Navy continued flying the two X-47Bs through 2014, after it was criticised for prematurely retiring them. The Navy subsequently deployed the X-47Bs to carriers for three further test phases between 2013 and 2015, with the intent of demonstrating that UAVs could seamlessly work with a 70-plane carrier air wing.

On 18 September 2013, the X-47B flew the 100th flight for the UCAS-D program. The program objectives were completed in July, which included a total of 16 precision approaches to the carrier flight deck, including five tests of wave-off functions, nine touch-and-go landings, two arrested landings, and three catapult launches. On 10 November 2013, testing continued on board the USS Theodore Roosevelt (CVN-71). During this phase, the X-47B's digitized carrier-controlled environment was tested, such as between the UAV and carrier personnel during launching, recovering, and flight operations. Trials on Theodore Roosevelt in 2014 were intended to test the UAV's ability to swiftly take off, land, and hold in a pattern among manned aircraft without disrupting carrier operations. It also used a jet-blast deflector on deck for the first time, enabling takeoff without impacting operations behind it.

On 10 April 2014, the X-47B performed its first night flight. On 17 August 2014, it took off and landed on Theodore Roosevelt alongside an F/A-18 Hornet, marking the first time a UAV operated in conjunction with manned aircraft aboard an aircraft carrier. The Hornet launched from the carrier, followed by the X-47B. After a brief flight, the X-47B touched down and immediately took off again to verify system behavior. After 24 minutes, the X-47B landed on the flight deck and taxied away to give the Hornet room to land. The demonstration met all test objectives, and marked the X-47B's fifth test period at sea, having completed eight catapult launches from a carrier, 30 touch-and-goes, and seven arrested landings aboard George H.W. Bush and Theodore Roosevelt. Testing was successfully completed on 24 August 2014, with the X-47B completing five catapult launches, four arrestments, and nine touch-and-go landings; nighttime taxi and deckhandling operations were also performed for the first time. It met its objective of performing launches and recoveries at 90-second intervals with manned Hornets. In April 2015, the X-47B successfully conducted the world's first fully autonomous aerial refuelling with an Omega Air KC-707 tanker over the coast of Maryland. This marked the completion of all primary demonstration tasks required of it.

In February 2016, the Navy decided to repurpose the X-47B from a surveillance and strike aircraft into a reconnaissance and aerial refuelling drone with "limited strike capability". The change followed a top-level review and restructuring of the now-defunct unmanned carrier-launched airborne surveillance and strike (UCLASS) project, with later budgets instead funding the MQ-25 Stingray carrier-based aerial refuelling system (CBARS).

=== Costs ===
The project was initially funded under a US$635.8 million contract awarded by the Navy in 2007. By January 2012, the X-47B's total program cost had grown to an estimated $813 million. Government funding for the X-47B UCAS-D program was to run out at the end of September 2013, with the close of the fiscal year. However, in June 2014 the Navy provided an additional $63 million for "post-demonstration" development of the X-47B.

=== End of program ===
In February 2015, the Navy stated that the competition for private tenders for constructing the UCLASS fleet would begin in 2016, with the aircraft expected to enter service in the early 2020s. Reportedly, despite the X-47B's success in test flights, officials were concerned that it would be too costly and insufficiently stealthy for the needs of the UCLASS project. In April 2015, it was reported that the X-47B demonstrators would become museum exhibits upon completing flight testing. In June 2015, United States Secretary of the Navy Ray Mabus stated that the X-47B program should continue but that Northrop-Grumman should not gain an unfair advantage in the competition for the UCLASS contract. In July 2015, the Navy stated that the X-47Bs would remain in flying condition rather than being converted to museum exhibits, allowing for a variety of follow-on evaluations.

In January 2017, the first X-47B departed NAS Patuxent River, Md. for Northrop Grumman's manufacturing plant in Palmdale, Calif. In August 2017, Aviation Week published photos of a modified X-47B as a testbed for Northrop Grumman's MQ-25 bid. On 25 October 2017, the company announced its withdrawal from the MQ-25 competition, saying it would be unable to operate under the terms of the service's request for proposals. A modified Deck Handling System demonstration was planned, but efforts were suspended. One X-47B performed a required upkeep static engine run in spring 2019. The other remained stored in a hangar. The older X-47A Pegasus Air Vehicle was also kept in a covered open air hangar at the Palmdale plant, which the general public cannot enter.

== Awards ==
In March 2014, the X-47B won the 57th Annual Laureate Award for "extraordinary achievements" in aeronautics and propulsion hosted by Aviation Week. On 9 April 2014, the National Aeronautic Association selected Northrop Grumman, the United States Navy, and the X-47B's development team as the joint recipients of the 2013 Collier Trophy for excellence in aeronautic technology.

== Derivative development ==
The Navy used software from the X-47B to demonstrate unmanned aerial refueling capabilities. On 28 August 2013, a Calspan-flown Learjet 25 refueled from a Boeing 707 tanker while flying autonomously as a surrogate aircraft uploaded with the X-47B's technology. The test was to demonstrate that unmanned and optionally manned aircraft can have an automated aerial refueling capability, significantly increasing their range, persistence, and flexibility. Plans to further demonstrate autonomous aerial refueling were reportedly cut in the Navy's fiscal 2014 budget, but the X-47B nonetheless conducted a successful autonomous refuelling demonstration in April 2015.

After the USAF made plans for a next generation bomber following the 2006 Quadrennial Defense Review, Northrop Grumman proposed a variety of derivatives based on the X-47B, informally called "X-47C" by the company. One iteration was a bomber to have a payload of 10,000 pounds (4,500 kg) of bombs, significantly exceeding that of the X-47A. Although Northrop Grumman estimated that the X-47C could enter service in 2018, the NGB program was shelved in 2010.

== Variants ==
X-47A

Original proof-of-concept prototype with a 27.8-foot (8.5 m) wingspan, first flown in 2003.

X-47B

Demonstrator aircraft with a 62-foot (19 m) wingspan, first flown in 2011.

X-47C

Proposed larger version intended for the Navy's UCLASS project or as an Air Force strategic bomber.

== Specifications (X-47B) ==
Plan diagram of the Northrop Grumman X-47B, with a human to scale

Data from

General characteristics

- Crew: None aboard (semi-autonomous operation)
- Length: 38 ft 2 in (11.63 m)
- Wingspan: 62.1 ft (18.9 m) extended; 30.9 ft (9.4 m) folded
- Height: 10 ft 5 in (3.10 m)
- Wing area: 953.6 sq ft (88.59 m^{2})
- Empty weight: 28,837 lb (13,080 kg) zero fuel weight
- Max takeoff weight: 44,501 lb (20,185 kg)
- Powerplant: 1 × Pratt & Whitney F100-220U turbofan

Performance

- Range: 2,400 mi (3,900 km, 2,100 nmi)
- Service ceiling: 42,000 ft (12,800 m)
- Cruise speed: Mach 0.9+ / 690 mph (high subsonic)

Armament

- 2 weapon bays, providing for up to 4,500 lb (2,000 kg) of ordnance

Avionics

- Provisions for EO/IR/SAR/ISAR/GMTI/MMTI/ESM

== See also ==
Related development

- Northrop Grumman X-47A Pegasus

Aircraft of comparable role, configuration, and era

- BAE Taranis
- Boeing MQ-25 Stingray
- Boeing X-45
- CASC CH-7
- Dassault nEUROn
- EADS Barracuda
- General Atomics Avenger
- Lockheed Martin Polecat
- McDonnell Douglas X-36
- Northrop Grumman RQ-180
- Mikoyan Skat
- Sukhoi Okhotnik

Related lists

- List of experimental aircraft
- List of tailless aircraft
- List of UAVs
