= Future Aircraft Technology Enhancements =

AFRL and DARPA program to develop new aircraft technologies

The Future Aircraft Technology Enhancements (FATE) program is a program to develop new technologies. It is being run by the Air Force Research Laboratory (AFRL) and the Defense Advanced Research Projects Agency (DARPA). The X-39 aircraft designation is reserved for use with FATE by the USAF.
