= Unmanned Combat Air System Demonstrator program =

The United States Navy Unmanned Combat Air System Demonstrator (UCAS-D) program included:

- Northrop Grumman X-47A Pegasus
- Northrop Grumman X-47B

The X-47B Unmanned Combat Air System demonstrator launches from the aircraft carrier USS George H.W. Bush (CVN 77) on May 14, 2013.

The UCAS-D program was created to demonstrate the feasibility of operating an unmanned aircraft from an aircraft carrier. Technology and operational procedures developed through the program and the X-47B demonstrator informed the design of a future operational carrier-based unmanned aircraft under the Unmanned Carrier-Launched Surveillance and Strike (UCLASS) program. After debate over whether UCLASS should prioritize strike or surveillance, the Pentagon restructured the program into the Carrier-Based Aerial Refueling System (CBARS). The CBARS program aimed to produce an unmanned aerial vehicle for aerial refueling to extend the range of manned fighters.

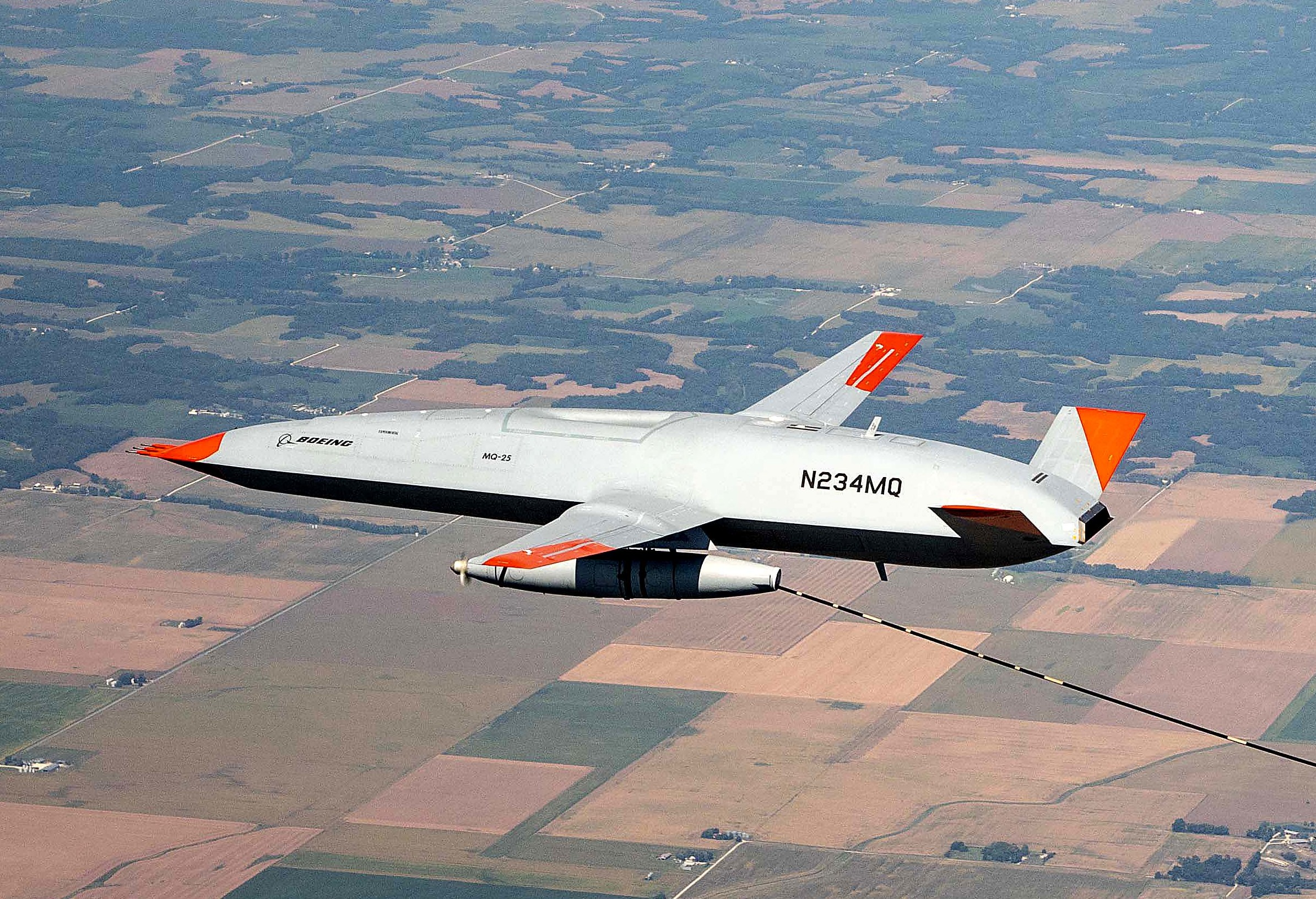
MQ-25 Stingray during testing

This project led to the development of the carrier-based aerial refueling drone, the Boeing MQ-25 Stingray.

== See also ==
- UCLASS
- Drone carrier
