= Joint Unmanned Combat Air Systems =

US defense program on air vehicles

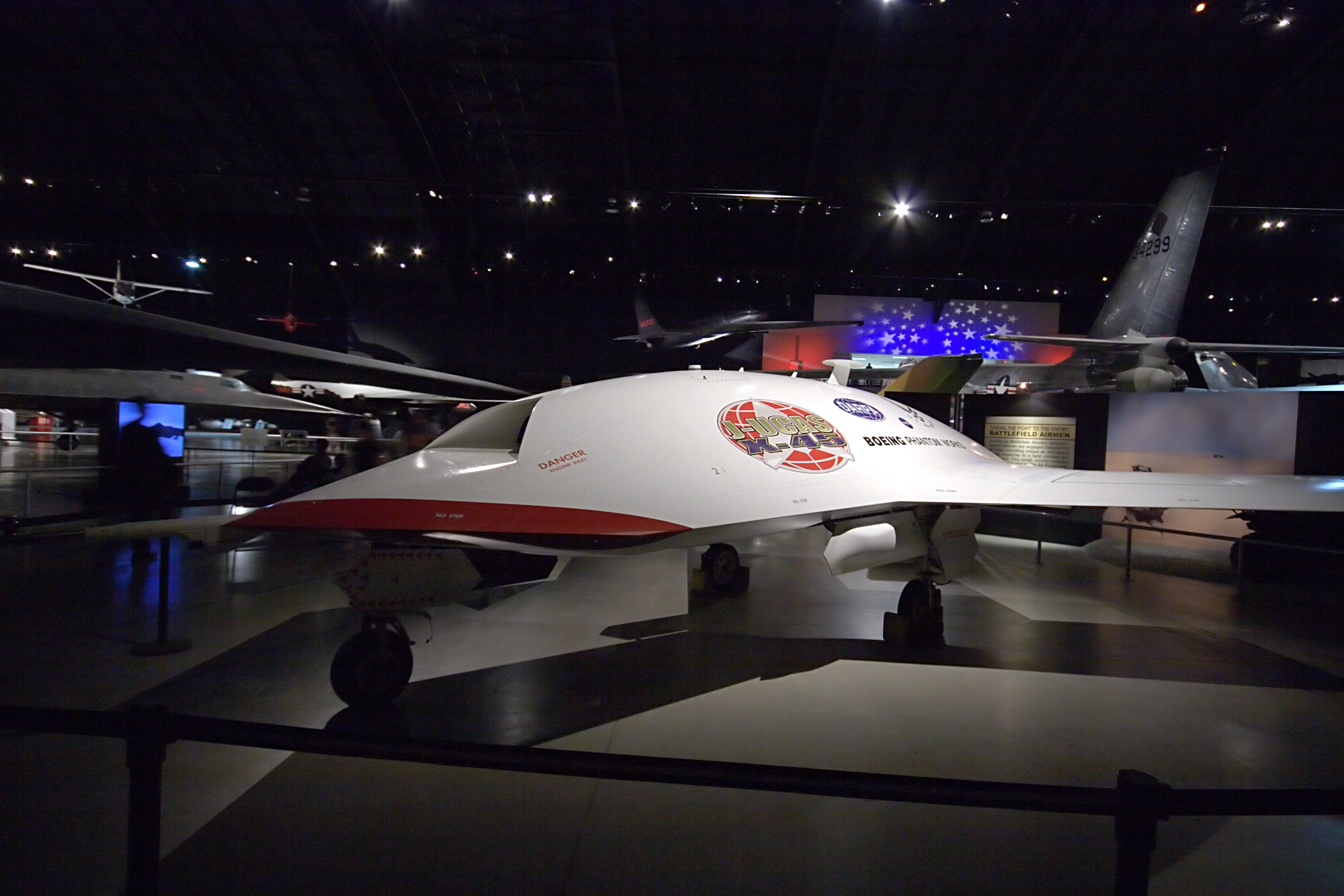
Boeing X-45 at the National Museum of the United States Air Force

Joint Unmanned Combat Air Systems, or J-UCAS, was the name for the joint U.S. Navy and U.S. Air Force unmanned combat air vehicle procurement project. Originally two separate projects of the U.S. Air Force and Navy respectively: UCAV and UCAV-N; both programs merged in 2003. The two vehicles involved in J-UCAS were the Boeing X-45 and Northrop Grumman X-47A Pegasus, originally part of UCAV and UCAV-N respectively. J-UCAS was managed by the Defense Advanced Research Projects Agency. In the 2006 Quadrennial Defense Review, it was stated that the J-UCAS program would be terminated and instead a new long-range strategic bomber program, Next-Generation Bomber, for the Air Force would launch. The program was revitalized into a Navy-only program named UCAS-D.

The goal of the J-UCAS effort was to develop a "versatile combat network in which air and ground components are nodes that can be changed over time to support a wide range of potential missions."

== History ==
The Air Force UCAV and Navy UCAV-N programs, both managed by DARPA, merged to form the Joint Unmanned Combat Air Systems, and is still managed by DARPA. The Boeing X-45A and Northrop Grumman X-47A Pegasus were selected for the program and first flew on 22 May 2002 and 23 February 2003 respectively.

DARPA normally performs proof-of-concept demonstrations and then hands follow-on programs on to interested military services. Apparently this arrangement was driven from the office of the secretary of defense, the idea being that DARPA would be able to keep the development effort on track until advanced demonstrators were available, and then the program would gain momentum that to keep on going. The long list of US military UAV programs that have been bungled and dropped after much expense and effort, with some of them like the Hunter ending up effectively reaching operational service in spite of it, provoked the decision.

The candidates for the J-UCAS program included developments of the follow-ons to the Boeing X-45A and the Northrop Grumman X-47A Pegasus. DARPA and Boeing had been working on the "X-45B", a scaled-up X-45A that was seen as the prototype for an operational machine that would reach service in 2008, and would carry a 1,590 kilogram (3,500 pound) warload to a combat radius of 1,665 kilometers (900 nautical miles). Two were to be built, but before any metal could be bent for the two X-45B prototypes planned, the Air Force redirected the effort to an even more capable machine, the "X-45C".

The X-45C, was envisioned to be a flying wing powered by a single F404-GE-102D turbofan engine. Specs included:

The payload and range specifications are as defined by J-UCAS requirements. The operational radius specification is for a strike to a predefined target and back home again. A secondary range specification dictates a two-hour loiter capability at a radius of 1,850 kilometers (1,000 NMI).

In the summer of 2003, Northrop Grumman formed an alliance with Lockheed Martin as a subcontractor to help develop the "X-47B", a follow-on to the X-47 that would compete against Boeing efforts. The alliance, which repeats the successful teamup that won the F-35 Joint Strike Fighter effort, is focused on building a modular stealthy UCAV that could be adapted to a wide range of missions. It would have a speed of Mach 0.8 at 10,670 meters (35,000 feet) and endurance of up to 12 hours.

The X-47B was originally planned to have its first flight by 2007 alongside the X-45C and introduction of a "Common Operating System."

The goal of the J-UCAS effort is to develop a "versatile combat network in which air and ground components are nodes that can be changed over time to support a wide range of potential missions."

The USAF has envisioned an operational UCAV as being stored in broken-down form inside a container that can be airlifted, with the UCAV having a specified "shelf life" of 20 years. It would be removed from the container every few years for inspections and could be checked with an electronic test system. The Air Force would also like to use an operational UCAV as the basis of a "penetrating jammer" platform that would penetrate enemy airspace to blind hostile radars. It would replace the Grumman EA-6B Prowler manned electronic warfare aircraft in this role. A reconnaissance payload is also being considered. However, the Air Force wants to focus on the strike role first.

Over the long term, the Air Force is interested in using a UCAV as a platform to carry directed-energy weapons, initially a "high power microwave (HPM)" weapon to fry adversary electronic systems. The HPM weapon would be "fired" out an aperture on the front of the aircraft, with electronic steering used to direct the beam over an arc covering about 45 degrees to either side of the UCAV. The HPM weapon could be followed by a high power laser weapon.

The Navy is interested in many of the features on the Air Force wish list, though the Navy has put reconnaissance and jamming at the top of the list and strike at the bottom, and seems to be indifferent to the containerization concept. Of course, a navalized UCAV would have a stronger airframe and landing gear for carrier takeoffs and landings; an arresting hook; and avionics for automated carrier approach and landing, along with a "relative navigation system" that will tell the UCAV where it is relative to the carrier.

A big concern of program officials is to ensure that widespread use of UCAVs does not increase the number of friendly fire incidents or collateral damage to civilian targets. The evaluation program will investigate this matter in detail. One of the concepts now being given considerable thought is use of a manned aircraft, such as an F-15E Strike Eagle, as a UCAV "mothership", with the weapons systems officer in the back seat directing one or more UCAVs over high-speed datalink.
