= Northrop Grumman X-47A Pegasus =

Demonstration vehicle in the US Navy

X-47A Pegasus
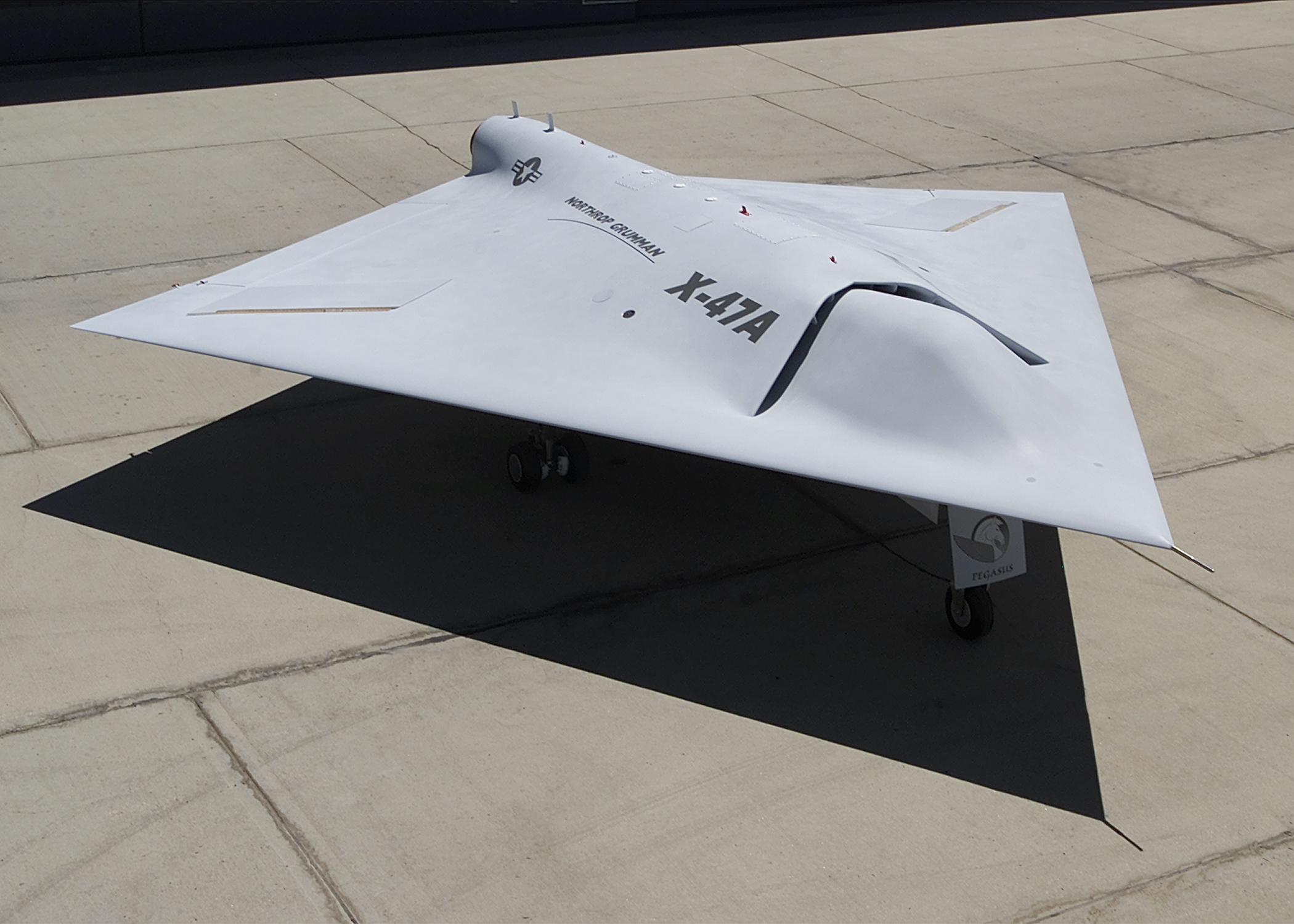
- X-47A roll out

General information
- Type: Unmanned combat aerial vehicle Technology demonstration
- Manufacturer: Northrop Grumman
- Primary user: United States Navy

History
- First flight: 23 February 2003
- Developed into: Northrop Grumman X-47B

The Northrop Grumman X-47 is a demonstration unmanned combat aerial vehicle. The X-47 began as part of DARPA's J-UCAS program, and is now part of the United States Navy's UCAS-D program to create a carrier-based unmanned aircraft. Unlike the Boeing X-45, initial Pegasus development was company-funded. The original vehicle carries the designation X-47A Pegasus, while the follow-on naval version is designated X-47B.

== Design and development ==
The US Navy did not commit to practical UCAV efforts until mid-2000, when the service awarded contracts of US$2 million each to Boeing and Northrop Grumman for a 15-month concept-exploration program.

Design considerations for a naval UCAV included dealing with the corrosive salt-water environment, deck handling for launch and recovery, integration with command and control systems, and operation in a carrier's high electromagnetic interference environment. The Navy was also interested in using their UCAVs for reconnaissance missions, penetrating protected airspace to identify targets for the attack waves.

The Navy went on to give Northrop Grumman a contract for a naval UCAV demonstrator with the designation of "X-47A Pegasus", in early 2001. The proof-of-concept X-47A vehicle was built under contract by Burt Rutan's Scaled Composites at the Mojave Spaceport. The Pegasus demonstrator looks like a simple black arrowhead with no vertical tailplane. It has a leading edge sweep of 55 degrees and a trailing edge sweep of 35 degrees. The demonstrator has retractable tricycle landing gear, with a one-wheel nose gear and dual-wheel main gear, and has six control surfaces, including two elevons and four "inlaids". The inlaids are small flap structures mounted on the top and bottom of the wing forward of the wingtips.

The X-47A is powered by a single Pratt & Whitney Canada JT15D-5C small high-bypass turbofan engine with 3,190 lbf (14.2 kN) thrust. This engine is currently in use with operational aircraft such as the Aermacchi S-211 trainer. The engine is mounted on the demonstrator's back, with the inlet on top behind the nose. The inlet duct has a serpentine diffuser to prevent radar reflections off the engine fan. However, to keep costs low, the engine exhaust is a simple cylindrical tailpipe, with no provisions for reducing radar or infrared signature.

The X-47A's airframe is built of composite materials, with construction subcontracted out to Burt Rutan's Scaled Composites company, which had the expertise and tooling to do the job inexpensively. The airframe consists of four main assemblies, split down the middle with two assemblies on top and two on bottom.

The X-47A was rolled out on 30 July 2001 and performed its first flight on 23 February 2003 at the Naval Air Warfare Center at China Lake, California. The flight test program did not involve weapons delivery, but Pegasus does have two weapons bays, one on each side of the engine, that may be each loaded with a single 500 pound (225 kg) dummy bomb to simulate operational flight loads. The Pegasus was also used to evaluate technologies for carrier deck landings, though the demonstrator did not have a tailhook. Other issues related to carrier operations involve adding deck tie-downs without compromising stealth characteristics, and designing access panels so that they would not be blown around or damaged by strong winds blowing across the carrier deck. The J-UCAS program was terminated in February 2006 following the US military's Quadrennial Defense Review. The US Air Force and US Navy proceeded with their own UAV programs. The Navy selected Northrop Grumman's X-47B as its Unmanned Combat Air System Demonstrator (UCAS-D) program.

== Variants ==
- X-47A
- X-47B
- X-47C: Proposed larger version with a payload of 10,000 lb (4,500 kg) and a wingspan of 172 ft (52.4 m).

== Specifications (X-47A) ==
Plan diagram of the Northrop Grumman X-47A Pegasus

General characteristics

- Length: 27.9 ft (8.5 m)
- Wingspan: 27.8 ft (8.5 m)
- Height: 6 ft 1 in (1.85 m)
- Wing area: 387.29 sq ft (35.980 m^{2})
- Empty weight: 3,836 lb (1,740 kg)
- Gross weight: 4,877 lb (2,212 kg)
- Max takeoff weight: 5,903 lb (2,678 kg)
- Powerplant: 1 × Pratt & Whitney Canada JT15D-5C turbofan, 3,190 lbf (14.2 kN) thrust

Performance

- Range: 1,700 mi (2,800 km, 1,500 nmi)
- Service ceiling: 40,000 ft (12,000 m)
- Thrust/weight: 0.65

== See also ==
Related development

- Northrop Grumman X-47B

Aircraft of comparable role, configuration, and era

- Boeing X-45
- MiG Skat

Related lists

- List of experimental aircraft
