= List of U.S. DoD aircraft designations =

This is a table of 1962 United States Tri-Service aircraft designation system with selected letter sequences and number. Two previous USAF/AAF/AAC number series are included due to their impact and partial incorporation into the tri-service system (A, B, C, F and O reset to one, but # carryover existed).

The United States department of Defense was established in 1949, the old name Department of War was retired in 1947. In 1962 separate aircraft naming schemes were unified, but out of convenience many numbers carried over. For example, the P-38 Lightning, which also was used as the F-4 and F-5 for reconnaissance and FO in the Navy, became the F-38. In 1948 the Pursuit series designated P, switched to being called F for fighter, which was continued in 1962. Much later the B series were restarted back at 1, but numbered additions began being made where the old C left off in the 21st century.

Table key
white	1962 Tri-Service designations and carried-over 1924 Air Force designations
yellow	1924 Air Force designations (select sequences only)
blue	1922 Navy designations (select designations only)
green	1956 Army designations (select designations only)
~~struck~~	Designation skipped
italics	Non-sequential designation
(parentheses)	No plain designation exists, only designations with mission modifiers and/or status prefixes (most common designation shown)
–	Designation not assigned
^{A}	1962 redesignations from the 1956 Army system
^{AF}	1962 redesignations from the 1924 Air Force system
^{N}	1962 redesignations from the 1922 Navy system
^{R}	Designation retired prior to the founding of the Department of Defense
*	Unconfirmed
†	Reserved but not taken up
‡	Unofficial

== Table of designations ==
Table of DoD aircraft designations: Basic Mission and Vehicle Type
Post 1962 Series with selected Pre-1962 USAF/AAF/AAC number series
#	A	A Navy pre-1962	B	B 1930–62	C 1962– present	C 1924– present	D (Note: The "D" sequence is not applied to aircraft, but rather to ground control stations for UAVs. However, it is included here because it is part of the same system that designates aircraft.)	E	F 1962– present	F Navy pre-1962	F (P) (Note: Fighter aircraft were originally designated as "P" for pursuit, but this was changed to "F" for fighter in 1947.) 1924–62	G	H 1962– present	H Army pre-1962	H (R) (Note: Helicopters were originally designated as "R" for rotorcraft, but this was changed to "H" for helicopter in 1947.) 1941– present	L	O	P	Q	R	R (F) (Note: Reconnaissance aircraft were originally designated as "F" for photo, but this was changed to "R" for reconnaissance in 1947.) 1930–62	S Anti- submarine	S Space- plane	SR (Note: There are no sequential "RS" or "SR" designations. These sequences are based on the pre-1962 bomber sequence.)	RS 1960–62	T (Note: The original "T" sequence was created by merging the pre-1948 "AT" advanced trainer, "BT" basic trainer, and "PT" primary trainer sequences. All designations before T-28 are redesignations from those sequences. Many designations are missing but not considered skipped because they cannot be accurately retroactively applied to any one aircraft.) 1948– present	T 1962	T 1990– present	U	V	X (S) (Note: Experimental aircraft were originally designated as "S" for supersonic/special test, but this was changed to "X" for experimental in 1948.)	Z
1	A-1^{N} (OA-1K)	AD	B-1	(XB-1)^{R}	C-1^{N}	C-1^{R}	(MD-1)	E-1^{N}	F-1 / E/F^{N}	FJ	P-1^{R}	(TG-1)	(AH-1 / J/T/W / Z) (UH-1 / N / Y)^{A, AF}	HU-1	(XR-1)^{R}	(YAL-1)	O-1^{AF, N}	~~P-1~~	(MQ-1 / C)	(TR-1)	F-1^{R}	~~S-1~~	(XS-1)	–	–	–	T-1^{N}	T-1	U-1^{N}	(OV-1)^{A}	(XS-1)^{R} X-1	(SZ-1)^{N}
2	A-2^{N}	AJ	B-2	B-2^{R}	C-2	C-2^{R}	(RD-2)	E-2^{N}	F-2^{N}	F2H	P-2^{R}	(TG-2)	(SH-2 / G)^{N}	–	(XR-2)^{R}	–	O-2	P-2^{N}	(RQ-2)	–	F-2^{R}	S-2^{N}	–	–	–	–	T-2^{N}	~~T-2~~	U-2	(CV-2)^{A}	(XS-2)^{R} X-2	(EZ-2)
3	A-3^{N}	A3D	–	B-3^{R}	(VC-3)^{N}	C-3^{R}	(MD-3)	E-3	F-3^{N}	F3H	P-3^{R}	(TG-3)	(SH-3)^{N} (CH-3C/E)	–	(XR-3)^{R}	–	(YO-3)	P-3^{N} (EP-3) (WP-3D)	(RQ-3)	–	F-3^{R}	S-3	–	–	–	–	–	T-3	U-3^{AF}	(XV-3)	(XS-3)^{R} X-3	(MZ-3)
4	A-4^{N}	A4D	–	B-4^{R}	(TC-4)^{N}	C-4^{R}	(MD-4)	E-4	F-4^{AF, N}	F4H	(XP-4 (1926))^{R} (XP-4 (1927))^{R}	(TG-4)	(YOH-4)^{A}	(YHO-4)	R-4^{R}	–	(ZO-4)*	(QP-4)^{N}	(RQ-4) (MQ-4C)	–	F-4^{R}	–	–	–	–	–	–	~~T-4~~	U-4^{AF}	(XV-4)^{A}	(XS-4)^{R} X-4	(RZ-4)
5	A-5^{N}	A3J	–	B-5^{R}	C-5	C-5^{R}	(ZMD-5)	(YE-5)	F-5 / G	–	P-5^{R}	(TG-5)	(YOH-5)^{A}	(YHO-5)	R-5^{R} H-5	–	O-5	P-5^{N}	(RQ-5)	–	F-5^{R}	–	–	–	–	–	–	~~T-5~~	U-5	(XV-5)^{A}	(XS-5)^{R} X-5	–
6	A-6^{N} (EA-6B)	A2F	–	B-6^{R}	(VC-6)	C-6^{R}	–	E-6	F-6^{N}	F4D	P-6^{R}	(TG-6)	(AH-6) (MH-6) (OH-6)^{A}	(YHO-6)	R-6^{R} H-6	–	(RO-6)	~~P-6~~	(RQ-6)	–	F-6^{R}	–	–	–	–	T-6^{R}	–	T-6	U-6^{AF}	(XV-6)	X-6	–
7	A-7 / F	–	–	(Y1B-7)^{R}	C-7 (RC-7)	C-7^{R}	–	E-7‡	(YF-7)^{N}	F2Y	(XP-7)^{R}	(TG-7)	–	–	(XR-7)^{R}	–	–	P-7	(RQ-7)	–	F-7^{R}	–	–	–	–	T-7^{R}	–	T-7	U-7^{AF}	(CV-7)^{A}	X-7	–
8	A-8*	–	–	(XB-8)^{R}	C-8	(XC-8)^{R}	–	E-8	F-8^{N}	F8U	(XP-8)^{R}	(RG-8)	–	–	(XR-8)^{R}	–	–	P-8	(MQ-8 / C)	–	F-8^{R}	–	–	–	–	–	–	–	U-8^{AF}	(XV-8) (AV-8 / B)	X-8	–
9	(YA-9)	–	–	(YB-9)^{R}	C-9	C-9^{R}	–	E-9	F-9 / F/J^{N}	F9F / -6/8	(XP-9)^{R}	(TG-9)	–	–	(XR-9)^{R} (XH-9)	–	–	P-9	(MQ-9)	–	F-9^{R}	–	–	–	–	–	–	–	U-9^{AF}	(XV-9)	X-9	–
10	A-10	–	–	B-10^{R}	C-10 (KC-10)	(XC-10)^{R}	–	E-10	F-10^{N}	F3D	(XP-10)^{R}	(TG-10)	–	–	(XR-10)^{R} (XH-10)	–	–	–	(CQ-10)	–	F-10^{R}	–	–	–	–	–	–	–	U-10^{AF}	(OV-10)	X-10	–
11	~~A-11~~	–	–	(YB-11)^{R}	(VC-11)	C-11^{R}	–	E-11	F-11^{N}	F11F	P-11^{R}	(TG-11)	–	–	(XR-11)^{R} (XH-11)	–	–	–	(RQ-11)	–	(XF-11)^{R} (XR-11)	–	–	–	–	T-11^{R}	–	–	U-11^{N}	(XV-11)	X-11	–
12	A-12	–	–	B-12^{R}	C-12 (RC-12)	(Y1C-12)^{R}	–	–	(YF-12 / C)	–	P-12^{R}	(TG-12)	–	–	R-12^{R} (YH-12)	–	–	–	(RQ-12)	–	(XF-12)^{R} (XR-12)	–	–	–	–	–	–	–	~~U-12~~	(XFV-12) (OV-12)	X-12	–
13 (Note: Due to superstitions associating the number 13 with bad luck, 13 is often skipped in US designation sequences.)	~~A-13~~	–	–	(YB-13)^{R}	~~C-13~~	~~C-13~~	–	–	~~F-13~~	–	(XP-13)^{R}	~~G-13~~	–	–	(YR-13)^{R} H-13 / J	–	–	–	~~Q-13~~	–	F-13^{R}	–	–	–	–	T-13A^{R} T-13B/D^{R}	–	–	~~U-13~~	~~V-13~~	X-13	–
14	A-14†	–	–	(XB-14)^{R}	(YC-14)	C-14^{R}	–	–	F-14	–	(XP-14)^{R}	(TG-14)	–	–	(XR-14)^{R}	–	–	–	(RQ-14)	–	F-14^{R}	–	–	–	–	–	–	–	~~U-14~~	~~V-14~~	X-14	–
15	–	–	–	(XB-15)^{R}	(YC-15)	C-15^{R}	–	–	F-15 / E / EX / J (NF-15B)	–	(XP-15)^{R}	(TG-15A / B)	–	–	(XR-15)^{R} (XH-15)	–	–	–	(RQ-15)	–	F-15^{R}	–	–	–	–	–	–	–	~~U-15~~	(XV-15)	X-15	–
16	–	–	–	(XB-16)^{R}	~~C-16~~	(YC-16)^{R}	–	–	F-16 / XL (NF-16D)	–	P-16^{R}	(TG-16)	–	–	(XR-16)^{R} (YH-16)	–	–	–	(RQ-16)	–	(XR-16)	–	–	–	–	–	–	–	(HU-16)^{AF, N}	(AV-16)‡	X-16	–
17	–	–	–	B-17	C-17	(Y1C-17)^{R}	–	–	(YF-17)	–	(XP-17)^{R}	–	–	–	(XH-17)	–	–	–	(MQ-17)	–	–	–	–	–	–	T-17^{R}	–	–	U-17	~~V-17~~	X-17	–
18	F/A-18 / E/F (EA-18G)	–	–	B-18^{R}	C-18	(Y1C-18)^{R}	–	–	F/A-18 / E/F	–	(XP-18)^{R}	–	–	–	(XH-18)	–	–	–	(YMQ-18)	–	–	–	–	–	–	–	–	–	U-18^{AF}	(UV-18)	X-18	–
19	–	–	–	(XB-19)^{R}	C-19	(Y1C-19)^{R}	–	–	~~F-19~~	–	(XP-19)^{R}	–	–	–	H-19	–	–	–	(MQ-19)	–	–	–	–	–	–	T-19^{R}	–	–	U-19^{AF}	~~V-19~~	X-19	–
20	–	–	–	(Y1B-20)^{R} B-20	C-20A/D; C-20F/J	(YC-20)^{R}	–	–	F-20	–	(YP-20)^{R}	–	–	–	(XH-20)	–	–	–	(MQ-20) (RQ-20)	–	–	–	–	–	–	–	–	–	U-20^{AF}	(UV-20)	X-20	–
21	–	–	B-21	(XB-21)^{R}	C-21	C-21^{R}	–	–	F-21	–	(XP-21)^{R}	–	–	–	H-21	–	–	–	(RQ-21)	–	–	–	–	–	–	–	–	–	U-21	~~V-21~~	X-21	–
22	F/A-22	–	(FB-22)	(XB-22)^{R}	C-22	C-22^{R}	–	–	(YF-22); F-22	–	(XP-22)^{R}	–	–	–	(YH-22)	–	–	–	(RQ-22)	–	–	–	–	–	–	–	–	–	(QU-22)	V-22	X-22	–
23	–	–	–	B-23^{R}	C-23	C-23^{R}	–	–	(YF-23)	–	(YP-23)^{R}	–	–	–	H-23	–	–	–	(RQ-23)	–	–	–	–	–	–	–	–	–	(AU-23)	(UV-23)	X-23‡	–
24	–	–	–	B-24	(EC-24)	(Y1C-24)^{R}	–	–	(YF-24)*	–	(YP-24)^{R} F-24	–	–	–	(YH-24)	–	–	–	(CQ-24)	–	–	–	–	–	–	–	–	–	(AU-24)	(XV-24)	X-24 / C	–
25	–	–	–	B-25	(VC-25)	(Y1C-25)^{R}	–	–	–	–	(Y1P-25)^{R}	–	–	–	H-25	–	–	–	(MQ-25)	–	–	–	–	–	–	–	–	–	U-25 (HU-25)	(XV-25)	X-25	–
26	A-26	–	–	B-26^{R} B-26	C-26	C-26^{R}	–	–	–	–	P-26^{R}	–	–	–	(XH-26)	–	–	–	(RQ-26)	–	–	–	–	–	–	–	–	–	U-26	–	X-26	–
27	–	–	–	(XB-27)^{R}	C-27 / J	C-27^{R}	–	–	–	–	(YP-27)^{R}	–	–	–	(XH-27)	–	–	–	(MQ-27)	–	–	–	–	–	–	–	–	–	U-27	–	X-27	–
28	–	–	–	(XB-28)^{R}	C-28	C-28^{R}	–	–	–	–	(Y1P-28)^{R}	–	–	–	(XH-28)	–	–	–	(RQ-28)	–	–	–	–	–	–	T-28	–	–	U-28	–	X-28	–
29	A-29	–	–	B-29 / D (KB-29)	C-29	C-29^{R}	–	–	–	–	P-29^{R}	–	–	–	(XH-29)	–	–	–	(RQ-29)	–	–	–	–	–	–	T-29	–	–	–	–	X-29	–
30	–	–	–	(XB-30)^{R}	~~C-30~~	(YC-30)^{R}	–	–	–	–	P-30^{R}	–	–	–	(YH-30)	–	–	–	(RQ-30)	–	–	–	–	–	–	(XT-30)	–	–	–	–	X-30	–
31	–	–	–	(XB-31)^{R}	C-31	(XC-31)^{R}	–	–	–	–	(XP-31)^{R}	–	–	–	(VH-31)	–	–	–	–	–	–	–	–	–	–	T-31	–	–	–	–	X-31	–
32	–	–	–	B-32^{R}	C-32	C-32^{R}	–	–	–	–	(XP-32)^{R}	–	–	–	(YH-32)	–	–	–	–	–	–	–	–	–	–	(YT-32)	–	–	–	–	X-32	–
33	–	–	–	(XB-33)^{R}	C-33	C-33^{R}	–	–	–	–	(XP-33)^{R}	–	–	–	(XH-33)	–	–	–	–	–	–	–	–	–	–	T-33 (NT-33A)	–	–	–	–	X-33	–
34	–	–	–	B-34^{R}	~~C-34~~	C-34^{R}	–	–	–	–	(XP-34)^{R}	–	–	–	H-34	–	–	–	–	–	–	–	–	–	–	T-34	–	–	–	–	X-34	–
35	–	–	–	(YB-35)	(UC-35)	(XC-35)^{R}	–	–	F-35	–	P-35^{R}	–	–	–	(XH-35)	–	–	–	(MQ-35)	–	–	–	–	–	–	T-35	–	–	–	–	X-35	–
36	–	–	–	B-36 / G (NB-36H)	(YFC-36)*	C-36^{R}	–	–	–	–	P-36^{R}	–	–	–	H-36†	–	–	–	–	–	–	–	–	–	–	(XT-36)	–	–	–	–	X-36	–
37	A-37 (EA-37)	–	–	B-37^{R}	C-37A; C-37B	C-37^{R}	–	–	–	–	(YP-37)^{R}	–	–	–	H-37	–	–	–	–	–	–	–	–	–	–	T-37	–	–	–	–	X-37	–
38	–	–	–	(XB-38)^{R}	C-38	C-38^{R}	–	–	–	–	P-38^{R} (ZF-38)	–	–	–	H-38†	–	–	–	–	–	–	–	–	–	–	T-38	–	–	(RU-38)	–	X-38	–
39	–	–	–	(XB-39)^{R}	~~C-39~~	C-39^{R}	–	–	–	–	P-39 / E^{R} (ZF-39)	–	–	–	(XH-39)	–	–	–	–	–	–	–	–	–	–	T-39	–	–	–	–	X-39‡	–
40	–	–	–	(YB-40)^{R}	C-40	C-40^{R}	–	–	–	–	P-40^{R} (ZF-40)	–	–	–	(YH-40)	–	–	–	–	–	–	–	–	–	–	T-40	–	–	–	–	X-40	–
41	–	–	–	(XB-41)^{R}	C-41	C-41^{R} C-41A^{R}	–	–	–	–	(XP-41)^{R}	–	–	–	(UH-41)	–	–	–	–	–	–	–	–	–	–	T-41†; T-41	–	–	–	–	X-41	–
42	–	–	–	(XB-42)	~~C-42~~	C-42^{R}	–	–	–	–	(XP-42)^{R}	–	–	–	(XH-42)	–	–	–	(FQ-42)	–	–	–	–	–	–	T-42 (1952); T-42 (1960)	–	–	–	–	X-42	–
43	–	–	–	(XB-43)	~~C-43~~	C-43	–	–	–	–	P-43^{R}	–	–	–	H-43	–	–	–	–	–	–	–	–	–	–	T-43	–	–	–	–	X-43	–
44	–	–	–	(XB-44)^{R}	~~C-44~~	C-44^{R}	–	–	–	–	P-44^{R}	–	–	–	H-44†	–	–	–	(FQ-44)	–	–	–	–	–	–	T-44	–	–	–	–	X-44; X-44A	–
45	–	–	–	B-45	(KC-45)	C-45	–	–	–	–	P-45^{R}	–	–	–	H-45†	–	–	–	–	–	–	–	–	–	–	T-45	–	–	–	–	X-45	–
46	–	–	–	(XB-46)	(KC-46)	C-46	–	–	–	–	(XP-46)^{R}	–	–	(YHC-1A)	(CH-46)	–	–	–	–	–	–	–	–	–	–	T-46	–	–	–	–	X-46	–
47	–	–	–	B-47 / C	–	C-47 / F AC-47	–	–	F-47	–	P-47^{R} F-47	–	–	(YHC-1B)	(CH-47)	–	–	–	–	–	–	–	–	–	–	T-47 (OT-47B)	–	–	–	–	X-47A / B / C	–
48	–	–	–	(XB-48)	–	C-48^{R}	–	–	–	–	(XP-48)^{R}	–	–	–	(XH-48)	–	–	–	(FQ-48)	–	–	–	–	–	–	(YT-48); T-48TS	–	–	–	–	X-48	–
49	–	–	–	(YB-49)	–	C-49^{R}	–	–	–	–	(XP-49)^{R}	–	–	–	(XH-49)	–	–	–	–	–	–	–	–	–	–	(CT-49)	–	–	–	–	X-49	–
50	–	–	–	B-50 / C	–	C-50^{R}	–	–	–	–	(XP-50)^{R}	–	–	–	(QH-50)	–	–	–	–	–	–	–	–	–	–	T-50	–	–	–	–	X-50	–
51	–	–	–	(XB-51)	–	C-51^{R}	–	–	–	–	P-51^{R} F-51	–	–	–	(XH-51)	–	–	–	–	–	–	–	–	–	–	T-51	–	–	–	–	X-51	–
52	–	–	–	B-52	–	C-52^{R}	–	–	–	–	(XP-52)^{R}	–	–	–	(HH-52)	–	–	–	–	–	–	–	–	–	–	T-52	–	–	–	–	~~X-52~~	–
53	–	–	–	(XB-53)	–	C-53	–	–	–	–	(XP-53)^{R}	–	–	–	(CH-53 / E / K) (MH-53)	–	–	–	–	–	–	–	–	–	–	T-53	–	–	–	–	X-53	–
54	–	–	–	B-54	–	C-54	–	–	–	–	(XP-54)^{R}	–	–	–	(CH-54)	–	–	–	–	–	–	–	–	–	–	T-54	–	–	–	–	X-54	–
55	–	–	–	(XB-55)	–	C-55^{R}	–	–	–	–	(XP-55)^{R}	–	–	–	(TH-55)	–	–	–	–	–	–	–	–	–	–	–	–	–	–	–	X-55	–
56	–	–	–	(XB-56)	–	C-56^{R}	–	–	–	–	(XP-56)^{R}	–	–	–	(AH-56)	–	–	–	–	–	–	–	–	–	–	–	–	–	–	–	X-56	–
57	–	–	–	B-57 (RB-57D / F)	–	C-57^{R}	–	–	–	–	(XP-57)^{R}	–	–	–	(TH-57)	–	–	–	–	–	–	–	–	–	–	–	–	–	–	–	X-57	–
58	–	–	–	B-58	–	C-58^{R}	–	–	–	–	(XP-58)^{R}	–	–	–	(OH-58)	–	–	–	(XQ-58)	–	–	–	–	–	–	–	–	–	–	–	~~X-58~~	–
59	–	–	–	(XB-59)	–	C-59^{R}	–	–	–	–	(XP-59)^{R} P-59^{R} (ZF-59)	–	–	–	(XH-59)	–	–	–	–	–	–	–	–	–	–	–	–	–	–	–	X-59	–
60	–	–	–	(YB-60)	–	C-60^{R}	–	–	–	–	P-60^{R}	–	–	–	(HH-60) (MH-60) (SH-60) (UH-60)	–	–	–	–	–	–	–	–	–	–	–	–	–	–	–	X-60	–
61	–	–	–	B-61	–	(UC-61)^{R}	–	–	–	–	P-61^{R} F-61 (RF-61C)	–	–	–	(YUH-61)	–	–	–	–	–	–	–	–	–	–	–	–	–	–	–	X-61	–
62	–	–	–	B-62	–	C-62^{R}	–	–	–	–	(XP-62)^{R}	–	–	–	(XCH-62)	–	–	–	–	–	–	–	–	–	–	–	–	–	–	–	X-62	–
63	–	–	–	B-63	–	C-63^{R}	–	–	–	–	P-63^{R} (QF-63)	–	–	–	(YAH-63)	–	–	–	–	–	–	–	–	–	–	–	–	–	–	–	X-63	–
64	–	–	–	B-64	–	C-64	–	–	–	–	P-64^{R}	–	–	–	(AH-64)	–	–	–	–	–	–	–	–	–	–	–	–	–	–	–	X-64	–
65	–	–	–	B-65	–	(XC-65)^{R}	–	–	–	–	(XP-65)^{R}	–	–	–	(MH-65)	–	–	–	–	–	–	–	–	–	–	–	–	–	–	–	X-65	–
66	–	–	–	B-66	–	C-66^{R}	–	–	–	–	P-66^{R}	–	–	–	(RAH-66)	–	–	–	–	–	–	–	–	–	–	–	–	–	–	–	X-66	–
67	–	–	–	(XB-67)	–	C-67^{R}	–	–	–	–	(XP-67)^{R}	–	–	–	(TH-67)	–	–	–	(XQ-67)	–	–	–	–	–	–	–	–	–	–	–	–	–
68	–	–	–	(XB-68); B-68	–	C-68^{R}	–	–	–	–	(XP-68)^{R}	–	–	–	(MH-68)	–	–	–	–	–	–	–	–	–	–	–	–	–	–	–	(X-68)	–
69	–	–	–	(RB-69)	–	C-69	–	–	–	–	(XP-69)^{R}	–	–	–	~~H-69~~	–	–	–	–	–	–	–	–	–	–	–	–	–	–	–	–	–
70	–	–	–	(XB-70)	–	(UC-70 / B)^{R}	–	–	–	–	P-70^{R}	–	–	–	(ARH-70)	–	–	–	–	–	–	–	–	–	RS-70	–	–	–	–	–	–	–
71	–	–	–	B-71	–	(UC-71)^{R}	–	–	–	–	(XP-71)^{R}	–	–	–	(VH-71)	–	–	–	–	–	–	–	–	SR-71^{AF}	RS-71	–	–	–	–	–	–	–
72	–	–	–	–	–	(UC-72)^{R}	–	–	–	–	(XP-72)^{R}	–	–	–	(UH-72)	–	–	–	(XRQ-72)	–	–	–	–	SR-72	–	–	–	–	–	–	–	–
73	–	–	–	–	–	C-73^{R}	–	–	–	–	(XP-73)^{R‡}	–	–	–	(TH-73)	–	–	–	(XRQ-73)	–	–	–	–	–	–	–	–	–	–	–	–	–
74	–	–	–	–	–	C-74	–	–	–	–	~~P-74~~	–	–	–	–	–	–	–	–	–	–	–	–	–	–	–	–	–	–	–	–	–
75	–	–	–	–	–	C-75^{R}	–	–	–	–	P-75^{R}	–	–	–	–	–	–	–	–	–	–	–	–	–	–	–	–	–	–	(MV-75)	–	–
76	–	–	–	–	–	C-76^{R}	–	–	–	–	P-76^{R}	–	–	–	–	–	–	–	–	–	–	–	–	–	–	–	–	–	–	–	(X-76)	–
77	–	–	–	–	–	(UC-77 / B/D)^{R}	–	–	–	–	(XP-77)^{R}	–	–	–	–	–	–	–	–	–	–	–	–	–	–	–	–	–	–	–	–	–
78	–	–	–	–	–	C-78^{R}	–	–	–	–	(XP-78)^{R}	–	–	–	–	–	–	–	–	–	–	–	–	–	–	–	–	–	–	–	–	–
79	–	–	–	–	–	C-79^{R}	–	–	–	–	(XP-79)^{R}	–	–	–	–	–	–	–	–	–	–	–	–	–	–	–	–	–	–	–	–	–
80	–	–	–	–	–	(UC-80)^{R}	–	–	–	–	P-80^{R} F-80	–	–	–	–	–	–	–	–	–	–	–	–	–	–	–	–	–	–	–	–	–
81	–	–	–	–	–	(UC-81)^{R}	–	–	–	–	(XP-81)^{R} (XZF-81)	–	–	–	–	–	–	–	–	–	–	–	–	–	–	–	–	–	–	–	–	–
82	–	–	–	–	–	C-82	–	–	–	–	P-82^{R} F-82	–	–	–	–	–	–	–	–	–	–	–	–	–	–	–	–	–	–	–	–	–
83	–	–	–	–	–	(UC-83 / A / B)^{R}	–	–	–	–	(XP-83)^{R} (XF-83)	–	–	–	–	–	–	–	–	–	–	–	–	–	–	–	–	–	–	–	–	–
84	–	–	–	–	–	C-84^{R}	–	–	–	–	P-84^{R} F-84 / F / H	–	–	–	–	–	–	–	–	–	–	–	–	–	–	–	–	–	–	–	–	–
85	–	–	–	–	–	(UC-85)^{R}	–	–	–	–	(XP-85)^{R} (XF-85)	–	–	–	–	–	–	–	–	–	–	–	–	–	–	–	–	–	–	–	–	–
86	–	–	–	–	–	(UC-86)^{R}	–	–	–	–	P-86^{R} F-86 / C / D	–	–	–	–	–	–	–	–	–	–	–	–	–	–	–	–	–	–	–	–	–
87	–	–	–	–	–	C-87^{R}	–	–	–	–	(XP-87)^{R} (XF-87)	–	–	–	–	–	–	–	–	–	–	–	–	–	–	–	–	–	–	–	–	–
88	–	–	–	–	–	(UC-88)^{R}	–	–	–	–	(XP-88)^{R} (XF-88)	–	–	–	–	–	–	–	–	–	–	–	–	–	–	–	–	–	–	–	–	–
89	–	–	–	–	–	(UC-89)^{R}	–	–	–	–	(XP-89)^{R} F-89	–	–	–	–	–	–	–	–	–	–	–	–	–	–	–	–	–	–	–	–	–
90	–	–	–	–	–	(UC-90)^{R}	–	–	–	–	(XP-90)^{R} (XF-90)	–	–	–	(MH-90)	–	–	–	–	–	–	–	–	–	–	–	–	–	–	–	–	–
91	–	–	–	–	–	C-91^{R}	–	–	–	–	(XP-91)^{R} (XF-91)	–	–	–	–	–	–	–	–	–	–	–	–	–	–	–	–	–	–	–	–	–
92	–	–	–	–	–	(UC-92)^{R}	–	–	–	–	(XP-92)^{R} (XF-92)	–	–	–	H-92 (VH-92)	–	–	–	–	–	–	–	–	–	–	–	–	–	–	–	–	–
93	–	–	–	–	–	C-93^{R}	–	–	–	–	(YF-93)	–	–	–	–	–	–	–	–	–	–	–	–	–	–	–	–	–	–	–	–	–
94	–	–	–	–	–	(UC-94)^{R}	–	–	–	–	F-94	–	–	–	–	–	–	–	–	–	–	–	–	–	–	–	–	–	–	–	–	–
95	–	–	–	–	–	(UC-95)^{R}	–	–	–	–	F-95	–	–	–	–	–	–	–	–	–	–	–	–	–	–	–	–	–	–	–	–	–
96	–	–	–	–	–	(UC-96)^{R}	–	–	–	–	(XF-96)	–	–	–	–	–	–	–	–	–	–	–	–	–	–	–	–	–	–	–	–	–
97	–	–	–	–	–	C-97 (KC-97)	–	–	–	–	F-97	–	–	–	–	–	–	–	–	–	–	–	–	–	–	–	–	–	–	–	–	–
98	–	–	–	–	–	C-98^{R}	–	–	–	–	F-98	–	–	–	–	–	–	–	–	–	–	–	–	–	–	–	–	–	–	–	–	–
99	–	–	–	–	–	(XC-99)	–	–	–	–	(YF-99)	–	–	–	–	–	–	–	–	–	–	–	–	–	–	–	–	–	–	–	–	–
100	–	–	–	–	–	(UC-100)^{R}	–	–	–	–	F-100 / B	–	–	–	–	–	–	–	–	–	–	–	–	–	–	–	–	–	–	–	–	–
101	–	–	–	–	–	(UC-101)^{R}	–	–	–	–	F-101	–	–	–	–	–	–	–	–	–	–	–	–	–	–	–	–	–	–	–	–	–
102	–	–	–	–	–	(UC-102)^{R}	–	–	–	–	F-102 / B	–	–	–	–	–	–	–	–	–	–	–	–	–	–	–	–	–	–	–	–	–
103	–	–	–	–	–	(UC-103)^{R}	–	–	–	–	(XF-103)	–	–	–	–	–	–	–	–	–	–	–	–	–	–	–	–	–	–	–	–	–
104	–	–	–	–	–	C-104^{R}	–	–	–	–	(XF-104); F-104 (NF-104A)	–	–	–	–	–	–	–	–	–	–	–	–	–	–	–	–	–	–	–	–	–
105	–	–	–	–	–	(XC-105)^{R}	–	–	–	–	F-105	–	–	–	–	–	–	–	–	–	–	–	–	–	–	–	–	–	–	–	–	–
106	–	–	–	–	–	C-106^{R}	–	–	–	–	(XF-106); F-106	–	–	–	–	–	–	–	–	–	–	–	–	–	–	–	–	–	–	–	–	–
107	–	–	–	–	–	(XC-107)^{R}	–	–	–	–	F-107	–	–	–	–	–	–	–	–	–	–	–	–	–	–	–	–	–	–	–	–	–
108	–	–	–	–	–	(XC-108)^{R}	–	–	–	–	(XF-108)	–	–	–	–	–	–	–	–	–	–	–	–	–	–	–	–	–	–	–	–	–
109	–	–	–	–	–	C-109^{R}	–	–	–	–	(XF-109)‡	–	–	–	–	–	–	–	–	–	–	–	–	–	–	–	–	–	–	–	–	–
110	–	–	–	–	–	C-110^{R}	–	–	(YF-110B/D / C)‡	–	F-110	–	–	–	–	–	–	–	–	–	–	–	–	–	–	–	–	–	–	–	–	–
111	–	–	(FB-111)	–	–	C-111^{R}	–	–	–	–	F-111 / B (EF-111)	–	–	–	–	–	–	–	–	–	–	–	–	–	–	–	–	–	–	–	–	–
112	–	–	–	–	–	(XC-112 / A)^{R}	–	–	(YF-112)‡	–	–	–	–	–	–	–	–	–	–	–	–	–	–	–	–	–	–	–	–	–	–	–
113	–	–	–	–	–	(XC-113)^{R}	–	–	(YF-113A / B/D / C)‡	–	–	–	–	–	–	–	–	–	–	–	–	–	–	–	–	–	–	–	–	–	–	–
114	–	–	–	–	–	(XC-114)	–	–	(YF-114)‡	–	–	–	–	–	–	–	–	–	–	–	–	–	–	–	–	–	–	–	–	–	–	–
115	–	–	–	–	–	(XC-115)	–	–	–	–	–	–	–	–	–	–	–	–	–	–	–	–	–	–	–	–	–	–	–	–	–	–
116	–	–	–	–	–	(YC-116)	–	–	(YF-116)‡	–	–	–	–	–	–	–	–	–	–	–	–	–	–	–	–	–	–	–	–	–	–	–
117	–	–	–	–	–	C-117 / D	–	–	F-117 (YF-117D)‡	–	–	–	–	–	–	–	–	–	–	–	–	–	–	–	–	–	–	–	–	–	–	–
118	–	–	–	–	–	C-118	–	–	(YF-118G)‡	–	–	–	–	–	–	–	–	–	–	–	–	–	–	–	–	–	–	–	–	–	–	–
119	–	–	–	–	–	C-119 (AC-119)	–	–	–	–	–	–	–	–	–	–	–	–	–	–	–	–	–	–	–	–	–	–	–	–	–	–
120	–	–	–	–	–	(XC-120)	–	–	–	–	–	–	–	–	–	–	–	–	–	–	–	–	–	–	–	–	–	–	–	–	–	–
121	–	–	–	–	–	C-121 / F (EC-121)	–	–	–	–	–	–	–	–	–	–	–	–	–	–	–	–	–	–	–	–	–	–	–	–	–	–
122	–	–	–	–	–	(YC-122)	–	–	–	–	–	–	–	–	–	–	–	–	–	–	–	–	–	–	–	–	–	–	–	–	–	–
123	–	–	–	–	–	C-123 / A	–	–	–	–	–	–	–	–	–	–	–	–	–	–	–	–	–	–	–	–	–	–	–	–	–	–
124	–	–	–	–	–	C-124	–	–	–	–	–	–	–	–	–	–	–	–	–	–	–	–	–	–	–	–	–	–	–	–	–	–
125	–	–	–	–	–	(YC-125)	–	–	–	–	–	–	–	–	–	–	–	–	–	–	–	–	–	–	–	–	–	–	–	–	–	–
126	–	–	–	–	–	LC-126)	–	–	–	–	–	–	–	–	–	–	–	–	–	–	–	–	–	–	–	–	–	–	–	–	–	–
127	–	–	–	–	–	C-127 (1948); C-127 (1954)	–	–	–	–	–	–	–	–	–	–	–	–	–	–	–	–	–	–	–	–	–	–	–	–	–	–
128	–	–	–	–	–	C-128	–	–	–	–	–	–	–	–	–	–	–	–	–	–	–	–	–	–	–	–	–	–	–	–	–	–
129	–	–	–	–	–	(YC-129)	–	–	–	–	–	–	–	–	–	–	–	–	–	–	–	–	–	–	–	–	–	–	–	–	–	–
130	–	–	–	–	–	C-130 / J (AC-130) (DC-130) (EC-130 / H) (HC-130) (KC-130) (LC-130) (MC-130) (RC-130) (WC-130)	–	–	–	–	–	–	–	–	–	–	–	–	–	–	–	–	–	–	–	–	–	–	–	–	–	–
131	–	–	–	–	–	C-131 (NC-131H)	–	–	–	–	–	–	–	–	–	–	–	–	–	–	–	–	–	–	–	–	–	–	–	–	–	–
132	–	–	–	–	–	C-132	–	–	–	–	–	–	–	–	–	–	–	–	–	–	–	–	–	–	–	–	–	–	–	–	–	–
133	–	–	–	–	–	C-133	–	–	–	–	–	–	–	–	–	–	–	–	–	–	–	–	–	–	–	–	–	–	–	–	–	–
134	–	–	–	–	–	(YC-134)	–	–	–	–	–	–	–	–	–	–	–	–	–	–	–	–	–	–	–	–	–	–	–	–	–	–
135	–	–	–	–	–	C-135 (EC-135) (KC-135) (NC-135) (OC-135) (RC-135) (WC-135)	–	–	–	–	–	–	–	–	–	–	–	–	–	–	–	–	–	–	–	–	–	–	–	–	–	–
136	–	–	–	–	–	(YC-136)	–	–	–	–	–	–	–	–	–	–	–	–	–	–	–	–	–	–	–	–	–	–	–	–	–	–
137	–	–	–	–	–	(YC-137); C-137 (UC-137)	–	–	–	–	–	–	–	–	–	–	–	–	–	–	–	–	–	–	–	–	–	–	–	–	–	–
138	–	–	–	–	–	C-138†	–	–	–	–	–	–	–	–	–	–	–	–	–	–	–	–	–	–	–	–	–	–	–	–	–	–
139	–	–	–	–	–	(SC-139)†	–	–	–	–	–	–	–	–	(MH-139)	–	–	–	–	–	–	–	–	–	–	–	–	–	–	–	–	–
140	–	–	–	–	–	C-140	–	–	–	–	–	–	–	–	–	–	–	–	–	–	–	–	–	–	–	–	–	–	–	–	–	–
141	–	–	–	–	–	C-141	–	–	–	–	–	–	–	–	–	–	–	–	–	–	–	–	–	–	–	–	–	–	–	–	–	–
142	–	–	–	–	–	(XC-142)	–	–	–	–	–	–	–	–	–	–	–	–	–	–	–	–	–	–	–	–	–	–	–	–	–	–
143	–	–	–	–	–	(XC-143)†; C-143	–	–	–	–	–	–	–	–	–	–	–	–	–	–	–	–	–	–	–	–	–	–	–	–	–	–
144	–	–	–	–	–	(HC-144)	–	–	–	–	–	–	–	–	–	–	–	–	–	–	–	–	–	–	–	–	–	–	–	–	–	–
145	–	–	–	–	–	C-145	–	–	–	–	–	–	–	–	–	–	–	–	–	–	–	–	–	–	–	–	–	–	–	–	–	–
146	–	–	–	–	–	C-146	–	–	–	–	–	–	–	–	–	–	–	–	–	–	–	–	–	–	–	–	–	–	–	–	–	–
147	–	–	–	–	–	C-147	–	–	–	–	–	–	–	–	–	–	–	–	–	–	–	–	–	–	–	–	–	–	–	–	–	–
170	–	–	–	–	–	–	–	–	–	–	–	–	–	–	–	–	–	–	(RQ-170)	–	–	–	–	–	–	–	–	–	–	–	–	–
180	–	–	–	–	–	–	–	–	–	–	–	–	–	–	–	–	–	–	(RQ-180)*	–	–	–	–	–	–	–	–	–	–	–	–	–
322	–	–	–	–	–	–	–	–	–	–	P-322^{R}	–	–	–	–	–	–	–	–	–	–	–	–	–	–	–	–	–	–	–	–	–
400	–	–	–	–	–	–	–	–	–	–	P-400^{R}	–	–	–	–	–	–	–	–	–	–	–	–	–	–	–	–	–	–	–	–	–
767	–	–	–	–	(KC-767)	–	–	–	–	–	–	–	–	–	–	–	–	–	–	–	–	–	–	–	–	–	–	–	–	–	–	–
880	–	–	–	–	(UC-880)‡	–	–	–	–	–	–	–	–	–	–	–	–	–	–	–	–	–	–	–	–	–	–	–	–	–	–	–
