= P22 =

P22 may refer to:

- P22 (type foundry), a digital type foundry, Rochester, New York, United States
- LÉ Aoife (P22), a patrol vessel of the Irish Naval Service
- Curtiss XP-22 Hawk, an experimental biplane fighter
- Maltese patrol boat P22, of the Armed Forces of Malta
- Mwera language
- Papyrus 22, a biblical manuscript
- Salmonella virus P22, a bacteriophage
- Walther P22, a pistol
- Norfolk Southern train P22, involved in the 2005 Graniteville train crash, South Carolina, United States
- P22, a state regional road in Latvia
- P-22, a mountain lion that resided in Griffith Park, Los Angeles, California, United States
