= T48 =

T48 or T-48 may refer to:

- Cessna T-48, an American trainer aircraft
- HMS Laburnum (T48), a sloop of the Royal Navy
- Slingsby T.48, a proposed British glider
- T-48 MPATS, a U.S. Navy aircraft project
- T48 Gun Motor Carriage, an American anti-tank gun
- T48 rifle, an American battle rifle
