= March Field Air Museum =

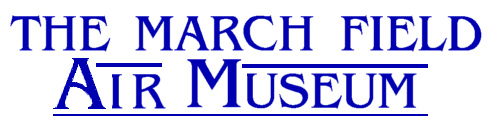

- Location within California
- Established: 1979
- Location: Riverside County, near Moreno Valley, California
- Coordinates: 33.883848°N 117.266682°W
- Type: Aviation museum
- Founder: Lt. Gen. James E. Mullins
- Website: www.marchfield.org

The March Field Air Museum is an aviation museum near Moreno Valley and Riverside, California, located at March Air Reserve Base.

== History ==
=== Establishment ===
The museum was founded in 1979 as March Air Force Base Museum. One of the first exhibits at the museum was a collection of art painted by Hazel Olson. It opened to the public on 19 December 1979 in the former base theater, Building 467. Following the establishment of the March Field Museum Foundation in May 1980, it moved to a new location in Building 420 – the base's 26,000 sq ft (2,400 m^{2}) former commissary – where it reopened on 20 February 1981. That same year, a B-29 was flown to the museum. By 1983 it had been renamed to the March Field Museum and had at least seven aircraft on display. As a smaller institution it was categorized as a "Class C" museum, but hoped to be promoted to "Class B" status and move to a location off base to attract more visitors. By 1986, the museum's planes were dispersed between three different locations on the base and plans for a 200,000 sq ft (19,000 m^{2}) building were made to bring them together. At the start of 1987 a site on the west side of the runway along Interstate 215 had been selected and in July 1990 construction was approved.

=== Move ===
Construction on a new 19,200 sq ft (1,780 m^{2}) hangar on the 30-acre (120,000 m^{2}) parcel began in April 1992. It opened in the new location in 1993. Originally operated by the Air Force, the museum's operation was transferred to a nonprofit organization in 1996. In May 1999, the museum changed its name to the March Field Air Museum. In June of the following year the Dick Van Rennes Restoration Hangar was dedicated.

By 2002, a replica P-38 under construction at the museum was over ninety percent complete.

The museum's 120th aircraft, an F-16, was added to the collection on 3 October 2025.

In October 2025, the president, Jamil Dada, fired the museum's collections manager, archivist and a restoration assistant. The director of collections and security supervisor subsequently resigned in protest. Dada claimed that the museum was having financial difficulties. This was disputed by the former director of collections, who stated that the museum had been solvent as of 2023. It was alleged that the museum president and vice president announced plans to eliminate the museum's archives and sell aircraft from the collection at a volunteer meeting. The museum later issued a statement that it did not intend to do so. The museum hired a new executive director, Michael D. Ellzey, in December. At the same time, questions were raised over whether the previous removals were conducted according to museum bylaws. A new curator, Keegan Chetwynd, was hired the following February. A garden designed to conserve water was opened in March.

A VH-3 was transported from the Nixon Library to the museum in June 2026 to undergo restoration.

== Exhibits ==
=== Indoor exhibits ===
Indoor displays include a timeline of March Field, a gallery about the Space Race, a display about strategic reconnaissance and a recreation of a World War II-era mural. The P-38 National Association also operates the Tony LeVier Hangar south of the main hangar.

=== Outdoor exhibits ===
- A memorial to War dogs.
- The Distinguished Flying Cross National Memorial Act, signed July 25, 2014, designated the memorial at the museum in honor of current and former members of the Armed Forces who have been awarded the Distinguished Flying Cross as the Distinguished Flying Cross National Memorial. The national memorial was dedicated on October 27, 2010.
- A memorial to NASA astronauts killed in the Challenger and Columbia disasters that uses a Space Shuttle Solid Rocket Booster.
- 15th Air Force Commemorative Wall. Dedicated in 1998, the 15th Air Force Commemorative Wall at March Field Air Museum pays tribute to the men and women who served in the 15th Air Force during World War II.
- Frank Zizzo Radio Room – An approximately 1,100 sq ft (100 m^{2}) hut with over 100 radios operated by the Moreno Valley Amateur Radio Association.
- Firebase Romeo Charlie – A recreation of a Vietnam War firebase.

== Aircraft on display ==
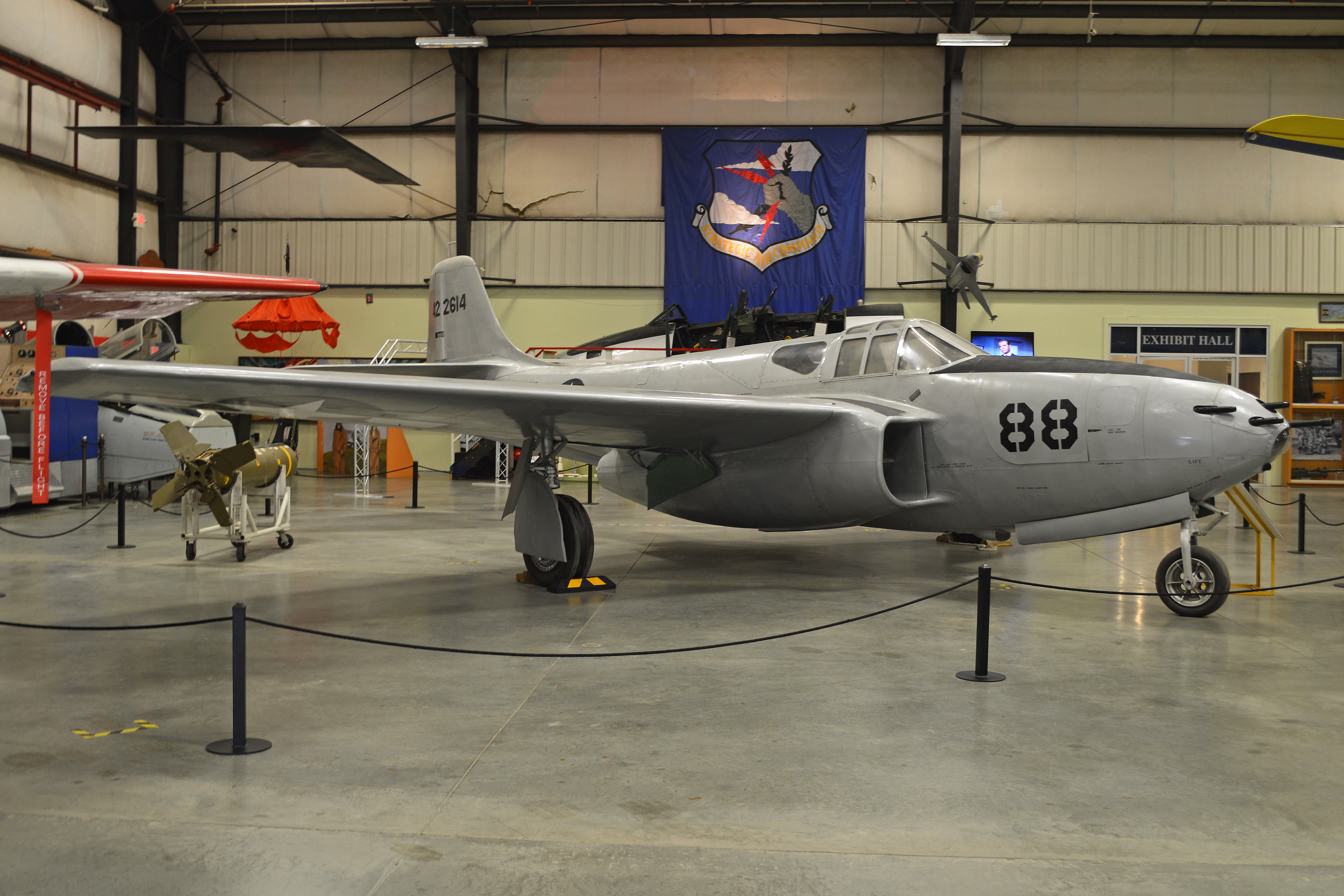
Bell P-59A Airacomet

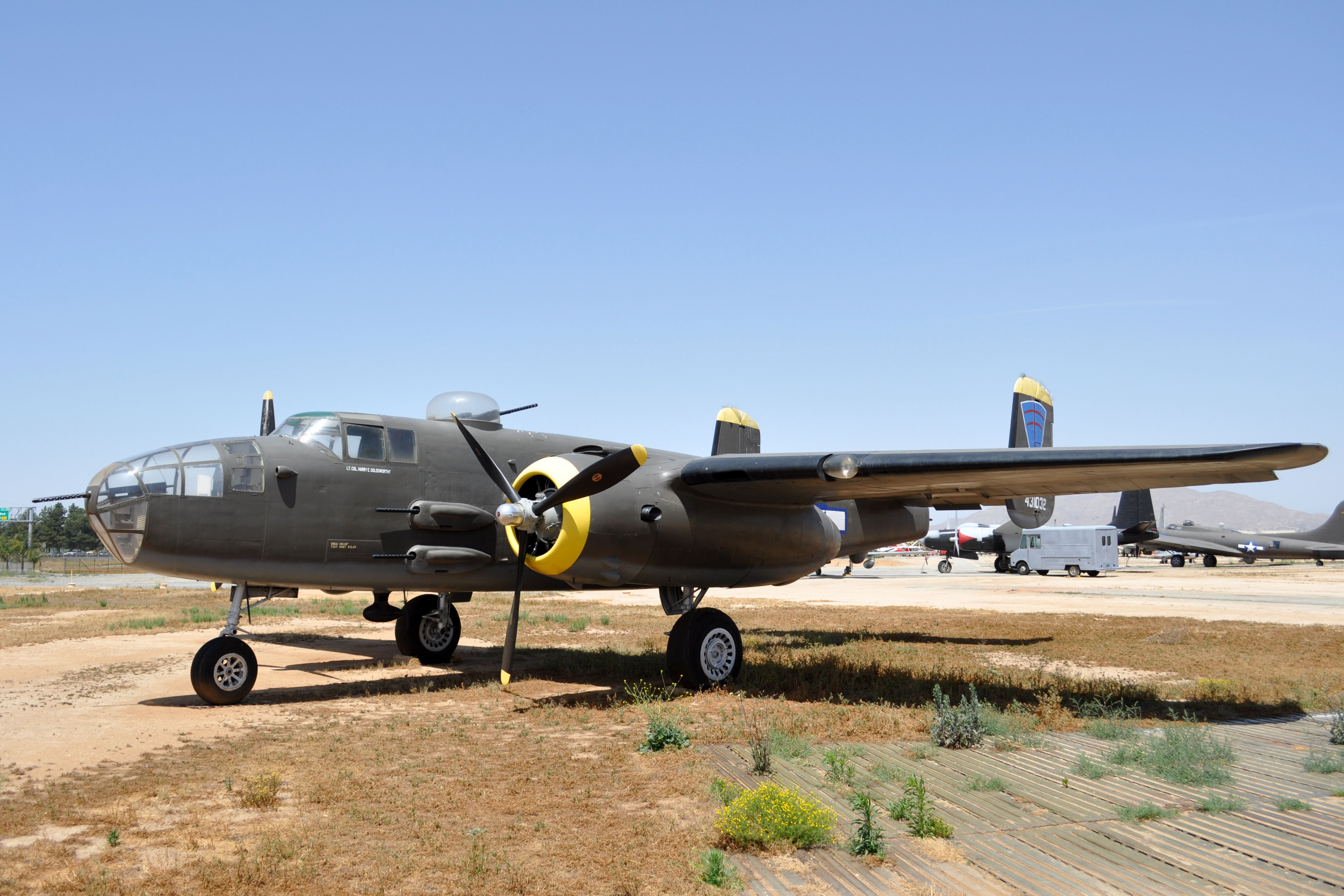
North American B-25J Mitchell

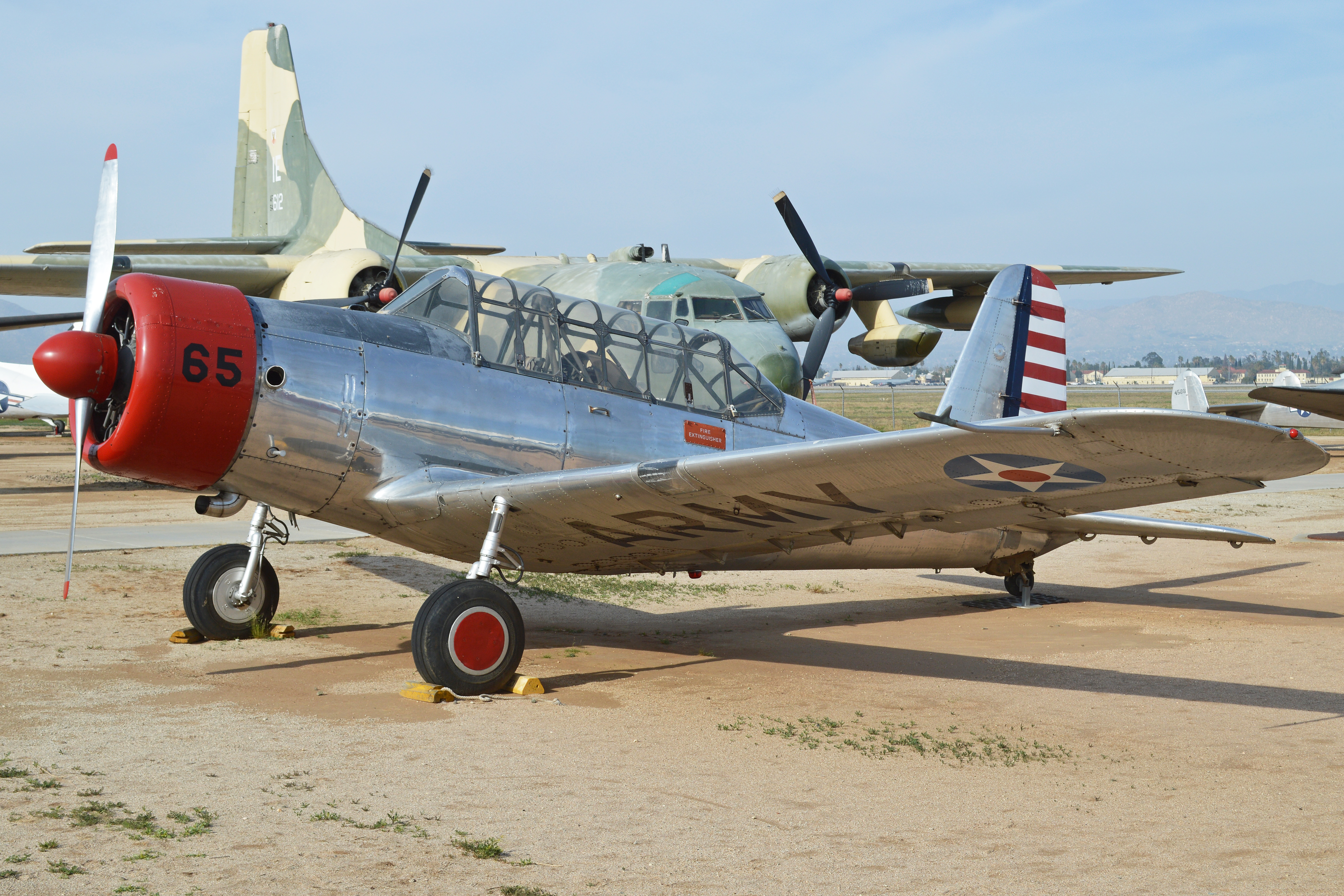
Vultee BT-13A Valiant

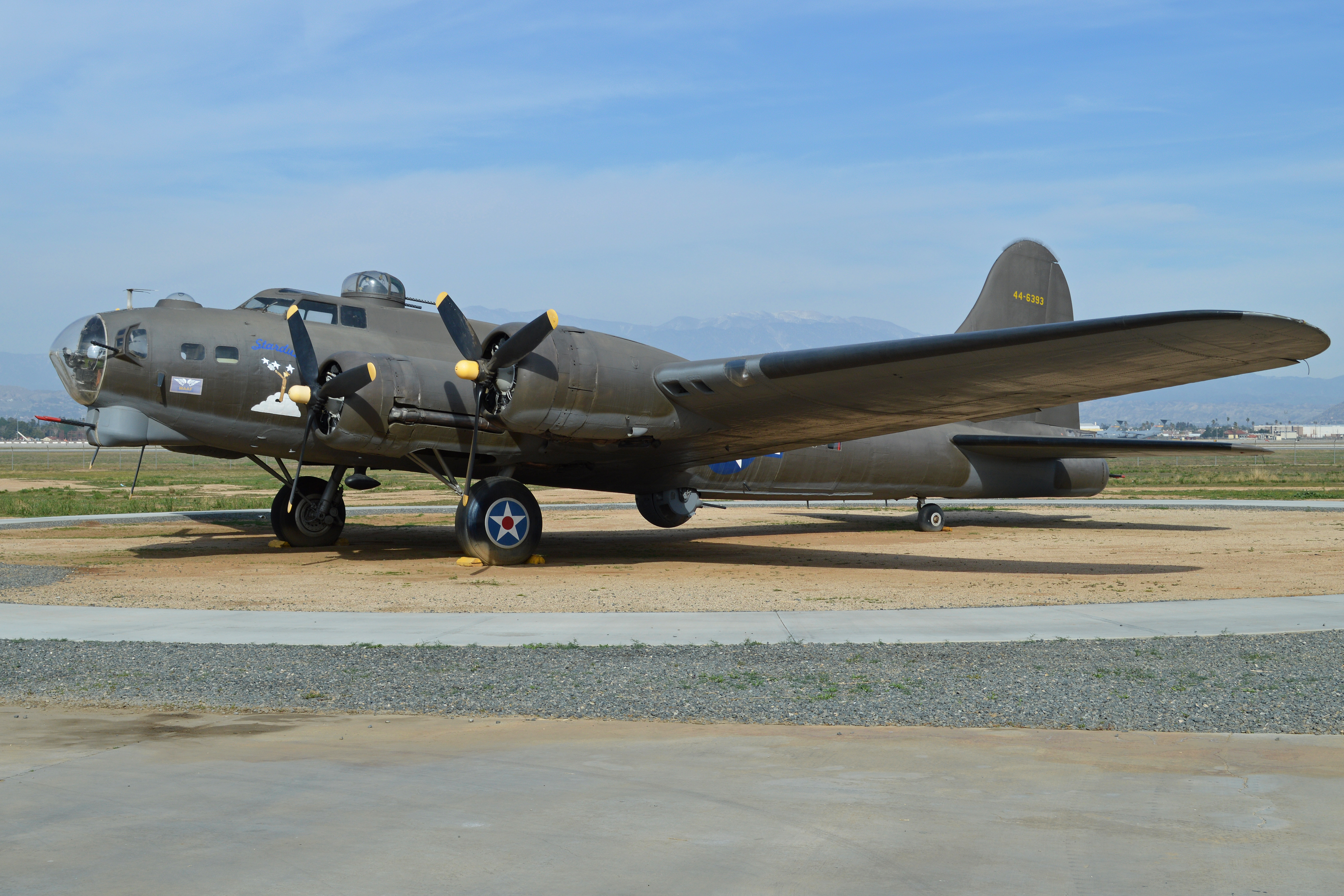
Boeing B-17G Flying Fortress

1. Aero Commander U-9A 52-6218
2. Antonov An-2 ANATDSR-IR-16550
3. Beechcraft AT-11 Kansan
4. Beechcraft C-45J Expeditor 44588
5. Beechcraft T-34A Mentor 52-7648
6. Beechcraft T-34A Mentor 53-3347
7. Bell AH-1F Cobra 69-16416
8. Bell P-39Q Airacobra – Composite
9. Bell P-59 Airacomet 44-22614
10. Bell OH-58 Kiowa 71-61668
11. Bell UH-1B Iroquois 62-12537
12. Bell UH-1D Iroquois 66-0925
13. Bell UH-1F Iroquois 63-13143
14. Bensen B-8M
15. Boeing B-17G Flying Fortress 44-6393 "Starduster"
16. Boeing B-29A Superfortress 44-61669
17. Boeing B-47E Stratojet 53-2275
18. Boeing B-52D Stratofortress 55-0679
19. Boeing KC-97L Stratofreighter 53-0363
20. Boeing KC-135A Stratotanker 55-3130 "Old Granddad"
21. Cessna A-37B Dragonfly 71-0790
22. Cessna T-37B Tweet 57-2316
23. Cessna O-1 Bird Dog
24. Cessna O-2A Skymaster 68-11067
25. Cessna O-2B Skymaster 67-21465
26. Cessna U-3A 58-2112
27. Consolidated PT-6A 30-385
28. Convair C-131D Samaritan 54-2808
29. Convair F-102A Delta Dagger 56-1114
30. Curtiss JN-4 – Scale replica
31. de Havilland Canada C-7A Caribou 63-9757
32. Douglas A-26C Invader 44-35224
33. Douglas EA-1E Skyraider 132789
34. Douglas C-54Q Skymaster 56514
35. Douglas TA-4J Skyhawk
36. Douglas VC-47A Skytrain 43-15579
37. ERCO Ercoupe N2640H
38. Fairchild C-123K Provider 54-0612
39. Fairchild PT-19B
40. Folland Gnat E1076
41. General Atomics MQ-1B Predator
42. General Dynamics F-16A Fighting Falcon 79-365
43. General Dynamics FB-111A Aardvark 68-0245
44. Grumman YF-14A Tomcat 157990
45. Grumman EA-6B Prowler 161882
46. Grumman HU-16E Albatross 1293
47. Hispano HA-200 Saeta
48. Hughes OH-6A Cayuse 68-17252
49. Lockheed C-141B Starlifter 65-0257
50. Lockheed D-21B
51. Lockheed F-104A Starfighter 56-0755
52. Lockheed P-38L Lightning – Replica
53. Lockheed R5O-5 Lodestar 12473
54. Lockheed SR-71A Blackbird 61-7975
55. Lockheed T-33A Shooting Star 58-0513
56. Lockheed TV-1
57. LTV A-7D Corsair II 69-6188
58. Martin EB-57B Canberra 52-1519
59. McDonnell F-101B Voodoo 59-0418
60. McDonnell Douglas F-4C Phantom II 63-7693
61. McDonnell Douglas F-4E Phantom II 68-0382
62. McDonnell Douglas F-15 Eagle 76-0008
63. McDonnell Douglas KC-10A Extender 84-0185
64. McDonnell Douglas RF-4C Phantom II 63-7746
65. Mikoyan-Gurevich MiG-15
66. Mikoyan-Gurevich MiG-17
67. Mikoyan-Gurevich MiG-17F
68. Mikoyan-Gurevich MiG-19
69. Mikoyan-Gurevich MiG-21
70. Mikoyan-Gurevich MiG-23 0393215744
71. MMIST CQ-10A Snowgoose
72. Nieuport 11 – Scale replica
73. Nieuport 11 – Scale replica
74. North American CT-39A Sabreliner 62-4465
75. North American F-86A Sabre 49-1324
76. North American F-86H Sabre 53-1304
77. North American F-86L Sabre 50-0560
78. North American F-100C Super Sabre 54-1786
79. North American P-51D Mustang – replica
80. North American SNJ-4 Texan 51360
81. North American T-28A Trojan 49-1617
82. North American T-28A Trojan 50-0203
83. North American TB-25J Mitchell 44-31032
84. Northrop F-89J Scorpion 52-1949
85. Northrop T-38A Talon 60-0593
86. Northrop YA-9A 71-1368
87. Piasecki H-21B Workhorse 53-4326
88. Republic F-84C Thunderjet 47-1595
89. Republic F-84F Thunderstreak 51-9432
90. Republic F-105B Thunderchief 57-5803
91. Republic F-105D Thunderchief 62-4383
92. Sauser P6E
93. Schweizer TG-2
94. Sikorsky HH-34J Choctaw 148943
95. Stearman PT-13D Kaydet 42-16388
96. Stinson L-5 Sentinel
97. Vultee BT-13A Valiant 41-21487
98. Vultee BT-13A Valiant N54865 – Converted to resemble an Aichi D3A
99. Wright Flyer – Replica
100. Yakovlev Yak-52

== Events ==
The museum held an annual gala celebration.

== In the media ==
The March Field Air Museum was featured on an episode of Ghost Adventures in 2018. The team of paranormal investigators investigated paranormal claims of artifacts being thrown out of their glass cases by an unseen force while in the Main Hangar, voices of children who died with their mother from the flu when they lived on the property before the Restoration Hangar was built, and sounds of soldiers preparing for battle while in the Lockheed C-141 Starlifter display aircraft.
