= Curtiss H-1640 Chieftain =

Unusual American 12-cylinder radial aero engine

H-1640
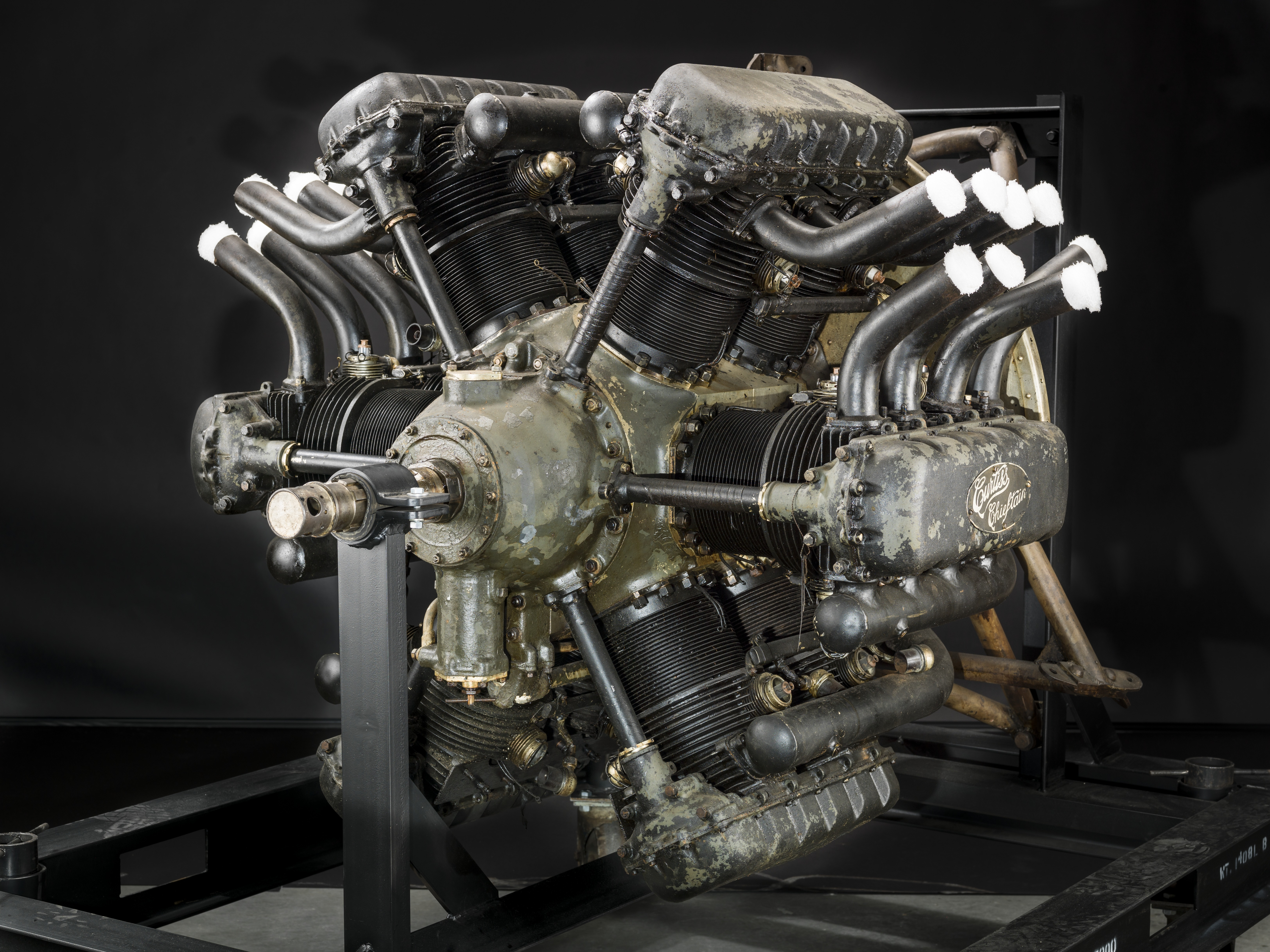
- H-1640 engine at the National Air and Space Museum
- Type: Radial aero engine
- National origin: United States
- Manufacturer: Curtiss Aeroplane and Motor Company
- First run: 1926
- Number built: 8

The Curtiss H-1640 Chieftain was an unusual American 12-cylinder radial aero engine designed and built by the Curtiss Aeroplane and Motor Company in the mid-1920s. In contrast to most multi-row radials, where the cylinders in the rows are staggered to present better airflow for cooling, the Chieftain used the inline radial arrangement with the cylinders behind each other to allow pairs of cylinders to share a cast cylinder head and camshafts. The design saw some use in the 1920s but was quickly passed by newer designs.

== Design and development ==
The H-1640 was an air-cooled 12 cylinder two-row radial with the cylinder rows aligned rather than staggered as in most multi-row radials. One piece cylinder heads shared a single overhead camshaft and the propeller was directly driven. By aligning the cylinders the effective diameter and frontal area of the engine was less than more conventional radial engines, and it was thought that the use of a Townend ring could make the engine more aerodynamically efficient than an inline engine. The engine first ran in 1927.

The H-1640 was the first airworthy 'inline radial' and was sponsored for flight testing in a range of aircraft by the U.S. Government. Among the types selected were the Thomas-Morse XP-13 and the Curtiss XO-18. Cooling problems with the rear cylinders caused the project to be canceled with few production engines being built.

A similar engine is the Bristol Hydra although this engine had 16 aligned cylinders, forming an octagon. Further similar engines are the Armstrong Siddeley Hyena and the much larger Armstrong Siddeley Deerhound.

== Applications ==
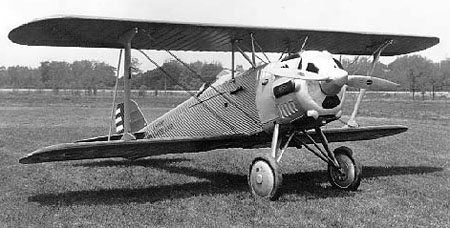
A Thomas-Morse XP-13 Viper fitted with a Curtiss H-1640 Chieftain during testing

- Curtiss XP-22 Hawk
- Curtiss YP-20
- Curtiss P-6 Hawk
- Thomas-Morse XP-13 Viper
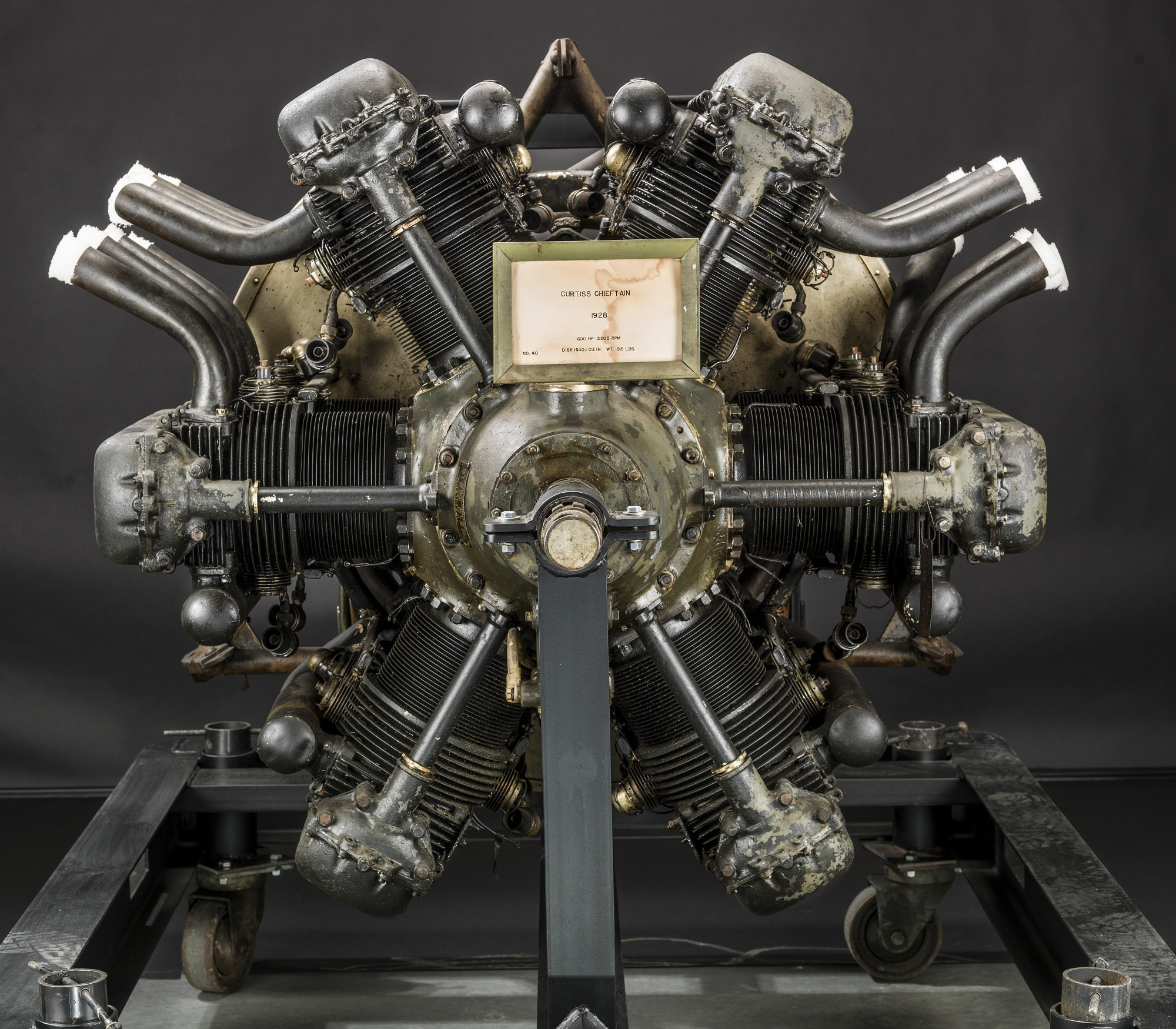

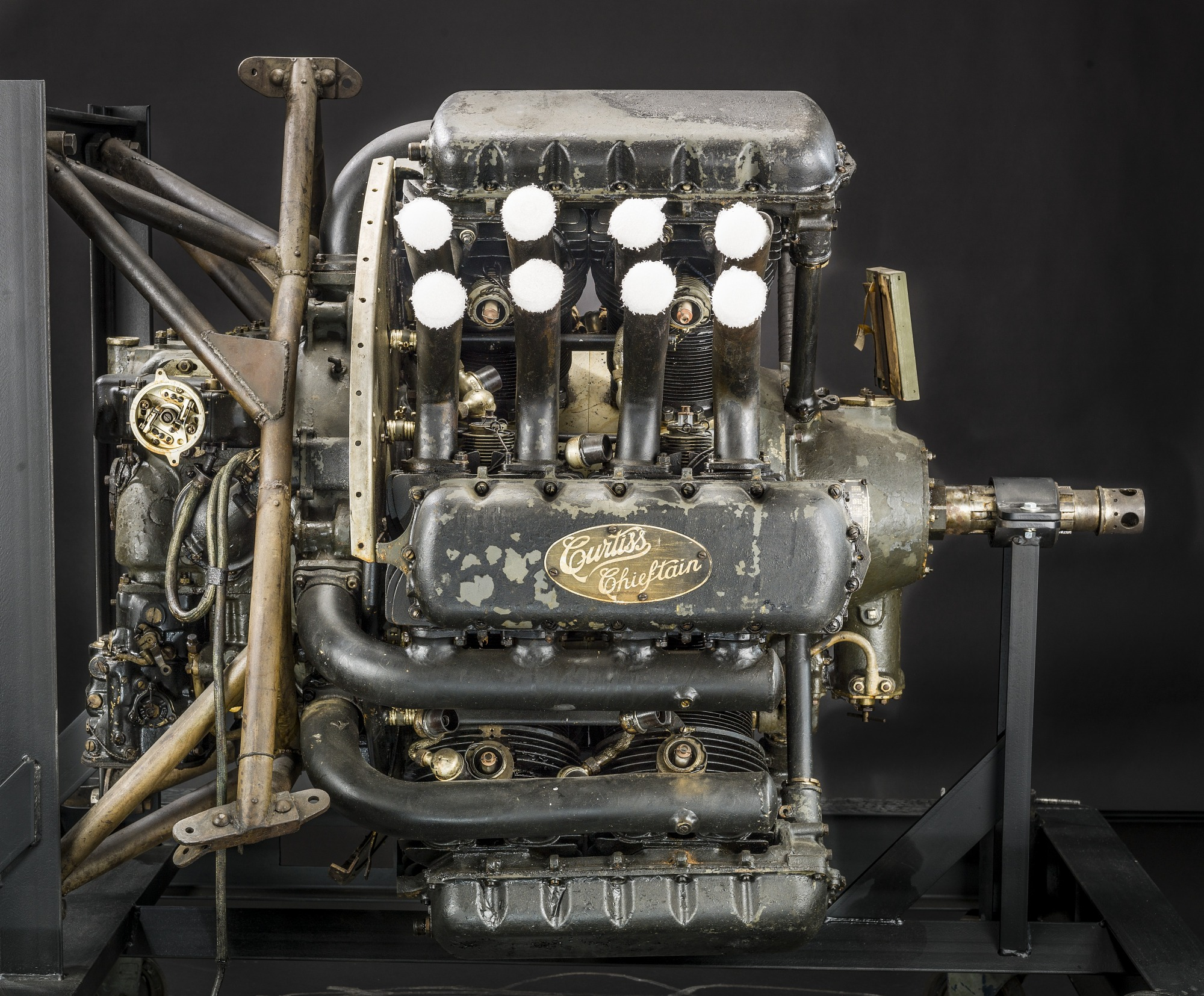

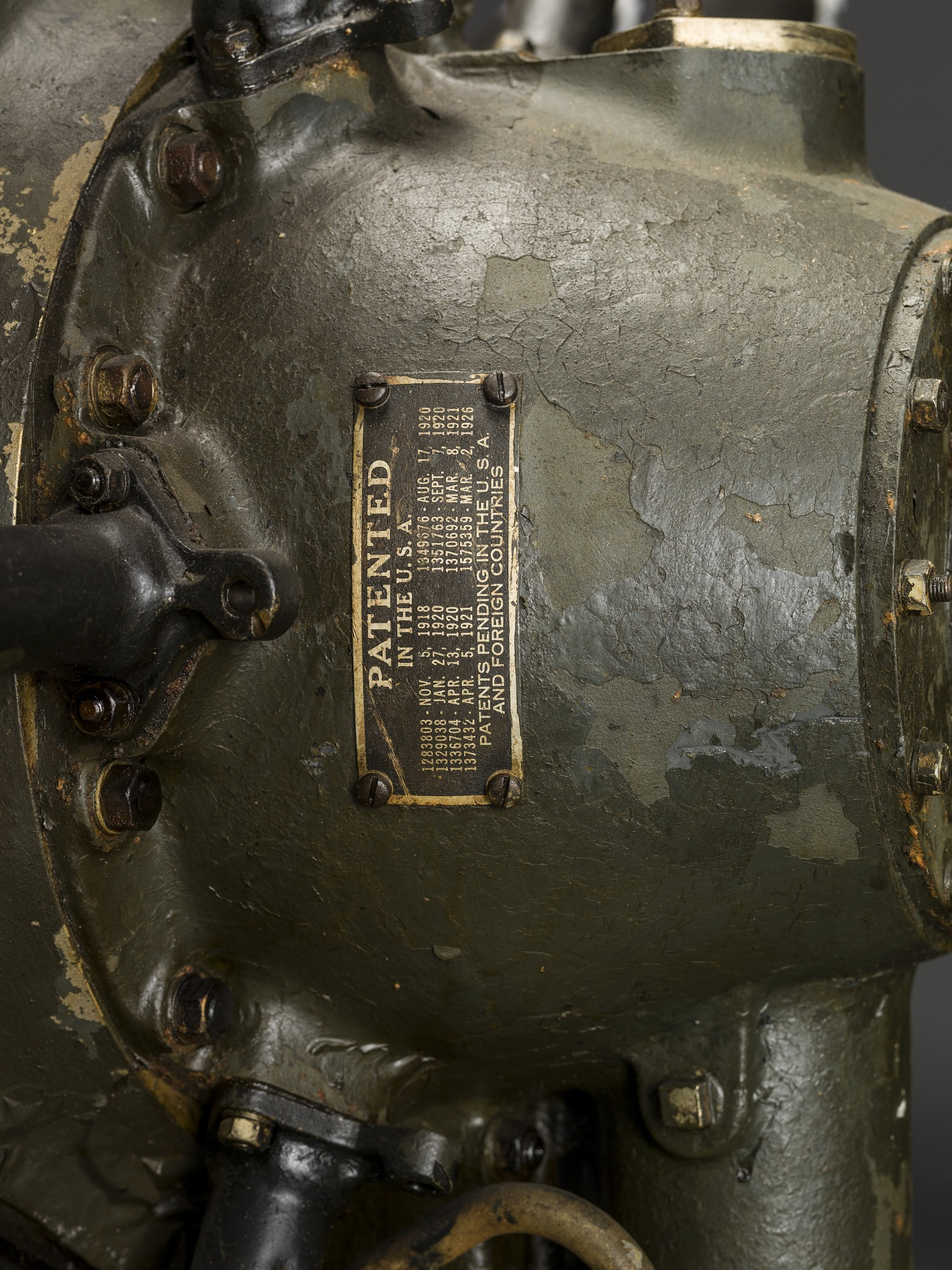

== Specifications (H-1640) ==
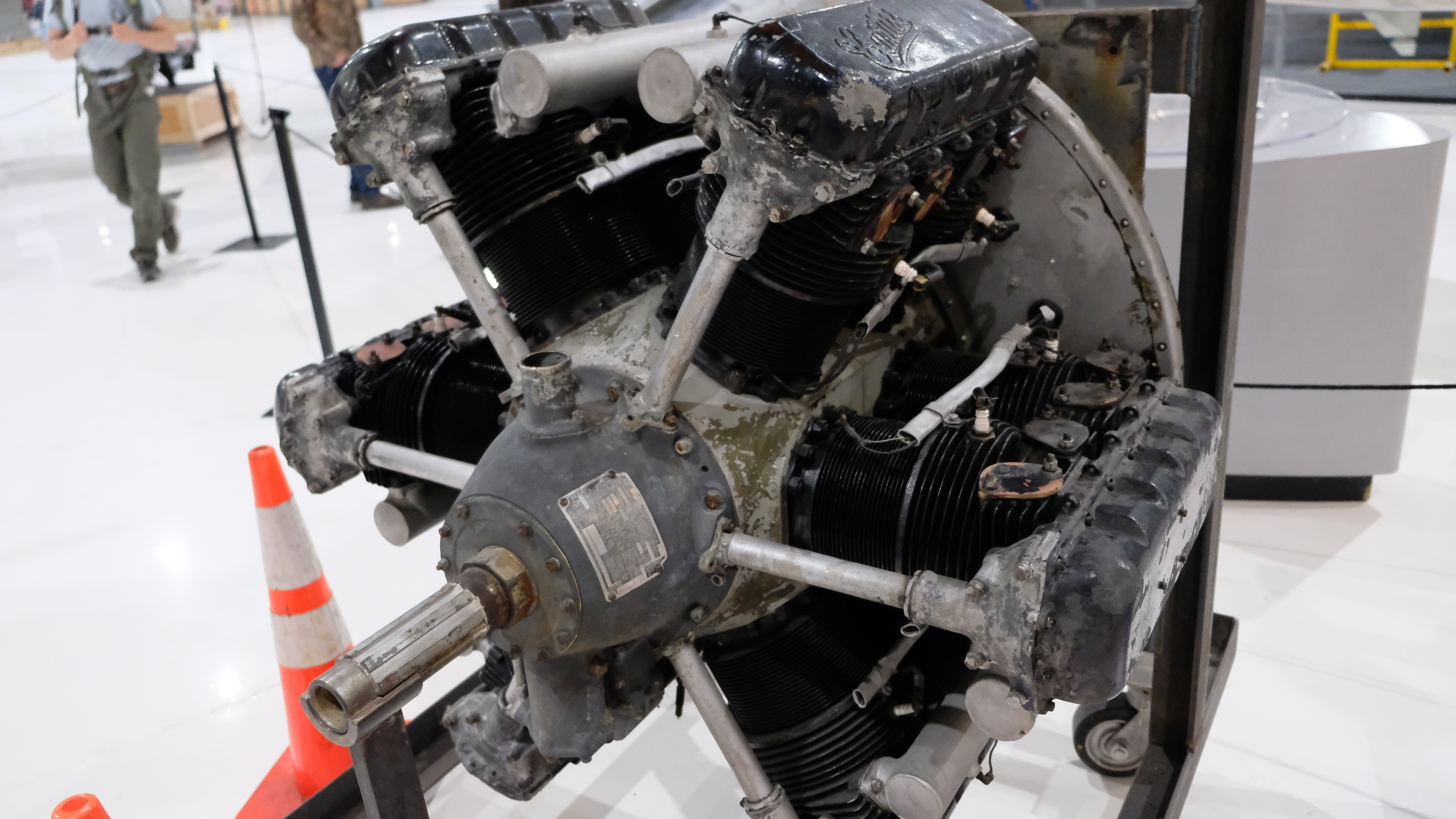
Curtis H 1640 Engine - located at the Wings Over The Rockies museum, Denver, CO

Data from enginehistory.org

=== General characteristics ===
- Type: 12-cylinder, two-row, air-cooled radial engine
- Bore: 5⅝ in (142.9 mm)
- Stroke: 5½ in (139.7 mm)
- Displacement: 1,640 cu in (26.9 L)
- Diameter: 45 in (1,143 mm)
- Dry weight: 900 lb (408 kg)

=== Components ===
- Valvetrain: Overhead camshaft
- Fuel system: Single Stromberg NA-U8J carburetor
- Cooling system: Air-cooled
- Reduction gear: Direct drive, right-hand tractor

=== Performance ===
- Power output: 615 hp (459 kW)
- Specific power: 0.38 hp/cu in (17 kW/L)
- Power-to-weight ratio: 0.68 hp/lb (1.13 kW/kg)

== See also ==
Related lists

- List of aircraft engines
