= Sauser P6E =

American homebuilt aircraft

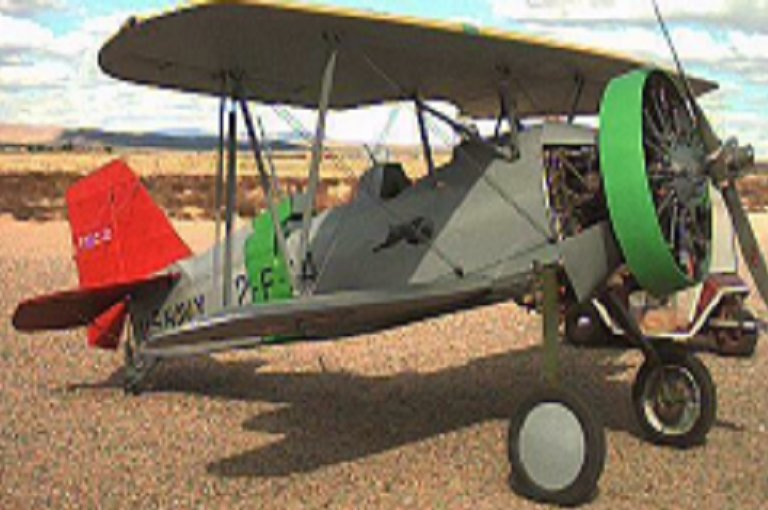
- P-6E built as a Curtiss F11C-2 Goshawk replica

General information
- Type: Homebuilt aircraft
- National origin: United States
- Designer: Donald Sauser
- Status: Plans no longer available
- Number built: 4

History
- Developed from: Curtiss P-6 Hawk

The Sauser P6E is an American homebuilt aircraft that was designed and built by Donald Sauser of Tustin, California. The aircraft is an 82% scale reproduction of the 1920s Curtiss P-6 Hawk. When it was available the aircraft was supplied in the form of plans for amateur construction by the Sauser Aircraft Company.

== Design and development ==
Like the aircraft it is patterned after, the Sauser P6E features a strut-braced biplane layout, a single-seat open cockpit with a windshield, fixed conventional landing gear with wheel pants and a single engine in tractor configuration.

The aircraft is made from welded steel tubing and wood, with its flying surfaces covered in doped aircraft fabric. Its 25.83 ft (7.9 m) span wing has a wing area of 170.0 sq ft (15.79 m^{2}). The acceptable power range is 180 to 260 hp (134 to 194 kW) and the standard engine used is a 212 hp (158 kW) Chevrolet small-block V-8 automotive conversion powerplant.

The Sauser P6E has a typical empty weight of 1,425 lb (646 kg) and a gross weight of 2,040 lb (930 kg), giving a useful load of 615 lb (279 kg). With full fuel of 27 U.S. gallons (100 L; 22 imp gal) the payload for the pilot and baggage is 453 lb (205 kg).

== Operational history ==
Sauser P6Es have been registered with the US Federal Aviation Administration under a variety of type designations, making them hard to catalog. Types registered include Sauser QC, Johnson F11C-2PJ (built as a F11C-2 replica), Wooldridge Saco P6-E Hawk and Roof Curtis Hawk P6E.

== Aircraft on display ==
- March Field Air Museum - donated by the designer's widow in 2002.

== Specifications (Sauser P6E) ==
Data from AeroCrafter

General characteristics

- Crew: one
- Length: 18.91 ft (5.76 m)
- Wingspan: 25.83 ft (7.87 m)
- Wing area: 170.0 sq ft (15.79 m^{2})
- Empty weight: 1,425 lb (646 kg)
- Gross weight: 2,040 lb (925 kg)
- Fuel capacity: 27 U.S. gallons (100 L; 22 imp gal)
- Powerplant: 1 × Chevrolet small block V-8 eight cylinder, liquid-cooled, four stroke automotive conversion engine, 212 hp (158 kW)
- Propellers: 2-bladed fixed pitch wooden

Performance

- Maximum speed: 185 mph (298 km/h, 161 kn)
- Cruise speed: 120 mph (190 km/h, 100 kn)
- Stall speed: 60 mph (97 km/h, 52 kn)
- Range: 425 mi (684 km, 369 nmi)
- Wing loading: 12.0 lb/sq ft (59 kg/m^{2})
