= Curtiss YP-20 =

Prototype biplane fighter

YP-20
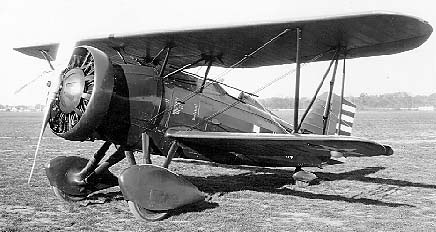
- Parked YP-20

General information
- Type: Biplane fighter
- Manufacturer: Curtiss Aeroplane and Motor Company
- Primary user: United States Army Air Service
- Number built: 1

The Curtiss YP-20 was an American biplane fighter project developed by Curtiss for the United States Army Air Service.

== Design and development ==
In 1929, three Curtiss P-11 Hawks were ordered with 600 hp (447 kW) Curtiss H-1640 Chieftain engines. These proved a failure, and before completion, the third was converted to use a 9-cylinder 575 hp (429 kW) Wright Cyclone, being completed as the YP-20. Testing with the R1820 was prolonged, so the Army's intention to promptly switch to a Curtiss V-1570 Conqueror engine and redesignate the aircraft XP-22 was dropped; another P-11 was chosen for that instead.

Except for the engine change and its Townend ring cowling, the YP-20 was not drastically different from the P-6 from which both it and the P-11 derived, though the YP-20 had more fin and less rudder area, and featured a steerable tailwheel, rather than the original skid. Later, a crankcase cover, gear strut fairings, and wheel pants were added.

In June 1931, the AAC held a competition to evaluate the P-6, P-12, XP-22, and YP-20. The XP-22 came out the winner, but the YP-20 was given a nose and landing gear graft from the XP-22, becoming the XP-6E (P-6E prototype). With the addition of a supercharger and an enclosed cockpit, it was tested as the XP-6F.

== Operators ==
United States

- United States Army Air Service

== Specifications (original YP-20) ==
Data from Curtiss Aircraft 1907–1947

General characteristics

- Crew: 1
- Length: 23 ft 0 in (7.01 m)
- Wingspan: 31 ft 6 in (9.60 m)
- Height: 9 ft 3 in (2.82 m)
- Wing area: 252 sq ft (23.4 m^{2})
- Airfoil: 'Clark Y
- Empty weight: 2,523 lb (1,144 kg)
- Gross weight: 3,231 lb (1,466 kg)
- Powerplant: 1 × Wright R-1820-9 Cyclone 9-cylinder air-cooled radial piston engine, 650 hp (480 kW)
- Propellers: 2-bladed fixed-pitch propeller

Performance

- Maximum speed: 188.6 mph (303.5 km/h, 163.9 kn)
- Cruise speed: 150 mph (240 km/h, 130 kn)
- Range: 237 mi (381 km, 206 nmi)
- Service ceiling: 27,800 ft (8,500 m)
- Rate of climb: 2,600 ft/min (13 m/s)

Armament

- Guns: 2 × fixed forward-firing 0.300 in (7.62 mm) M1919 Browning machine guns
