= MMIST CQ-10 SnowGoose =

Canadian military cargo delivery UAV

CQ-10 SnowGoose
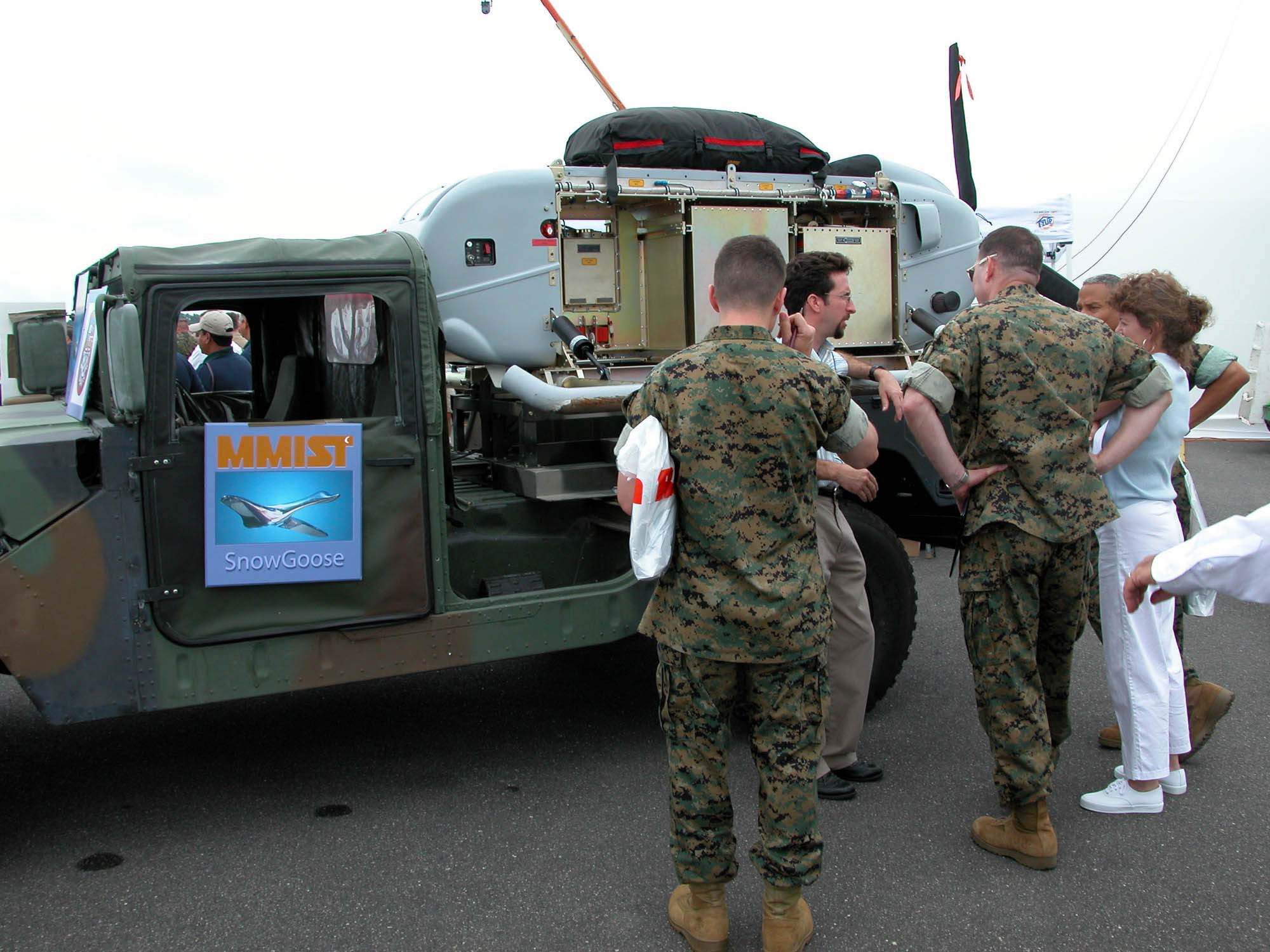
- UAV on a Humvee.

General information
- Type: Unmanned Aerial Vehicle (UAV)
- National origin: Canada
- Manufacturer: MMIST
- Primary user: United States Special Operations Command
- Number built: CQ-10A: 15 (49 planned)

History
- Introduction date: January 2005
- First flight: April 2001

The MMIST CQ-10A SnowGoose is a cargo delivery unmanned aerial vehicle with the United States Armed Forces. 15 vehicles were produced. The SnowGoose UAV is produced by the Canadian company Mist Mobility Integrated Systems Technology (MMIST).

The SnowGoose UAV is an application of MMIST's Sherpa autonomous GPS-guided parafoil delivery system and is intended for pin-point delivery of small cargo items, such as ammunition and supplies, to special forces.

== Features ==
A fully loaded Snowgoose can carry 261 kg (575 lb).

The SnowGoose was originally designed for leaflet dispensing for psychological warfare, but can support a variety of missions with its six modular cargo bays, each of which can carry pods for fuel, supplies, electronics (sensor or broadcasting) packages, and provide aerial surveillance and communications relay.

The CQ-10A uses a parafoil for lift; the CQ-10B uses an autogyro rotor for lift. The "B" version has twice the range of the "A" version. The CQ-10B can carry 1,088 kg (2,400 lb) up to 150 km (93 mi) from a central base per day (24 h), placing the loads within 30 m (100 ft) of a predesignated point, then performing near-vertical take-offs.

It is able to be launched from HMMWVs (or Humvees), and can be launched from Lockheed C-130 Hercules, Lockheed C-141 Starlifter, and Boeing C-17 Globemaster IIIs. Its first flight was in April 2001. It achieved initial operating capability in April 2005.

== Variants ==
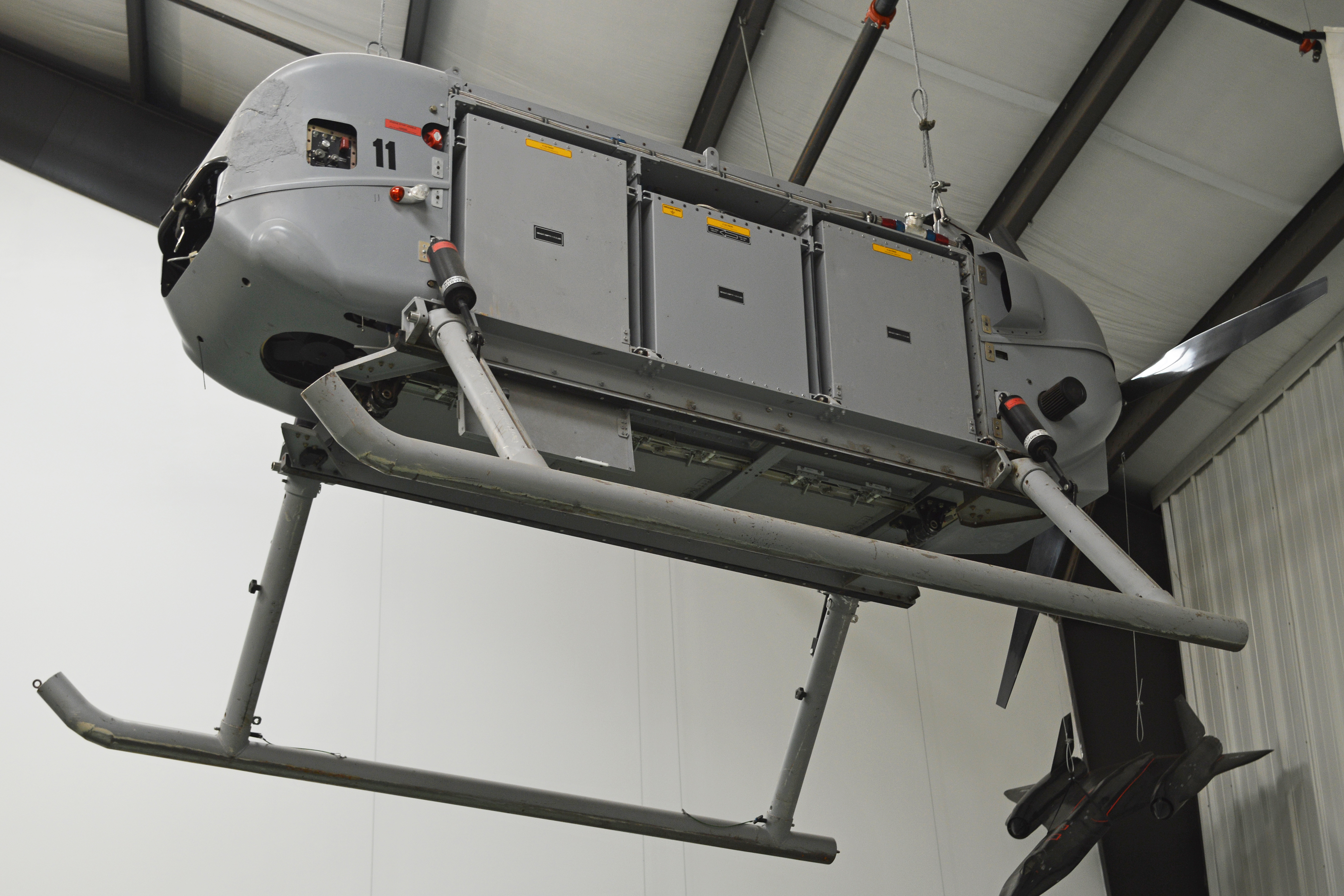
A CQ-10A at March Field Air Museum, Riverside, CA

CQ-10A
Parafoil lift.
CQ-10B
Autogyro rotor lift with increased range, V/STOL.

== Operators ==
- Canada
  - Canadian Forces - testing 2007
- United States
  - United States Special Operations Command

== Specifications (CQ-10A) ==
Data from Unmanned Aircraft Systems Roadmap 2005-2030, Office of the Security of Defense (p.24)

General characteristics

- Capacity: 575 pounds (261 kg)
- Length: 9.5 ft (2.9 m)
- Wingspan: 6.8 ft (2.1 m)
- Gross weight: 1,400 lb (635 kg)
- Fuel capacity: 91 U.S. gallons (340 L)
- Powerplant: 1 × Rotax 914 UL piston engine, 110 hp (82 kW)

Performance

- Maximum speed: 38 mph (61 km/h, 33 kn)
- Range: 180 mi (300 km, 160 nmi)
- Endurance: 19 hr (Maximum), 9-11 hr with 200 lb cargo
- Service ceiling: 18,000 ft (5,500 m)

== See also ==
- History of unmanned aerial vehicles
- Unmanned Aerial Vehicle

Related lists

- List of active United States military aircraft
