= MTC MQ-17 SpyHawk =

Cancelled Canadian unmanned aerial vehicle

XMQ-17A SpyHawk

General information
- Type: UAV
- Manufacturer: MTC Technologies
- Status: cancelled
- Primary user: U.S. Marine Corps

History
- Retired: 2008

The XMQ-17A ("SpyHawk") is an unmanned aerial vehicle built and developed by MTC Technologies which was intended to be used by the US Marine Corps in order to fulfill a need for an unmanned aerial reconnaissance capability at division level, or "Tier II". Launched from a trailer-mounted pneumatic launcher, the aircraft is powered by a single Honda GX-57 gasoline-fueled piston engine. The SpyHawk purchase was canceled in January 2008, after MTC Technologies was purchased by BAE Systems.

== Specifications (XMQ-17A) ==
Data from

General characteristics

- Crew: 0 (UAV)
- Wingspan: 12 ft 9 in (3.89 m)
- Gross weight: 85 lb (39 kg)
- Powerplant: 1 × Honda GX-57

Performance

- Maximum speed: 103 mph (167 km/h, 90 kn)
- Cruise speed: 52 mph (83 km/h, 45 kn)
- Range: 50 mi (90 km, 43 nmi)
- Endurance: 16 hours
- Service ceiling: 15,000 ft (4,500 m)
