= Thomas-Morse XP-13 Viper =

Prototype biplane fighter

XP-13
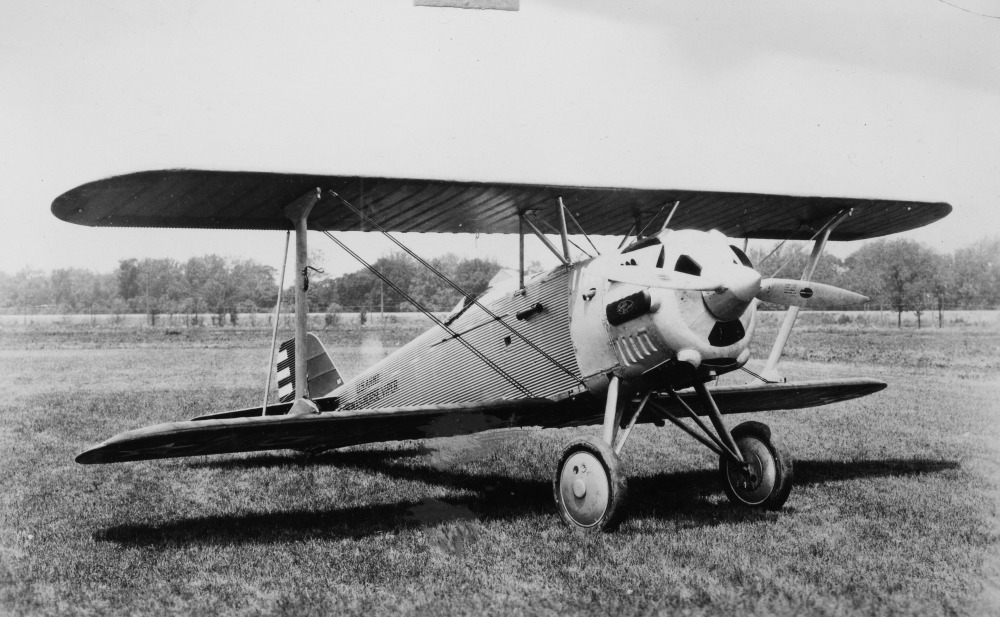
- Thomas-Morse XP-13

General information
- Type: Fighter
- Manufacturer: Thomas-Morse
- Designer: B. Douglas Thomas
- Primary user: United States Army Air Service
- Number built: 1

History
- Introduction date: June 1929

The XP-13 Viper was a prototype biplane fighter aircraft designed by the American company Thomas-Morse Aircraft Corporation. The airplane was delivered to the United States Army in 1929, but they did not adopt it.

== Design and development ==
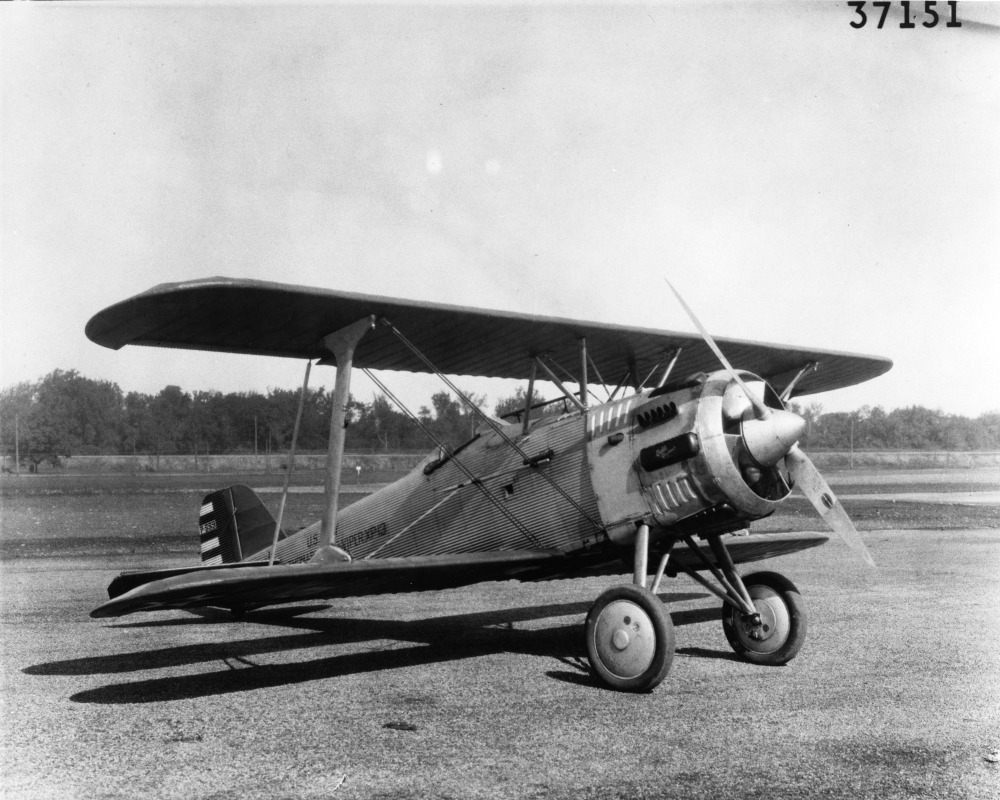
The XP-13, powered by the Curtiss H-1640-1 Chieftain engine

This aircraft was one of several B. Douglas Thomas designs built in hopes of a production contract from the Army, following the successful Thomas-Morse MB-3 of 1919. Financed by the company, and named the "Viper", it was officially purchased by the Army in June 1929 and designated "XP-13".

The XP-13 fuselage had a corrugated aluminum skin built over a metal frame; the flying surfaces were also metal-framed, but covered with the traditional fabric. While designed to use the 600 hp Curtiss H-1640-1 Chieftain engine, (a novel 12-cylinder two-row air-cooled radial with the rear cylinders directly behind the front cylinders rather than staggered as normal in a two-row radial) for which the XP-13 incorporated a complex system of baffles to direct cooling air over the engine, the engine simply would not stay cool enough, and in September 1930 it was replaced with a Pratt & Whitney SR1340C Wasp of 450 hp. Ironically, the lower-power engine actually resulted in a speed increase of 15 mph, at least partly because of the weight savings.

In the end, the Army decided against production, Thomas-Morse was acquired by Consolidated Aircraft, and the prototype was lost to an inflight fire.

== Variants ==
XP-13
Prototype, serial number 29-453 with 600 hp (448 kW) Curtiss H-1640-1 Chieftain hex engine

XP-13A
The XP-13 modified with a 525 hp (391 kW) Pratt & Whitney SR-1340-C enclosed in a NACA cowling, along with a revised fin and rudder

XP-14
This designation was used for a proposed Curtiss version of the Viper with the Curtiss H-1640-1 Chieftain hex engine

== Operators ==
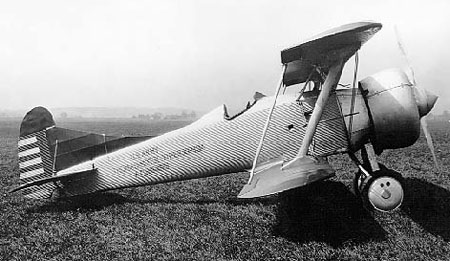
Side view of P&W-powered XP-13A variant showing corrugated aluminum skin

United States

- United States Army Air Service

== Specifications (XP-13 (Chieftain engine)) ==
Data from William Green; Gordon Swanborough (1994). The Complete Book of Fighters: An Illustrated Encyclopedia of Every Fighter Aircraft Built and Flown. Salamander. ISBN 978-0-86101-643-3.

General characteristics

- Crew: 1
- Length: 23 ft 6 in (7.16 m)
- Wingspan: 28 ft 0 in (8.53 m)
- Height: 8 ft 5 in (2.56 m)
- Wing area: 189 sq ft (17.6 m^{2})
- Empty weight: 2,262 lb (1,026 kg)
- Gross weight: 3,256 lb (1,477 kg)
- Powerplant: 1 × Curtiss H-1640-1 Chieftain 12-cylinder two-row air-cooled radial engine, 600 hp (448 kW)

Performance

- Maximum speed: 150 kn (172 mph, 277 km/h) (at sea level)
- Cruise speed: 113 kn (130 mph, 209 km/h)
- Range: 168 nmi (193 mi, 312 km)
- Service ceiling: 20,775 ft (6,300 m)
- Rate of climb: 1,700 ft/min (8.6 m/s)

Armament
none

== See also ==
Related lists

- List of fighter aircraft
- List of military aircraft of the United States
