= Rotorcraft XR-11 =

American helicopter

XR-11/XH-11
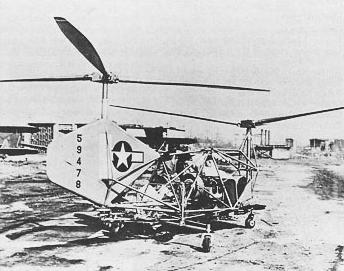

General information
- Type: Twin-rotor helicopter
- National origin: United States
- Manufacturer: Rotorcraft Corporation
- Designer: Gilbert Magill
- Status: Cancelled
- Primary user: U.S. Army Air Force
- Number built: 1

History
- First flight: 1947

The Rotorcraft XR-11, known by the company as the X-2 Dragonfly, was an American two-seat lightweight helicopter built in the 1940s for evaluation by the United States Air Force by the Rotorcraft Corporation of Glendale, California.

== Design and development ==
The XR-11 was a powered by a 100 hp (75 kW) Continental A100 piston engine driving two three-bladed contra-rotating rotors. Only one was built and first flown in 1947, it was re-designated the XH-11 in 1948, the project was later cancelled.

== Variants ==
XR-11
United States Air Force designation later changed to XH-11, one built.

== Operators ==
United States

- United States Air Force

== Specifications ==
General characteristics

- Crew: 2
- Length: 15 ft 0 in (4.57 m)
- Height: 7 ft 6 in (2.29 m)
- Empty weight: 899 lb (408 kg)
- Max takeoff weight: 1,349 lb (612 kg)
- Powerplant: 1 × Continental A100 , 100 hp (75 kW)
- Main rotor diameter: 2 × 18 ft 0 in (5.49 m)

== See also ==
Related lists

- List of military aircraft of the United States
- List of rotorcraft
- Tandem rotors
