= Curtiss P-6 Hawk =

Fighter aircraft in use by the US Army Air Corps 1929-1937

P-6 Hawk
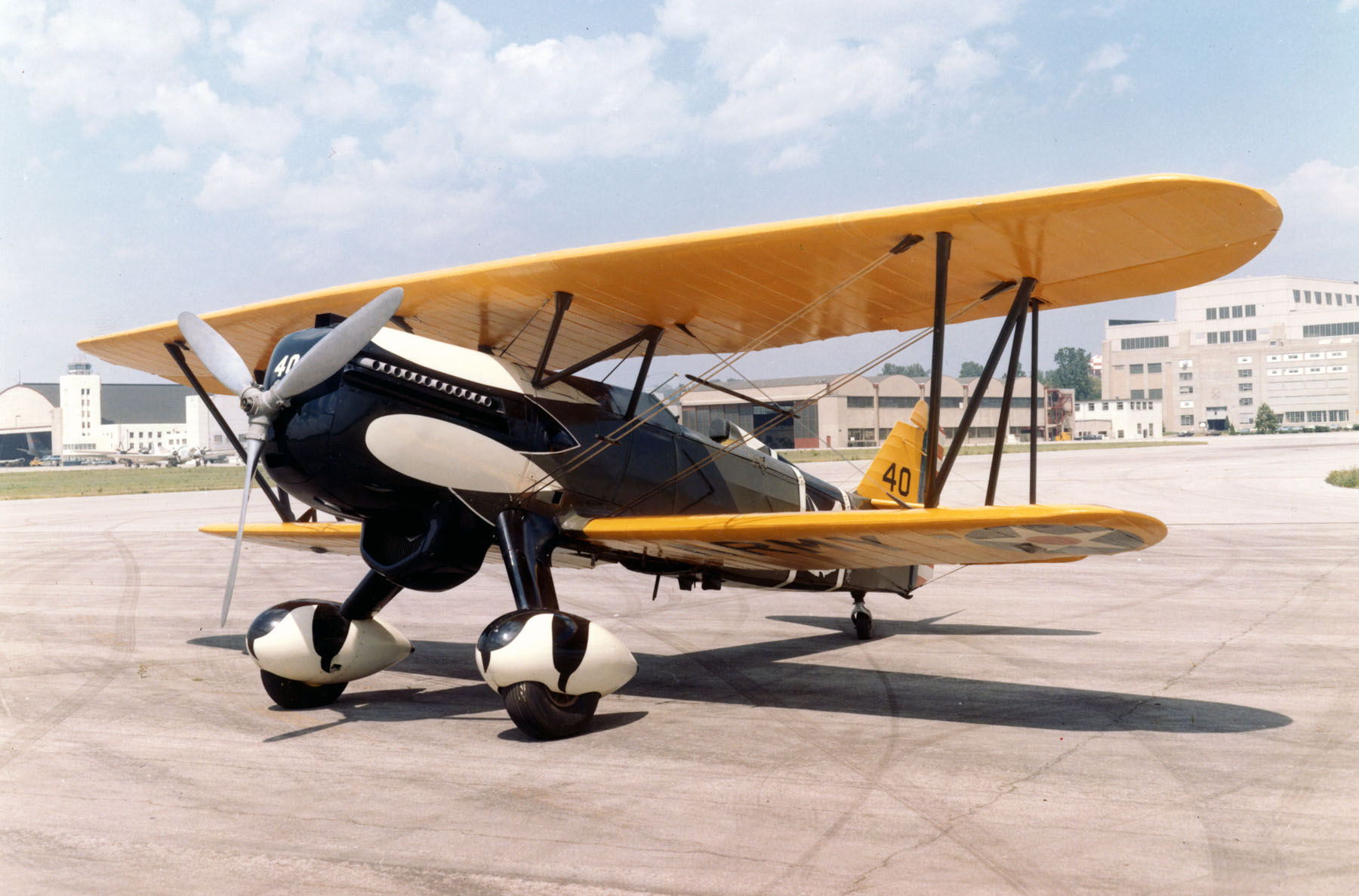
- Curtiss P-6E Hawk at the National Museum of the U.S. Air Force

General information
- Type: Fighter
- National origin: United States
- Manufacturer: Curtiss Aeroplane and Motor Company
- Primary users: United States Army Air Corps Republic of China Air Force
- Number built: 70 including modified P-1s

History
- Introduction date: 1927
- Developed from: Curtiss P-1 Hawk

The Curtiss P-6 Hawk is a single-engine biplane fighter designed and produced by the American aviation manufacturer Curtiss Aeroplane and Motor Company. It was the final biplane fighter to be procured in quantity by the United States Army Air Corps (USAAC).

A fast and highly maneuverable aircraft for its time, the Hawk was designed during the mid-1920s and introduced into service with the USAAC towards the end of the decade. Furthermore, several export customers for the type emerged, the largest being the 50 aircraft that were delivered to the Republic of China Air Force; others included the Cuban Air Force, the Royal Netherlands East Indies Army Air Force and the Bolivian Air Force. The USAAC operated its Hawks into the late 1930s although the type had been rendered obsolete by newer all-metal monoplane fighters. Withdrawn aircraft were typically scrapped or sold as surplus; by the twenty-first century, only one original Hawk has been preserved on static display.

== Design and development ==
Work on what would become the P-6 Hawk commenced during the mid-1920s. Based on the preceding Curtiss P-1 Hawk (Curtiss Model 34), the Hawk's construction used a combination of fabric-covered steel and wood. The Hawk was a relatively heavily-armed fighter for the era, being furnished with a pair of 0.30 in (7.6 mm) caliber machine guns. Power was typically provided by a Curtiss V-1570 Conqueror engine, which could easily produce 600 hp and facilitated the aircraft's maximum speed of 204 mph along with its cruising speed of 167 mph. In spite of its open cockfit, the Hawk had an altitude ceiling of 24,400 feet. To provide sufficient cooling for the Conqueror engine, it was necessary to fit a relatively large radiator to the aircraft, which generated particularly low levels of drag. The coolent used in these radiators was not uniform, water being used in some and ethylene glycol on others.

In 1929, the United States Army Air Corps (USAAC) placed an initial order for 18 Hawks as service test aircraft. While it was procured in various configurations, the Hawk was never produced in larger numbers; this outcome has been attibuted to the relatively high unit cost of roughly $13,000. As a consiquence of the Great Depression, the USAAC's budget was resticted by wider government austerity practices, under which conditions the procurement of large numbers of fighters was unrealistic. despite the low volume, the Hawk stayed in production for almost a decade.

Most of the service test aircraft would be rebuilt into the more capable P-6D. The next model in the series, originally designated Y1P-22 and briefly P-6C before the final designation of P-6E, would be the definitive variant of the type. It featured a redesigned nose and a single-strut undercarriage.

== Operational history ==
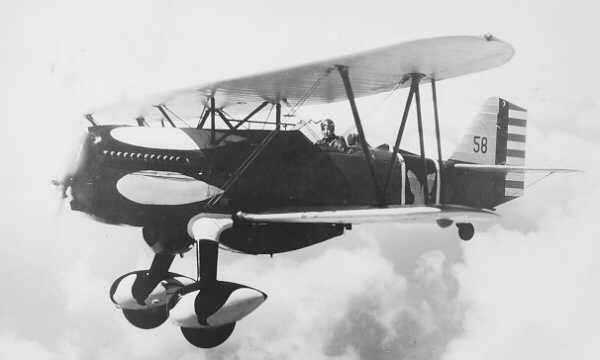
Curtiss P-6E Hawk of the 17th Pursuit Squadron

In early display of the type's capable performance, the XP-6 prototype took second place in the 1927 U.S. National Air Races while the XP-6A (which was equipped with wing surface radiators) took first place, the latter having attained a maximum speed of 201 mph (323 km/h) during the race.

The P-6 was flown in a variety of paint schemes depending on the squadron, the most famous being the "Snow Owl" markings of the 17th Pursuit Squadron based at Selfridge Field near Detroit, Michigan.

The P-6Es served between 1932 and 1937 with the 1st Pursuit Group (17th and 94th PS) at Selfridge, and with the 8th Pursuit Group (33rd PS) at Langley Field, Virginia. Numerous accidents claimed at least 27 of the 46 aircraft delivered. By the mid 1930s, the type was being increasingly eclipsed by a new generation of all-metal monoplane fighters. Accordingly, as the P-6Es aged it was decided that, instead of receiving depot overhauls, the type wwas allowed to wear out in service, the individual airframes either being scrapped or sold as surplus. At least one aircraft survived into 1942 in United States Army Air Forces service. There is no known incident of the type having ever fired its guns in anger.

In 1932, Capt. Ruben C. Moffat flew a P-6 converted with a supercharged Conqueror engine on a record-breaking flight. Moffat flew from Dayton, Ohio to Washington, D.C. at a speed of approximately 266 mph, at an altitude of 25,000 ft.

== Variants ==
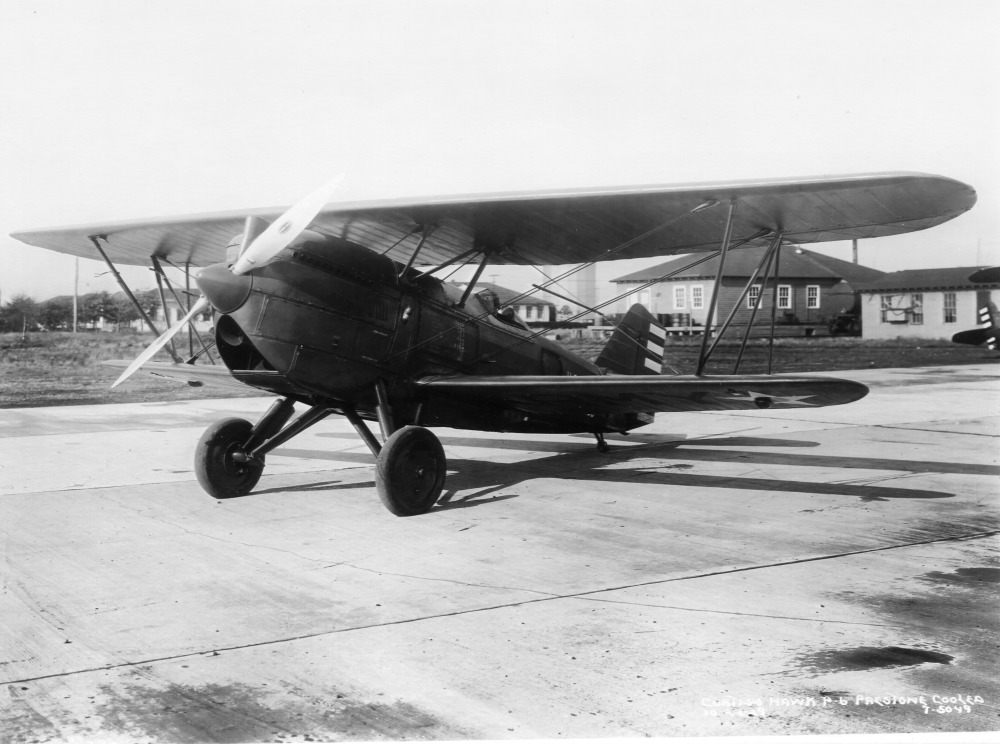
Curtiss P-6A Hawk, with deeper fuselage and new oleo-pneumatic landing gear

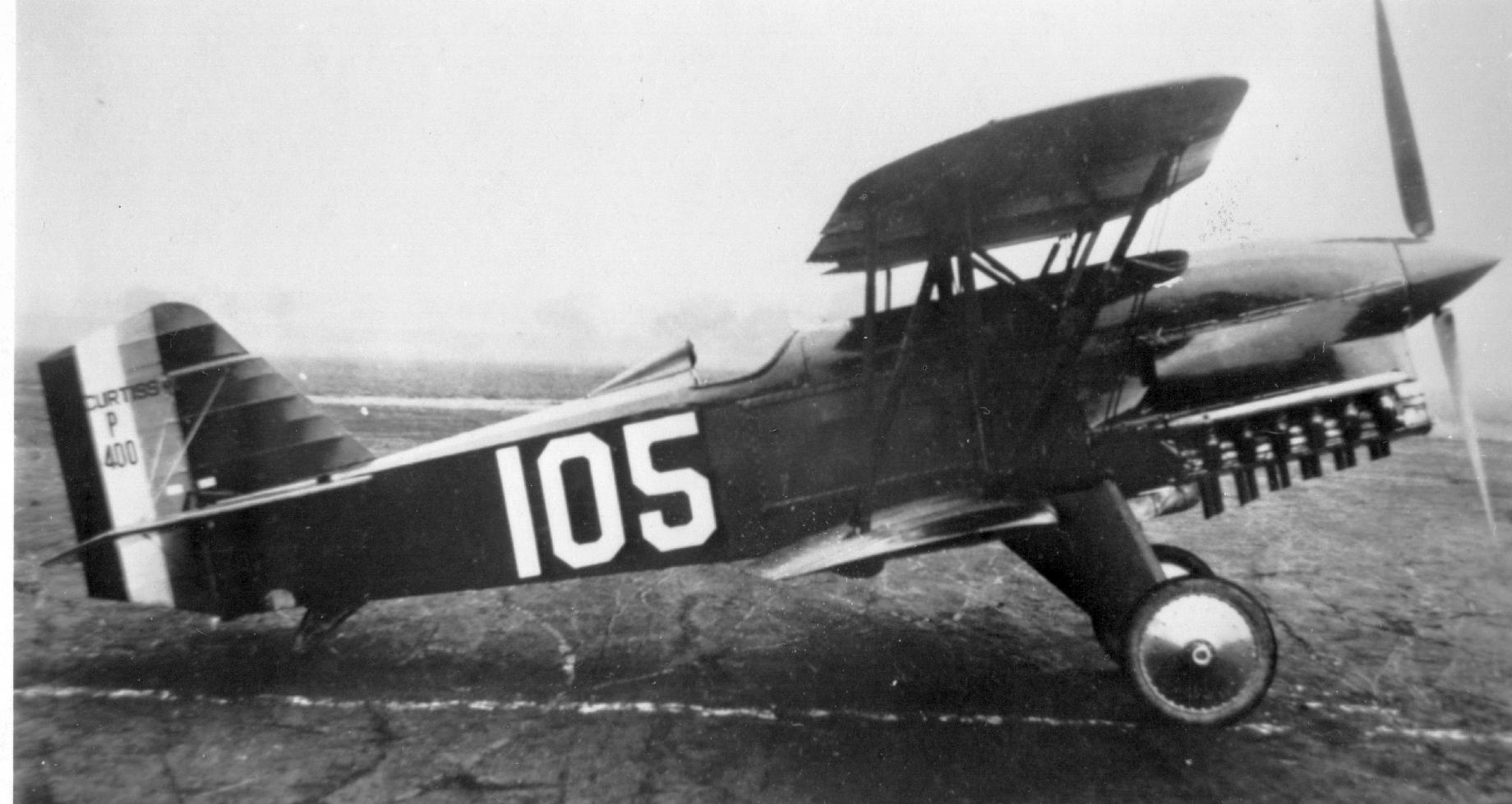
The XP-17

XP-6
Model 34P, modified from a P-1 with a Curtiss V-1570-17 Conqueror engine
XP-6A
Model 34K, same as XP-6 but with untapered wings and wing radiators to reduce drag
P-6A
18 ordered by the U.S. Army, nine were fitted with Prestone- rather than water-cooled V-1570 engines
XP-6B
P-1 converted to take the V-1670 engine
P-6C
cancelled
XP-6D
XP-6B converted to take a turbocharged V-1570-C
P-6D
P-6As, (six of the seven surviving), re-engined in 1932 with turbocharged V-1570-C installed in 1932
XP-6E
Model 35, also designated Y1P-22, ordered in July 1931 as P-6E prototype
P-6E
46 delivered in 1931–1932, equipped the 17th and 33rd Pursuit Squadrons
XP-6F
Modified XP-6E with a supercharger and an enclosed cockpit
XP-6G
P-6E with a V-1570F

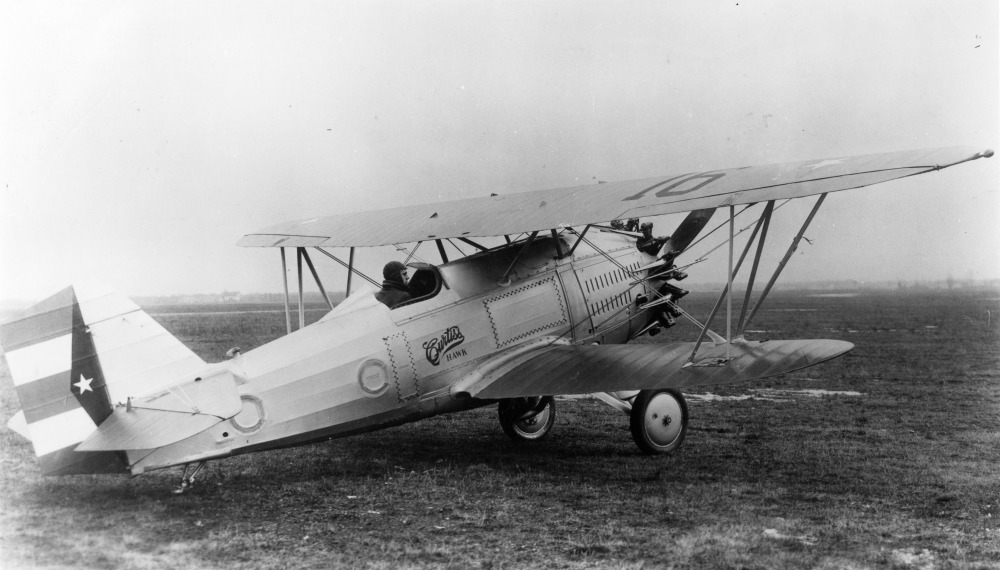
Curtiss P-6S Cuban Hawk

XP-6H
P-6E with 4 × .30 in (7.62 mm) machine guns mounted in the wings
P-6S
Hawk I, three sold to Cuba with the 450 hp (336 kW) Pratt & Whitney R-1340 Wasp radial, and one sold to Japan as the Japan Hawk with the V-1570 inverted Vee piston engine
P-11
Three ordered with the Curtiss H-1640 Chieftain engine of 600 hp (447 kW), two were completed with the V-1570 and redesignated P-6D
XP-17
P-1 used as a testbed for the experimental Wright V-1470 air-cooled inverted vee
YP-20
P-11 converted with a Wright Cyclone radial

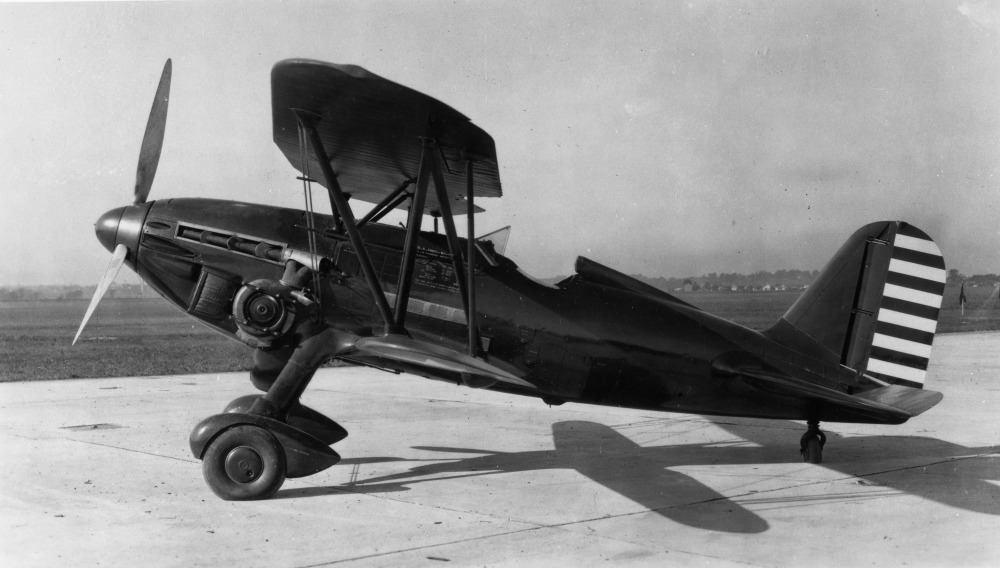
Curtiss XP-23

XP-21
Two conversions of the XP-3A used to test the 300 hp (224 kW) Pratt & Whitney R-985 Wasp Junior radial, one became the XP-21A when modified with the R-975, and the other was converted to the P-1F standard
XP-22
Temporary designation for a P-6A used to test new radiator installations for the V-1570-23 and converted back to a P-6A
XP-23
Model 63, unfinished P-6E with light alloy monocoque fuselage, improved tail, and a turbocharged G1V-1570C with a geared propeller and the turbocharger removed. Later redesignated YP-23

== Operators ==
China

- Republic of China Air Force operated 50 Hawk II.

Cuba

- Cuban Air Force received three P-6S fighters with the 450 hp (336 kW) Wasp radial engine.

Japan

- Japan bought one P-6S, possibly updated with a Conqueror engine.

Dutch East Indies

- Royal Netherlands East Indies Army Air Force received eight examples of a P-6D with the Conqueror engine in 1930, another six were license-built by Aviolanda in 1931 and sent to Dutch East Indies as well. Three P-6 were lost before war: two in midair collision on 27 February 1936 and one probably after crash-landing 5 February 1935.

USA

- United States Army Air Corps

Bolivia

- Bolivian Air Force used the P-6S during the Chaco War. On 22 December 1932, a Hawk from Fortín Vitriones attacked the Paraguayan gunboat ARP Tacuary which was anchored at Bahía Negra near (20.23°S 58.16694°W)

== Surviving aircraft ==
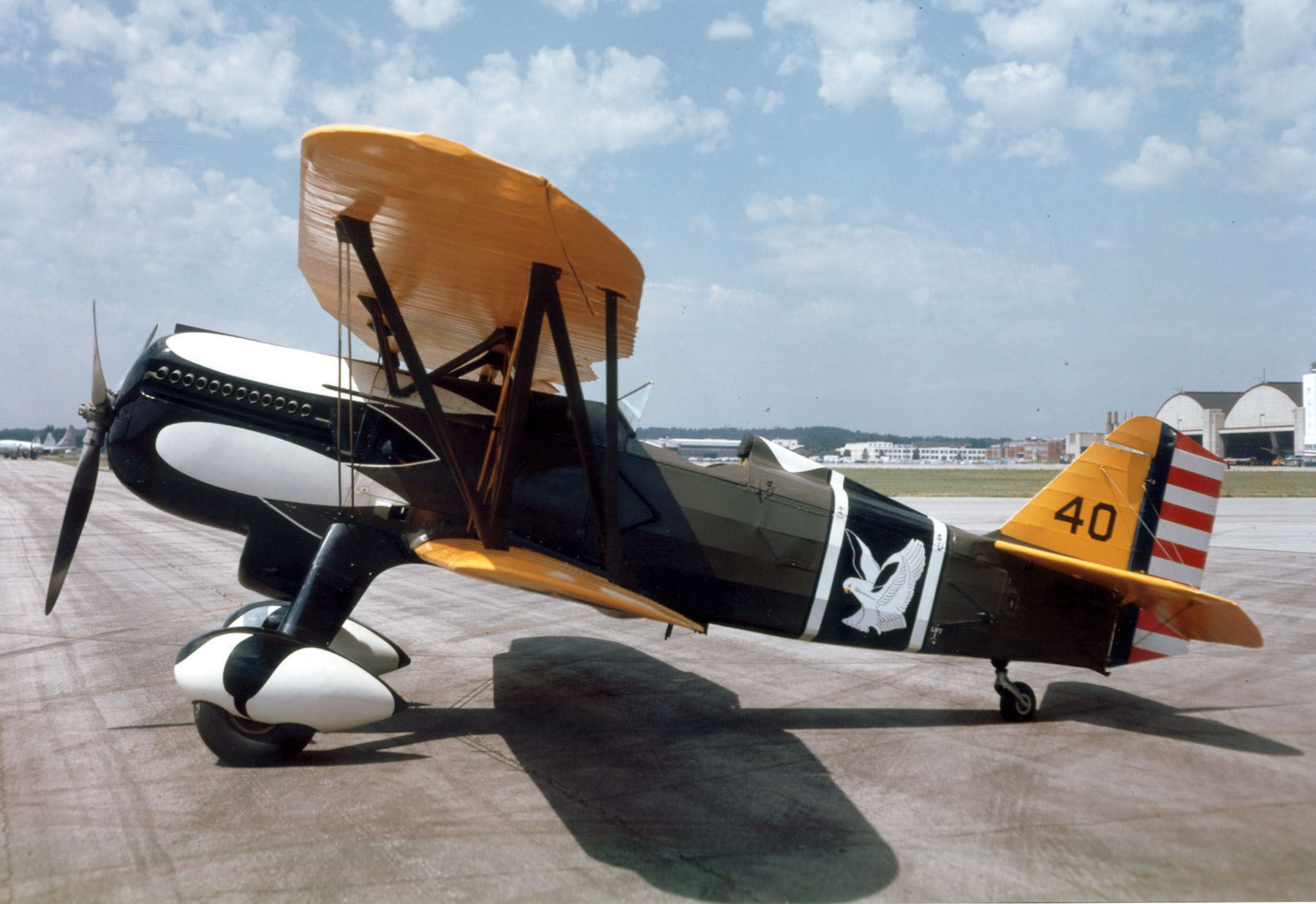
Curtiss P-6E Hawk at the National Museum of the United States Air Force

A single P-6E survives. The aircraft was donated to the Smithsonian National Air and Space Museum by Mr. Edward S. Perkins of Anniston, Alabama and restored by the School of Aeronautics at Purdue University. It is on indefinite loan and display at the National Museum of the United States Air Force at Wright-Patterson AFB near Dayton, Ohio. Originally s/n 32-261 and assigned to the 33rd Pursuit Squadron, it was dropped from records at Tampa Field, Florida, in September 1939. It was restored and marked as 32-240 of 17th Pursuit Squadron, missing on a flight over Lake Erie on 24 September 1932.

== Specifications (P-6E) ==
Data from Curtiss Aircraft 1907–1947

General characteristics

- Crew: 1
- Length: 22 ft 7 in (6.88 m)
- Wingspan: 31 ft 6 in (9.60 m)
- Height: 8 ft 11 in (2.72 m)
- Wing area: 252 sq ft (23.4 m^{2})
- Airfoil: Clark Y
- Empty weight: 2,715 lb (1,232 kg)
- Gross weight: 3,436 lb (1,559 kg)
- Powerplant: 1 × Curtiss V-1750C Conqueror V-12 liquid-cooled piston engine, 700 hp (520 kW)
- Propellers: 3-bladed propeller

Performance

- Maximum speed: 193 mph (311 km/h, 168 kn)
- Cruise speed: 165 mph (266 km/h, 143 kn)
- Range: 244 mi (393 km, 212 nmi)
- Service ceiling: 23,900 ft (7,300 m)
- Rate of climb: 2,480 ft/min (12.6 m/s)

Armament

- Guns: 2 × 0.30 in (7.6 mm) machine guns

== See also ==
Related development

- Sauser P6E, a homebuilt 82% replica also known as the P6E-QC.

Related lists

- List of military aircraft of the United States
- List of fighter aircraft
