= Curtiss XP-22 Hawk =

Experimental biplane fighter

XP-22 Hawk
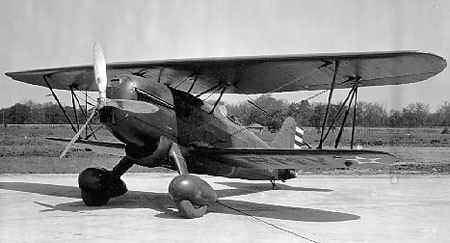

General information
- Type: Experimental biplane fighter
- Manufacturer: Curtiss Aeroplane and Motor Company
- Primary user: United States Army Air Forces
- Number built: 1

History
- Variant: Curtiss P-6 Hawk

The Curtiss XP-22 Hawk was a 1930s American experimental biplane fighter built by Curtiss for evaluation by the United States Army Air Service.

== Design and development ==
In 1929, the AAC ordered three P-11 Hawks for testing of the 600 hp (447 kW) H-1640 Chieftain engine. This engine proved a failure, and before completion, one of the three was converted to use a 9-cylinder 575 hp (429 kW) Cyclone, being completed as the YP-20. Testing with the R-1820 was prolonged, so the Army acquired another of the three P-11s, instead. This became the XP-22.

A number of changes were made for installing the 700 hp (520 kW) Curtiss V-1570 Conqueror engine. The radiator was relocated, a new cowl was fitted, and the tail was given more fin and less rudder area, and featured a steerable tailwheel, rather than the original skid. For these changes, Curtiss charged only US$1.

During testing, the XP-22 underwent a number of alterations and improvements, including a change from a three-strut landing gear to a single streamlined strut, later fitted with wheel pants. Fillets were added where struts joined the wing and the tail was briefly reduced in area, to P-6 standard. The XP-22 was also the Army's first fighter capable of 200 mph (320 km/h), achieving 202 mph (325 km/h).

== Operational history ==
In June 1931, the AAC held a competition to evaluate the P-6, P-12, YP-20, and XP-22. The XP-22 came out the winner, earning a contract for 45 aircraft as the Y1P-22. Following the trials, the XP-22 donated a nose and landing gear graft to the YP-20, which became the XP-6E, and the 45 production aircraft were completed to this standard.

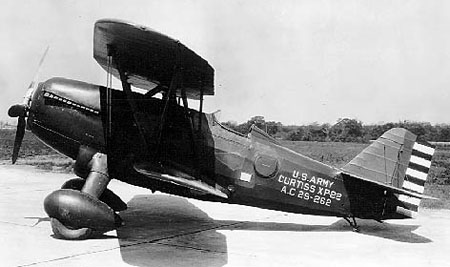

== Operators ==
United States

- United States Army Air Forces

== Specifications (XP-22 Hawk) ==
Data from U.S.Fighters, Curtiss Aircraft 1907–1947

General characteristics

- Crew: 1
- Length: 23 ft 7 in (7.19 m)
- Wingspan: 31 ft 6 in (9.60 m)
- Height: 8 ft 10 in (2.69 m)
- Airfoil: Clark Y
- Empty weight: 2,597 lb (1,178 kg)
- Max takeoff weight: 3,354 lb (1,521 kg)
- Powerplant: 1 × Curtiss V-1570-23 Conqueror V-12 water-cooled piston engine, 575 hp (429 kW)
- Propellers: 2-bladed propeller

Performance

- Maximum speed: 202 mph (325 km/h, 176 kn)
- Service ceiling: 26,500 ft (8,100 m)

Armament

- Guns: 2x 0.300 in (7.62 mm) machine-guns in the fuselage sides
