= T-48 MPATS =

The T-48TS was a U.S. Navy aircraft project, intended to replace the T-39 Sabreliner as part of the Undergraduate Military Flight Officer (UMFO) Multi-Place Aircraft Training System (MPATS).

Planned by the Naval Air Systems Command (NAVAIR), the T-48 Training System (T-48TS) was planned to consist of the aircraft, radar, a ground-based training system and curriculum, and life cycle support, initially for two years' time. Solicited for proposals in 2003, in 2004 the programme was deferred for further study.

The T-48TS is not to be confused with the earlier Cessna T-48, this being a rare case of a reused designation in the US system.
