= Philip S. Davidson =

US Navy four-star admiral

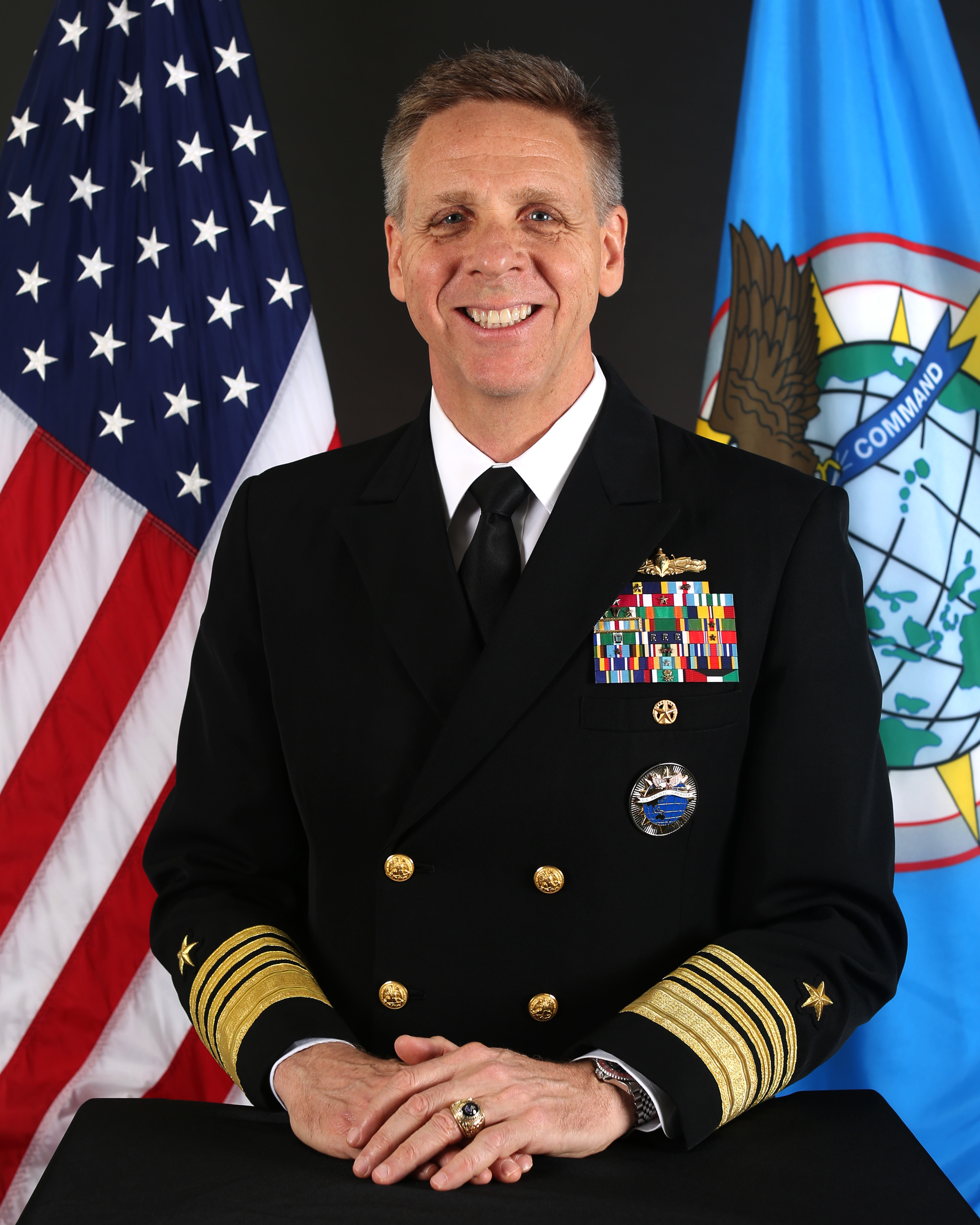
- Official portrait, 2018
- Born: August 24, 1960 (age 66); Cincinnati, Ohio, U.S.
- Spouse: Tracy Davidson
- Relatives: Lara Davidson (daughter)
- Military career
- Allegiance: United States
- Branch: United States Navy
- Service years: 1982–2021
- Rank: Admiral
- Commands: United States Indo-Pacific Command; United States Fleet Forces Command; United States Sixth Fleet; Carrier Strike Group 8 USS Gettysburg; USS Taylor
- Conflicts: Gulf War
- Awards: Defense Distinguished Service Medal; Navy Distinguished Service Medal (2); Defense Superior Service Medal (2); Legion of Merit (6)

Philip Scot Davidson (born August 24, 1960) is a retired four-star admiral in the United States Navy who last served as the 25th commander of United States Indo-Pacific Command from May 30, 2018 to April 30, 2021. He previously served as the commander of United States Fleet Forces Command and United States Naval Forces Northern Command from 2014 to 2018. Davidson is from St. Louis, Missouri, and is a 1982 graduate of the United States Naval Academy. He retired from the U.S. Navy effective May 1, 2021.

On April 24, 2018, the Senate Armed Services Committee confirmed Davidson to succeed Admiral Harry B. Harris Jr. as the commander of United States Pacific Command. The change of command ceremony happened on May 30, 2018. On that same day, United States Pacific Command was renamed to United States Indo-Pacific Command. When Admiral Kurt W. Tidd retired, Davidson received the title of "Old Salt", conferred upon the longest-serving surface warfare officer in the U.S. Navy. Davidson relinquished the title to Admiral Christopher W. Grady upon his retirement.

== Naval career ==
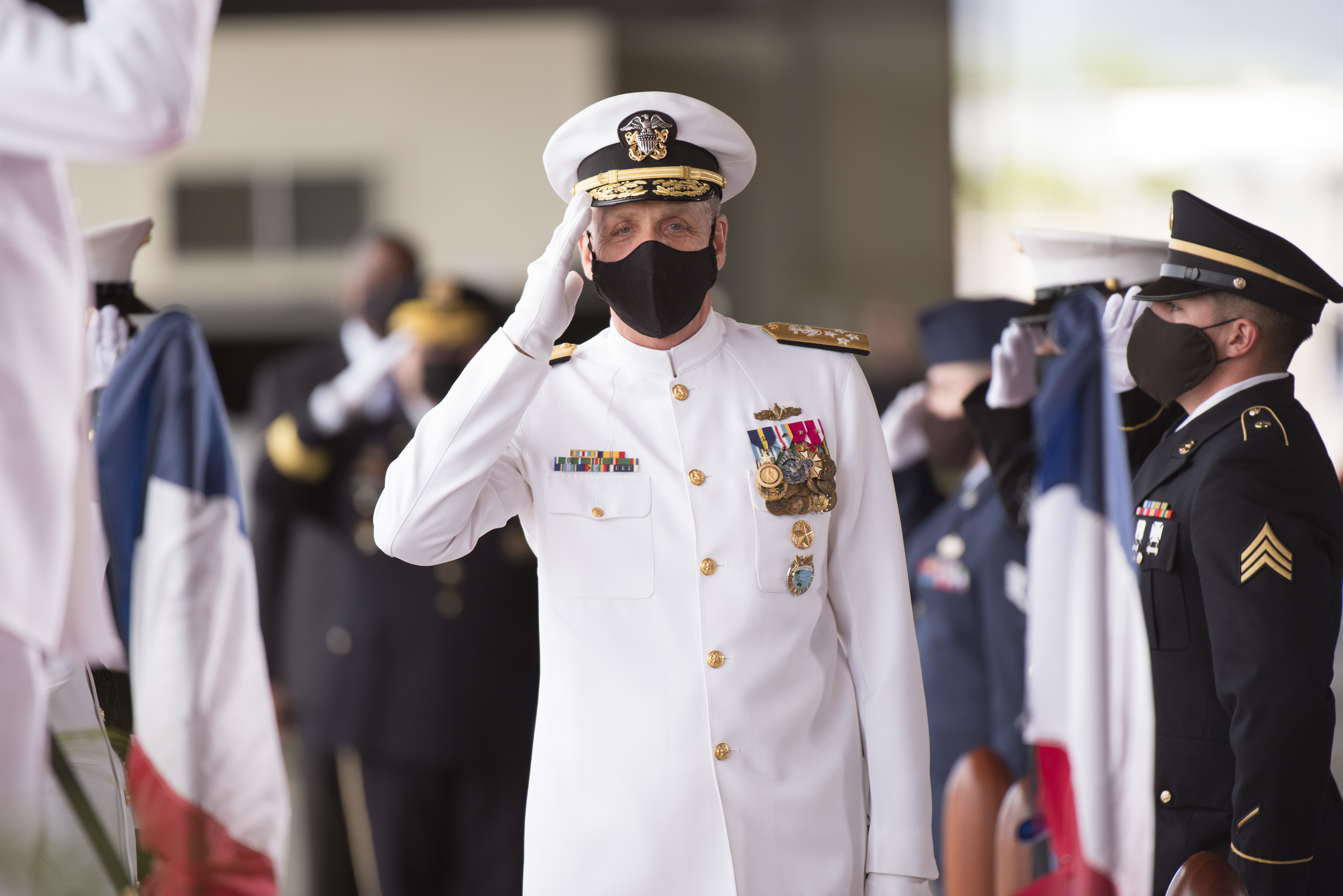
Admiral Davidson is piped aboard during the INDOPACOM change of command ceremony. He would retire from active duty the following day, 1 May 2021.

A surface warfare officer, Davidson has deployed across the globe in frigates, destroyers, cruisers, and aircraft carriers. Davidson's previous command assignments include Carrier Strike Group 8 (Eisenhower Carrier Strike Group), USS Gettysburg, and USS Taylor. He also served as the commander of United States Sixth Fleet and the commander of Naval Striking and Support Forces NATO, while simultaneously serving as the deputy commander of United States Naval Forces Europe – Naval Forces Africa.

Ashore, Davidson has served in fleet, interagency, and joint tours as a flag officer; he was previously the director of maritime operations at United States Fleet Forces Command, the senior military advisor to the special representative for Afghanistan and Pakistan (SRAP) at the State Department, and the deputy director for strategy and policy in the J-5 directorate of the Joint Staff. He served earlier in his career in policy, strategy, and operations billets on multiple tours with the U.S. Pacific Fleet staff, the Navy staff, and the Joint Staff, and as the Navy’s military aide to the Vice President of the United States.

Davidson is a distinguished graduate of the United States Naval War College. He has a Master of Arts in national security and strategic studies and a Bachelor of Science in physics.

== Role in the USS Roosevelt coronavirus outbreak ==
On March 5, 2020, Davidson ordered the aircraft carrier USS Theodore Roosevelt to conduct its long-scheduled visit to Da Nang, Vietnam. The port call was politically important, to show United States military strength in a region increasingly unnerved by Beijing's growing territorial claims in the South China Sea. However, nearly three weeks prior, on February 14, the United States Navy had ordered all ships in the Indo-Pacific region that had made port calls to quarantine at sea for at least 14 days, the maximum incubation period for the novel coronavirus. The navy also directed the Seventh Fleet headquarters in Yokosuka, Japan to screen everyone accessing the fleet's warships and aircraft. Davidson chose to accept the risk of possible coronavirus infections, and allow the visit to proceed.

Within days of completing the port call, sailors aboard the Roosevelt began testing positive for the coronavirus. By April 13, nearly 600 sailors had tested positive, with one death, 4,000 sailors had been evacuated from the ship, and the ship's commander, Captain Brett Crozier, had been relieved of command.

== Davidson window ==
During his final testimony before the United States Senate Committee on Armed Services on March 9, 2021, Davidson warned that China posed a manifest threat to Taiwan "in the next six years," stating: "Taiwan is clearly one of their ambitions before then. And I think the threat is manifest during this decade, in fact, in the next six years." This assessment became known as the "Davidson window," a strategic concept referring to the timeframe during which China would develop sufficient military capabilities to attempt control of Taiwan. The concept has since become central to U.S. defense planning in the Indo-Pacific and influenced Congressional authorization of $7.1 billion for the Pacific Deterrence Initiative.

== Awards and decorations ==

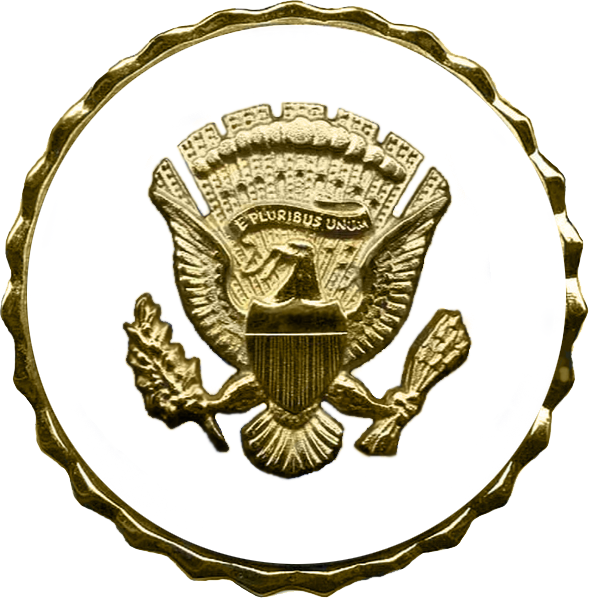

Surface Warfare Officer Pin
| Defense Distinguished Service Medal | Navy Distinguished Service Medal with one gold award star | |
| Defense Superior Service Medal w/ 1 bronze oak leaf cluster | Legion of Merit w/ 1 silver award star | Meritorious Service Medal w/ 1 award star |
| Joint Service Commendation Medal | Navy and Marine Corps Commendation Medal w/ 2 award stars and Combat V | Navy and Marine Corps Achievement Medal |
| Combat Action Ribbon | Joint Meritorious Unit Award | Navy Unit Commendation |
| Navy Meritorious Unit Commendation | Coast Guard Meritorious Unit Commendation with "O" Device | Navy E Ribbon w/ 3 Battle E devices |
| Superior Honor Award Certificate | National Defense Service Medal w/ 1 bronze service star | Armed Forces Expeditionary Medal w/ 1 service star |
| Southwest Asia Service Medal w/ 2 service stars | Global War on Terrorism Expeditionary Medal | Global War on Terrorism Service Medal |
| Navy Sea Service Deployment Ribbon w/ 6 service stars | Coast Guard Special Operations Service Ribbon | Order of the Rising Sun, 1st grade (Japan) |
| Order of National Security Merit, Tongil Medal (Republic of Korea) | Kuwait Liberation Medal (Saudi Arabia) | Kuwait Liberation Medal (Kuwait) |
Command at Sea insignia
United States Indo-Pacific Command Badge
Vice Presidential Service Badge

Military offices
| Preceded by Kurt W. Tidd | Commander of Carrier Strike Group 8; 20??–2011 | Succeeded by Michael C. Manazir |
| Preceded by Frank Craig Pandolfe | Commander of the United States Sixth Fleet; 2013–2014 | Succeeded by James G. Foggo III |
| Preceded by William E. Gortney | Commander of the United States Fleet Forces Command; 2014–2018 | Succeeded by Christopher W. Grady |
| Preceded by Harry B. Harris Jr. as Commander of the United States Pacific Command | Commander of the United States Indo-Pacific Command; 2018–2021 | Succeeded by John C. Aquilino |
