= Sea Ghost =

Sea Ghost may refer to:

- "Sea Ghost", a 2003 song by the Unicorns from Who Will Cut Our Hair When We're Gone?
- Lockheed Sea Ghost, a proposed unmanned combat airplane by Lockheed
- The Sea Ghost, a 1931 American film by William Nigh

== See also ==
- Funayūrei, sea ghosts in Japanese mythology
- Shōjō, a sea spirit in Japanese mythology
