= Old salt =

Naval term for a sailor and storyteller

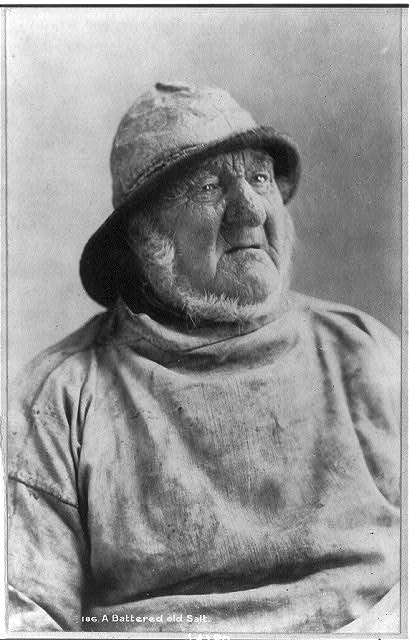
A Battered "Old Salt." 1900 photo.

An "old salt" is an old sailor or mariner who tells oral history and sea stories. Sometimes deemed a sage within their domain, and while sometimes a raconteur, much of the history and traditions of mariners are passed from generation to generation as told and retold by old salts. Their factual oral histories and fictional sea stories often intermingle and thus may overall be truthful, half-true, or fiction. Each narrative told by an old salt tends to have the aim of enhancing the reputation of the old salt, the old salt's companions, or the old salt's forebears, although they may also tell instructive tales of tragedy.

== United States military title ==
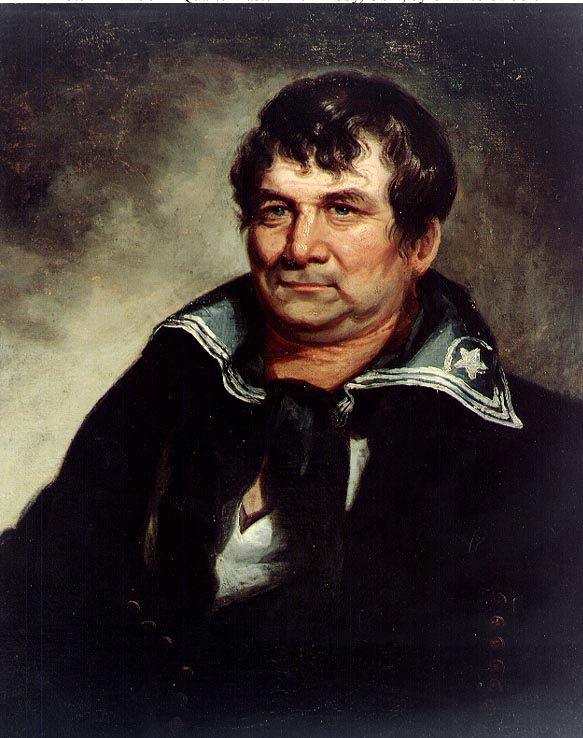
Quartermaster Dick Libby, USN, an Old Salt Portrait painted circa 1834 by Charles O. Cole

In the United States Navy, the "Old Salt" is a title passed to the longest serving Surface Warfare Officer on active duty. The award was most recently held by Admiral James W. Kilby, honors the officer with the earliest standing SWO qualification.

=== List of titleholders ===
No.	Portrait	Name	Tenure as titleholder			Positions held	Ref
No.	Portrait	Name	Date received	Date relinquished	Time as titleholder	Positions held	Ref
1		Admiral; Lee Baggett Jr.	November 4, 1988	December 9, 1988	35 days	Commander-in-Chief, United States Atlantic Command (1985-1988)	
2		Rear Admiral; Lawrence Layman	December 9, 1988	February 28, 1989	81 days	Director of Space, Command and Control (1986-1989)	
3		Vice Admiral; Albert J. Herberger	February 28, 1989	March 21, 1990	1 year, 21 days	Deputy Commander-in-Chief, United States Transportation Command (1987-1990)	
4		Vice Admiral; Joseph S. Donnell III	March 21, 1990	January 31, 1991	316 days	Commander, Naval Surface Force, U.S. Atlantic Fleet (????-1991)	
5		Admiral; David E. Jeremiah	February 1, 1991	February 28, 1994	3 years, 27 days	Vice Chairman of the Joint Chiefs of Staff (1990-1994)	
6		Vice Admiral; David M. Bennett	March 1, 1994	August 25, 1995	1 year, 177 days	Commander, Naval Surface Force, U.S. Pacific Fleet (1990-1992); Naval Inspector General (1992-1995)	
7		Vice Admiral; Philip M. Quast	August 26, 1995	February 14, 1997	1 year, 172 days	Commander, Military Sealift Command (1995-1997)	
8		Rear Admiral; George F.A. Wagner	February 15, 1997	April 30, 1998	1 year, 74 days	Commander, Space and Naval Warfare Systems Command (1995-1998)	
9		Rear Admiral; George A. Huchting	May 1, 1998	January 14, 1999	258 days	Program Executive Officer for Surface Combatants (1991-1998)	
10		Rear Admiral; Dennis R. Conley	January 14, 1999	March 31, 1999	76 days	Commander, Mine Warfare Command (1996-1999)	
11		Rear Admiral; James B. Ferguson III	April 1, 1999	June 1, 1999	61 days	Commander, Western Hemisphere Group (????-1999)	
12		Vice Admiral; James F. Amerault	June 2, 1999	July 24, 2001	2 years, 52 days	Deputy Chief of Naval Operations (Fleet Readiness and Logistics) (1998-2001)	
13		Vice Admiral; Rodney P. Rempt	July 25, 2001	May 21, 2007	5 years, 300 days	President of the Naval War College (2001-2003); Superintendent of the United States Naval Academy (2003-2007)	
14		Admiral; Michael Mullen	May 22, 2007	December 16, 2011	4 years, 208 days	Chief of Naval Operations (2005-2007); Chairman of the Joint Chiefs of Staff (2007-2011)	
15		Admiral; John C. Harvey Jr.	December 16, 2011	September 14, 2012	273 days	Commander, United States Fleet Forces Command (2009-2012)	
16		Vice Admiral; John Terence Blake	September 14, 2012	December 17, 2012	94 days	Deputy Chief of Naval Operations for Integration of Capabilities and Resources (2012)	
17		Vice Admiral; Michael A. Lefever	December 17, 2012	May 7, 2014	1 year, 141 days	Director, Strategic Operational Planning, National Counterterrorism Center (2011-2014)	
18		Admiral; Samuel J. Locklear	May 7, 2014	June 22, 2015	1 year, 46 days	Commander, United States Pacific Command (2012-2015)	
19		Admiral; Kurt W. Tidd	June 22, 2015	October 22, 2018	3 years, 122 days	Assistant to the Chairman of the Joint Chiefs of Staff (2013-2016); Commander, United States Southern Command (2016-2018)	
20		Admiral; Philip S. Davidson	October 22, 2018	April 30, 2021	2 years, 190 days	Commander, United States Indo-Pacific Command (2018-2021)	
21		Admiral; Christopher W. Grady	April 30, 2021	September 30, 2025	5 years, 77 days	Commander, United States Fleet Forces Command (2018-2021); Vice Chairman of the Joint Chiefs of Staff (2021–2025)	
