= Unmanned Carrier-Launched Airborne Surveillance and Strike =

2013–2016 United States Navy development program

The X-47B Unmanned Combat Air System demonstrator launches from the aircraft carrier USS George H.W. Bush (CVN 77) May 14, 2013.

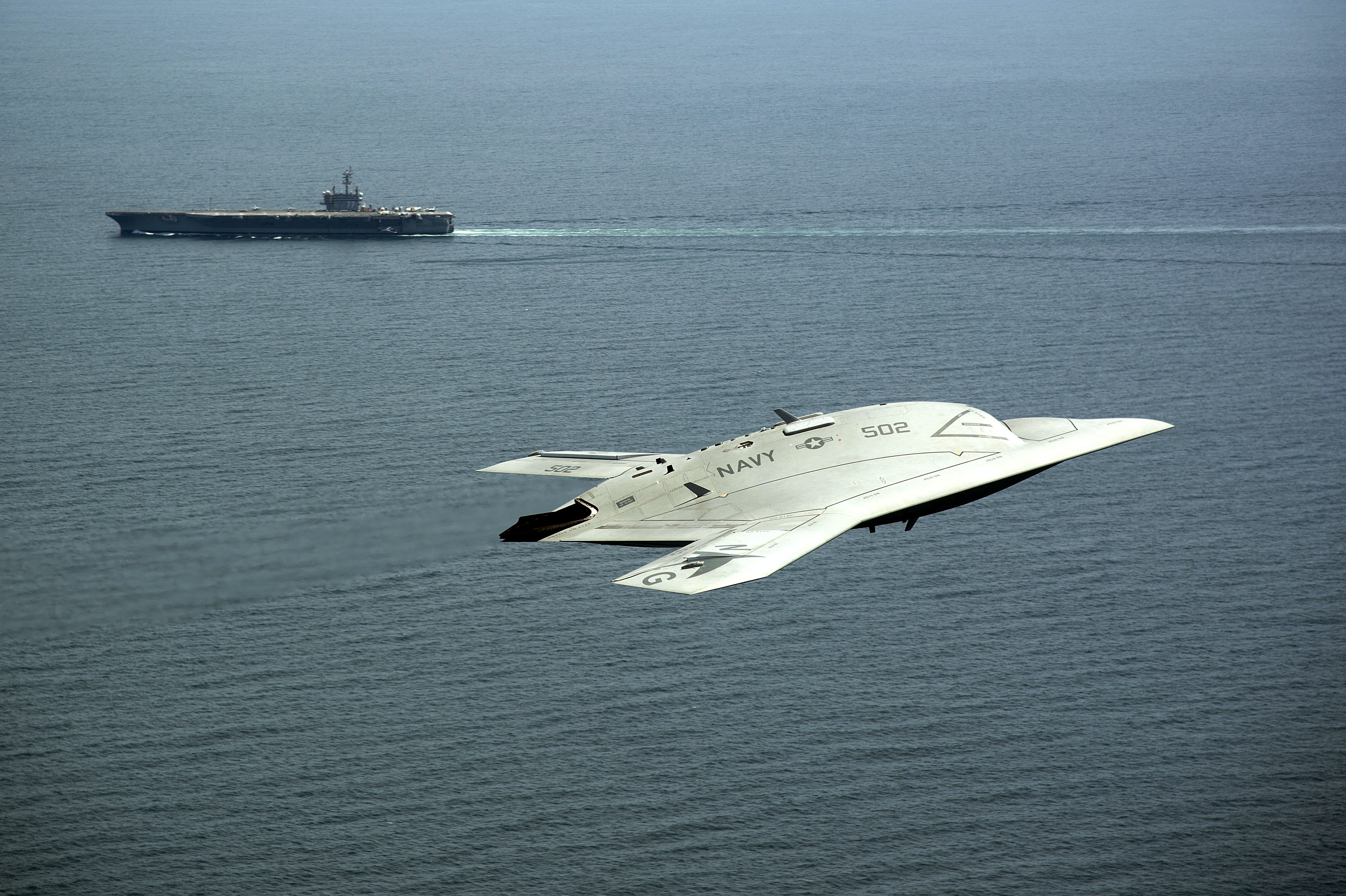
Unmanned X-47B with USS George H.W. Bush (CVN 77) in the background

The Unmanned Carrier-Launched Airborne Surveillance and Strike (UCLASS) was a United States Navy program to develop an autonomous carrier-based unmanned combat aerial vehicle providing an uncrewed intelligence and strike asset to the fleet. After debate over whether the UCLASS should primarily focus on stealthy bombing or scouting, the Pentagon instead changed the program entirely into the Carrier-Based Aerial-Refueling System (CBARS) to create a UAV for aerial refueling duties to extend the range of manned fighters, which led to the Boeing MQ-25 Stingray.

== Competitors ==
The UCLASS program had several competing designs and design bases:

- Northrop Grumman design based on their Northrop Grumman X-47B demonstrator
- Lockheed Martin Sea Ghost (based on RQ-170 Sentinel)
- Boeing design based on the Boeing Phantom Ray
- General Atomics offered the Sea Avenger, a naval version of their original land-based MQ-20 Avenger

== Development ==
On 19 March 2010 the Navy issued Request for Information (RFI) N00019-UCLASS-RFI-A for planning purposes, as part of a market survey led by the Navy Program Executive Office for Unmanned Aviation and Strike Weapons [PEO (U&W)].

On June 9, 2011, the Joint Requirements Oversight Council (JROC) issued JROCM 087–11, a memorandum approving the UCLASS Initial Capabilities Document (ICD). That document stated UCLASS was to be “a persistent, survivable carrier-based Intelligence, Surveillance, and Reconnaissance and precision strike asset.”

In preparing for the FY2014 budget submission, the JROC revisited the UCLASS requirement. On December 19, 2012, the JROC published memoranda 086-12 and 196–12, which significantly altered “the requirements for UCLASS, heavily favoring permissive airspace intelligence, surveillance and reconnaissance (ISR) capabilities.” The change in requirements appeared to be budget-driven. “The reduction in strike capability of the Navy’s next generation carrier-based uncrewed aerial vehicle was born of fiscal realities, said Dyke Weatherington, the Pentagon’s Director, Unmanned Warfare & Intelligence, Surveillance, and Reconnaissance (ISR).”

The Navy announced 14 August 2013 that four Preliminary Design Review (PDR) contracts were awarded for the UCLASS air vehicle segment. The four $15 million firm-fixed price contracts were awarded to Boeing Co., General Atomics Aeronautical Systems, Inc., Lockheed Martin Corp. and Northrop Grumman Systems Corp. The period of performance for the contracting efforts was approximately nine months. UCLASS program manager, Charlie Nava, said: "The PDRs are intended to inform the navy of the technical risk, cost and design maturity of the air segment (AS), and allows the industry teams to better understand the program’s requirements across the entire UCLASS system, to expeditiously deliver the unmanned carrier-based system to the fleet."

In early 2014, the USN released draft requests for proposal (RFPs) to the four competitors. The RFPs were individualized for each company, so the exact specifications were publicly unknown. The RFPs were originally supposed to be issued in late 2012, but were delayed several times. The RFP was to mature the four designs up to a preliminary design review (PDR) over nine months and assess technical readiness. The draft RFP for technology development was delayed from August to September 2013. There was continuing debate over requirements and stealth, with General Atomics and Boeing expected to de-emphasize stealth in favor of endurance and payload, and Northrop Grumman and Lockheed Martin pitching tailless high-survivability designs. On 14 August 2013, the Navy awarded four development contracts to Boeing, General Atomics, Lockheed, and Northrop Grumman. Each contract was worth $15 million to develop airframe designs.

The Navy planned to arm the proposed UCLASS with weapons currently in the carrier air wing's inventory. With the priority of the aircraft on ISR, the airframe would accommodate a fifth-generation AESA radar and multiple intelligence (multi-int) sensors to include electro-optical/infrared sensors and full-motion video cameras to detect and track land and sea targets while armed with Joint Direct Attack Munitions. The Navy hinted at the possibility of using the UCLASS in air-to-air engagements as a "flying missile magazine" to supplement the F/A-18 Super Hornet and F-35C Lightning II as a type of "robotic wingman." Its weapons bay could be filled with AIM-120 AMRAAMs and be remotely operated by an E-2D Hawkeye or F-35C flight leader, using their own sensors and human judgment to detect, track, and direct the UAV to engage an enemy aircraft. The Navy's Naval Integrated Fire Control-Counter Air (NIFC-CA) concept gives a common picture of the battle space to multiple air platforms through data-links, where any aircraft could fire on a target in their range that is being tracked by any sensor, so the forward deployed UCLASS would have its missiles targeted by another controller. With crewed-uncrewed teaming for air combat, a dedicated uncrewed supersonic fighter may not be developed, as the greater cost of high-thrust propulsion and an airframe of similar size to a manned fighter would deliver a platform with comparable operating costs and still without an ability to engage on its own.

NAVAIR planned to release the draft RFP by the end of March 2014. The Navy was optimizing the UCLASS for ISR and limited strike rather than long-range strike, along with a potential tanker role. On 18 February 2014, Congressman Randy Forbes wrote a letter to Secretary of the Navy Ray Mabus advocating for the UCLASS to have aerial refueling, survivability, and payloads to make it effective in future contested air environments. Forbes requested the aircraft have broad-band stealth to survive integrated air defense systems and have the payload capacity to simultaneously support land and sea missions. Aerial refueling was also cited as a needed capability for responding to far-off threats and conducting missions outside the envelope of long-range threats, particularly the Chinese DF-21D anti-ship ballistic missile.

=== Requirements controversy ===
Navy officials expressed concern that the original requirements of the UCLASS program had been degraded, as the original concept called for a stealthy, carrier-based, long-range uncrewed combat aerial system (UCAS) with a large payload that could be refueled in-flight, but the altered version called for a UCAS that was modestly stealthy and emphasised intelligence, surveillance and reconnaissance (ISR) missions over lightly contested airspace, with a light secondary strike mission and no air refueling requirement, promoting affordability over survivability and endurance; the revised requirements were written to fill a gap in persistent, sea-based ISR. Stealth requirements were sharply reduced to lower costs, and original payload requirements calling for weapons bays to carry as many as 24 GBU-39 SDB 250 lb bombs, totaling a 6,000 lb of weapons, were reduced for a total payload of 1,360 kg (3,000 lb) and only 454 kg (1,001 lb) of weapons. The Joint Requirements Oversight Council (JROC) modified requirements during an 18 December 2012 meeting and did not consider them to be "relaxed," but rather changed to consider "within the broader unmanned aircraft portfolio and included an assessment of the platform's performance, capability, survivability, and basing," shifting to increase some performance areas and decrease others to get a mix. JROC was reported to have changed the requirements in order to produce a replacement for the current drones used for Disposition Matrix missions that would not require host nation basing or permission, changing focus from a UAV capable of striking defended targets to keep costs down and maintain uncrewed counterterrorism missions as a U.S. military option. Flying missions from sea-based carriers would have fewer restrictions than operating inside foreign countries, and irregular warfare missions will continue in the future to warrant further attention.

Congress and industry both agreed that the Navy had deviated significantly from the normal process for developing a new aircraft. For nearly three years, companies developed their candidates with company funds based on assumptions about the Navy's requirements without any guidance from the service. The Navy did not issue any aircraft performance specifications or draft requirements until the spring of 2013, so competitors tried to refit their aircraft for the preliminary design review phase. The lack of feedback was compounded by the shift of mission statements, from a long-range penetrating strike platform to long-duration orbits over permissive airspace. Endurance requirements of over 12 hours were especially hard to meet, as there are limitations of an aircraft's wingspan for holding fuel on the confined space of an aircraft carrier; the UCLASS had to maintain two 600 nmi (1,100 km; 690 mi) orbits around the ship, or one orbit at a range of 1,200 nmi (2,200 km; 1,400 mi), with the ability to attack lightly defended targets out to 2,000 nmi (3,700 km; 2,300 mi). After pressure from Congress, industry, and the Government Accountability Office, the Navy took another look at the draft requirements for the UCLASS. They were scheduled to be released in October 2013 but were delayed. The main reason behind the internal strife was indecision over the future of the aircraft carrier fleet and their air wings, between better UAV-based ISR coverage integrated on board carriers in the near-future and integrating a new uncrewed aircraft into the carrier air wing to make the carrier a more effective strike platform.

By December 2013, the UCLASS concept aircraft had shifted around significantly. Original requirements that were for a relatively simple ISR platform, were changed to a "heavy-end" ISR and strike aircraft with growth for weapons and sensors. It was planned to weigh 70,000 to 80,000 lb (32,000 to 36,000 kg), about the size of the F-14 Tomcat and much larger than the X-47B, and be around 68 ft (21 m) in length, longer than the F/A-18 Super Hornet, with endurance potentially up to 14 hours. Other roles were being considered such as an aerial refueling platform to extend the range of fighters, transferring 20,000 lb (9,100 kg) of fuel and still staying airborne for up to 7.5 hours. The four industry teams pushed back against the idea of a more capable UCLASS because the specifications would be significantly different from aircraft they developed for the PDR phase, and cost per aircraft would also increase from $35-$50 million to $100 million. Top-level UCLASS requirements of providing 24-hour persistent ISR coverage from the carrier at “tactically significant” ranges with limited strike capabilities at mid-to-long ranges remained fixed since spring 2013, though detailed specifications had been refined. Cost constraints drove Navy requirements for the UCLASS. One requirement that had remained constant was for the aircraft to conduct ISR orbits at tactically significant ranges for $150 million, meaning two air vehicles costing $75 million each can cover one orbit if they have an endurance of 14 hours.

=== Program continuation ===
The U.S. Navy released the long-delayed RFP for the UCLASS on 17 April 2014, after Navy Secretary Ray Mabus signed the draft the previous day. The draft RFP was planned to be released in mid-2013, but was repeatedly delayed by disagreements over the proposed aircraft's stealth levels, ability to survive in contested airspace, and in-flight refueling ability. Though classified, available details showed original UCLASS specifications of continuously providing two ISR orbits at range over uncontested airspace with a light strike capability to eliminate targets of opportunity. The airframe would also have an open architecture design to be easily upgradable. The Navy was pursuing a path to at first use the UCLASS as a reconnaissance asset with proven standoff sensor technologies to observe targets in uncontested international airspace, while building in excess weight, space, and power capacity to add sensors and weapons and modify it later for use in contested airspace if needed. In July 2014, JROC launched a review of the UCLASS program in response to congressional criticism that Navy requirements were too narrowly focused to meet future mission threats. Although the Navy planned to weaponize the UCLASS incrementally, stealth and payload are things that must be built into an airframe and cannot be engineered in at a later time. With the requirements again being reviewed, the planned release of the RFP in late July was suspended until the creation of a new joint Capabilities Development Document (CDD).

By mid-2014, the Navy had shifted the concept of the UCLASS for a third time. In 2006, it was envisioned to extend the inland reach of carriers beyond manned aircraft. In 2011, that was altered to a cheaper design that would act as a carrier ISR asset without the rest of the air wing that could also be used to hunt down terrorists. The third concept was an uncrewed vehicle that would operate almost exclusively over the ocean, with initial missions including permissive airspace ISR and strike, then expanding to contested littoral and coastal ISR and strike and attacking enemy surface ships. It has been speculated that one of the reasons for making the UCLASS more ISR-centric was to prevent it from taking the role of the F/A-XX, the manned future fighter replacement for the F/A-18E/F Super Hornet. The F/A-XX is envisioned as a manned multi-role fighter, and the Navy cannot simultaneously develop the F-35C, UCLASS, and F/A-XX all as expensive strike assets. On 18 December 2014, the Navy released a directive saying the UCLASS would be embedded in the same air wing that operates E-2C/D Hawkeye command and control aircraft, meaning a detachment of the E-2 wing, the commander of the E-2 unit on board the carrier, would have control over the uncrewed platform during air operations and it would not act as a standalone unit or be operated under an F-35C wing. In the Navy's FY 2016 budget request, the planned fielding date of the UCLASS was pushed from 2020 to 2022–2023, and the RFP was again delayed as a result of the ongoing review of what roles the aircraft will perform.

=== CBARS ===
On 1 February 2016, after many delays over whether the UCLASS would specialize in strike or ISR roles, it was reported that a significant portion of the UCLASS effort would be directed to produce a Super Hornet–sized carrier-based aerial tanker as the Carrier-Based Aerial-Refueling System (CBARS), with "a little ISR" and some capabilities to relay communications, with strike capabilities deferred to a future version of the aircraft. The Pentagon chose this in order to address the Navy's expected fighter shortfall by directing funds to buy additional Super Hornets and accelerate purchases and development of the F-35C, quickly getting naval stealth fighters into service, and extending their range to penetrate hostile airspace. It will likely be a less-stealthy wing–body–tail configuration that will limit its ability to operate in contested airspace, be more sensitive to cost considerations, and favor Boeing and General Atomics submissions. Having the CBARS as the first carrier-based UAV provides a less complex bridge to the future F/A-XX, should it be an autonomous strike platform. It also addresses the carriers' need for an organic refueling aircraft, proposed as a mission for the UCLASS since 2014, freeing up the 20–30 percent of Super Hornets performing the mission in a more capable and cost effective manner than modifying the F-35, V-22 Osprey, and E-2D Hawkeye, or bringing the retired S-3 Viking back into service. Although initially designated the RAQ-25, the name was changed to the MQ-25 Stingray. Stealth requirements will be "descoped" and it may still be capable of firing missiles or dropping bombs from drop tank pylons, but surveillance and destroying targets will not be its main missions. Reducing the low-observable requirement is expected to make things easier for existing UCLASS competitors, and to open the competition to new entrants. An RFP for the air vehicle was issued in late 2016; Boeing was awarded the CBARS contract in August 2018.

== See also ==
- UCAS-D
- Drone carrier
