= Davidson window =

American strategic concept about Taiwan

The Davidson window is a strategic concept referring to the timeframe between 2021 and 2027 during which some military analysts believe China will develop sufficient capabilities to attempt control of Taiwan. Named after Admiral Philip S. Davidson, the concept has become central to Indo-Pacific defense planning and U.S.-China strategic competition.

The concept gained widespread attention following CIA director William J. Burns' 2023 statement that, according to U.S. intelligence, General Secretary of the Chinese Communist Party Xi Jinping had instructed the People's Liberation Army to be ready for a Taiwan invasion by 2027.

== Origin ==
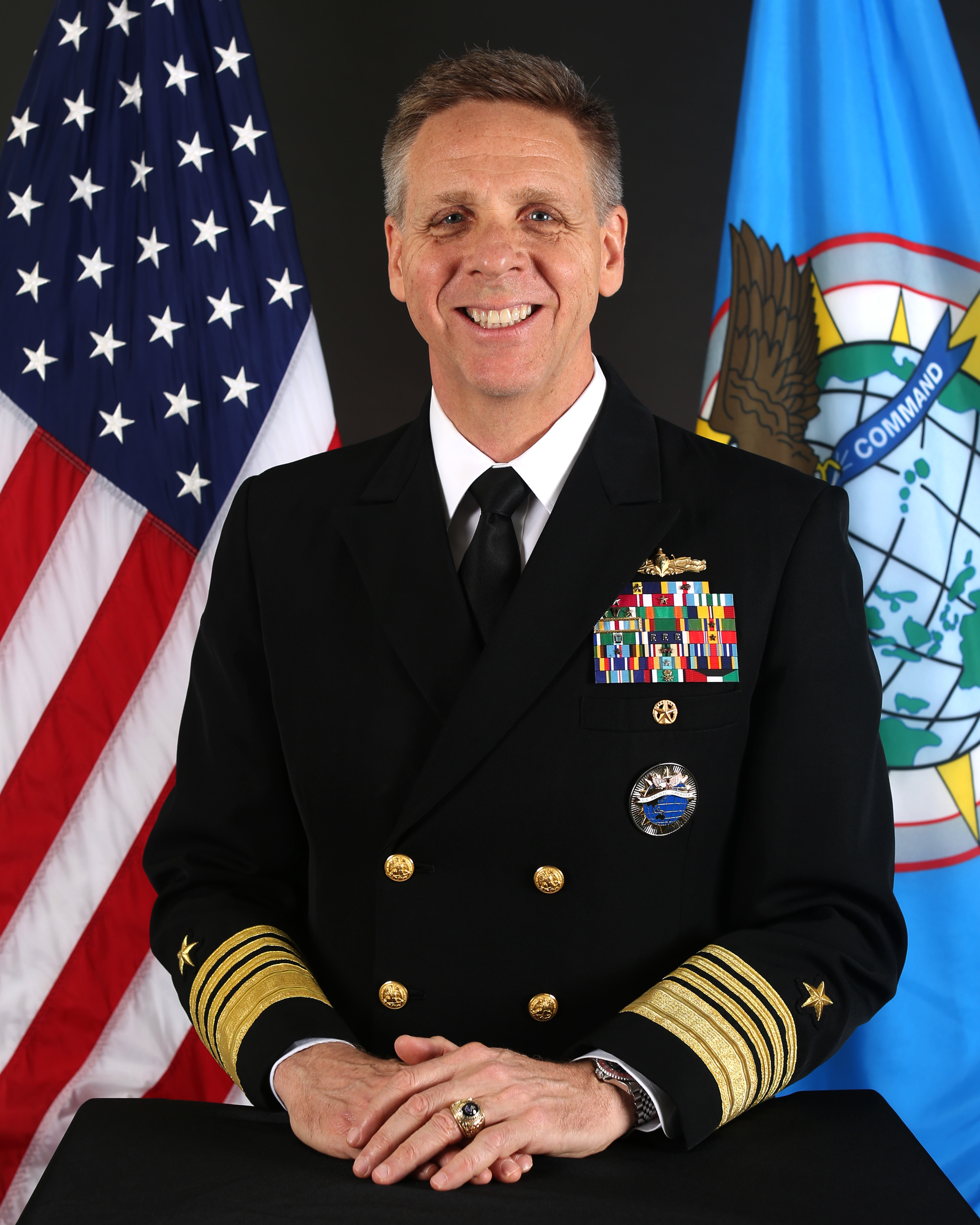
Admiral Philip S. Davidson, who articulated the 2027 timeline

Admiral Davidson warned the United States Senate Committee on Armed Services on March 9, 2021, that "Taiwan is clearly one of their ambitions before then. And I think the threat is manifest during this decade, in fact, in the next six years." He cited China's accelerating timeline to "supplant the United States" and comprehensive military buildup including "ships, aircraft, rockets" combined with aggressive actions across "Hong Kong, Xinjiang, and Tibet". The assessment prompted broader analysis of whether China was stepping up its ambition to supplant the U.S. as the dominant global superpower.

== Strategic impact ==
The timeline drove Congress to authorize $7.1 billion for the Pacific Deterrence Initiative in 2022, $2.1 billion above Pentagon requests. Defense analysts warned of "closing the Davidson Window" as the U.S. Navy would contract from 292 ships in 2022 to 280 by 2027 while China's fleet expands. China has nearly tripled its precision-attack missiles to 3,500 systems since 2020.

Regional allies responded decisively: Japan committed to doubling defense spending to 2% of GDP, Australia strengthened AUKUS with nuclear submarines, and the Philippines expanded U.S. base access under President Bongbong Marcos.

== Expert assessment ==
The Center for Strategic and International Studies found 83% of China experts reject that China plans kinetic action against Taiwan by 2027. Representative Jim Himes called 2027 invasion scenarios "really dumb" given economic costs. However, naval analysts have developed detailed "War of 2026" scenarios examining how U.S. forces would fight during the Davidson Window, while some experts argue China will "squeeze, not seize" Taiwan through non-military coercion. RAND Corporation warns the U.S. would struggle to win a Taiwan conflict under current force balances.

== Current status ==
As of 2025, military analysts note China continues capability development while the U.S. enhances deterrence. Admiral John Aquilino affirmed the timeline's validity while maintaining conflict is "neither imminent nor inevitable." Davidson himself emphasized in 2022 that the U.S. must maintain capabilities to prevent China from "dictating the terms" in the Pacific, arguing China has a "100-year trajectory" to "displace the international order."

== See also ==
- Cross-Strait relations
- First island chain
- Anti-Access/Area Denial
- Chinese military exercises around Taiwan, which became increasingly assertive since 2022
