= Christopher W. Grady =

Retired American admiral (born 1962)

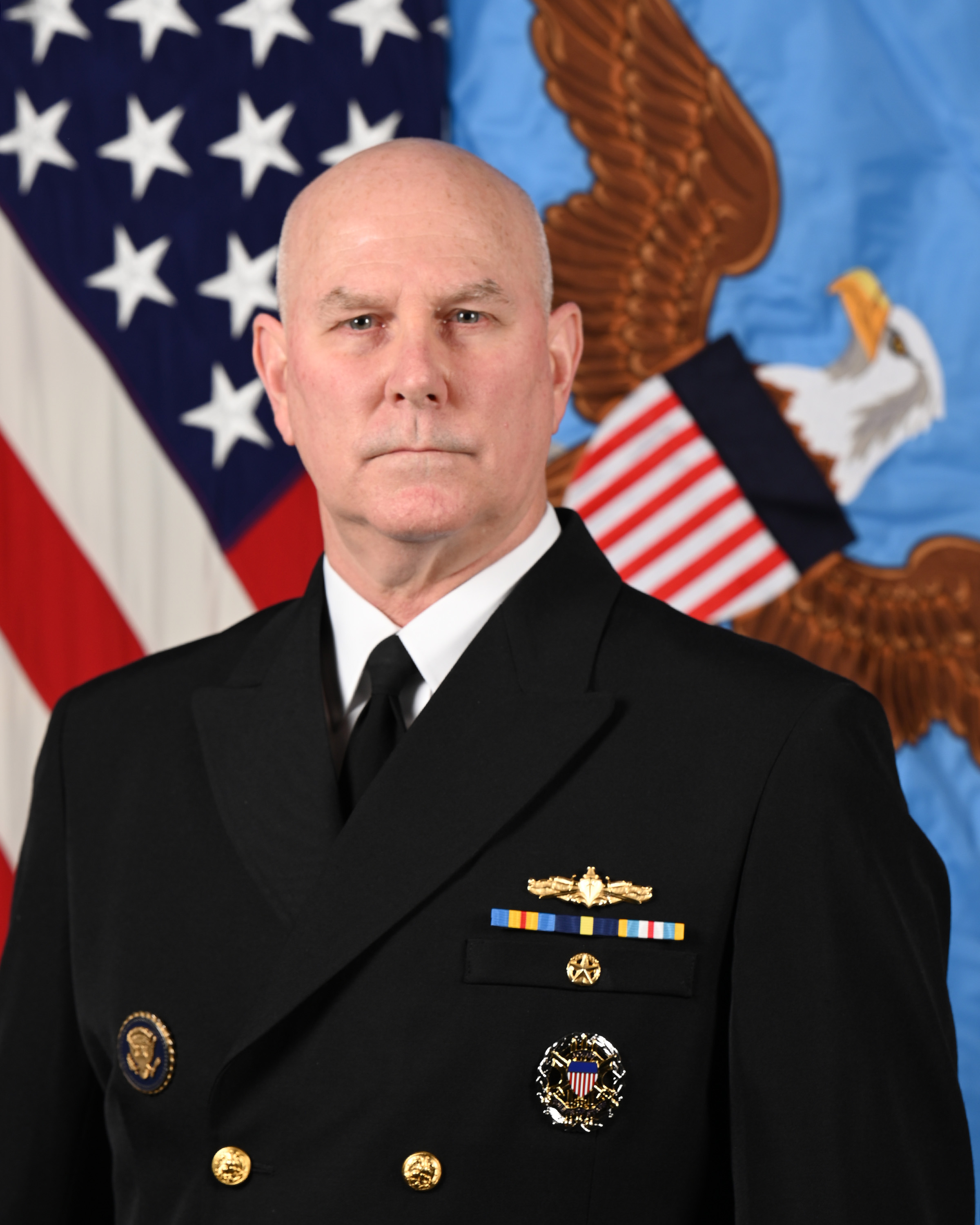
- Official portrait, 2021
- Born: 28 November 1962 (age 63); Portsmouth, Virginia, U.S.
- Allegiance: United States
- Branch: United States Navy
- Service years: 1984–2025
- Rank: Admiral
- Commands: Chairman of the Joint Chiefs of Staff (acting); Vice Chairman of the Joint Chiefs of Staff; United States Fleet Forces Command; United States Naval Forces Northern Command; United States Naval Forces Strategic Command; Naval Striking and Support Forces NATO; United States Sixth Fleet; Carrier Strike Group 1 Destroyer Squadron 22; USS Cole (DDG 67); USS Ardent (MCM 12); USS Chief (MCM 14)
- Conflicts: Gulf War; War in Afghanistan; Iraq War
- Awards: Defense Distinguished Service Medal; Navy Distinguished Service Medal; Defense Superior Service Medal; Legion of Merit (5)
- Education: University of Notre Dame (BA); Georgetown University (MA); National Defense University (MS)
- Christopher W. Grady's voice Grady's opening statement at his confirmation hearing to be vice chairman of the Joint Chiefs of Staff; Recorded December 8, 2021

Christopher Watson Grady (born 28 November 1962) is a retired American admiral who served as the 12th vice chairman of the Joint Chiefs of Staff from 2021 to 2025. Grady also served as the acting chairman of the Joint Chiefs of Staff in 2025.

Grady previously served as the commander of United States Fleet Forces Command and United States Naval Forces Northern Command from May 2018 to December 2021, with additional duties as commander of United States Naval Forces Strategic Command and Joint Force Maritime Component Commander from February 2019. Before that he was the commander of the United States Sixth Fleet, commander of Naval Striking and Support Forces NATO, deputy commander of United States Naval Forces Europe - Naval Forces Africa and Joint Force Maritime Component Commander Europe from October 2016 to March 2018.

A 1984 graduate of the University of Notre Dame, Grady was commissioned in the United States Navy via the Naval Reserve Officers' Training Corps program. He became the Navy's "Old Salt", its longest-serving surface warfare officer on active duty, having received the title and accompanying trophy from Admiral Philip S. Davidson on 20 April 2021 and would hold this distinction until his retirement from the Navy on 30 September 2025.

== Naval career ==
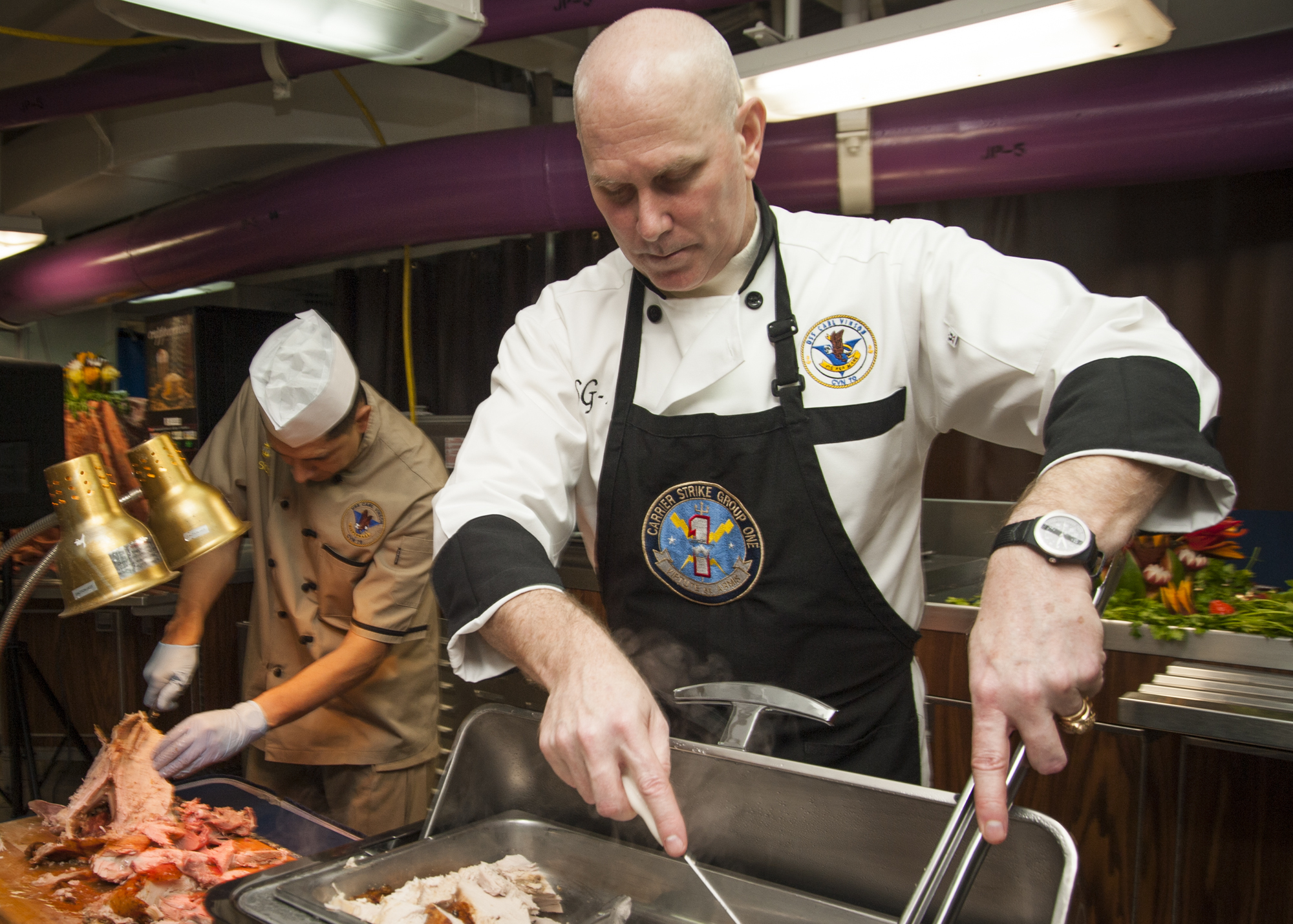
Rear Adm. Grady, as commander, Carrier Strike Group 1, prepares food on Thanksgiving dinner for sailors aboard the USS Carl Vinson, 27 November 2014

Christopher Grady was born in Portsmouth, Virginia and raised in Newport, Rhode Island. He is a graduate of the University of Notre Dame, and was commissioned an ensign in the United States Navy through the Naval Reserve Officers Training Corps program in 1984. Grady is a graduate of Georgetown University, where he earned a Master of Arts in National Security Studies while concurrently participating as a fellow in Foreign Service at the Edmund A. Walsh School of Foreign Service. He is also a graduate of the National War College of National Defense University, earning a Master of Science in National Security Affairs.

Grady's initial sea tour was aboard USS Moosbrugger (DD 980), where he served as combat information center officer and anti-submarine warfare officer. As a department head, he served as weapons control officer and combat systems officer in USS Princeton (CG 59). He was the commanding officer of Mine Counter Measure Rotational Crew Echo in USS Chief (MCM 14), and deployed to the Persian Gulf in command of USS Ardent (MCM 12). Grady then commanded USS Cole (DDG 67) deploying as part of NATO's Standing Naval Forces Mediterranean. He then commanded Destroyer Squadron 22, deploying to the Persian Gulf as sea combat commander for the Theodore Roosevelt Carrier Strike Group (TRCSG) in support of Operations Enduring Freedom and Iraqi Freedom.

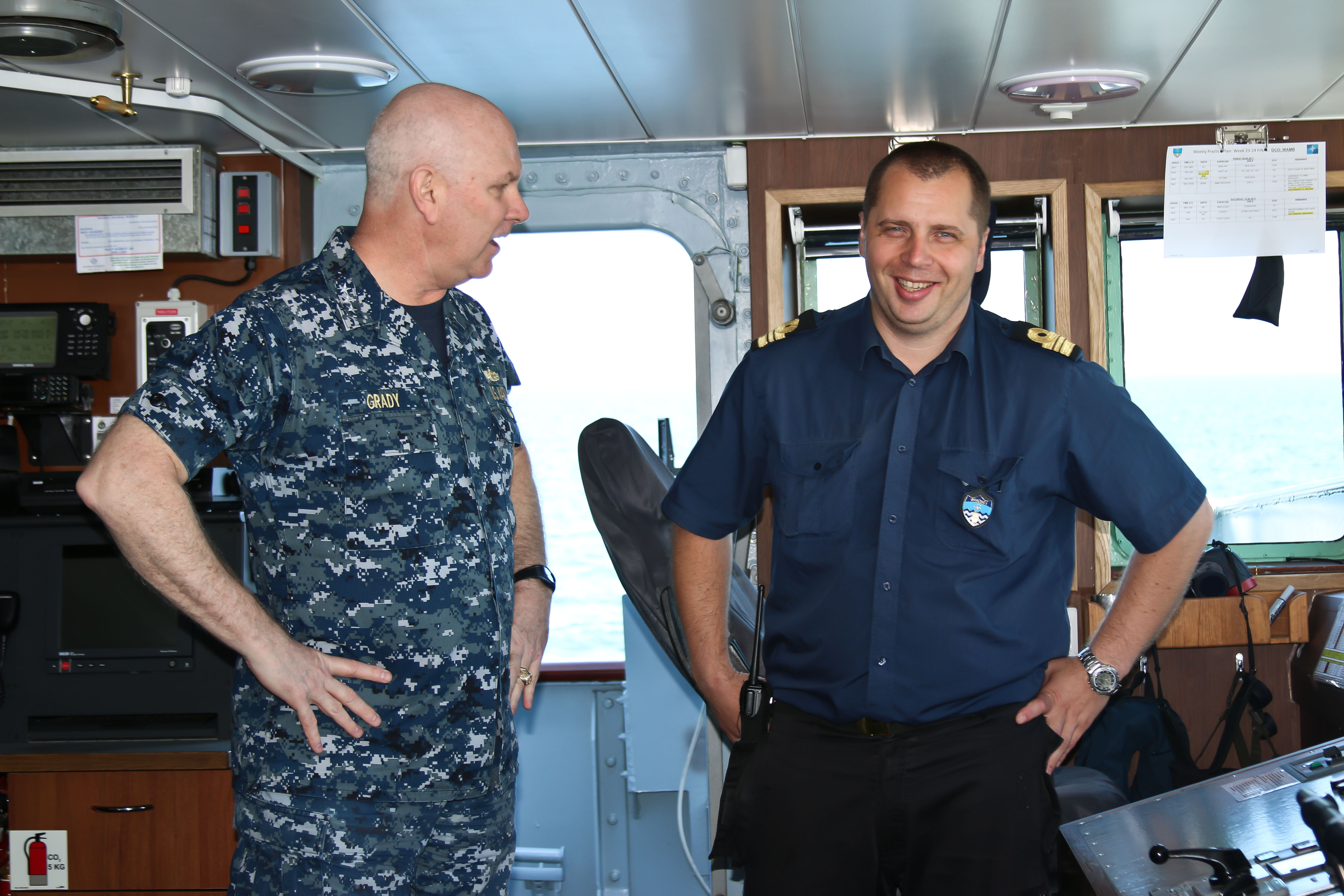
Vice Adm. Grady visits the Lindormen-class support vessel EML Wambola (A433) during exercise BALTOPS 2017, 10 June 2017

Ashore, Grady first served on the staff of the Joint Chiefs of Staff and then as naval aide to the chief of naval operations. He also served on the staff of the chief of naval operations as assistant branch head, Europe and Eurasia Politico-Military Affairs Branch (OPNAV N524). He then served as executive assistant to the navy's Chief of Legislative Affairs. Next, he served as the deputy executive secretary of the National Security Council in the White House. He then went on to serve as the executive assistant to the chief of naval operations.

Grady's flag assignments include the Director of the Maritime Operations Center (N2/3/5/7), commander, United States Pacific Fleet; Commander, Carrier Strike Group 1 and the Carl Vinson Carrier Strike Group, where he deployed for nearly ten months to the Western Pacific and the Persian Gulf conducting combat operations in support of Operation Inherent Resolve. He was then commander of Naval Surface Force Atlantic.

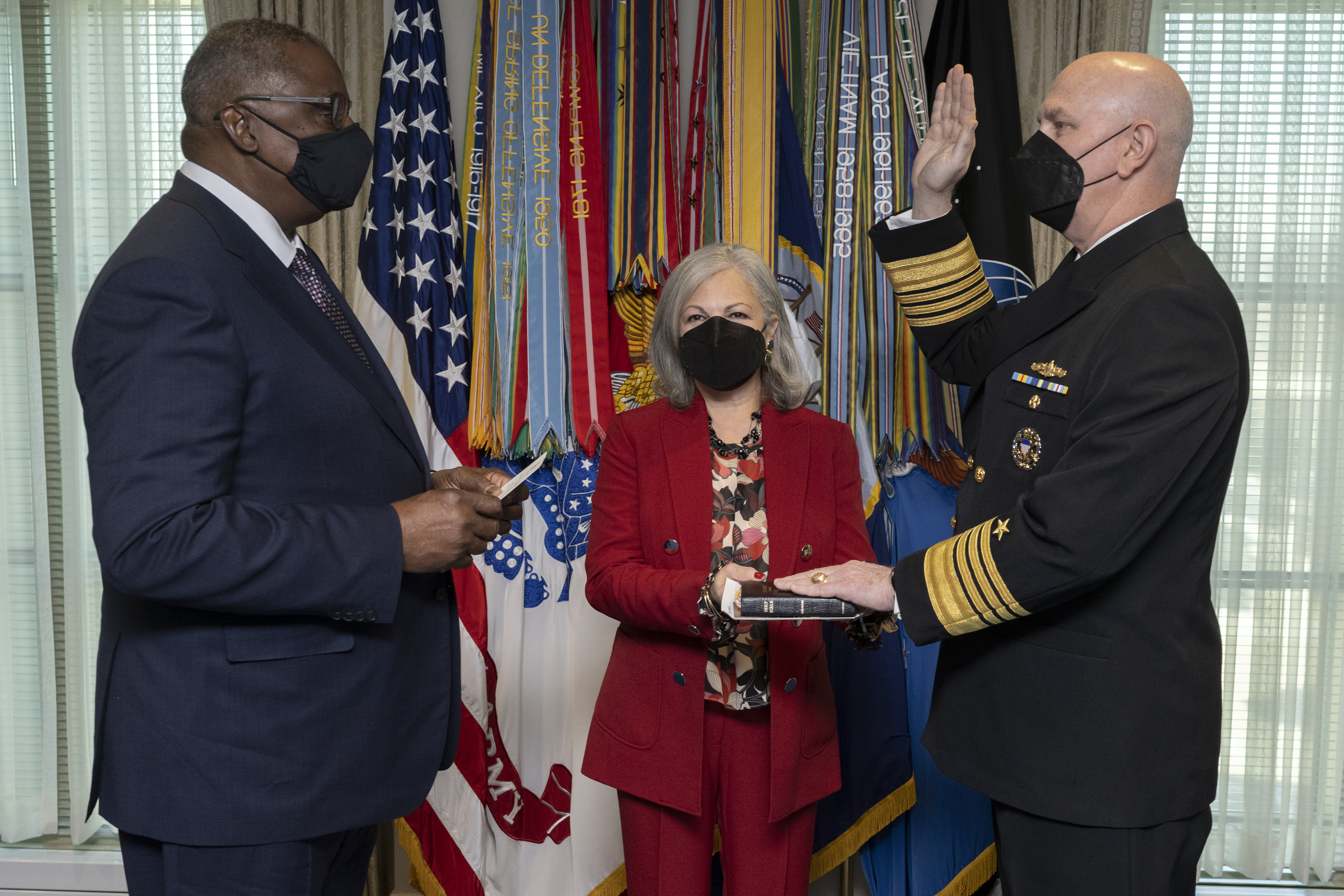
Grady is sworn in as the 12th vice chairman of the Joint Chiefs of Staff by Secretary of Defense Lloyd Austin on 20 December 2021

As a vice admiral, he commanded the United States Sixth Fleet from 28 October 2016 to 1 March 2018, relinquishing command to Vice Admiral Lisa Franchetti. On 31 October 2017, the United States Senate confirmed Grady's reappointment to the rank of vice admiral and assignment as the assistant to the Chairman of the Joint Chiefs of Staff.

On 28 February 2018, Grady was nominated by President Donald Trump for appointment to the rank of admiral and assignment as commander of United States Fleet Forces Command, and confirmed by the Senate on 22 March 2018. He assumed command of USFFC and Naval Forces Northern Command on 4 May 2018 and of commander, Naval Forces Strategic Command (NAVSTRAT) and United States Strategic Command Joint Force Maritime Component Command (JFMCC) on 1 February 2019.

=== Vice Chairman of the Joint Chiefs of Staff ===
On 1 November 2021, he was nominated by President Joe Biden to succeed retiring General John E. Hyten as the vice chairman of the Joint Chiefs of Staff. A nomination hearing was scheduled for 2 December 2021, but it was postponed in favor of Senate negotiations on the 2022 NDAA. He was confirmed by voice vote on 16 December 2021, and was sworn in on 20 December 2021.

=== Acting Chairman of the Joint Chiefs of Staff ===
On 21 February 2025, President Donald Trump dismissed Air Force General C. Q. Brown, Jr. from his position as Chairman of the Joint Chiefs of Staff. In accordance with 10 USC Ch 5, Admiral Grady assumed the role of acting Chairman of the Joint Chiefs of Staff. This ended with the confirmation of Air Force General Dan Caine on 11 April 2025.

== Personal life ==
Grady and his wife Christine, married around 1985, have three children and a daughter-in-law.

On 18 May 2025, Grady delivered the commencement speech at the University of Notre Dame, in which he urged students to challenge themselves amidst the growing complexity of the global climate. He also received a Doctor of Laws honoris causa degree (LL.D.) from the institution, presented by university president Father Dowd.

== Awards and decorations ==
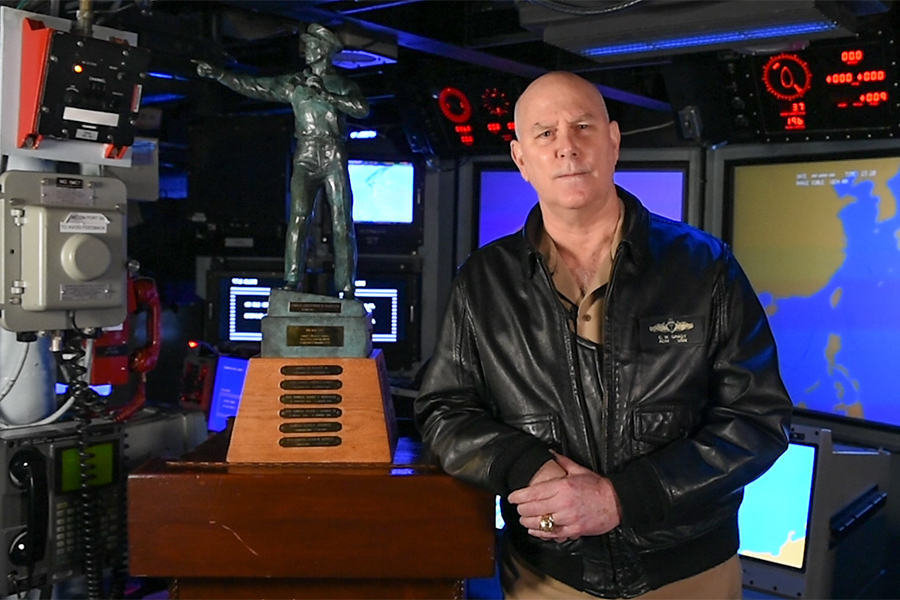
Grady accepts the 'Old Salt' Award on board USS Cole (DDG 67) on 30 April 2021

In addition to the below, the University of Notre Dame Alumni Board presented Grady with the Rev. William Corby, C.S.C., Award on 28 September 2019. Established in 1985, the award is conferred on alumni who have distinguished themselves in military service.

Other accoutrements
Surface Warfare Officer Insignia
Command at Sea insignia
Office of the Joint Chiefs of Staff Identification Badge
Presidential Service Badge

Personal decorations
Defense Distinguished Service Medal
Navy Distinguished Service Medal
Defense Superior Service Medal
Legion of Merit with four gold award stars
Meritorious Service Medal with four award stars
Joint Service Commendation Medal
Navy and Marine Corps Commendation Medal with Combat V and three award stars
Joint Service Achievement Medal
Unit Awards
Joint Meritorious Unit Award
Navy Meritorious Unit Commendation with one bronze service star
Navy "E" Ribbon with three Battle "E" devices
Campaign and service medals
Navy Expeditionary Medal
National Defense Service Medal with service star
Armed Forces Expeditionary Medal
Southwest Asia Service Medal with service star
Global War on Terrorism Expeditionary Medal
Global War on Terrorism Service Medal
Navy Sea Service Deployment Ribbon with silver service star
Foreign and international awards
Kuwait Liberation Medal (Kuwait)
Marksmanship awards
Navy Expert Rifleman Medal
Navy Expert Pistol Shot Medal

- Surface Navy Association's "Old Salt" Award

== Dates of promotion ==
Rank	Branch	Date
Ensign	Navy	1984
Lieutenant junior grade	Navy	
Lieutenant	Navy	
Lieutenant commander	Navy	
Commander	Navy	25 September 1998
Captain	Navy	29 July 2005
Rear admiral (lower half)	Navy	30 June 2011
Rear admiral	Navy	21 June 2015
Vice admiral	Navy	28 September 2016
Admiral	Navy	22 March 2018

Military offices
Preceded by Peter Gumataotao	Commander of Naval Surface Force Atlantic; 2015–2016	Succeeded by Patrick Piercey
Preceded by James G. Foggo III	Commander of the United States Sixth Fleet and Naval Striking and Support Forces NATO; 2016–2018	Succeeded by Lisa M. Franchetti
Preceded by Philip S. Davidson	Commander of the United States Fleet Forces Command; 2018–2021	Succeeded by Daryl L. Caudle
Preceded by John E. Hyten	Vice Chairman of the Joint Chiefs of Staff; 2021–2025	Succeeded by Christopher J. Mahoney
Preceded by Charles Q. Brown Jr.	Chairman of the Joint Chiefs of Staff; Acting; 2025	Succeeded by Dan Caine
