= Michael Manazir =

Retired American admiral (b. 1959)

Michael C. Manazir
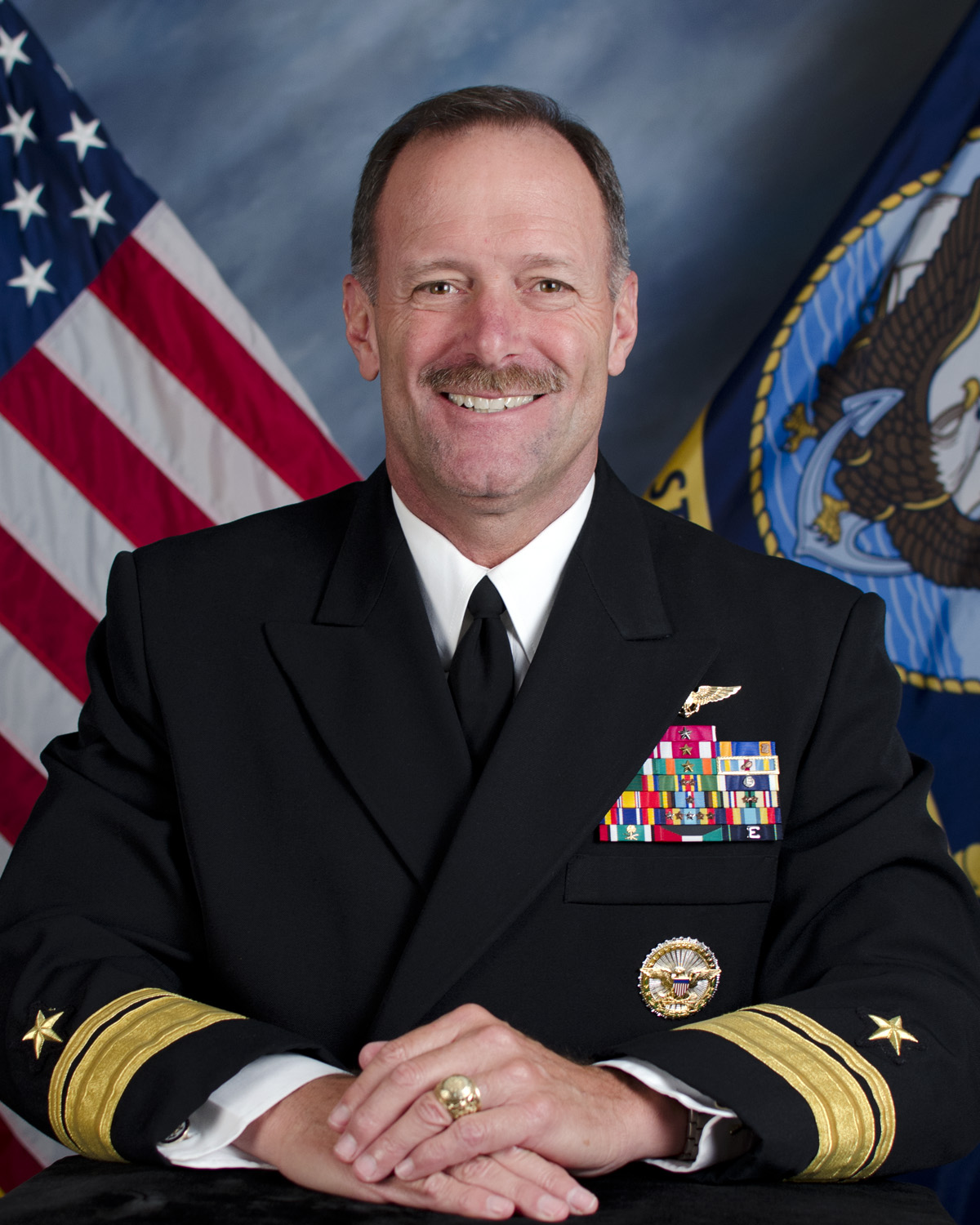
- Born: 1959 (age 66–67); Quantico, Virginia, U.S.
- Military career
- Allegiance: United States
- Branch: United States Navy
- Service years: 1981–2017
- Rank: Rear Admiral
- Commands: Carrier Strike Group 8 USS Nimitz; USS Sacramento (AOE-1); VF-31
- Conflicts: Gulf War; Iraq War; War in Afghanistan
- Other work: Vice President of Boeing

Michael "Mike" Charles Manazir (born 1959) is a retired American rear admiral who last served as the deputy chief of naval operations for warfare systems before his retirement in 2017. He graduated from the United States Naval Academy in 1981 and became a naval aviator. During his career in the United States Navy, he had deployments for the Gulf War, the Iraq War, and the War in Afghanistan. Manazir's notable commands included a fighter squadron, a fast combat support ship, an aircraft carrier, and Carrier Strike Group 8.

== Early life and education ==
Manazir was born in 1959 in Quantico, Virginia, and is the son of a career United States Marine. He graduated from Mission Viejo High School in 1977 and subsequently attended the U.S. Naval Academy, where he earned a Bachelor of Science in aerospace engineering in 1981. Manazir was trained as a naval aviator, qualifying in the F-14A/D Tomcat and the F/A-18E/F Super Hornet. He was designated a Naval Aviator in April 1983.

== Naval career ==
Manazir completed F-14A training and reported for duty to VF-51 as a pilot and landing signal officer (LSO) in July 1984. He has flown over 3,750 hours and made 1,200 arrested landings over the course of 15 deployments aboard aircraft carriers.

Manazir made one ejection from an F-14A, while an instructor.

Manazir's shore duty assignments included the positions of Aviation Liaison Officer with the Office of the Secretary of Defense (1993 - 1995), OPNAV Staff F-14 Requirements Officer (October 1998 - November 1999), and Navy Nuclear Power Training (1999 - 2001)

From 1997 to 1998, Manazir commanded the Tomcatters of Fighter Squadron 31, the USS Sacramento (AOE-1) from January 2003 to July 2004, the USS Nimitz (CVN-68) from March 2007 to August 2009, and Carrier Strike Group 8, which embarked on the USS Dwight D. Eisenhower (CVN-69) from September 2011 to June 2013.

Manazir has deployed at least 11 times to the Persian Gulf and the Pacific. Between July 2001 to December 2002, he was the executive officer of the USS Carl Vinson (CVN-70). In 2007, Manazir supported strikes in Iraq and Afghanistan while commanding the Nimitz off the coast of Iran as tensions mounted between the country and the West.

Manazir has served as an action officer in the Office of the Secretary of Defense, on the chief of naval operations staff as F-14 requirements officer and for the commander, Naval Air Forces as the assistant chief of staff for readiness.

As a flag officer, Manazir served as director, strike aircraft, weapons and carrier programs on the chief of naval operations staff (N880) from August 2009 to September 2011. From 2013 to 2016, he was the Director for Air Warfare, OPNAV N98 responsible for building and budgeting for naval aviation requirements. One of Manazir's key undertakings as OPNAV's Director of Air Warfare was to develop the framework and strategic planning for Naval Integrated Fire Control-Counter Air (NIFC-CA), which establishes best practices and tactical procedures for future air warfare.

From June 2016 until his retirement in July 2017, Manazir served as the deputy chief of naval operations for warfare systems, OPNAV N9. In that role, he was responsible for facilitating training, maintenance, and modernization of the Navy's warfare systems.

Manazir has represented a multifaceted initiative to sustain the Navy's global presence that protects U.S. citizens and interests around the world, with an eye toward continuing the success of the Optimized Fleet Response Plan.

== Civilian career ==
In 2017, Manazir joined The Boeing Company as a vice president. He began in Government Operations as vice president, Navy Systems, representing Boeing's products and services with the U.S. Navy leadership. Manazir's role as Vice President of Business Development Lead for Boeing Global Services (BGS) includes working with industry and government leaders to enhance awareness on the roles Boeing can play in the pursuit of national security policy solutions. Manazir has played a key role in Boeing's successful campaign strategies for the F/A-18 Super Hornet, MQ-25 Stingray, and the E-7 Wedgetail.

Manazir is the Executive Chairman of the National Defense University Foundation. He also serves on the boards of The Tailhook Association, the Association of Naval Aviation, and the National Capital Region Navy League.

Manazir has made various videos explaining his exploits, including on Aircrew Interview and Ward Carroll's YouTube channels.

== Awards and accolades ==
Manazir has received various personal and campaign awards including the Navy distinguished Service Medal, six Legions of Merit, the Defense Meritorious Service Medal, two Meritorious Service Medals, and two Strike Flight Air Medals. Manazir received the Navy League 1991 Commander "Bug" Roach Golden Paddles Award as CVW-11 Staff LSO for safely recovering an A-6 Intruder with a partially ejected Bombardier/Navigator aboard USS Abraham Lincoln.

Naval Aviator Badge
Legion of Merit w/ 5 gold award star
Defense Meritorious Service Medal w/ 1 oak leaf cluster	Meritorious Service Medal w/ 1 award stars	Air Medal with award numeral 2
Navy and Marine Corps Commendation Medal w/ 2 award stars	Navy and Marine Corps Achievement Medal w/ 1 award star	Joint Meritorious Unit Award w/ 1 oak leaf cluster
Navy Unit Commendation	Navy Meritorious Unit Commendation w/ 2 bronze service stars	Navy "E" Ribbon with wreathed Battle E device
National Defense Service Medal with 1 service star	Armed Forces Expeditionary Medal with 1 service star	Southwest Asia Service Medal with 2 service stars
Global War on Terrorism Service Medal	Navy Sea Service Deployment Ribbon w/ 2 silver service stars and 3 bronze service stars	Navy Sea Service Deployment Ribbon
Kuwait Liberation Medal (Saudi Arabia)	Kuwait Liberation Medal (Kuwait)	Navy Expert Pistol Shot Medal
Command at Sea insignia
Office of the Secretary of Defense Identification Badge

== Publications ==
- "Learn How to Lead to Win: 33 Powerful Stories and Leadership Lessons" (biography; 2023)
