= Lockheed Martin Sea Ghost =

2013–18 unmanned combat aircraft proposal

Sea Ghost

General information
- Type: Unmanned Combat Aerial Vehicle
- Manufacturer: Lockheed Martin

The Lockheed Martin Sea Ghost was a proposal to fulfill the United States Navy's requirement for an Unmanned Carrier-Launched Airborne Surveillance and Strike aircraft.

On 14 August 2013, Lockheed Martin was awarded a $15 million contract to develop the airframe of their UCLASS entry. Contracts of the same amount were awarded to Boeing, General Atomics, and Northrop Grumman for their competing designs. In August 2018, Boeing was selected over Lockheed Martin and the other entrants.

== Design ==
The Sea Ghost incorporated technologies from the F-35C Lightning II and RQ-170 Sentinel UAV, both other Lockheed designs. It had a bat-wing fuselage and emissions and bandwidth management for multi-spectral stealth. Lockheed claimed it could reduce manpower requirements because a single operator would be able to operate multiple aircraft. Lockheed had a full-scale mock-up of the design to look at fit checks when the pre-solicitation was issued. The flying wing design was chosen because it was well suited for the missions intended for the aircraft, and the company had experience with it; it is aerodynamically efficient, allows for very low signatures, is structurally simplistic, and is easy to manufacture. The Sea Ghost would use sea spray optimized stealth materials developed for the F-35. It would have range and endurance, but not the weapons payload capability of a long-range strike platform, such as the A-6 Intruder; making it carry large payloads at long ranges would affect affordability. It was planned with open architecture avionics to have the ability to put new sensors or mission systems onboard over time, and was made to operate autonomously with the operator intervening if necessary.

The Sea Ghost competed against the Northrop Grumman X-47B, the General Atomics Sea Avenger, and the Boeing Phantom Ray, or operational versions of those aircraft, in the program.

Lockheed Martin stressed the flying wing design of the Sea Ghost had the "inherent" stealth needed for the Navy to operate in future high-threat environments. They believed they had an advantage in that it was designed from the outset to be stealthy, and that the Navy had to “start out with the right shape of the aircraft” because capability improvements may not be viable if they don't. A Request for Proposals (RFP) released by the Navy for the UCLASS in early April 2014 called for a strike and reconnaissance platform that would gain additional capabilities over time, including the ability to be refueled aerially, and to act as a tanker itself.

In early 2016, the UCLASS was changed into the Carrier Based Aerial Refueling System (CBARS), changing the focus from high-end strike to a more basic air vehicle functioning primarily as an aerial tanker. Although pursuing a more basic design could favor General Atomics and Boeing wing-body-tail submissions, Lockheed believed a flying wing could be affordable while allowing more room for growth. By selecting a basic flying wing design, weapons, sensors, and stealth could be more easily added to the existing airframe to allow it to penetrate into a contested environment.

== See also ==
Related development

- Lockheed Martin F-35 Lightning II
- Lockheed Martin RQ-170 Sentinel

Aircraft of comparable role, configuration, and era

- Boeing X-45
- Mikoyan Skat
- Northrop Grumman X-47B

Related lists

- List of experimental aircraft
