= Carrier Strike Group 8 =

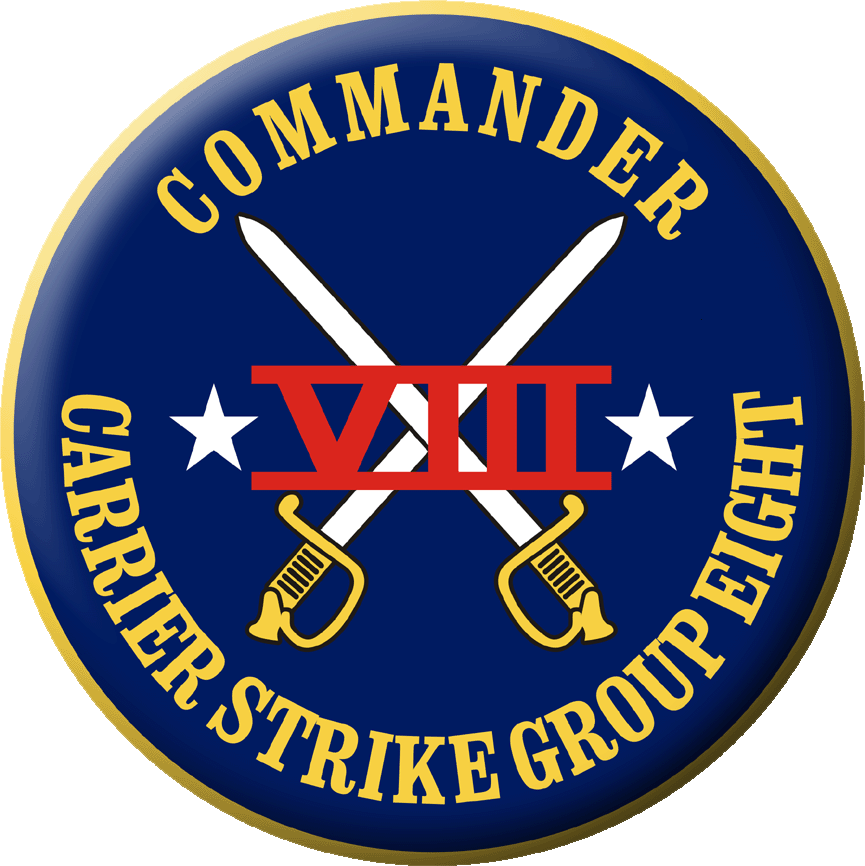
- Carrier Strike Group 8 emblem
- Founded: 1 October 2004; 22 years ago
- Country: United States of America
- Branch: United States Navy
- Type: Carrier Strike Group
- Role: Naval air/surface warfare
- Part of: United States Fleet Forces Command
- Garrison/HQ: Naval Station Norfolk, Virginia
- Website: Official Website

Commanders
- Commander: Rear Admiral Matthew J. Kawas, USN
- Chief of Staff: Captain Steven Bellack, USN
- Command Master Chief: CMDCM (SW/AW) Michael Bates, USN

Commander, Carrier Strike Group 8, abbreviated as CCSG-8 or COMCARSTRKGRU 8, is one of five U.S. Navy carrier strike groups currently assigned to the United States Fleet Forces Command. As of 2018 the group flagship is the Nimitz-class aircraft carrier USS Harry S. Truman (CVN-75). As of 2026, the other units of the group are Carrier Air Wing One, the ships of Destroyer Squadron 28 (Note: As of 2021, Destroyer Squadron 28 was made up of USS Bainbridge (DDG-96), USS Cole (DDG-67), USS Gravely (DDG-107), and USS Jason Dunham (DDG-109)) as well as the Royal Norwegian Navy's frigate HNoMS Fridtjof Nansen (F310), which joined the strike group for one deployment.

The group was placed under NATO command as a result of the buildup of Russian forces on the Ukrainian border prior to the 2022 Russian invasion of Ukraine.

== History ==
During 1994, USS Hue City (CG-66) was a unit of Carrier Group 8. During 1999, the previous Carrier Group 8's flagship was Eisenhower.

In May and June 1998, Vella Gulf completed a two-month BALTOPS Cruise, taking part in the 26th annual maritime exercise BALTOPS '98 in the Western Baltic Sea from 8–19 June 1998. During the exercise, Commander, Carrier Group 8, commanded the exercise from the ship.

From November 2001, at the commencement of Multinational Interception Force (MIF) operations in the Persian Gulf, Royal Australian Navy ships came under the control ('chopped to the OPCON') of Commander Carrier Group 8, Rear Admiral Mark P. Fitzgerald. Fitzgerald was also serving as Commander Task Force 50 (CTF 50) embarked in the carrier USS Theodore Roosevelt (CVN-71).

The group was established by redesignation of the former Carrier Group 8 on 1 October 2004.

The Strike Group deployed on 2 January 2010 to the Middle East to help with operations by the U.S. 5th and 6th Fleets.

Effective 1 October 2012, when not deployed, Carrier Strike Group 8 is part of the U.S. Fleet Forces Command, and its commander reports to Commander Task Force 80, the director of Fleet Forces' Maritime Headquarters. Carrier Strike Group 8 is designated Task Group 80.3.

On 6 October 2014, U.S. Fleet Forces Command announced that the Carrier Strike Group 8 command staff would deploy with Truman, instead of Eisenhower, in accordance with the U.S. Navy's Optimized Fleet Response Plan (O-FRP). This change does not affect the other ships or units that are otherwise assigned to either strike groups.

On 24 January 2022 it was announced that the strike group had been placed under NATO command for planned exercises in the Mediterranean Sea. This was the first time a full US carrier strike group had been placed under NATO command since the Cold War.

On 14 December 2024 the strike group entered the U.S. Central Command area of responsibility, for the first time since March 2020, and took part in Operation Prosperity Guardian in the Red Sea.

== Past Commanders ==
- Rear Admiral Jay L. Johnson
- Rear Admiral Charles S. Abbot, May 1994 - July 1995
- Rear Admiral William J. Fallon, July 1995 - February 1996
- Rear Admiral Gregory G. Johnson, February 1996 - August 1997
- Rear Admiral Mark P. Fitzgerald
- Rear Admiral George E. Mayer
- Rear Admiral H. Denby Starling II, July 2003 - July 2004
- Rear Admiral William J. McCarthy, July 2004 - July 2005
- Rear Admiral Allen G. Myers, July 2005 - June 2007
- Rear Admiral Philip H. Cullom
- Rear Admiral Kurt W. Tidd
- Rear Admiral Philip S. Davidson
- Rear Admiral Michael C. Manazir, September 2011 - June 2013
- Rear Admiral Michael M. Gilday, June 2013 - June 2014
- Rear Admiral Victorino G. Mercado, June 2014 - April 2015
- Rear Admiral Bret C. Batchelder, April 2015 - July 2016
- Rear Admiral Dale E. Horan, July 2016 - September 2017
- Rear Admiral Eugene H. Black III, September 2017 - April 2019
- Rear Admiral Andrew J. Loiselle, April 2019 - June 2020
- Rear Admiral Ryan B. Scholl, June 2020 - August 2021
- Rear Admiral Curt A. Renshaw, August 2021 - May 2022
- Rear Admiral Paul C. Spedero Jr., May 2022 - June 2023
- Rear Admiral Sean R. Bailey, June 2023 - August 2025
- Rear Admiral Forrest Young, August 2025 - July 2026
- Rear Admiral Matthew J. Kawas, July 2026 - present

== Carrier Air Wing ==
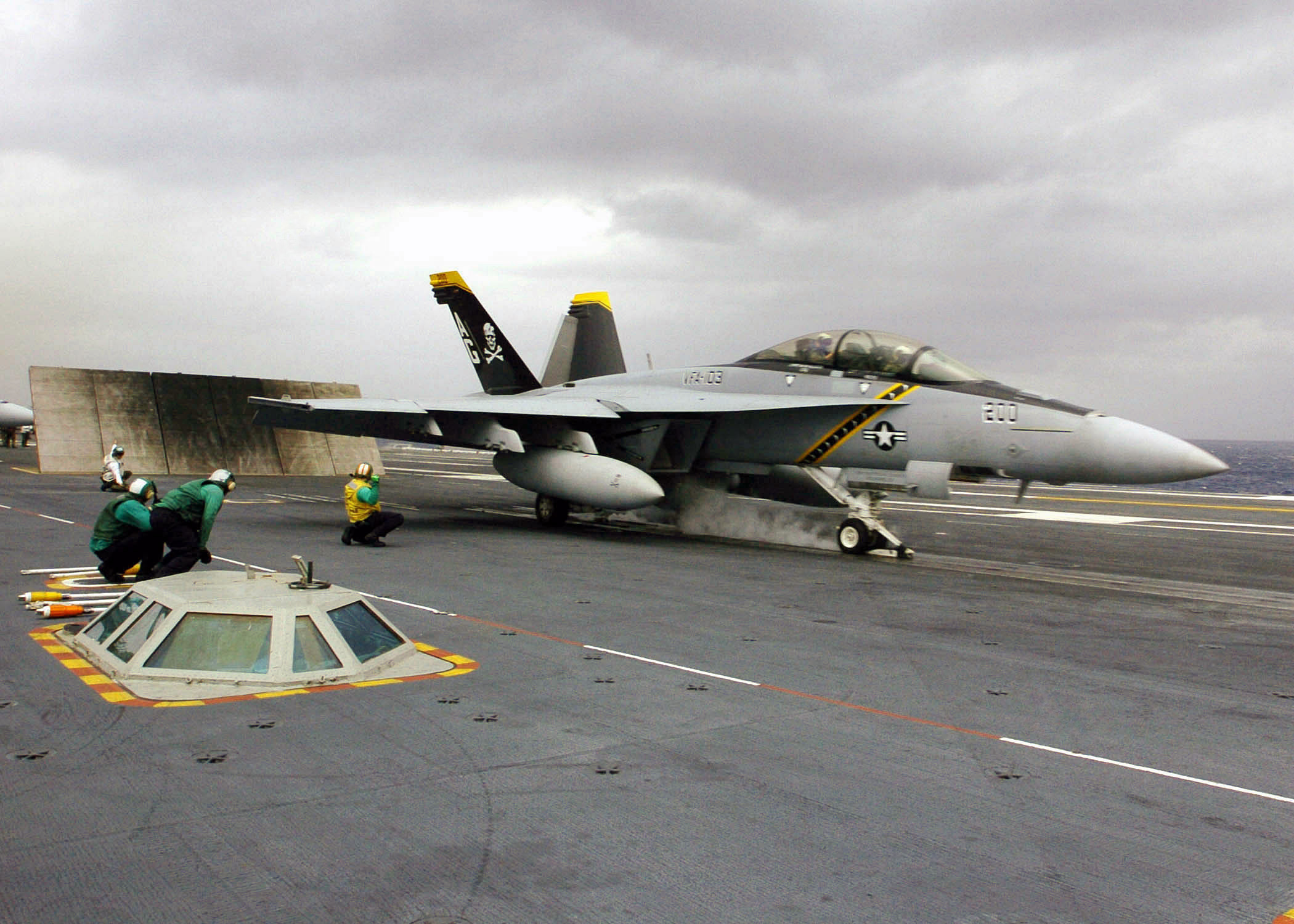
An F/A-18F Super Hornet from VFA-103 prepares to launch from Dwight D. Eisenhower

Carrier Air Wing One comprises:

- Strike Fighter Squadron 11, (VFA-11)
- Strike Fighter Squadron 81, (VFA-81)
- Strike Fighter Squadron 34, (VFA-34)
- Strike Fighter Squadron 211, (VFA-211)
- Carrier Airborne Early Warning Squadron 126, (VAW-126)
- Electronic attack Squadron 140, (VAQ-137)
- Fleet Logistics Support Squadron 40 Det. 2, (VRC-40)
- Helicopter Sea Combat Squadron 11, (HSC-11)
- Helicopter Maritime Strike Squadron 72, (HSM-72)

== Aircraft operated ==
- F/A-18E/F Super Hornet
- EA-18 Growler
- E-2C Hawkeye
- C-2A Greyhound
- MH-60S Seahawk
- MH-60R Seahawk
