= Pacific Deterrence Initiative =

U.S. defense initiative to counter China in the Indo-Pacific

The Pacific Deterrence Initiative (PDI) is a United States Department of Defense framework established in fiscal year 2021 to enhance deterrence capabilities in the Indo-Pacific region and counter the People's Republic of China's growing military assertiveness. Created through Section 1251 of the National Defense Authorization Act for Fiscal Year 2021, PDI functions as a budget display mechanism highlighting targeted investments in military capabilities and infrastructure west of the International Date Line.

PDI represents the largest regional deterrence investment since the Cold War, with congressional authorizations totaling over $40 billion from fiscal years 2021–2024. The initiative was explicitly modeled after the European Deterrence Initiative, which Congress created in 2014 following Russia's invasion of Crimea.

== Background ==
The Pacific Deterrence Initiative emerged from growing congressional concern about China's military modernization and increasingly assertive behavior throughout the Indo-Pacific region. By 2020, military leaders had concluded that China's anti-access/area-denial capabilities were eroding American military advantage in the western Pacific.

PDI's urgency was heightened by what became known as the "Davidson window" - the strategic timeframe between 2021 and 2027 during which military analysts believe China will develop sufficient capabilities to attempt control of Taiwan.

PDI's formal proposal emerged in July 2020 when Senators Jim Inhofe (R-OK) and Jack Reed (D-RI) published a joint op-ed establishing the framework for the initiative. Section 1251 of the FY2021 NDAA formally created PDI with five core objectives: increased presence, enhanced prepositioning, strengthened capabilities, increased readiness, and National Defense Strategy implementation.

== Budget and capabilities ==
Congressional support has grown substantially, with lawmakers consistently increasing funding above Pentagon requests. Congress authorized $7.1 billion for FY2022 (39% above the $5.1 billion request), $11.5 billion for FY2023, and $14.71 billion for FY2024 (62% above the $9.06 billion request).

Key capabilities include long-range precision fires (Army Long-Range Hypersonic Weapon, Precision Strike Missile), air and missile defense (Guam Defense System as INDOPACOM's #1 unfunded priority), and distributed logistics networks across the first and second island chains. The Heritage Foundation has emphasized the importance of immediate action on Guam defense systems and deterrence by denial approaches in the Indo-Pacific region.

== Implementation and challenges ==
PDI emphasizes partnerships with key allies including Japan (primary logistics hub), Australia (AUKUS cooperation), Philippines (Enhanced Defense Cooperation Agreement sites), and QUAD coordination.

However, PDI faces significant implementation challenges as it functions as a "budget display" rather than dedicated appropriations, limiting its effectiveness compared to the European Deterrence Initiative. Congressional leaders have criticized Pentagon implementation as platform-focused rather than capability-focused, leading to repeated funding redirections. INDOPACOM continues requesting approximately $11 billion in unfunded priorities beyond Pentagon proposals for FY2025.

== See also ==
- European Deterrence Initiative
- United States Indo-Pacific Command
- Davidson window
- First island chain
- Island chain strategy
- Pivot to Asia
- Anti-access/area denial
