= General Atomics MQ-20 Avenger =

Unmanned combat aircraft demonstrator built by General Atomics

MQ-20 Avenger (Predator C)
- Predator-C Avenger

General information
- Type: Unmanned combat aerial vehicle
- Manufacturer: General Atomics Aeronautical Systems
- Status: Operationally ready
- Primary user: United States Air Force
- Number built: 9

History
- First flight: 4 April 2009
- Developed from: General Atomics MQ-9 Reaper

The General Atomics MQ-20 Avenger (formerly Predator C) is a developmental unmanned combat aerial vehicle built by General Atomics Aeronautical Systems for the U.S. military.

== Design and development ==
Unlike the previous MQ-1 Predator and MQ-9 Reaper (Predator B) drones, the Avenger is powered by a turbofan engine, and its design includes stealth features such as internal weapons storage and an S-shaped exhaust for reduced infrared and radar signatures. Its first flight occurred on 4 April 2009.

The Avenger will support the same weapons as the MQ-9, and carry the Lynx synthetic aperture radar and a version of the F-35 Lightning II's electro-optical targeting system (EOTS), called the Advanced Low-observable Embedded Reconnaissance Targeting (ALERT) system. The Avenger will use the same ground support infrastructure as the MQ-1 and MQ-9, including the ground control station and existing communications networks.

The Avenger can also carry and deploy other unmanned systems to achieve stand-off survivability and achieve a penetrating capability at the same time.

=== Weapons testing ===
On 28 November 2023, an Avenger test deployed the Advanced Air-Launched Effects (A2LE) small uncrewed aerial system (sUAS) from its internal weapons bay over Dugway Proving Ground, Utah.

== Operational history ==
=== Flight testing ===
The first flight of the first prototype Avenger occurred on 4 April 2009 at the company's Grey Butte Field Airport Flight Operations Facility in Palmdale, California. The aircraft took off and landed without any discrepancies and was ready to fly again once refueled. Following flights were performed successfully on 13 and 14 April. The second prototype Avenger performed its first flight on 12 January 2012, meeting all performance objectives and refining the first prototype design to an operational capability. The Tail 2 prototype featured a four-foot longer fuselage to accommodate larger payloads and more fuel. This larger Avenger can carry a larger payload of up to 3,500 pounds (1,600 kg) of weapons internally and on its wing hard points.

On 15 February 2012, the Air Force cancelled its MQ-X program, which was supposed to find an aircraft to replace the MQ-9 Reaper. The Sea Avenger variant was part of the Navy's cancelled Unmanned Carrier-Launched Airborne Surveillance and Strike (UCLASS) program.

On 15 November 2012, the Avenger flew for three hours while being controlled by the General Atomics Advanced Cockpit Ground Control Station (GCS). The Advanced Cockpit GCS has a wrap-around visual display and multi-dimensional moving map to increase situational awareness and reduce pilot workload. The Advanced Cockpit GCS has flown an MQ-1 Predator and is planning to fly an MQ-9 Reaper as part of an Air Force initiative to enable interoperability with all USAF Remote Piloted Aircraft (RPA).

In July 2013, a third Avenger was scheduled to begin flight testing. Assembly of the fourth Avenger was expected to be finished by spring 2014.

On 27 October 2016, General Atomics flew an extended-range Avenger featuring wings extended by 3.2 m (10 ft) to 23.2 m (76 ft). The extended wings add about 1,000 kg (2,200 lb) of fuel totaling 4,600 kg (10,100 lb), extending endurance from 15 hours to 20 hours but reducing internal payload to 3,000 lb (1,400 kg). Since its first flight in 2009, the Avenger has completed more than 13,000 flight hours, reaching 11,000 hours in July 2016 and accumulating most of those hours within the past three years.

=== Potential deployments ===
In December 2011, it was reported that the Air Force had ordered an Avenger and that it would be deployed to Afghanistan. "This aircraft will be used as a test asset and will provide a significantly increased weapons and sensors payload capacity on an aircraft that will be able to fly to targets much more rapidly than the MQ-9 [Reaper] UAS," the USAF said in an announcement. "Since it has an internal weapons bay and four hardpoints on each wing it will also allow greater flexibility and will accommodate a large selection of next generation sensor and weapons payloads."

The aircraft ordered was the original Tail 1 prototype version. This announcement sparked rumors that the aircraft would be deployed to monitor neighboring Iran and Pakistan. These allegations were made because the Avenger is stealthy, while the battlespace over Afghanistan is free of radar guided missiles, as well as any other anti-aircraft weapons. The announcement also came two weeks after the Iran–US RQ-170 incident. The Air Force responded by clarifying that the purchase was initiated in July of that year, well before the incident.

However, the Air Force later clarified that the Avenger was being purchased only as a test asset, and that it was not being sent to Afghanistan. Discrepancies in the solicitation are believed to have caused the misinterpretation. After testing, the Air Force decided that the Avenger version they evaluated offered only modest improvements over the MQ-9 in terms of speed, payload, and reduced signature, and didn't meet survivability and reliability requirements to survive in contested environments needed to warrant buying a new aircraft of the type.

With the Taliban takeover of Afghanistan in 2021, the US has lost access to airbases inside the country that are necessary for striking targets in neighboring Pakistan. Due to the longer distances from potential targets, General Atomics has pitched the Avenger to the Central Intelligence Agency as a better drone for the mission. The jet-powered Avenger can fly 1,800 mi (2,900 km) from its operating base and stay airborne for 18 hours.

=== Export ===
==== Canada ====
General Atomics has offered the Predator C Avenger to Canada as a contender for its Joint Unmanned Surveillance and Target Acquisition System (JUSTAS) armed UAV project. In 2016, the JUSTAS project was prioritized by the Royal Canadian Air Force (RCAF) and Liberal government. The RCAF has requested that the drones be armed, therefore making the General Atomics Avenger the only suitable contender, as the Northrop Grumman RQ-4 Global Hawk is unarmed.

Following a formal Invitation to Qualify issued by the Government of Canada, only General Atomics and L3 Technologies MAS were selected as being qualified suppliers allowed to submit a bid. Canada will begin to refine the preliminary requirements with General Atomics and L3 Technologies until a formal request for proposals and contract is awarded. On 11 February 2022, the formal RFP was released to qualified suppliers with an expected contract awarded in 2024. On 19 December 2023 the Government of Canada announced the acquisition of 11 MQ-9B drones from General Atomics in $2.5 billion CAD deal.

==== India ====
On 22 September 2015, the U.S. stated they backed India's membership in the Missile Technology Control Regime, which would enable them to buy armed drones. Two days later, the Indian Air Force sent a letter to General Atomics saying it wanted to purchase the Avenger.

As of 17 August 2017, General Atomics Aeronautical Systems (GA-ASI) is in the early stages of negotiating the potential sale of as many as 100 Predator C Avenger remotely piloted aircraft to an unidentified international customer. The renewed international interest is believed to be led by India, which has requested access to the capability as a potential follow-on to the planned acquisition of as many as 20 GA-ASI MQ-9 UAVs, 10 each for its Army and Navy and wants to acquire 100 Avenger drones for its Air Force at the cost of $8 billion.

== Variants ==
MQ-20
US military designation for the Avenger

=== Sea Avenger ===
On 3 May 2010, GA-ASI introduced Sea Avenger, a carrier-based derivative of the Predator C Avenger UAS, intended to fulfill the U.S. Navy's need for an Unmanned Carrier-Launched Airborne Surveillance and Strike (UCLASS). The Sea Avenger included a retractable electro-optical/infrared sensor, internal weapons bay, and folding wings. The aircraft's structure was designed with the flexibility to accommodate carrier suitable landing gear, tailhook, drag devices, and other provisions for carrier operations.

In April 2014, General Atomics displayed images of the Sea Avenger at the Navy League Sea Air and Space exposition. As requirements for the UCLASS program were altered from a high-end strike aircraft to an ISR machine operating in permissive environments, the Sea Avenger was modified accordingly. It appeared to have four external hardpoints and a small weapons bay, a wing-mounted buddy-refueling store to perform as an aerial tanker, and a larger airframe with a larger engine.

If Navy requirements favored a UAV optimized for permissive ISR over broadband stealth, the Sea Avenger would better meet them, as it was originally pitched as having a reduced signature to be "stealthier" than other aircraft. Sea Avenger stealth capabilities seemed to be limited to higher frequencies like C, X, and Ku bands, instead of broadband stealth effective against low-frequency radar bands like VHF and UHF.

In October 2017, General Atomics released images of its submission for the Navy's MQ-25 Stingray, an unmanned aerial tanker that formed out of the UCLASS effort. The aircraft is an Avenger-based wing-body-tail design with a standard D-704 buddy tank refueling system that has an electro-optical ball like the Predator and Reaper, landing gear that pulls into the fuselage, and a system for maneuvering around the flight deck using gestures from the flight crew. Though specifics are not known, the basic requirements will have the Stingray deliver about 15,000 lb (6,800 kg) of fuel 500 nautical miles (580 mi; 930 km) from the aircraft carrier to increase the F/A-18 Super Hornet's combat radius from 450 to 700 nmi (520 to 810 mi; 830 to 1,300 km).

GA-ASI's design is larger than the Sea Avenger and is powered by the Pratt & Whitney PW815 high-bypass turbofan, the same engine used on the Gulfstream G600. Generating 16,000 lb (7,300 kg) of thrust, it is four times more powerful than the Predator C's PW545B turbofan, and the most powerful engine used by any Stingray competitor. In addition to structural reinforcements and additional systems for carrier operations, the aircraft is fitted with the same landing gear and arresting hook as the Super Hornet and has space available for future growth to perform ISR and strike missions; it would be able to fuel four to six aircraft.

The MQ-25 contract was awarded to Boeing in August 2018.

=== Avenger ER ===
On 27 October 2016, General Atomics Aeronautical Systems, Inc. (GA-ASI) conducted the maiden flight of the Avenger ER. GA-ASI extended the wingspan of the Avenger ER by 3.2 m (10 ft) to 23.2 m (76 ft), and enlarged its fuel capacity by 1,000 kg (2,200 lb) to 4,600 kg (10,100 lb) compared to previous specifications. The aircraft carries up to 1,360 kg (3,000 lb) in its internal payload bay, 227 kg (500 lb) less than previously described.

The modifications extend its endurance from the original 15 hours to 20 hours. The Avenger ER uses a modified fuselage design (completed in 2012) extended by four feet (to 13.4 m (44 ft)) to accommodate larger payloads and more fuel. Earlier in 2016, the U.S. Federal Aviation Administration granted GA-ASI an experimental certificate that allows it to fly the Avenger in the National Airspace System.

From 24 to 25 January 2018, an Avenger ER set a new endurance record of 23.4 continuous hours, exceeding the 20 hour flight test goal and reflecting a 10-hour improvement over the baseline Predator C Avenger. The Avenger ER also has an increased maximum gross takeoff weight (MGTOW) of 19,500 lb (8,800 kg) using a co-cured composite center wing and heavyweight landing gear as well as a dual redundant, light weight brake control capability using a lightweight hybrid linear anti-lock brake system.

== Operators ==
United States

- United States Air Force – one aircraft
- Unidentified U.S. government customer – up to seven aircraft

== Specifications ==
Data from

General characteristics

- Crew: 2 (ground control)
- Length: 44 ft 0 in (13 m)
- Wingspan: 66 ft 0 in (20 m) sweep angle 17°
- Max takeoff weight: 18,200 lb (8,255 kg)
- Fuel capacity: 7,900 lb (3,600 kg)
- Powerplant: 1 × Pratt & Whitney Canada PW545B turbofan, 3,991 lbf (17.75 kN) thrust

Performance

- Maximum speed: 460 mph (740 km/h, 400 kn)
- Cruise speed: 402 mph (648 km/h, 350 kn)
- Endurance: 18 hours
- Service ceiling: 50,000 ft (15,240 m)

Armament
Internal weapons bay with 3,500 lb (1,600 kg) capacity. 6 external hardpoints. 6,500 lb (2,900 kg) payload total.

- Missiles
  - AGM-114 Hellfire
- Bombs
  - GBU-39 SDB – 250 lb (110 kg) bombs
  - GBU-12 Paveway II, GBU-38 JDAM – 500 lb (230 kg) bombs
  - GBU-16 Paveway II, GBU-32 JDAM – 1,000 lb (450 kg) bombs
  - GBU-31 JDAM – 2,000 lb (910 kg) bombs
- Other
  - Legion IRST Pod

Avionics

- Lynx synthetic aperture radar
- AESA wide-area surveillance sensor

== See also ==
Related development

- General Atomics MQ-1 Predator
- General Atomics MQ-1C Gray Eagle
- General Atomics MQ-9 Reaper

Aircraft of comparable role, configuration, and era

- Guizhou WZ-7 Soaring Dragon
- Chengdu WZ-10
- EADS Barracuda
- Kratos XQ-58 Valkyrie
- Scaled Composites 401
- S-70 Okhotnik
- DRDO Ghatak
- Shahed Saegheh
- Boeing MQ-28 Ghost Bat

Related lists

- List of unmanned aerial vehicles
