= Denys Overholser =

American electrical engineer (1939–2026)

Denys D. Overholser
- Born: April 30, 1939; Glendale, California, U.S.
- Died: April 28, 2026 (aged 86)
- Education: Oregon State University (BS)
- Occupation: Engineer
- Known for: Radar cross-section prediction and faceted low-observable design work
- Engineering career
- Discipline: Electrical engineering, stealth technology
- Employer(s): Boeing; Lockheed (Skunk Works); MIT Lincoln Laboratory
- Projects: Lockheed Have Blue; Lockheed F-117 Nighthawk

Denys Dale Overholser (April 30, 1939 – April 28, 2026) was an American electrical engineer and stealth technology specialist known for his work on radar cross-section (RCS) prediction and low-observable aircraft design at Lockheed's Skunk Works. During the development of Lockheed Have Blue, the experimental demonstrator that led to the Lockheed F-117 Nighthawk, Overholser recognized the practical significance of the diffraction theory of Soviet physicist Pyotr Ufimtsev and helped apply it to the prediction and reduction of aircraft radar returns.

== Early life and education ==
Overholser was born in Glendale, California, on April 30, 1939. He attended Dallas High School and Oregon State University, where he was a member of both wrestling teams. He graduated from Oregon State in 1962 with degrees in electrical engineering and mathematics, and later earned graduate degrees in systems engineering and operations research.

== Career ==
=== Boeing and Lockheed ===
After graduating from Oregon State, Overholser joined Boeing, where he worked in systems engineering on missile projects. He was selected from among approximately 1,500 engineers for computer training. Overholser later joined Lockheed's Skunk Works, where much of his professional work remained classified.

=== Have Blue and the F-117 ===
In the mid-1970s, the Defense Advanced Research Projects Agency and the United States Air Force pursued a low-observable aircraft program in response to the increasing effectiveness of radar-guided air defenses. Lockheed's eventual entry became the Lockheed Have Blue demonstrator, which in turn led to the F-117. The mathematical problem facing stealth aircraft designers was the prediction of how aircraft shapes would scatter electromagnetic energy. Earlier aircraft had used radar-absorbing materials and some signature-reduction features, but the design of an aircraft whose overall shape was driven primarily by RCS requirements required practical methods for predicting radar return from candidate shapes.

Overholser recognized that the work of Soviet physicist Pyotr Ufimtsev could be adapted for practical RCS prediction. Lockheed used this insight in a computer program known as Echo 1, which computed RCS from different viewing angles and wavelengths. Because the available computers could handle flat surfaces more readily than smooth compound curves, the Lockheed design used a set of planar facets.

== Death ==
Overholser died on April 28, 2026, at the age of 86.

== Awards and recognition ==
Overholser received the Combat Survivability Award for Technical Achievement from the National Defense Industrial Association. In 2016, the Oregon Chapter of the National Wrestling Hall of Fame recognized him as an Outstanding American and he was inducted into the Oregon Aviation Hall of Honor.

== See also ==
- Richard C. Scherrer
- Ben Rich
