= Lockheed Martin X-44 (UAV) =

American unmanned aerial vehicle

X-44A
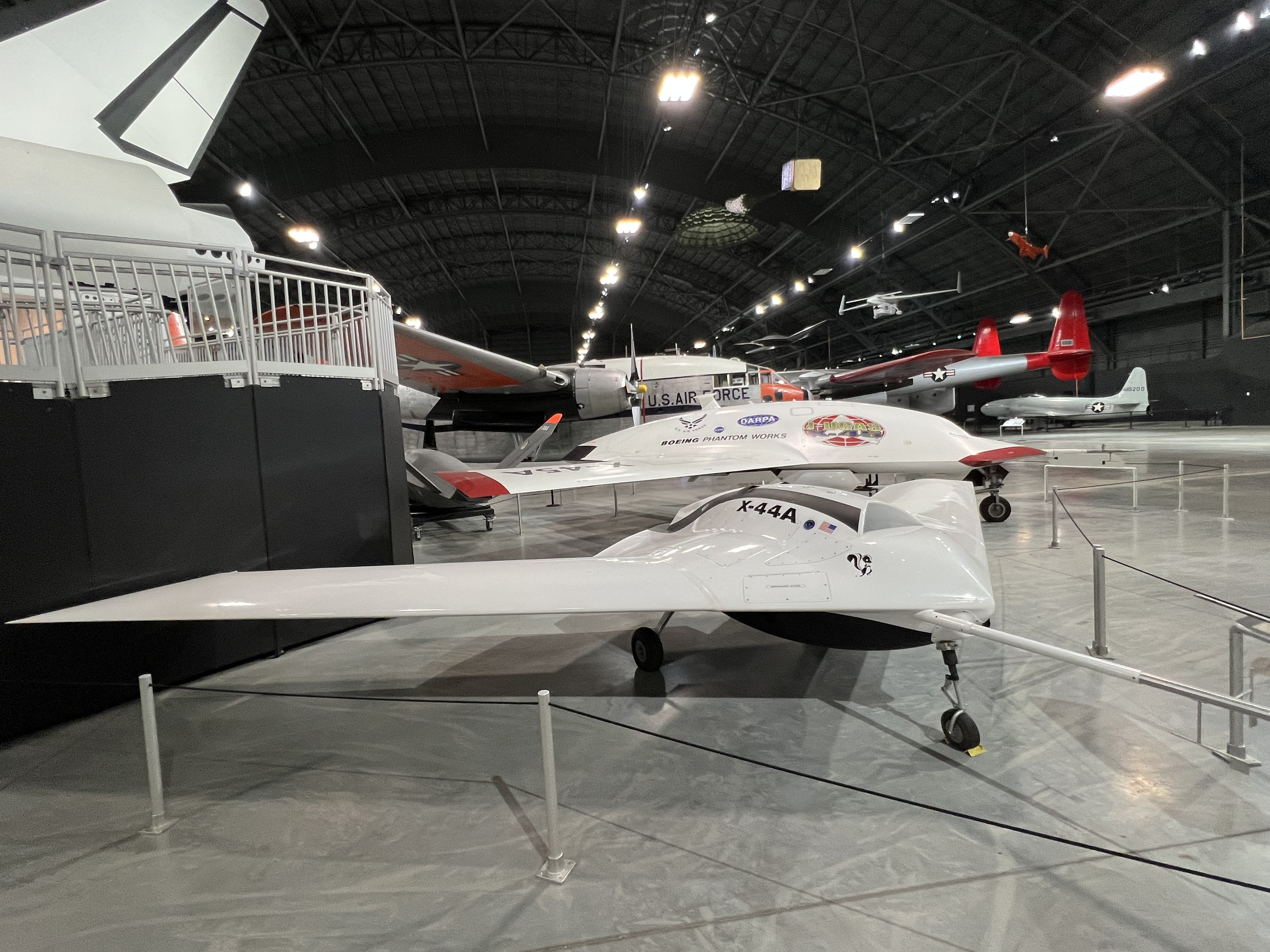
- X-44A at the National Museum of the United States Air Force.

General information
- Type: High-altitude endurance unmanned aerial vehicle (UAV) technology demonstrator
- Manufacturer: Skunk Works

History
- First flight: 2001

The Lockheed Martin X-44A is an unmanned aerial vehicle (UAV) technology demonstrator built by the Lockheed Martin Skunk Works.

== Development ==
After the 1999 cancellation of the RQ-3 Darkstar, Lockheed Martin decided to build a technology demonstrator for a potential family of flying wing UAVs that could be used for combat and non-combat roles. The resulting X-44A (although apparently unrelated to the previously developed X-44 MANTA) was built in 1999 and first flew in 2001, representing an interim design between the Darkstar and P-175 Polecat. However, Lockheed Martin kept the X-44A under wraps until February 2018.

The X-44A successfully tested multiple technologies. Its design refined tailless aircraft aerodynamics and flight controls. The test program also improved Lockheed Martin’s unmanned command and control system. It also supported other test programs, including a deck-handling demonstration for U.S. Navy carriers.

== Design ==
The X-44A is reportedly made from nano-carbon fiber and is powered by a Williams F112 turbofan engine. The wingspan of the X-44A is 30 feet (9.1 m), half of that of the RQ-170 Sentinel.

== Display ==
The X-44A is currently on display at the National Museum of the United States Air Force, near Dayton, Ohio, in the Research and Development gallery housed in Building 4, and was put on display in October of 2020.

== Specifications (X-44A) ==
Data from National Museum of the United States Air Force

General characteristics

- Crew: 0 onboard
- Powerplant: 1 × Williams F112 turbofan, 732 lbf (3.26 kN) thrust

Performance

- Maximum speed: 176 mph (283 km/h, 153 kn)
- Endurance: 1.5 hr

== Gallery ==
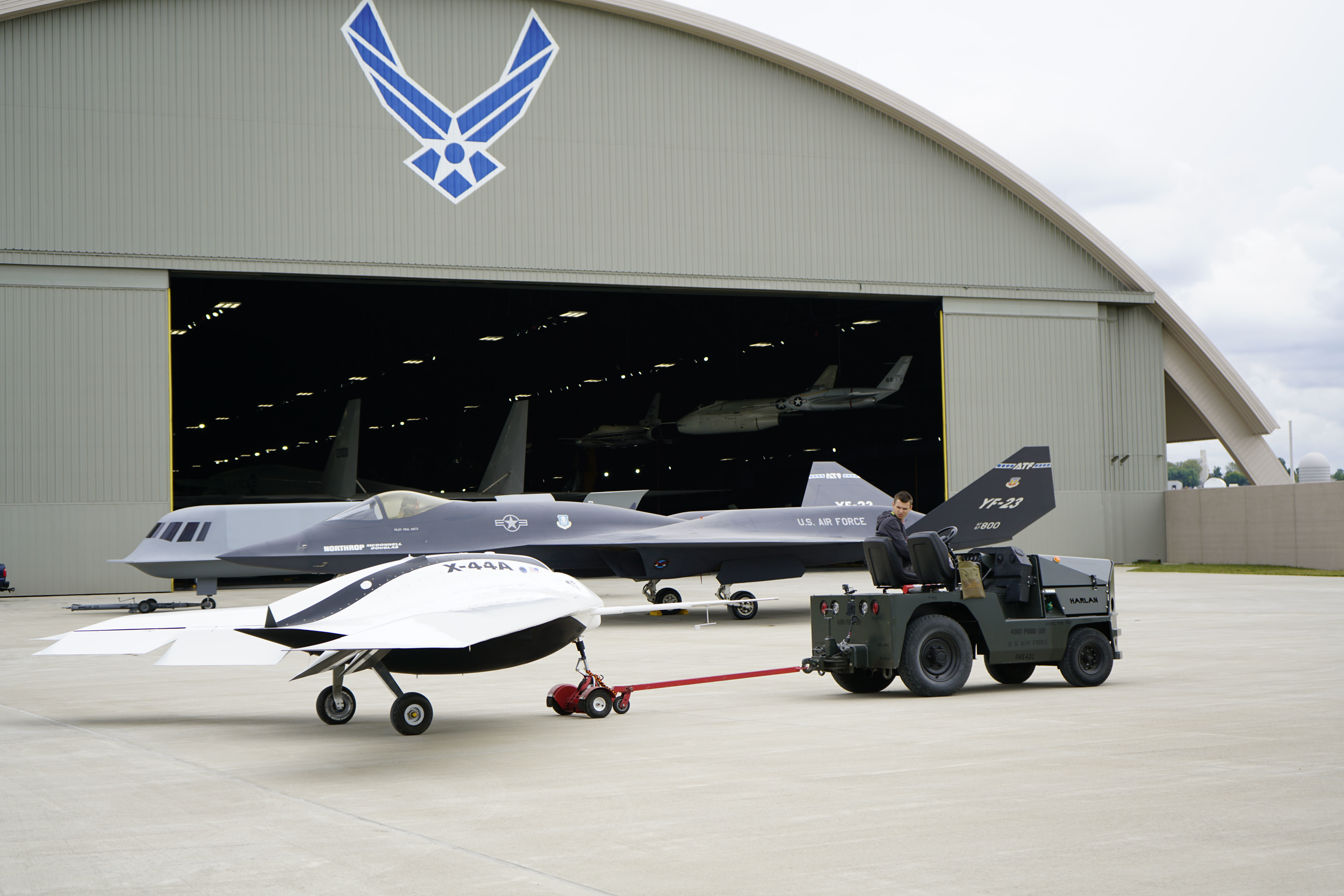
Towing the X-44A to the Research and Development Gallery at NMUSA

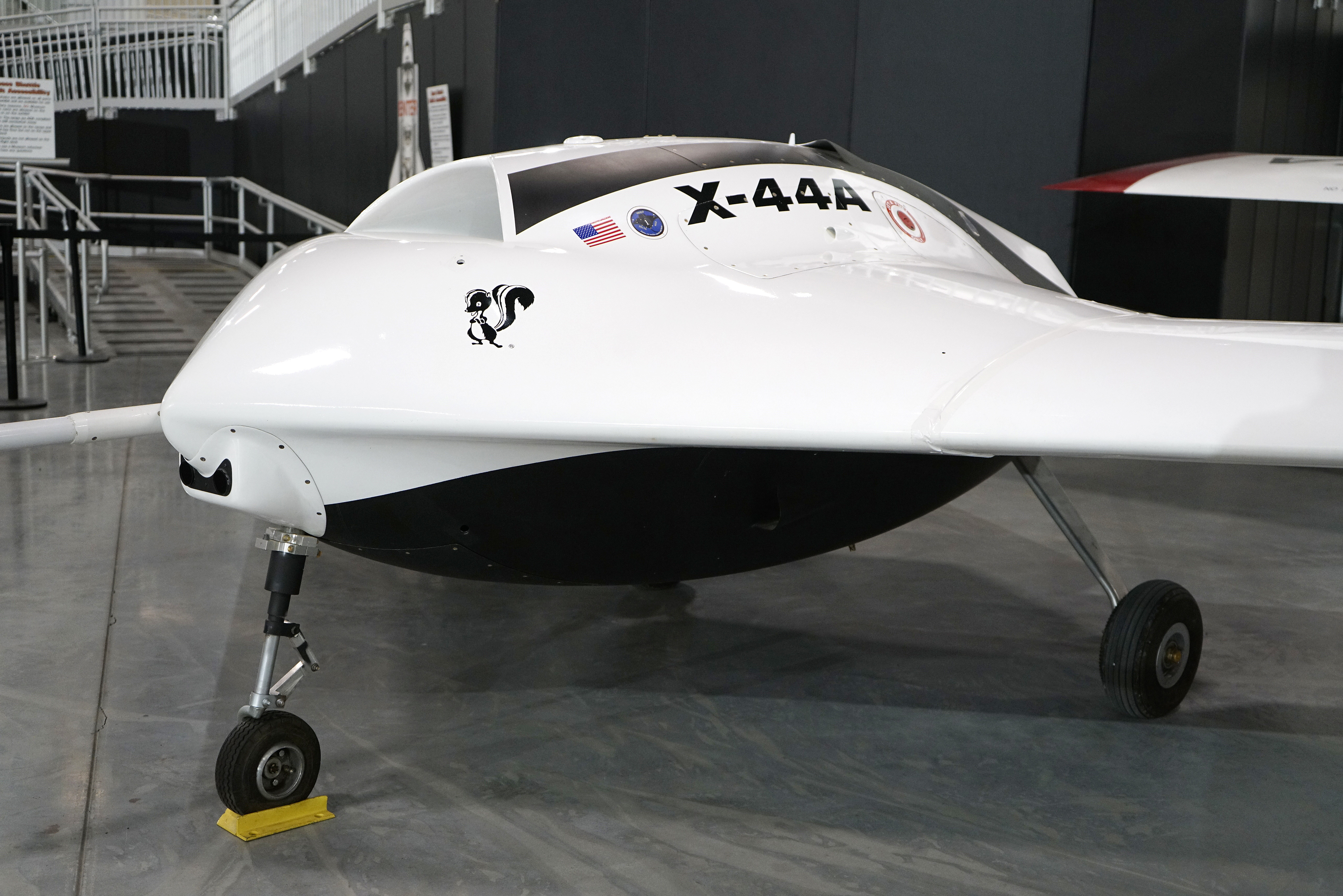

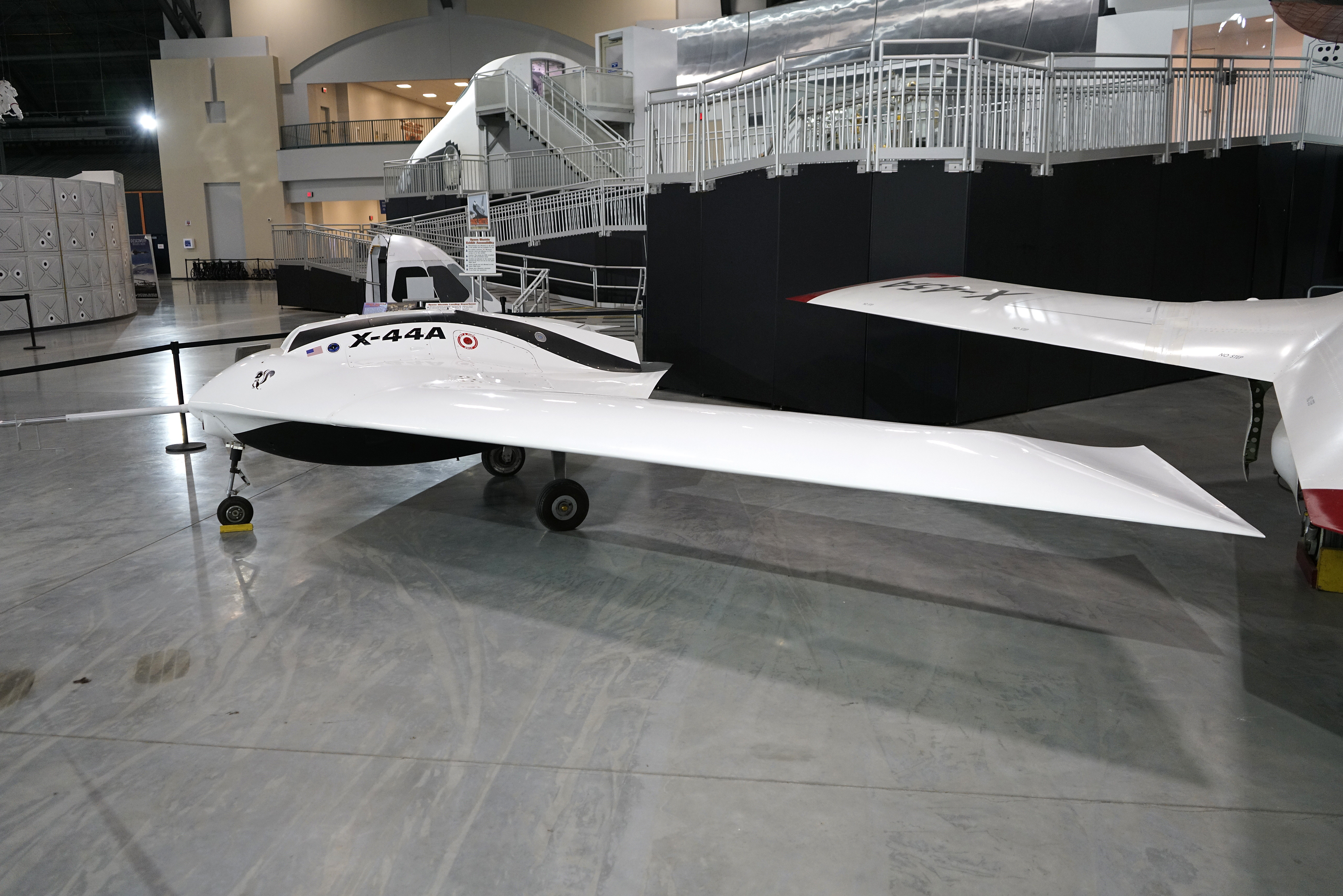

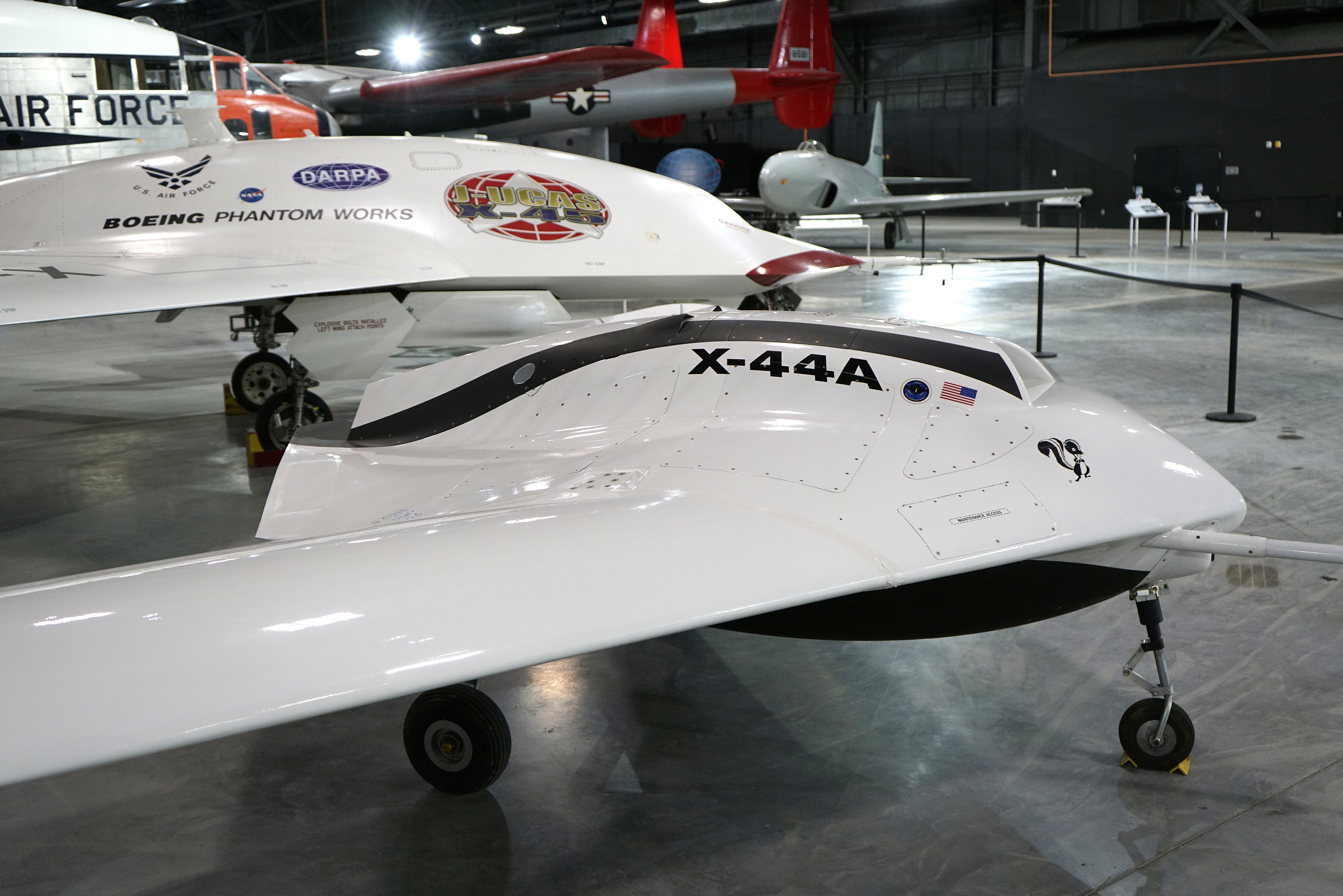

== See also ==
Aircraft of comparable role, configuration, and era

- Lockheed Martin RQ-170 Sentinel
- Lockheed Martin RQ-3 Dark Star
- Lockheed Martin Polecat

Related lists

- List of unmanned aerial vehicles
- List of military aircraft of the United States
