= Lockheed Have Blue =

Experimental stealth aircraft

Have Blue
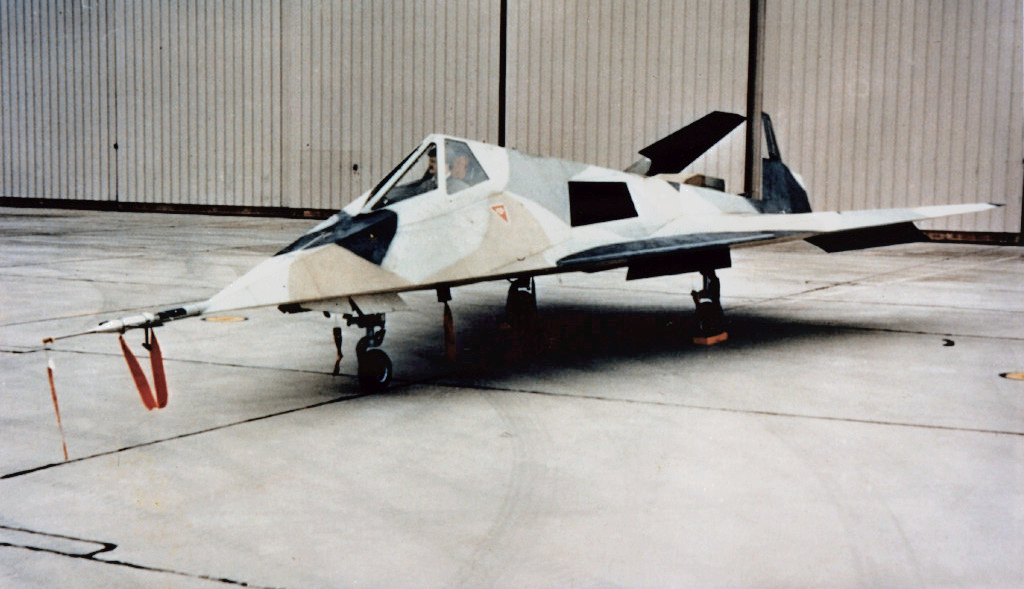
- Have Blue "HB1001" in camouflage paint scheme

General information
- Type: Stealth demonstrator
- Manufacturer: Lockheed Skunk Works
- Status: Destroyed
- Primary user: Lockheed
- Number built: 2

History
- First flight: 1 December 1977
- Developed into: Lockheed F-117 Nighthawk

Lockheed Have Blue was the code name for Lockheed's proof-of-concept demonstrator for a stealth fighter. Have Blue was designed by Lockheed's Skunk Works division and tested at Groom Lake, Nevada. The Have Blue was the first fixed-wing aircraft whose external shape was defined by radar engineering rather than by aerospace engineering. The aircraft's faceted shape was designed to deflect electromagnetic waves in directions other than that of the originating radar emitter, greatly reducing its radar cross-section.

The eventual design had faceted surfaces to deflect radar waves away from a radar receiver. It had highly swept wings and inward-canted vertical stabilizers, which led to its nickname "the Hopeless Diamond"—a pun on the Hope Diamond. The first operational aircraft made its maiden flight on 1 December 1977.

Two flyable vehicles were constructed. Both were lost due to mechanical problems. Nevertheless, Have Blue was deemed a success, paving the way for the first operational stealth aircraft, Senior Trend, or Lockheed F-117 Nighthawk.

== Background ==
In the 1970s, it became increasingly apparent to U.S. planners that, in a military confrontation with Warsaw Pact forces, NATO aircraft would quickly suffer heavy losses to sophisticated Soviet defense networks of surveillance radars, radar-guided surface-to-air missiles (SAM), and anti-aircraft artillery (AAA). Consequently, the Defense Advanced Research Projects Agency (DARPA) started a study on low-observability aircraft, seeking to design and produce an operational stealth aircraft. Five companies were invited, three of which bowed out early. The remaining two were later joined by Lockheed.

== Design and development ==
=== Origins ===
The Lockheed Have Blue was born out of a requirement to evade radar detection. During the Vietnam War, radar-guided SAMs and AAA downed many US aircraft, leading planners to accompany strike aircraft with support aircraft to perform combat air patrols and suppression of enemy air defenses (SEAD). The 1973 Yom Kippur War again highlighted the vulnerability of aircraft to SAMs; the Israeli Air Force lost 109 aircraft in 18 days. During the Cold War, the Soviet Union developed an integrated defense network around medium- to long-range surveillance radars. SAMs and AAAs would be set up around key locations to defend them from enemy aircraft. If the loss ratio of Israel during the Yom Kippur War was experienced by NATO forces during a military confrontation with the Warsaw Pact, NATO aircraft numbers would be depleted within two weeks.

In 1974, DARPA secretly asked five aircraft manufacturers about two considerations. The first was about the signature thresholds at which an aircraft is virtually undetectable. The second point was whether these companies could design and manufacture such an aircraft. Fairchild and Grumman declined to participate. General Dynamics insisted on the use of electronic countermeasures and consequently left the discussion. The remaining two companies, McDonnell Douglas and Northrop, were each awarded $100,000 for further research.

=== Design effort and early testing ===
Lockheed, having been absent from the fighter aircraft industry for 10 years, was not approached by DARPA in 1974. Ed Martin, Lockheed California Companies director of science and engineering, became aware of the research into stealth during his work at the Pentagon and Wright-Patterson AFB. Martin and Ben Rich, who at that time had recently become Skunk Works' president, briefed Clarence "Kelly" Johnson on the program. The Central Intelligence Agency (CIA) gave Skunk Works permission to discuss with DARPA the stealth characteristics of the A-12, M-21 and D-21. On behalf of the company, Rich and Martin formally requested permission from DARPA to participate in the program, but the agency initially refused because there were insufficient funds; after much debate, Lockheed was allowed entry, albeit without a government contract.

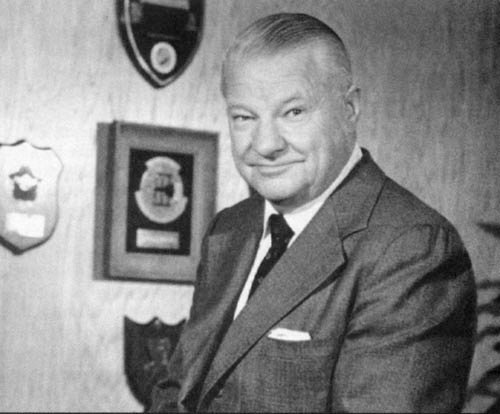
Kelly Johnson, Lockheed's designer, was initially skeptical of the Have Blue project

Preliminary designer Dick Scherrer requested possible shapes upon which he could base his low radar cross-section (RCS) design. He was introduced to Denys Overholser, who recommended an aircraft with flat surfaces. Overholser later recounted his discussion with Sherrer: "When Dick Scherrer asked me ... I said 'Well, it's simple, you just make it out of flat surfaces, and tilt those flat surfaces over, sweeping the edges away from the radar view angle, and that way you basically cause the energy to reflect away from the radar.'" Scherrer subsequently drew a preliminary low-RCS aircraft with faceted surfaces. At the same time, Overholser hired mathematician Bill Schroeder, who had trained Overholser on mathematics relating to stealth aircraft. Kenneth Watson was hired as the senior lead aircraft designer.

During the next few weeks, the team created a computer program that could evaluate the RCS of possible designs. The RCS-prediction software was called "ECHO 1". As tests with the program proceeded, it became apparent that edge calculations by the program were incorrect due to diffraction. To overcome this, Overholser incorporated elements of research by Soviet engineer Pyotr Ufimtsev into the software. (In 1962, Ufimtsev, as chief scientist of the Moscow Institute for Radio Engineering, published a seminal paper titled Method of Edge Waves in the Physical Theory of Diffraction. The work had been translated by the US Air Force Systems Command's Foreign Technology Division.) ECHO 1 allowed the team to quickly decide which of the 20 possible designs were optimal, finally settling on the faceted delta-wing design. However, many within the division were skeptical of the shape, giving rise to the name "Hopeless Diamond" – Kelly Johnson said to Rich, "Our old D-21 drone has a lower radar cross-section than that goddamn diamond".

In May 1975, the Skunk Works produced an internal report titled, "Progress Report No. 2, High Stealth Conceptual Studies." Within it was a concept study called "Little Harvey," including Kelly Johnson's drawing of an aircraft with smoothly blended shapes. Johnson advocated for the use of blended shapes as the best way to achieve stealth, while Ben Rich advocated for faceted angles. Rich won the argument with Johnson, a rare occurrence.

The design effort produced a number of wooden models. A 24-inch long model, made of balsa wood, demonstrated placement of internal structure and access doors. An Air & Space article noted "The model shop found it nearly impossible to make all the flat surfaces come to a single point in one corner. Engineers later encountered the same difficulty fabricating the prototype on the factory floor." For early tests of the design, two ⅓-scale wooden mock-ups were constructed. One model, coated in metal foil, was used to verify ECHO 1's RCS calculations, while the other was earmarked for wind tunnel tests. Afterwards, a model was moved to the Grey Butte Range radar-testing facility in the Mojave Desert near Palmdale, which allowed more accurate tests of the aircraft's RCS. In the event, the aircraft's RCS level confirmed ECHO 1's predictions. This meant Ben Rich won a quarter from Johnson, who previously insisted that the D-21 had less RCS than Have Blue.

=== Experimental Survivable Testbed ===
In the summer of 1975, DARPA informally invited Lockheed, Northrop and McDonnell Douglas to develop an aircraft under the name "Experimental Survivable Testbed" (XST). McDonnell Douglas, having identified the thresholds at which aircraft were deemed undetectable, was unable to design and produce such an aircraft. Phase 1 of XST would see both Lockheed and Northrop build full-scale models to test their RCS, construct flyable vehicles, and wind-tunnel test their designs. Following Phase 1, a sole contractor would be selected to continue with the construction and flight testing of two demonstrators as part of Phase 2. Northrop's and Lockheed's designs were generally similar, though the former's submission featured more angular and flat surfaces. The company used "GENSCAT", software similar to ECHO 1, to calculate the RCS of its designs.

On 1 November 1975, Lockheed and Northrop were each awarded $1.5-million contracts to proceed with Phase 1 of XST. During a four-month period, the two companies were each required to construct full-scale wooden mock-ups, which would then be evaluated at the USAF's Radar Target Scatter (RATSCAT) test facility at White Sands, New Mexico. To test the design's radar returns, Lockheed erected a $187,000 specially built pole upon which the model would be perched. In March 1976, a Lockheed model was transferred to the range before being tested; the following month Lockheed was pronounced the winner because the Northrop XST had a much higher side hemisphere RCS. DARPA, having realized the progress accumulated throughout the study, urged the Northrop team to remain together. The agency would later initiate the Battlefield Surveillance Aircraft-Experimental (BSAX), which evolved into the Tacit Blue and, ultimately, the B-2 bomber.

=== Construction and further tests ===
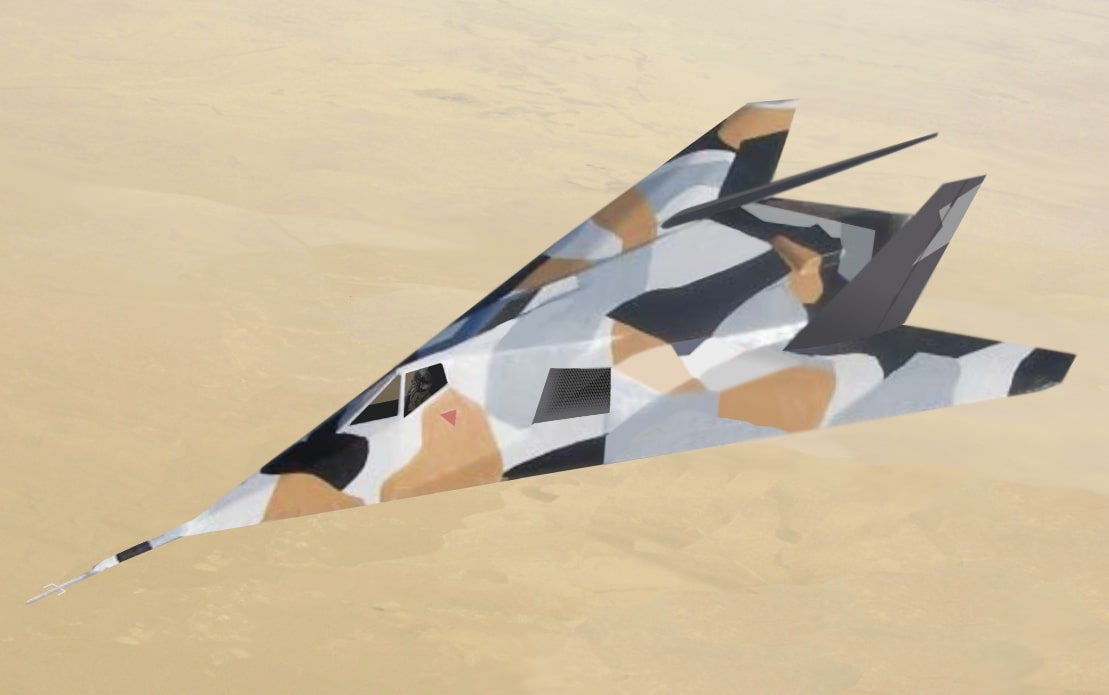
Lockheed Have Blue concept art

Skunk Works now had to design, construct and flight test two crewed demonstrators as part of Phase 2, or Have Blue. To build the demonstrators, Ben Rich had to raise $10.4 million from the Lockheed management, which was secured by June. Phase 2 encompassed three main objectives, which were the validation of: reduced visibility in the radio wave, infrared, and visual spectrums and reduced acoustical observability; acceptable flying qualities; and the "modeling capabilities that accurately predict low observable characteristics of an aircraft in flight".

Construction of both Have Blue demonstrators used leftover tools from the C-5 program. Final assembly of HB1001 was originally scheduled to be completed in August 1977, before being ground tested until mid-October. The secret roll-out was envisaged to occur on 23 October, after which the aircraft would be dismantled and transported to the test area. On 1 September, however, with HB1001 partially complete, Lockheed machinists went on a four-month strike. A group of managers took over the job of assembly, which was completed in six weeks, with ground tests beginning on 17 October.

While superficially similar to the later F-117, the Have Blue prototypes were smaller aircraft, about one quarter the weight of the F-117, with a wing sweep of 72.5° and inward-canted vertical tails (inverse V-tail). Radar-absorbent material (RAM), developed in a Lockheed laboratory, was applied to the aircraft's flat surfaces – for the windscreen, special coatings were applied to give them metallic characteristics. The aircraft's gross weight of 9,200–12,500 lb (4,200–5,700 kg) enabled the aircraft to use the landing gear from the Northrop F-5 fighter. The aircraft's powerplants were two 2,950-pound (13.1 kN) General Electric J85-GE-4As from the T-2C Buckeye. Because stealth took precedence above all else, the aircraft was inherently unstable. As a result, a quadruple redundant fly-by-wire (FBW) flight control system was integrated into the aircraft to give it normal flying characteristics. The flight control system was borrowed from the F-16. The overwing engine inlet was covered by a low-RCS grid; blow-in doors were constructed at the upper fuselage to admit additional airflow during takeoffs, when more air is needed.

Throughout the one and a half months after the start of ground tests, HB1001, the first of two demonstrators, underwent tests in preparations for the first flight. Flight instrumentation was checked first, followed by a thorough shakedown of the aircraft. In early November, two semi-trailers were parked parallel to each other outside Building 82; a camouflage net was thrown over the top to cover the demonstrator during outdoor engine runs. During the engine tests, a local resident complained about the noise, but Have Blue retained its secrecy. HB1001 received a layer of iron-coat paint; during the weekend of 12–13 November, the aircraft received a camouflage scheme devised by Alan Brown, Have Blue's chief technical engineer. The scheme, consisting of three colors, each with three tones, was used to deceive any casual onlooker from recognizing the design's characteristic faceting. The aircraft was disassembled, loaded onto a C-5, and on 16 November, the aircraft was flown from Burbank Airport (since renamed Bob Hope Airport) to Area 51 at Groom Lake, Nevada. Upon touchdown, the aircraft was reassembled before undergoing another round of testing prior to the first flight. After four taxi tests, HB1001 was ready for test flights.

== Operational history ==
=== HB1001 ===
HB1001 made its first flight on 1 December 1977 at the hands of Lockheed test pilot, Bill Park. He would fly the next four sorties, all chased by a T-38 piloted by Major (later Lieutenant Colonel) Ken Dyson. Dyson, an F-15 Eagle pilot, was previously approached by United States Air Force personnel about the project in 1976. He made his first flight on HB1001 on 17 January 1978, chased by Park. In fact, the two would be the only test pilots of Have Blue, alternating between the demonstrator and the chase plane. Flight test results allowed engineers to refine the FBW system. At the same time, they verified predictions made earlier by aerodynamic engineers on the aircraft's behavior.

Flight tests proceeded fairly smoothly until 4 May 1978, when HB1001 was making its 36th flight. The aircraft pitched up just as it made contact with the ground which forced the pilot, Bill Park, to abort the landing and make a second attempt. The impact had however been so hard that the landing gear had become jammed in a semi-retracted position. Efforts to lower the gear were unsuccessful and Bill Park was forced to climb again, and eject when his fuel ran out. The aircraft was destroyed on impact in the vicinity of the Groom Lake facility. Park survived, but suffered a concussion, forcing him to retire from further test flights. Dyson, who was in the chase plane, recounted: "Just before touchdown the airplane pitched up... It seemed it slammed down on the ground real hard... He [Park] raised the gear on the go around, and when he tried to extend it on approach, only one of the mains and the nose wheel came down. All this time, gas was being consumed... I suggested he climb up to 10,000 feet for ejection... He started climbing, but the engine started flaming out, from the lack of fuel, so he ejected."

=== HB1002 ===
At the time of the crash, HB1002 was almost complete, with the lessons learned from the HB1001 incorporated into the aircraft, including the rebuilding of the aft fuselage. HB1002 was distinguished from the prototype in having a gray paint coat. It did not have the flight test instrumentation boom present on HB1001's nose. As the aircraft was used to test RCS returns, the unstealthy spin recovery chute was removed, and the aircraft was covered in radar-absorbent material. It first flew on 20 July 1978 with Dyson at the controls, who would be the only pilot to fly the aircraft.

HB1002 was lost on 11 July 1979 during the aircraft's 52nd flight. A hydraulic leak caused an engine fire, resulting in the loss of hydraulic pressure, which in turn caused severe pitch oscillations. The pilot ejected safely, and the aircraft was destroyed. It was later discovered that an engine exhaust clamp had loosened, allowing the hot exhaust to migrate to the right engine compartment. The heat built up there, causing the hydraulic lines to fail. The debris from both aircraft was secretly buried somewhere within the Nellis Air Force Base Complex. Despite the crashes, Have Blue was considered a success.

=== Senior Trend ===
In October 1977, just prior to Phase 2 of the XST competition, Lockheed was tasked with exploring possible operational aircraft. Just a month later, on the day HB1001 was transported to Groom Lake, the Air Force awarded the company a contract under the code name Senior Trend. (Note: Quote: "The results of these studies were sufficiently promising that the Air Force issued a development contract on 16 November 1977 under the name Senior Trend.") The Air Force wanted to exploit the revolutionary technologies developed during the Have Blue program. Tactical Air Command ordered five full-scale development and twenty production aircraft.

Based on the Have Blue demonstrators, Senior Trend aircraft were different from their predecessors in several aspects. The wings exhibited less sweep to resolve a center-of-gravity problem discovered during tests. The front fuselage was shortened to give the pilot a better view, and the vertical stabilizers were canted outwards from the centerline. Additionally, provisions were made to include two weapons bays, each of which would accommodate a single 2,000-pound (910 kg) laser-guided bomb, or the B61 tactical nuclear bomb.

Beset by early construction problems, the first FSD aircraft was transferred to Groom Lake in May 1981 inside a C-5. Further problems, this time with fuel leaks, delayed the first flight. Under the control of Harold Farley, the aircraft took off on 18 June for its maiden flight, eleven months after the July 1980 first flight originally envisaged. The first production F-117A was delivered in 1982, and operational capability was achieved in October 1983; the 59th and last F-117A was delivered in 1990.

== Specifications ==
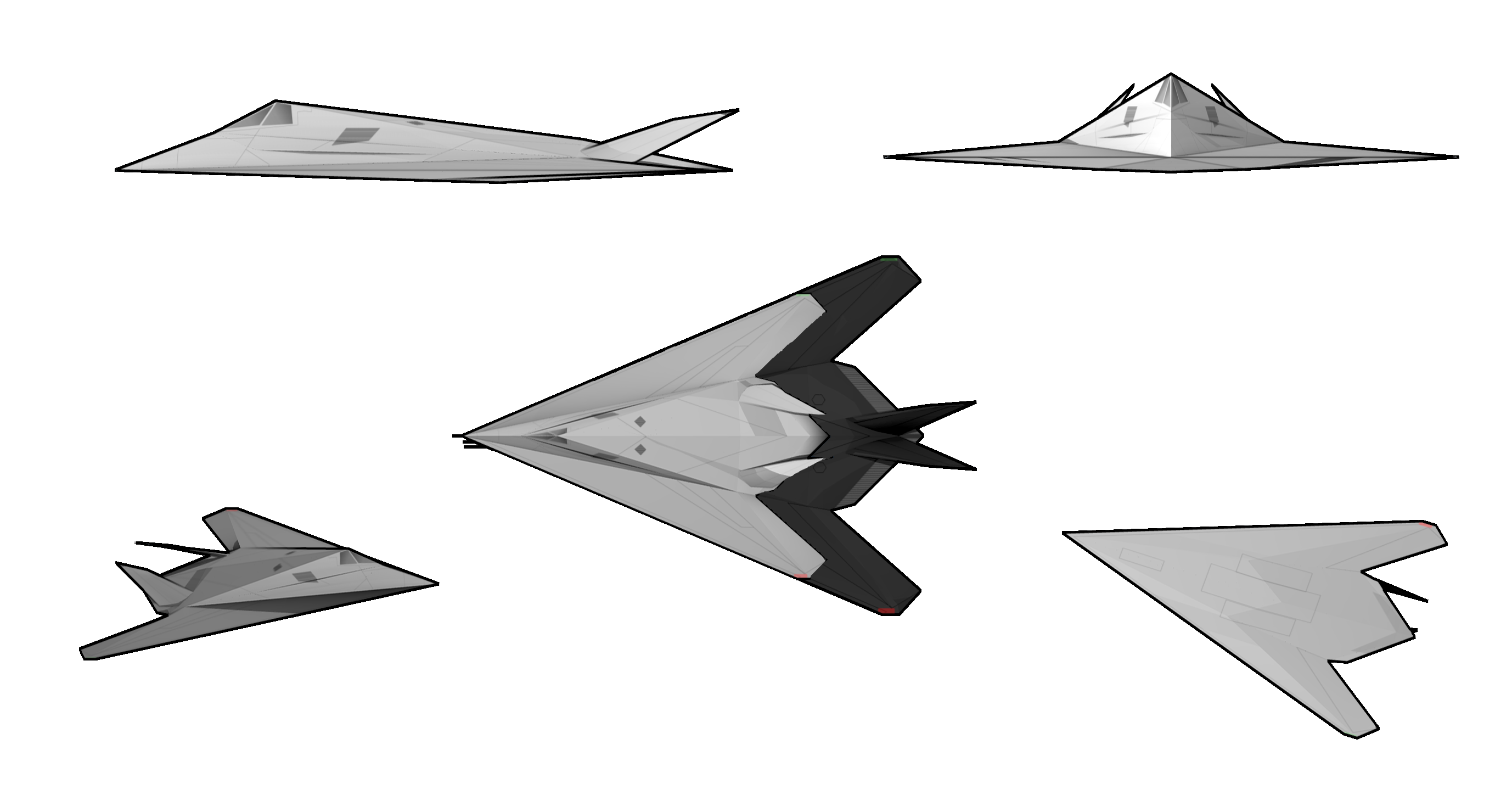
Several CG rendered views of Have Blue, with overhead comparison of its smaller size relative to the F-117

Data from Crickmore, Donald, Aronstein and Piccirillo

General characteristics

- Crew: 1
- Length: 47 ft 3 in (14.40 m)
- Wingspan: 22 ft 6 in (6.86 m)
- Height: 7 ft 6 in (2.29 m)
- Wing area: 386 sq ft (35.9 m^{2})
- Empty weight: 8,950 lb (4,060 kg)
- Max takeoff weight: 12,500 lb (5,670 kg)
- Powerplant: 2 × General Electric J85-GE-4A turbojet engines, 2,950 lbf (13.1 kN) thrust each

Performance

- Maximum speed: 521 kn (600 mph, 965 km/h)
- Wing loading: 32 lb/sq ft (160 kg/m^{2})
- Thrust/weight: 0.46–0.62

== See also ==
Related development

- Lockheed F-117 Nighthawk
- Lockheed Senior Prom (a stealthy cruise missile prototype, based on Have Blue, also flown at Groom Lake)

Aircraft of comparable role, configuration, and era

- Northrop Tacit Blue
- MBB Lampyridae

Related lists

- List of experimental aircraft
- List of Lockheed aircraft
