= Lockheed Senior Prom =

Classified stealth cruise missile program conducted by the USAF in the late 70s/early 80s

Senior Prom

General information
- Type: Experimental stealth cruise missile
- National origin: United States
- Manufacturer: Lockheed Corporation
- Primary user: United States Air Force
- Number built: 6

History
- First flight: October 1978
- Retired: 1982
- Developed from: Lockheed Have Blue

The Lockheed Senior Prom was a classified black project conducted by the United States Air Force in conjunction with the Lockheed Corporation's Skunk Works for the development and testing of a cruise missile using stealth technology. Based on the company's Have Blue demonstrator, the six Senior Prom vehicles proved successful in testing conducted at Area 51 in the late 1970s; despite this, the aircraft was not selected to enter production, and the program was terminated in the early 1980s.

== Design and development ==
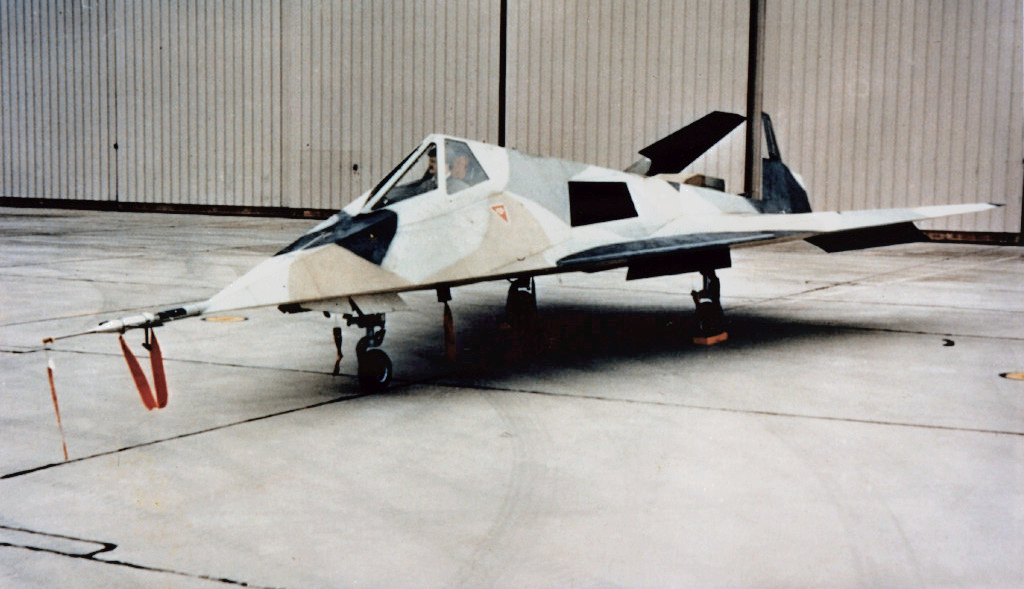
The airframe of the Senior Prom vehicle was based on that of the Have Blue technology demonstrator, illustrated here.

Following the success of the test program for the Lockheed Have Blue stealth technology demonstrator aircraft, the United States Air Force awarded a contract to the Lockheed Advanced Development Projects division—the "Skunk Works"—for the development of an unmanned aerial vehicle, intended to act as the prototype of a cruise missile, that would apply the Have Blue's faceted design in order to reduce the radar cross section of the missile by deflecting electromagnetic waves from radar transmitters away from their source, instead of directly back at the radar set's antenna.

The program began in 1977, with a reported budget of US$24,000,000; the design of the aircraft was closely based on that of Have Blue, except scaled down. Intended for launch from Lockheed DC-130 Hercules drone launcher aircraft, the original configuration of the Senior Prom vehicle included winglets and a ventral fin; the aircraft was later modified to include a V-tail and more slender wings, closer in configuration to the F-117 Nighthawk stealth fighter. Radar-absorbent material was applied to the airframe as part of its stealth configuration; in addition to the faceting of the design, similar to that of Have Blue and the F-117, the "sawtooth" wing profile bore similarities to the B-2 stealth bomber's planform.

The Senior Prom vehicle was intended to be expendable; however, it was modified to be reusable before testing commenced, with a ballistic parachute and inflatable landing bag located under the fuselage. The aircraft is believed to have been fitted with folding wings to facilitate carriage by the launching aircraft, and was powered by a single turbofan engine, with the air intake and exhaust being configured in such a manner that the airframe would shield them from the ground, reducing the aircraft's radar and infrared signatures.

== Testing and cancellation ==
Flight testing of the Senior Prom vehicles began in October 1978; a total of six aircraft were built, which completed a total of fourteen flights over the duration of the testing program. The craft were reportedly capable of flying within 500 feet (150 m) of a SPS-13 radar without generating a discernible return. Most testing took place at Groom Lake ("Area 51") in Nevada, with a DC-130 Hercules acting as the launch aircraft; there are also reports that some testing was conducted at Edwards Air Force Base in California, with a B-52 Stratofortress being used as the launch platform, while "Hangar 18" at the Groom Lake test complex was reportedly constructed to house the B-52 and Senior Prom combination.

Despite the success of the test program, Senior Prom was cancelled in 1982; reportedly one reason for the cancellation of the project was that the size and configuration of the Senior Prom aircraft rendered it incapable of being carried in internal weapons bays such as that on the B-1 bomber; the AGM-129 ACM, a competing design to Senior Prom for the cruise missile requirement, had a more slender airframe with retractable wings, which rendered it capable of internal carriage; it began flight testing shortly after the end of the Senior Prom program.

Despite the cancellation of the program in 1982, Senior Prom remains highly classified into the 21st century.
