= Lockheed Martin Polecat =

Type of unmanned aircraft

Polecat
- A picture of the Lockheed-Martin Polecat released at the Farnborough Airshow in 2006

General information
- Type: Unmanned aerial vehicle
- Manufacturer: Lockheed Martin Skunk Works
- Number built: 1

History
- First flight: 2005
- Retired: December 18, 2006
- Developed from: Lockheed Martin X-44 (UAV)
- Developed into: Lockheed Martin RQ-170 Sentinel

The Lockheed Martin Polecat (company designation P-175) was an unmanned aerial vehicle by Lockheed Martin. It was developed by the company's Advanced Development Programs division in Palmdale, California.

== Design and development ==
Designated P-175, the Polecat was funded internally by Lockheed Martin (as opposed to using United States Government funds) at the beginning of 2005. The prototype was unveiled at the 2006 Farnborough Airshow. It was developed over a period of 18 months.

On December 18, 2006, the aircraft crashed due to an "irreversible unintentional failure in the flight termination ground equipment, which caused the aircraft's automatic fail-safe flight termination mode to activate."

== Specifications ==
General characteristics

- Crew: 0
- Capacity: 1,000 lb (450 kg) of weapons or sensors
- Wingspan: 90 ft 0 in (27.44 m)
- Gross weight: 9,000 lb (4,082 kg)
- Powerplant: 2 × Williams FJ44-3E turbofan engines, 3,010 lbf (13.38 kN) thrust each

Performance

- Endurance: 4 hours
- Service ceiling: 65,000 ft (20,000 m)
