= National Radar Cross-section Facility =

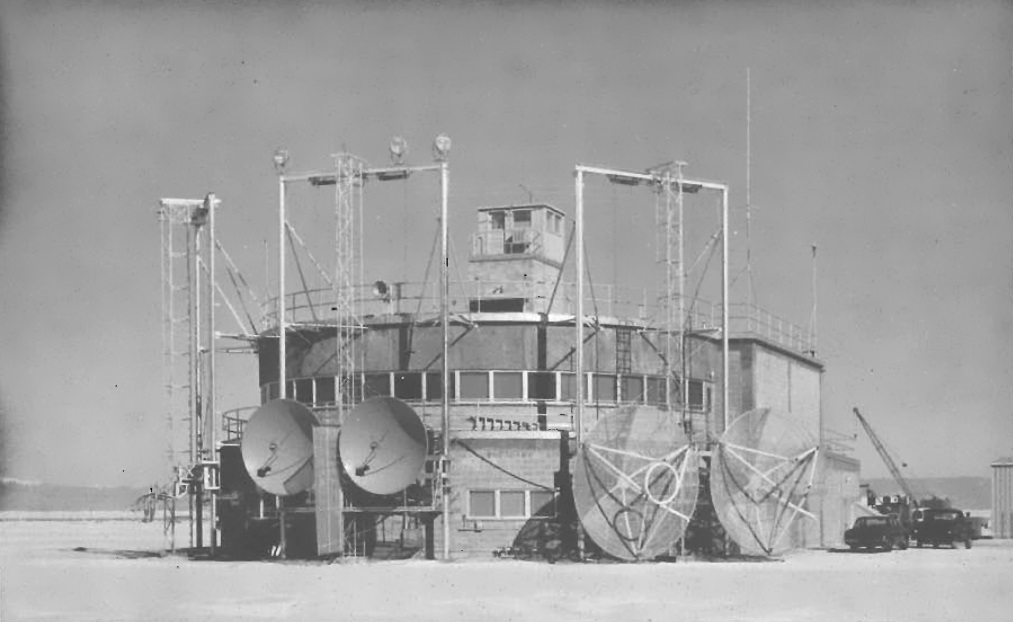
RATSCAT facility operations building

The United States' National Radar Cross-section Facility (commonly abbreviated as RATSCAT) is located at Holloman AFB, New Mexico. The Lockheed Have Blue and Lockheed F-117 Nighthawk have been tested at this site.
