= AGM-129 ACM =

AGM-129 Advanced Cruise Missile
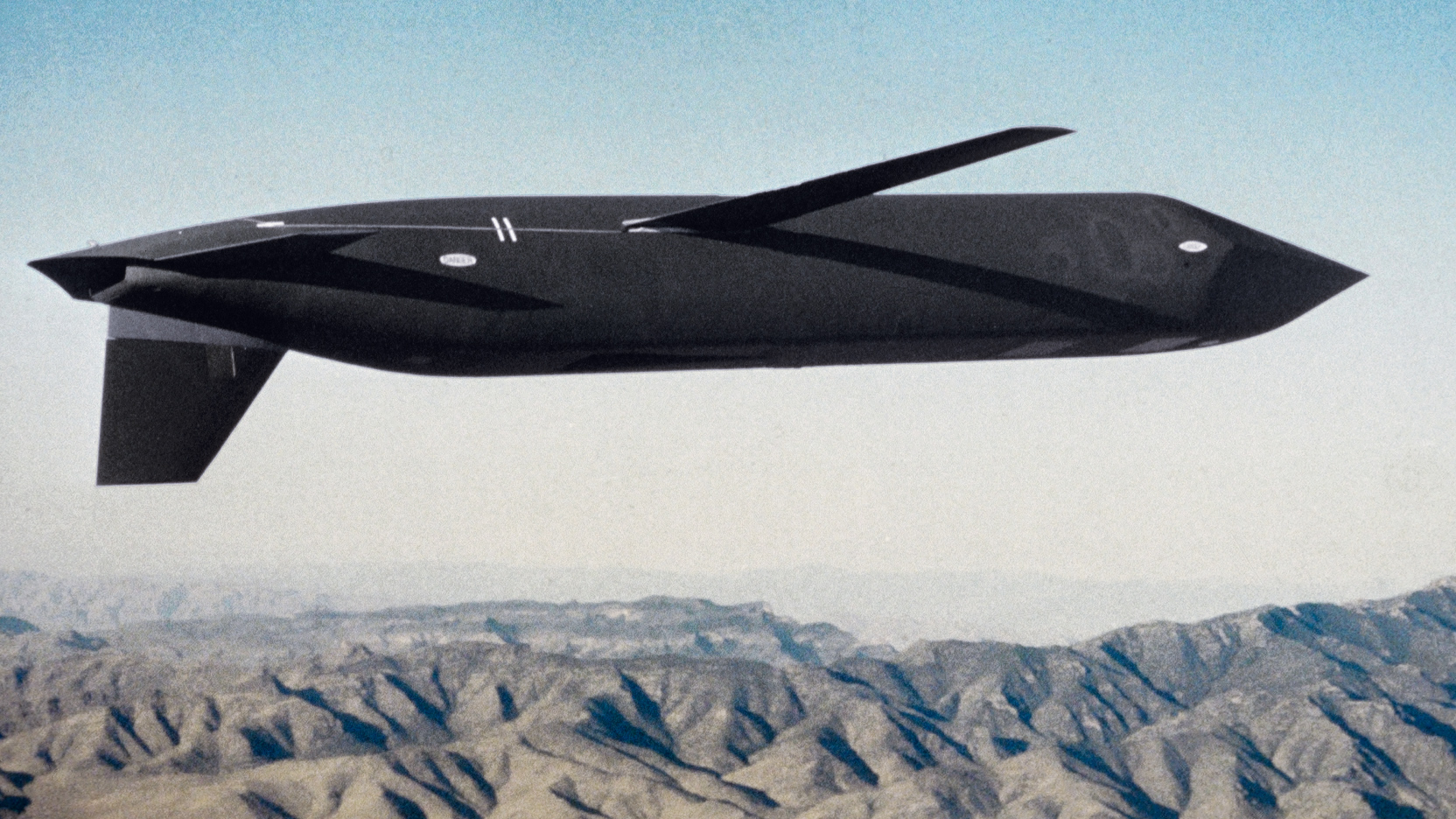
- Type: Air-launched cruise missile
- Place of origin: United States

Service history
- In service: June 1990 – April 2012
- Used by: U.S. Air Force (decommissioned)

Production history
- Manufacturer: General Dynamics (initially); Raytheon
- Produced: July 1985

Specifications
- Mass: more than 3,700 lb (1,680 kg)
- Length: 20 ft 10 in (6.35 m)
- Diameter: 2 ft 5 in (705 mm)
- Wingspan: 10 ft 2 in (3.1 m)
- Warhead: W80-1 nuclear warhead
- Engine: Williams International F112-WR-100 turbofan 2.67–3.25 kN (600–730 lbf)
- Operational range: 1,865–2,000 nautical miles (3,450–3,700 km)
- Maximum speed: 500 mph (800 km/h)
- Guidance system: Inertial guidance system enhanced with Lidar and Terrain Contour Matching (TERCOM).
- Launch platform: B-52 Stratofortress

The AGM-129 ACM (Advanced Cruise Missile) was a low-observable, subsonic, turbofan-powered, air-launched cruise missile originally designed and built by General Dynamics and eventually acquired by Raytheon Missile Systems. Prior to its withdrawal from service in 2012, the AGM-129A was carried exclusively by the US Air Force's B-52H Stratofortress bombers.

== Early development ==
In 1982, the US Air Force began studies for a new cruise missile with low-observable characteristics after it became clear that the AGM-86B cruise missile would have difficulty penetrating future air defense systems. The AGM-86B relied on low-altitude flight to penetrate the Soviet air defense system centered on surface to air missiles. The deployment of the airborne early warning systems, together with the Zaslon PESA radar on MiG-31 and Myech radar on Su-27 interceptors, all three "look-down/shoot-down" radars, reduced the likelihood that the low-altitude AGM-86B would reach its target.

The solution was to incorporate various "low-observable" ('stealth') technologies into a new Advanced Cruise Missile system.

== Design, test and initial production ==
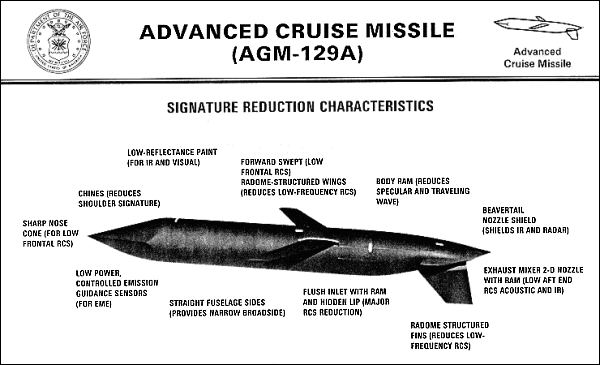
AGM-129A signature reduction characteristics

In 1983, General Dynamics Convair Division (GD/C) was awarded a development contract for the AGM-129A (the losing design was Lockheed Corporation's Senior Prom). The AGM-129A incorporated body shaping to reduce the missile's radar cross section. The engine air intake was flush mounted on the bottom of the missile to further improve radar cross section. The jet engine exhaust was shielded by the tail and cooled by a diffuser to reduce the infrared signature of the missile. To reduce electronic emissions from the missile, the radar used in the AGM-86B was replaced with a combination of inertial navigation and terrain contour matching (TERCOM) enhanced with highly accurate speed updates provided by a Lidar Doppler velocimeter.

These changes made the AGM-129A more difficult to detect and allowed the missile to be flown at higher altitude. The newer Williams International F112-WR-100 turbofan engine increased range by about 50%. The newer guidance system increased accuracy to a quoted figure of between 100 and 300 ft (30 and 90 m).

The AGM-129A, like the AGM-86B, is armed with a W80-1 variable-yield nuclear warhead.

The first test missile flew in July 1985, and the first production missiles were delivered to the US Air Force in 1987. The development program experienced some hardware 'quality control' problems and testing mishaps. The flight test program took place during a period of high tension between the machinists' union and GDC management, with a 3 1/2-week-long strike occurring in 1987. US Congressman Les Aspin called the ACM a procurement disaster with the worst problems of any of the eight strategic weapons programs his committee had reviewed. The US Congress zeroed out funding for the ACM program in 1989. Manufacturing quality problems led the US Air Force to stop missile deliveries in 1989 and 1991. McDonnell Douglas was invited to qualify as a second source for missile production. In early 1989, the United States requested and received permission to test the AGM-129A in Canada.

Plans called for producing enough missiles to replace the approximately 1,461 AGM-86B's at a rate of 200 missiles per year after full-rate production was achieved in 1993. In January 1992, the end of the Cold War led US President George H. W. Bush to announce a major cutback in total ACM procurement. The President determined that only 640 missiles were needed. The ACM program was later reduced still further to 460 missiles. In August 1992, General Dynamics sold its missile business to Hughes Aircraft Corporation. Five years later in 1997, Hughes Aircraft Corporation sold its aerospace and defense business to the final production contractor Raytheon.

The US Air Force pushed for production of a AGM-129B variant for targets for which the AGM-129A was considered ineffective. The US Air Force submitted this requirement in 1985 and proposed to modify 120 missiles into the AGM-129B variant. In 1991, the US Congress denied the request and the US Air Force was forced to terminate the program. In 1992, the US Air Force was directed by the US Department of Defense to restart the program, an effort which was opposed by the General Accounting Office of the US Congress. Confusion exists as to precisely how this weapon is different from the original. The Department of Defense document DoD 4120.15-L "Model Designation of Military Aerospace Vehicles" states that the AGM-129B was an AGM-129A "modified with structural and software changes and an alternate nuclear warhead for accomplishing a classified cruise missile mission." However, Ozu states the AGM-129B was intended to be a non-nuclear version of the ACM, much as the nuclear AGM-86B led to the conventional AGM-86C. This role was instead filled by the AGM-158 JASSM.

== Operational history ==
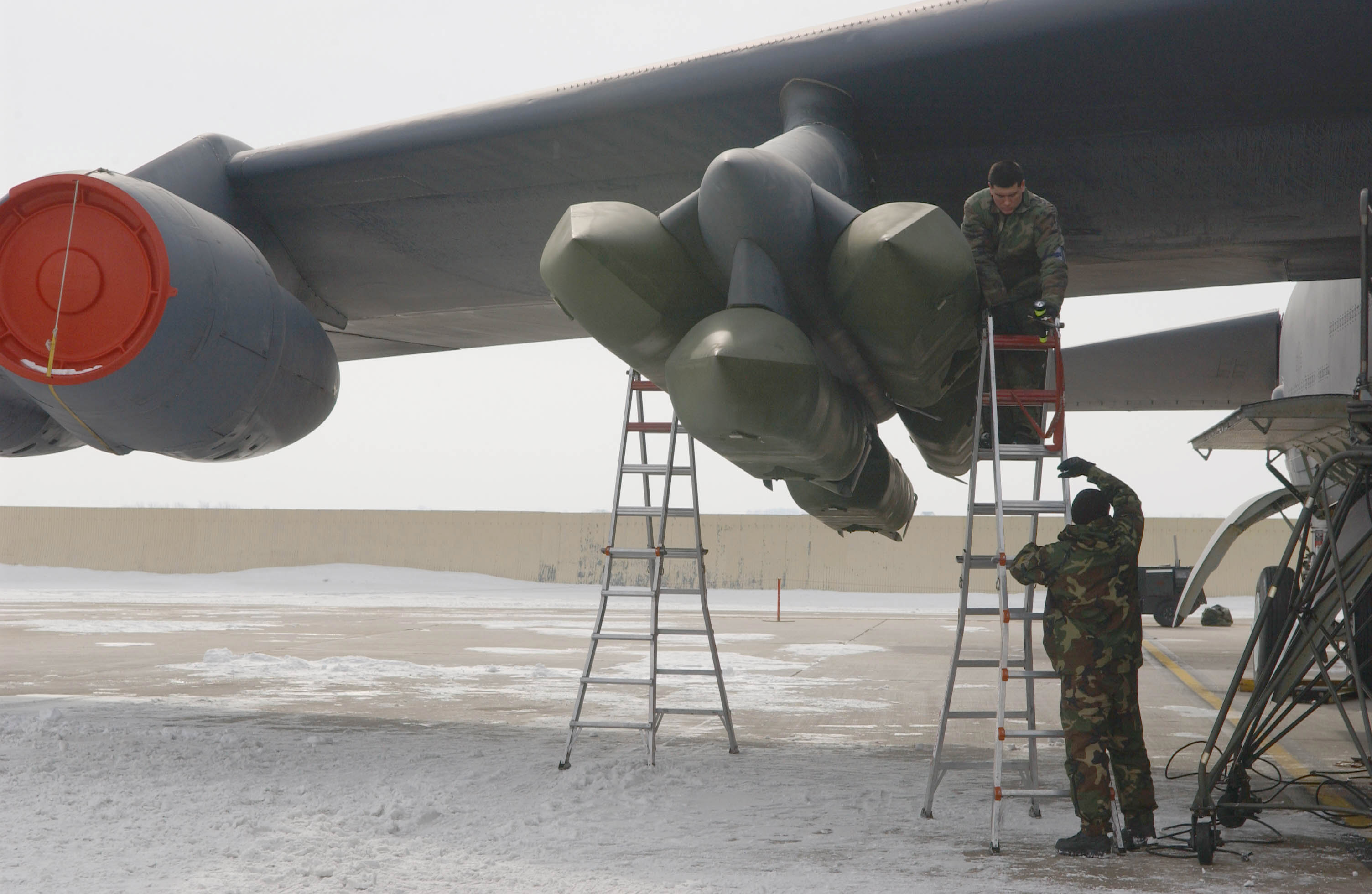
AGM-129A cruise missiles being secured on a B-52H bomber

The B-52H bomber can carry up to 6 AGM-129A missiles on each of two external pylons for a total of 12 per aircraft. Originally, an additional 8 ACMs could be carried internally in the B-52 on Common Strategic Rotary Launchers, for a total of 20 per aircraft. The B-1B bomber was also slated to carry the AGM-129A, but that plan was ended after the cessation of the Cold War. The AGM-129A provides the B-52H bomber the ability to attack multiple targets without penetrating an air defense system.

An AGM-129A impacted and damaged two unoccupied trailers, part of a cosmic ray observatory operated by the University of Utah and Tokyo University, located in the "hazardous operations" area of the United States Army Dugway Proving Ground on December 10, 1997. The AGM-129A was released over the Utah Test and Training Range from a B-52H bomber assigned to Minot Air Force Base, North Dakota. The missile had flown for approximately 3.5 hours on its planned route and had fulfilled all test objectives prior to the mishap. The missile was carrying an inert test payload. Mission planners were unaware of the existence of the trailers.

The Air Force in 2008 maintained an arsenal of 1,140 AGM-86 ALCMs and 460 AGM-129 ACMs. The B-52 is the only platform for these missiles. The reductions also include all but 528 nuclear-armed ALCMs and are in part a result of the SORT/Moscow Treaty (2002) requirement to get below 2,200 deployed nuclear weapons by 2012, with the ACM chosen for disposal because it has reliability issues and higher maintenance costs. In March 2007, despite a Service Life Extension program (SLEP) intended to extend its operational usefulness to 2030, the USAF made the final decision to decommission its entire inventory of AGM-129s with the last missile being destroyed in April 2012.

=== Handling incident ===
On August 30, 2007, twelve ACMs loaded on a B-52 were flown across the US from Minot Air Force Base, North Dakota to Barksdale Air Force Base, Louisiana for decommissioning. The nuclear warheads which should have been removed before the flight were mistakenly left installed on six of the ACMs. For 36 hours the nuclear weapons were unaccounted for, which led to an official investigation of the incident.

== Variants ==
- AGM-129A – 461 missiles produced.
- AGM-129B – Designation was assigned in 1988 for a modified missile with structural and software changes and fitted with a different nuclear warhead.
- AGM-129C – Conventional Warhead Variants

== Operators ==
=== Former operators ===
United States

== Surviving munitions ==
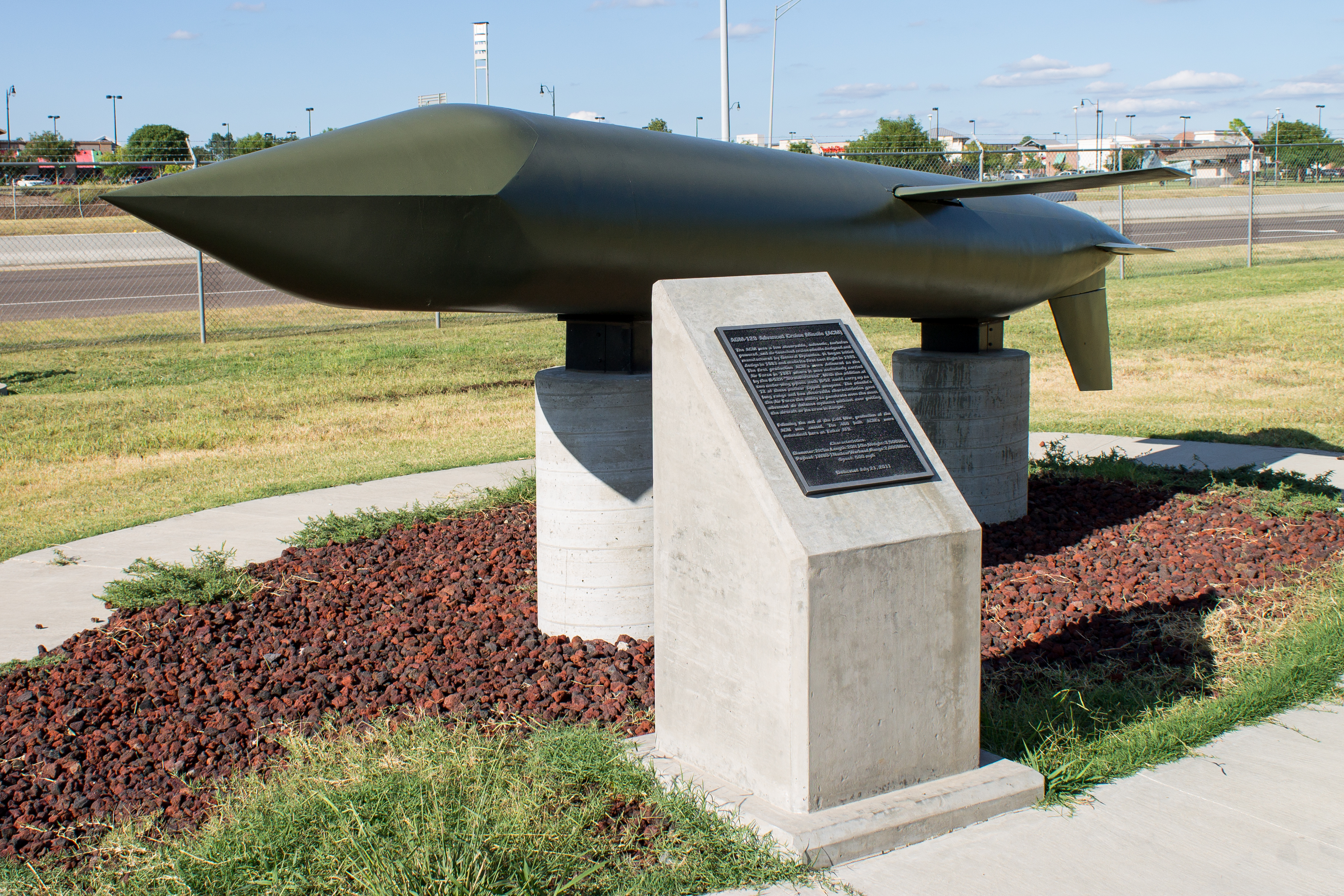
An AGM-129 on display at Tinker AFB, Oklahoma

- AGM-129A located in the National Museum of the United States Air Force, Wright-Patterson Air Force Base, Dayton, Ohio
- AGM-129A located in the Strategic Air and Space Museum, Ashland, Nebraska
- AGM-129A located at Tinker AFB, Oklahoma (N35 26’ 1.93” W97 24’ 10.58”)

== See also ==
- Missile of the same class
  - Storm Shadow – (France, United Kingdom)
  - Taurus KEPD 350 – (Sweden, Germany)
- Modern nuclear stealth cruise missile fulfilling the same role
  - AGM-181 LRSO – (United States)
