= McDonnell Douglas X-36 =

Prototype jet

X-36
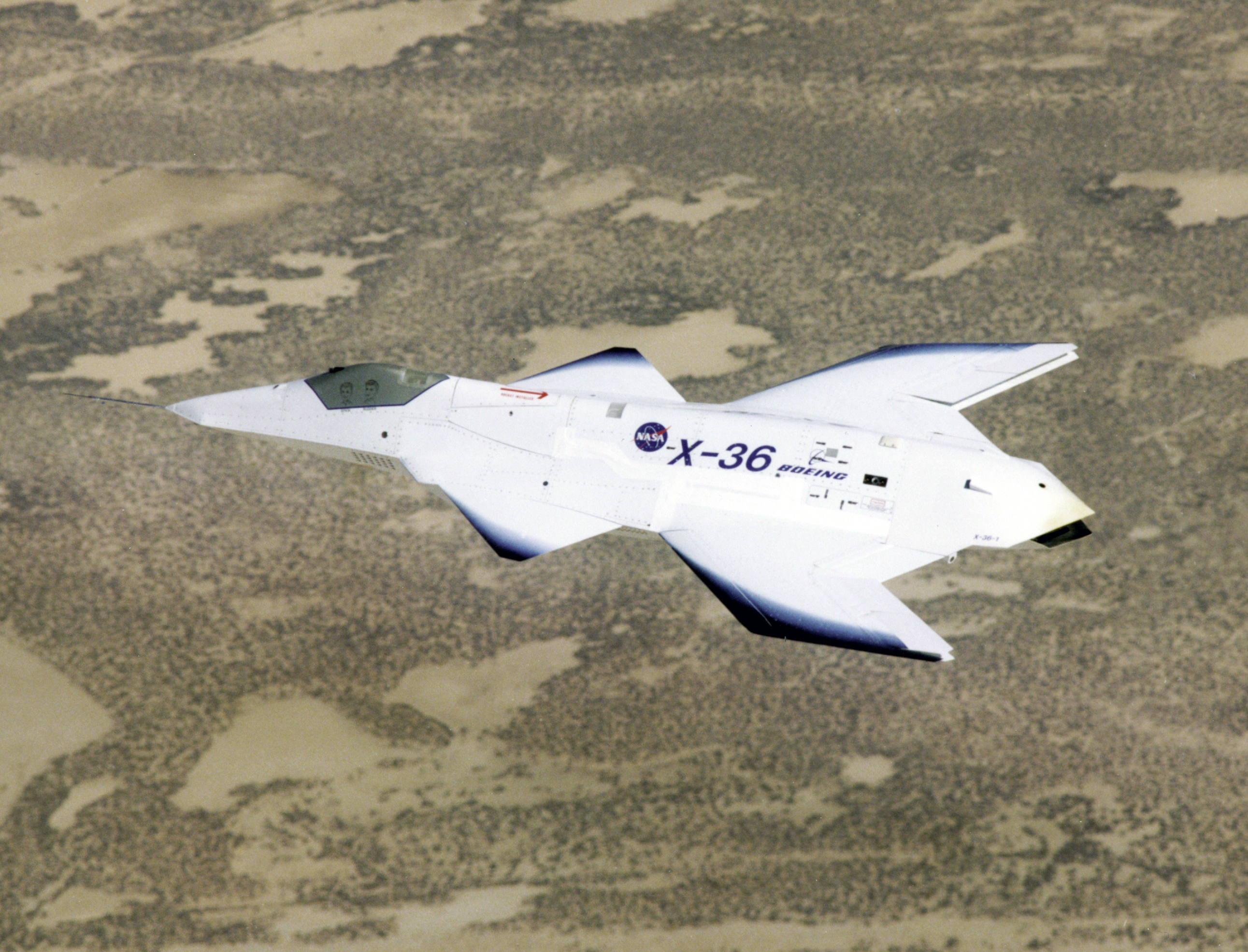
- X-36 in flight

General information
- Type: Unmanned aerial vehicle
- Manufacturer: McDonnell Douglas/Boeing
- Status: Retired
- Number built: 2

History
- First flight: 17 May 1997

The Boeing X-36 (historically McDonnell Douglas X-36) Tailless Fighter Agility Research Aircraft is an American stealthy subscale prototype jet UAV. Built for NASA and first flown in 1997, it was designed without the traditional empennage found on most aircraft. This configuration was designed to reduce weight, drag, and radar cross section; and increase range, maneuverability, and survivability.

== Design and development ==
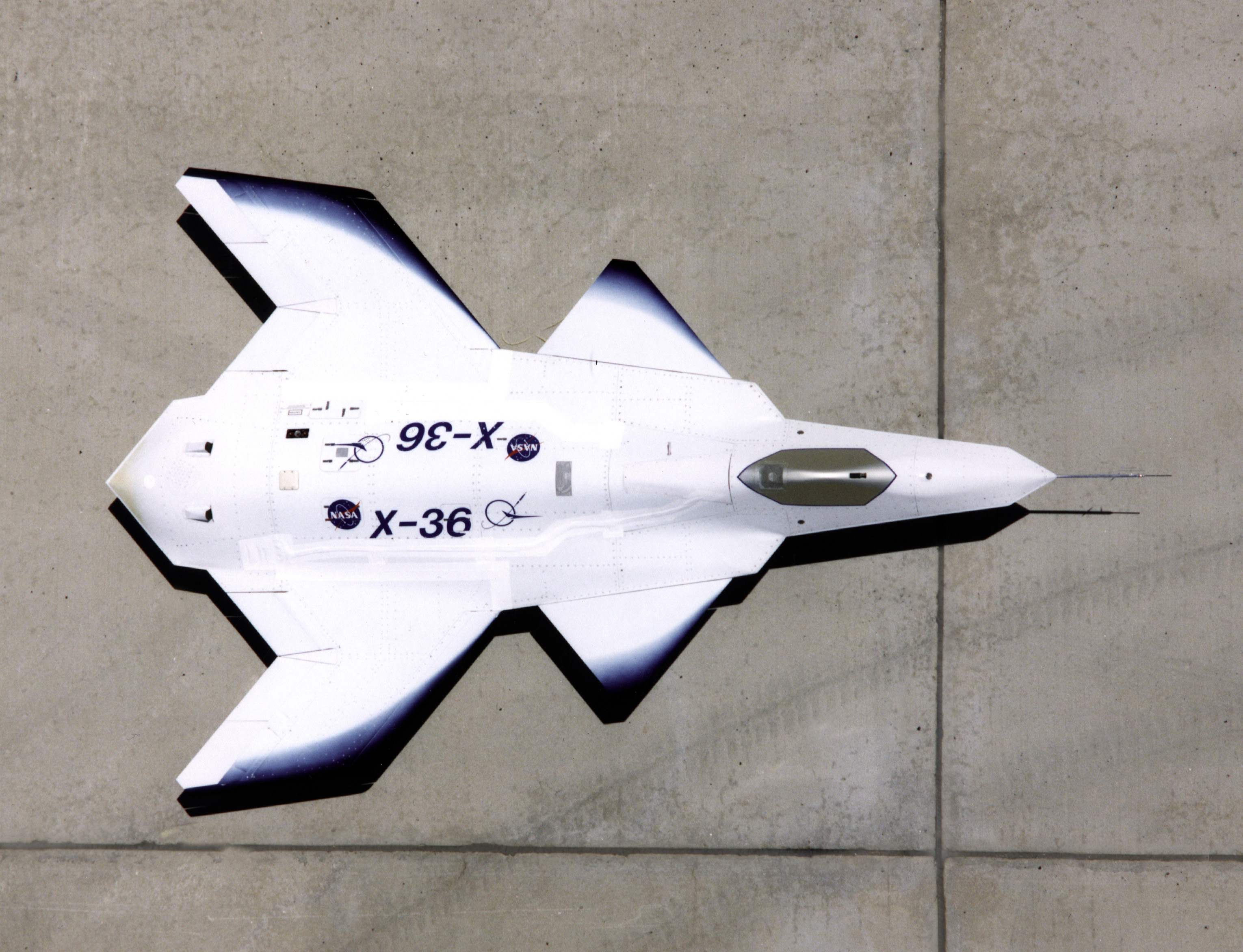
Plan view of the X-36

The X-36 was built to 28% scale of a possible fighter aircraft and was controlled by a pilot in a ground-based virtual cockpit with a view provided by a video camera mounted in the canopy of the aircraft.

For control, a canard forward of the wing was used as well as split ailerons and an advanced thrust vectoring nozzle for directional control. The X-36 was unstable in both pitch and yaw axes, so an advanced digital fly-by-wire control system was used to provide stability.

First flown on 17 May 1997, it made 31 successful research flights. It handled very well, and the program is reported to have met or exceeded all project goals. McDonnell Douglas merged with Boeing in August 1997 while the test program was in progress; the aircraft is sometimes referred to as the Boeing X-36.

The X-36 possessed high maneuverability that would be ideal for use as a fighter. Despite its potential suitability, and highly successful test program, there have been no reports regarding further development of the X-36 or any derived design as of 2026.

== Preservation ==
- The first X-36 is at the National Museum of the United States Air Force at Wright-Patterson Air Force Base near Dayton, Ohio. It arrived on July 16, 2003, the same day as the Boeing Bird of Prey and is displayed in the Museum's Research & Development Gallery.
- The second X-36 is displayed outside the Air Force Test Flight Center Museum at Edwards Air Force Base in California.
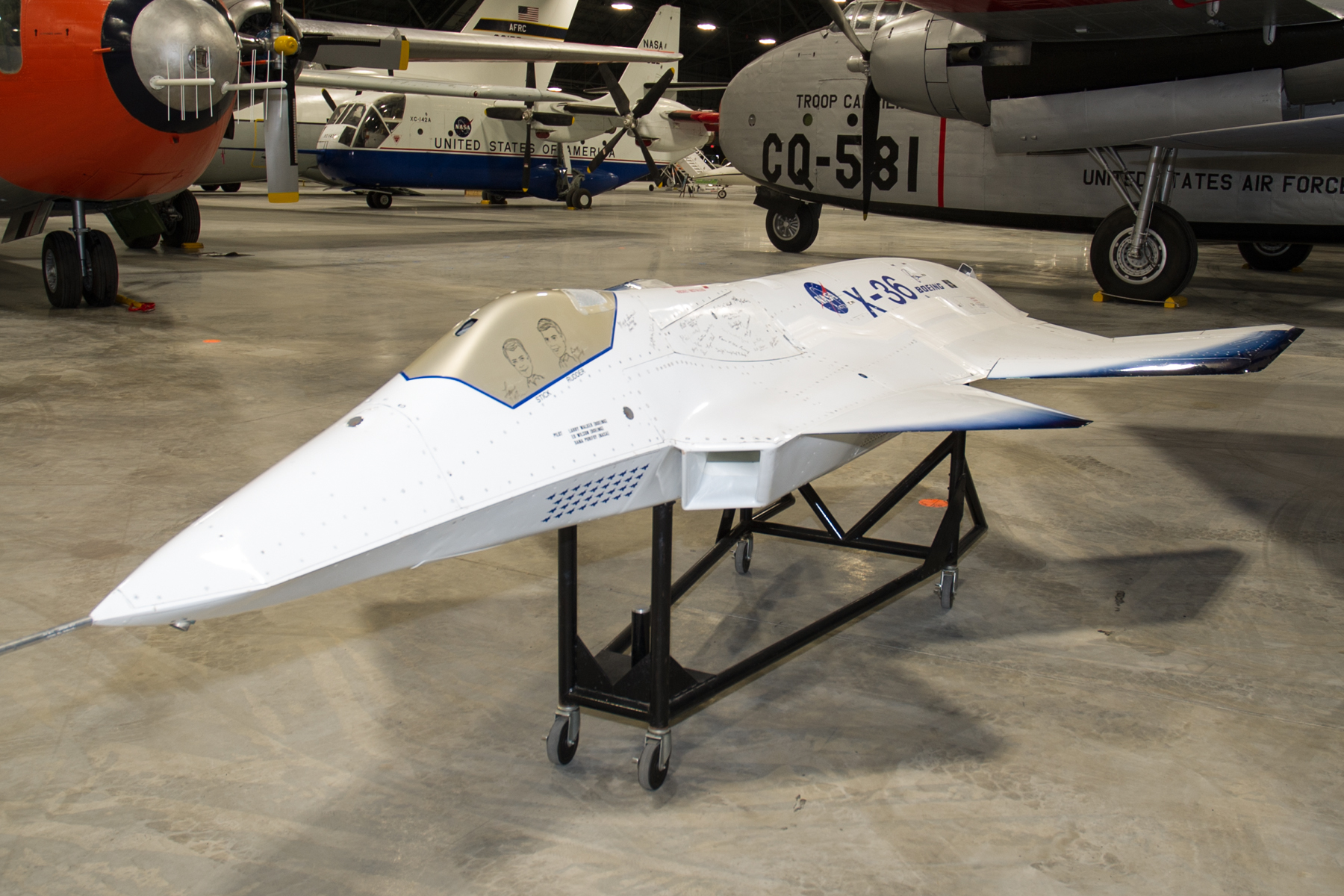
X-36 at the National Museum of the United States Air Force

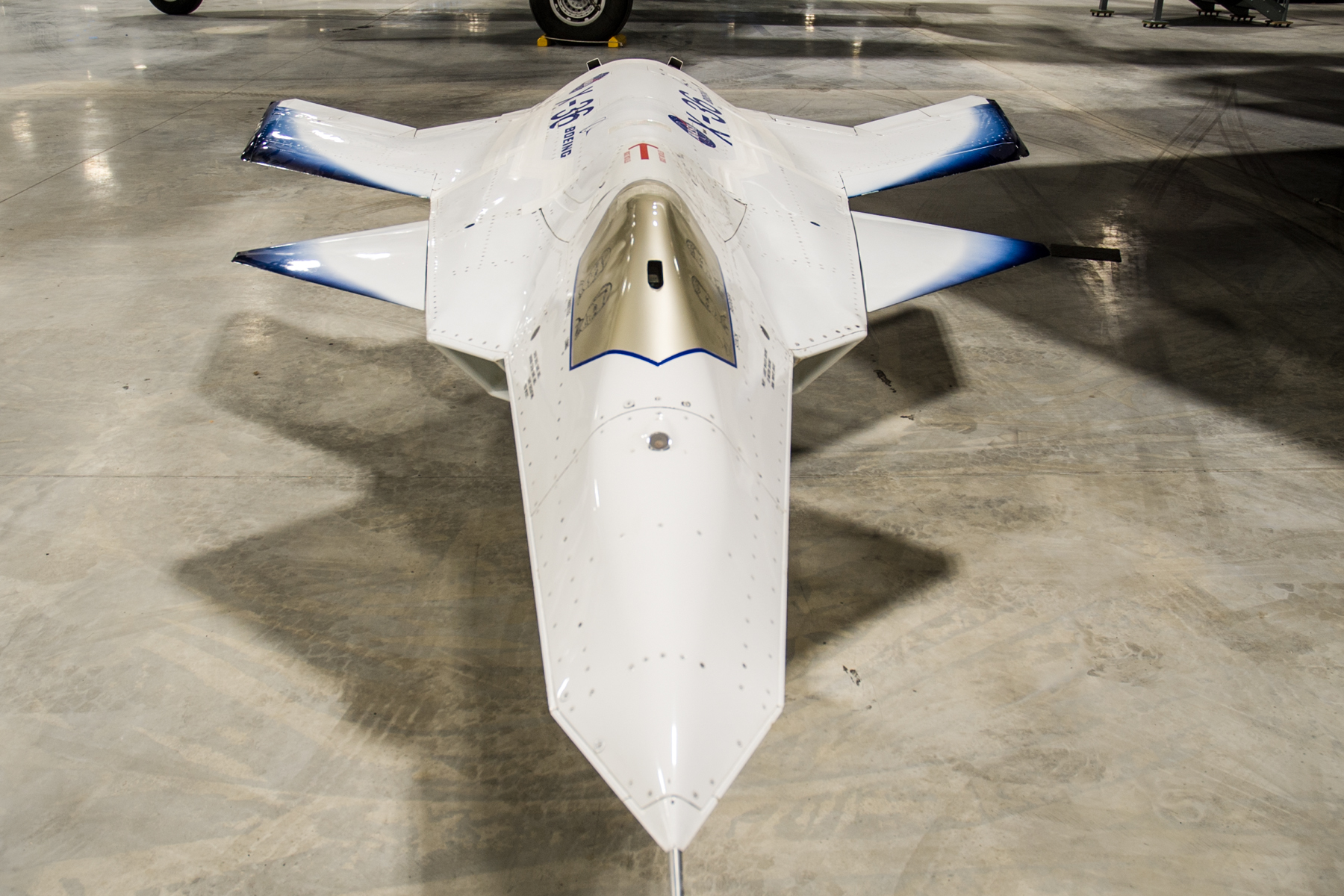

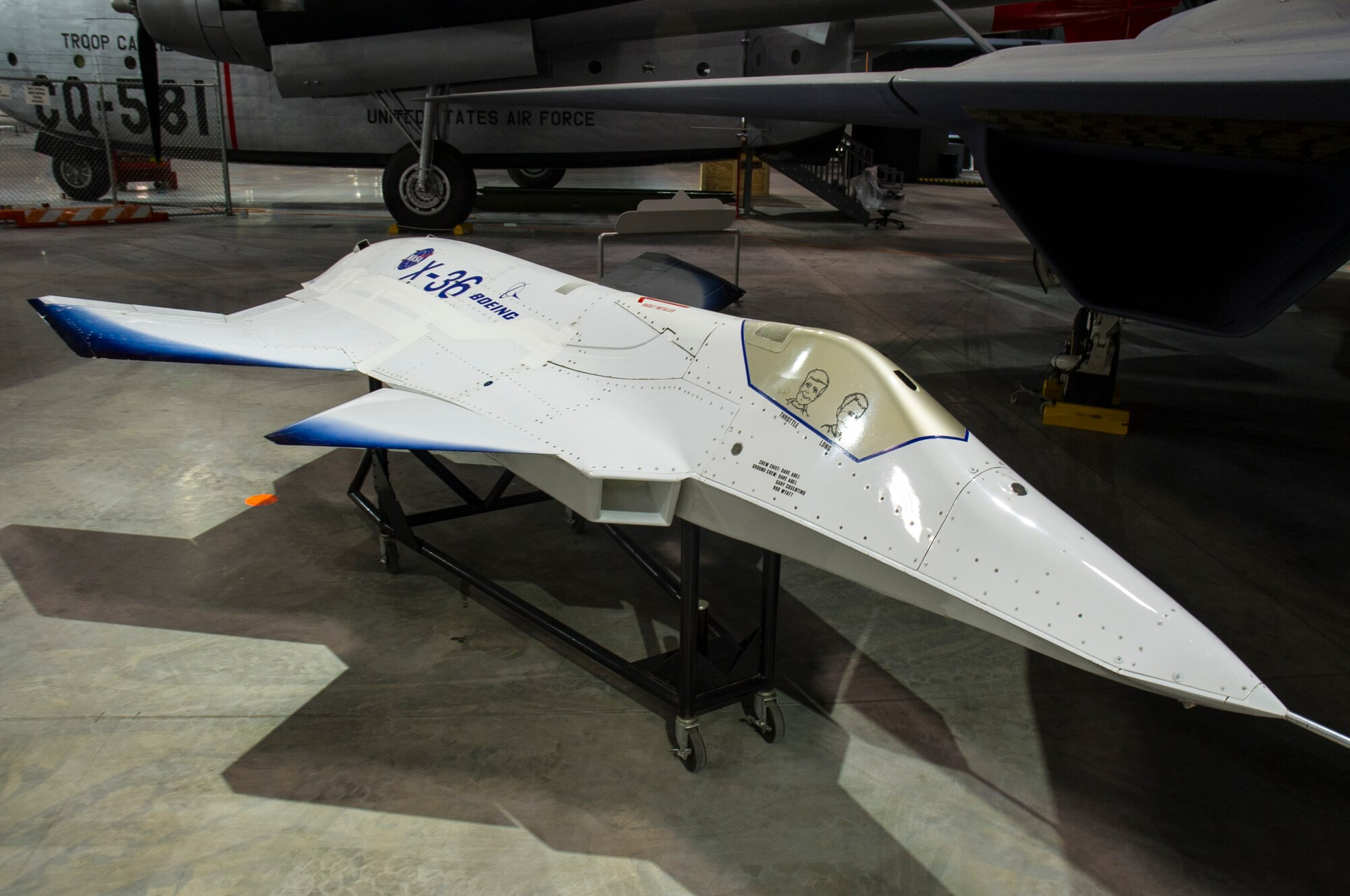

== Specifications (X-36) ==

Data from Jane's All the World's Aircraft 1997-98, Designation Systems, American X-Vehicles

General characteristics

- Length: 18 ft 2.5 in (5.550 m) including pitot boom
- Wingspan: 10 ft 5 in (3.18 m)
- Height: 3 ft 1.25 in (0.9462 m)
- Empty weight: 1,090 lb (494 kg)
- Max takeoff weight: 1,270 lb (576 kg)
- Fuel capacity: 180 lb (82 kg)
- Powerplant: 1 × Williams F112 turbofan engine, 700 lbf (3.1 kN) thrust

Performance

- Maximum speed: 160 kn (180 mph, 300 km/h) initial flight test limit

243 kn (280 mph; 450 km/h) later limit

- Approach speed: 110 kn (127 mph; 204 km/h)
- Service ceiling: 20,500 ft (6,200 m)
- g limits: +5
- Thrust/weight: 0.56

== Gallery ==
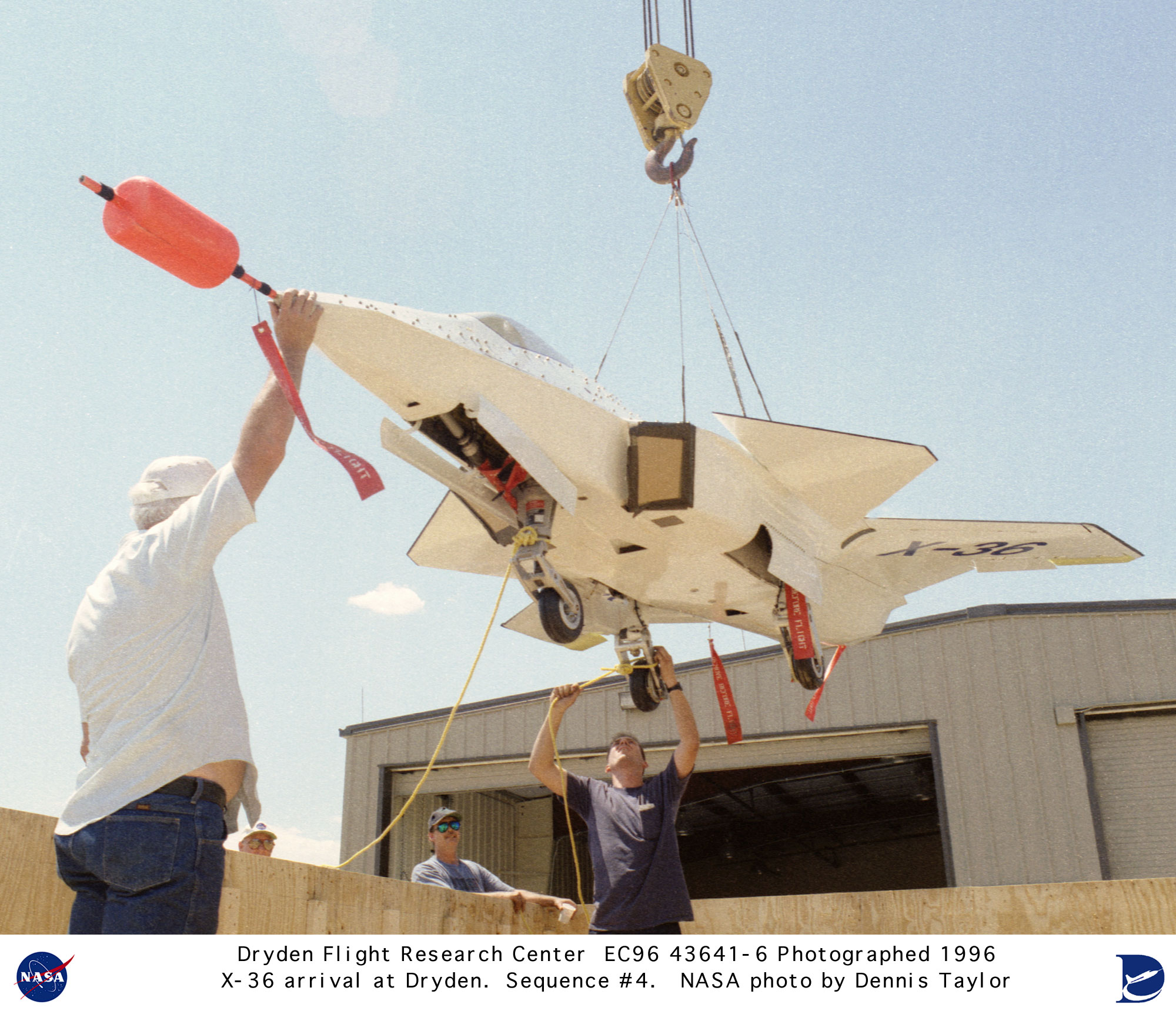
The aircraft is hoisted following its arrival at NASA Dryden Flight Research Center in July 1996

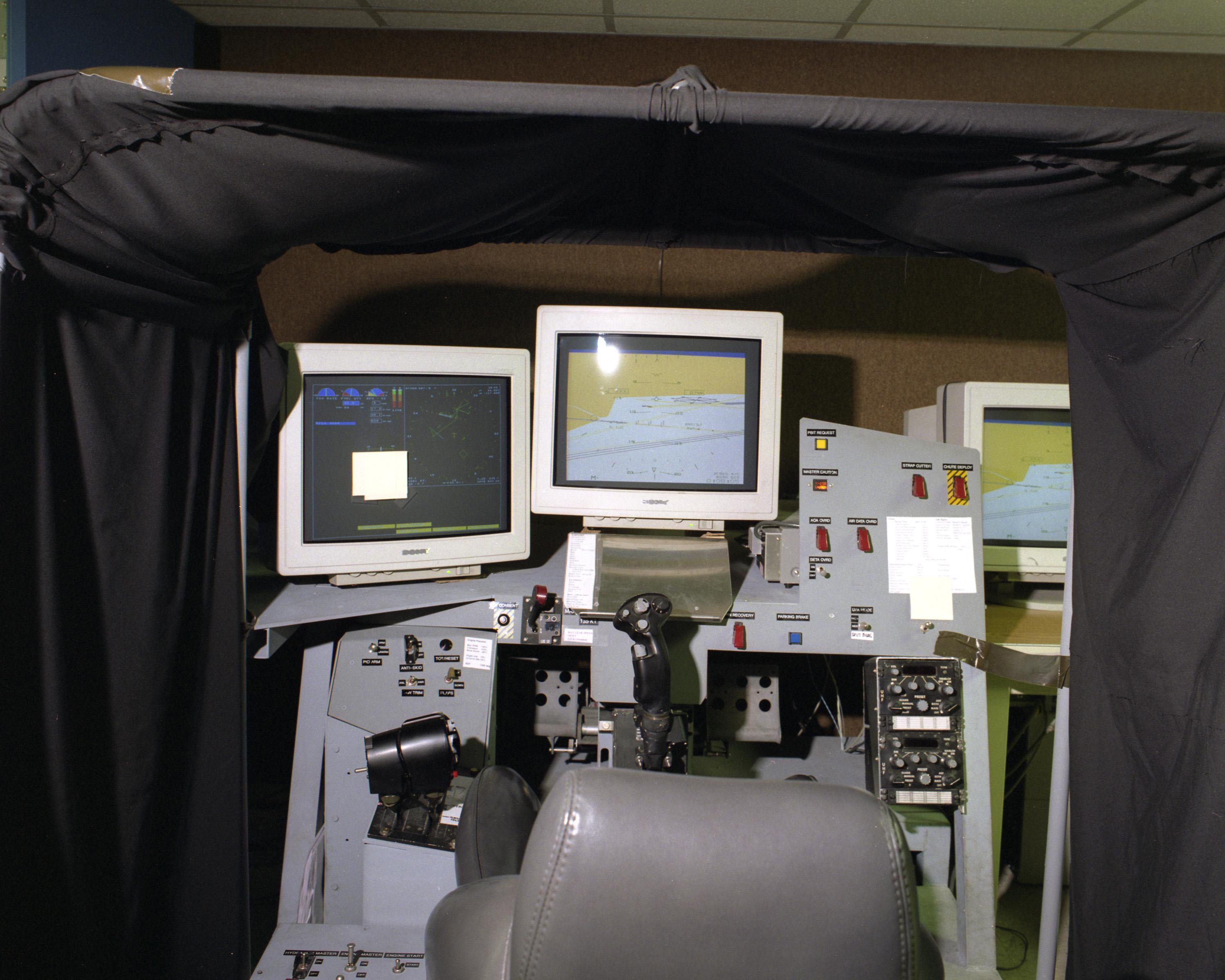
Remote cockpit

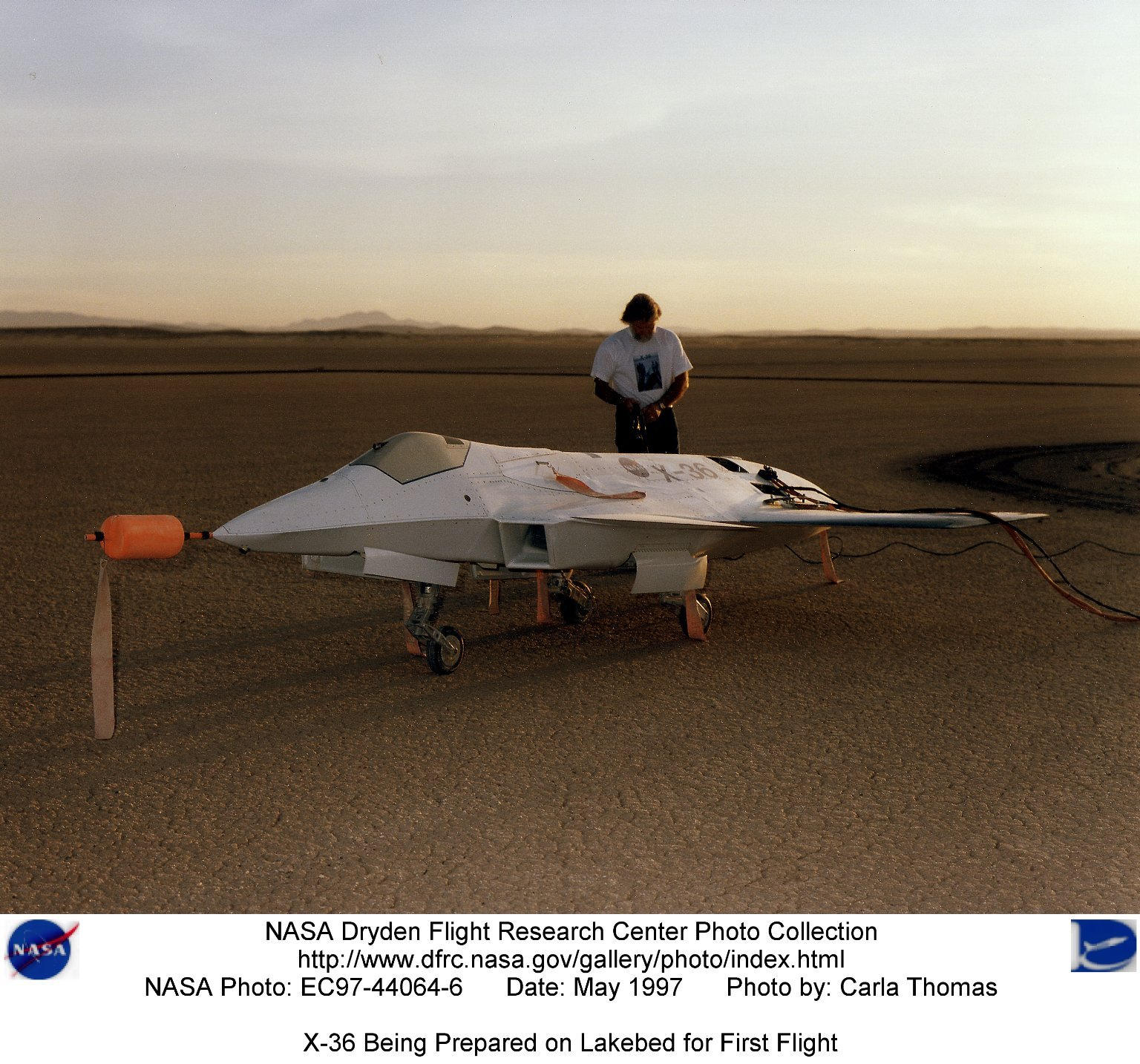
A technician at Dryden prepares the X-36 for its first flight

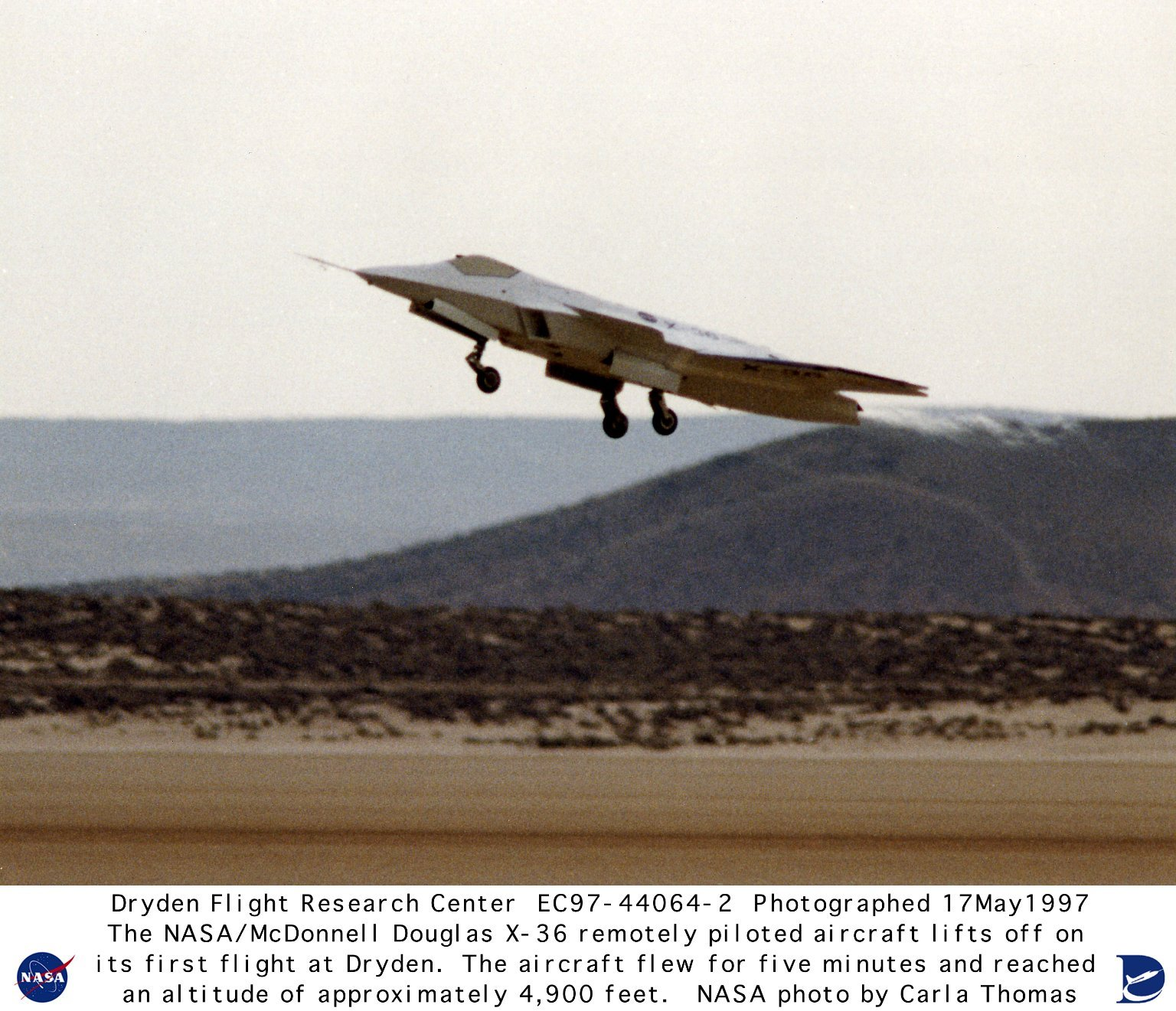
First flight 17 May 1997

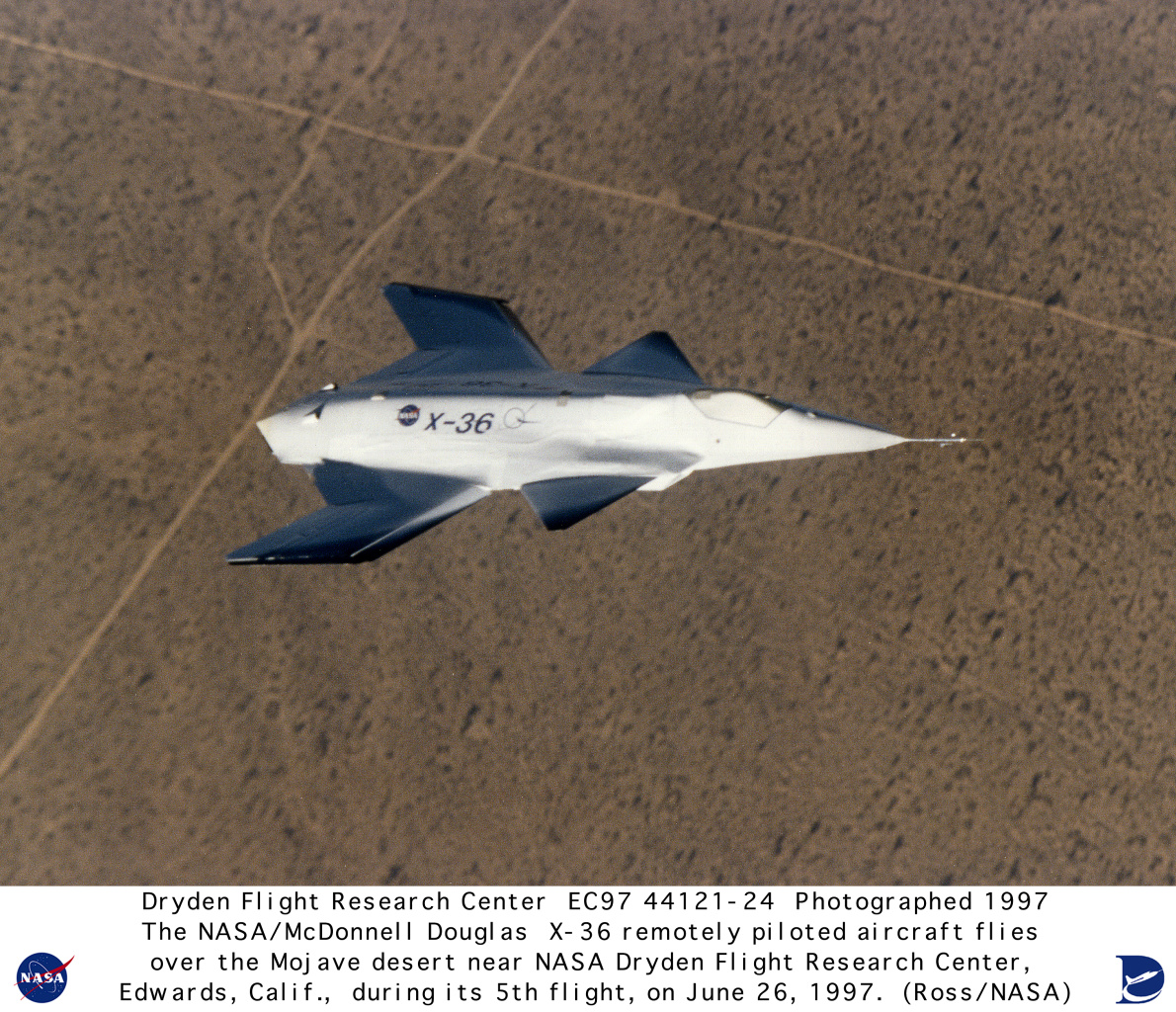
In flight June 1997

== See also ==
- Tailless aircraft
- Ace Combat
  - Ace Combat 3: Electrosphere
  - Ace Combat 8: Wings of Theve

Related development

- Boeing X-45

Aircraft of comparable role, configuration, and era

- Boeing Bird of Prey

Related lists

- List of experimental aircraft
