= Boeing X-50 Dragonfly =

US experimental drone aircraft

X-50 Dragonfly
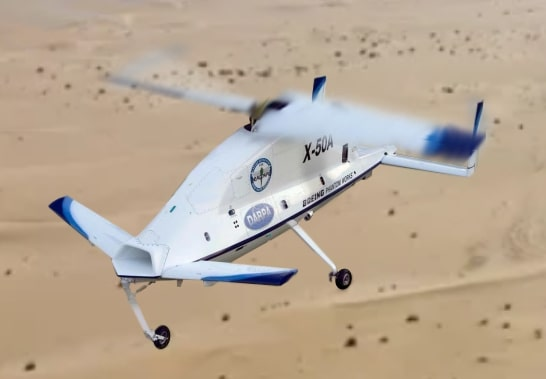

General information
- Type: Experimental UAV rotorcraft
- Manufacturer: Boeing
- Status: Canceled
- Primary user: DARPA
- Number built: 2

History
- First flight: 24 November 2003

The Boeing X-50A Dragonfly, formerly known as the Canard Rotor/Wing Demonstrator, was a VTOL rotor wing experimental unmanned aerial vehicle that was developed by Boeing and DARPA to demonstrate the principle that a helicopter's rotor could be stopped in flight and act as a fixed wing, enabling it to transition between fixed-wing and rotary-wing flight.

The X-50A built upon the work of the Sikorsky S-72 X-Wing program of the 1980s by designing the vehicle as a multi-mode aircraft from the ground up. The X-50A was one of two projects funded by DARPA in its "Heliplane" program.

Neither of the two prototype aircraft ever successfully transitioned to full forward flight. DARPA withdrew funding for the X-50 program in late 2006 due to inherent design flaws.

== Development ==
Boeing initially proposed using the CRW configuration to fill a requirement for a VTOL aircraft suitable for escorting the V-22 tiltrotor.

The X-50A was a joint program between Boeing and DARPA, with each paying for half the development costs. The X-50A was powered by a single conventional turbofan engine. For rotary-wing mode, the engine's exhaust was diverted to nozzles in the tips of the rotor blades. When the aircraft transitioned to full forward flight, the engine exhaust was directed through a nozzle at the rear of the aircraft and the rotor was locked into a fixed position and functioned as a conventional wing. Two proof-of-concept aircraft were built as part of the program. The X-50A's maiden flight took place on 24 November 2003.

== Design ==
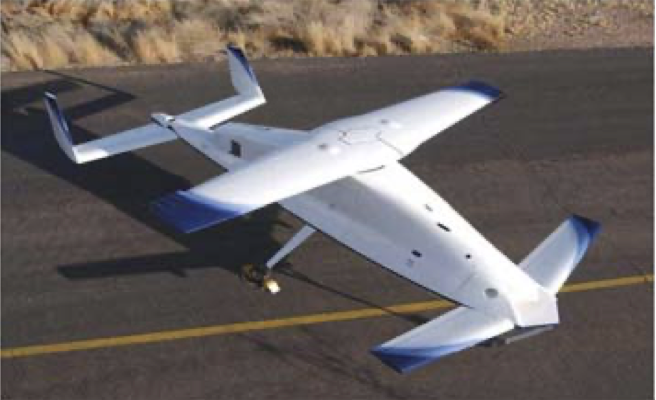
X-50 on the ground

The X-50 had a "canard" foreplane as well as a conventional tailplane, allowing both to contribute lift during forward flight and to offload the main rotor wing.

For vertical take-off, hovering, low-speed flight, and vertical landing, the main rotor wing was driven by tip jets, by directing the exhaust from a jet engine through thrust nozzles in the rotor tips. Because the rotor is driven directly by jet thrust, there is no need for a tail rotor to control torque as in a conventional helicopter.

For high-speed forward flight, the exhaust is redirected through an ordinary jet nozzle and the rotor wing is stopped and held in a fixed position, as in a conventional airplane.

== Operation ==
=== Crashes ===
During the third flight of the prototype X-50A, on 23 March 2004, the vehicle crashed, as a result of cross-coupling in the controls.

A second, improved prototype ("Ship 2") was then built. On its sixth of 11 planned test flights, Ship 2 was completely destroyed in a crash at the Yuma Proving Ground on April 12, 2006. Subsequent investigation revealed that the aircraft's fuselage was subject to an aerodynamic pitching moment of extreme sensitivity. Both airspeed and rotor wake would produce a nose-up pitching motion that was greater than the flight controls could compensate for.

=== Outcome ===
Neither aircraft was able to achieve transition to full forward flight mode during the portions of the test flight program that were completed. In September, 2006, DARPA recognized the inherent design flaws and withdrew funding for the program.

== Specifications ==
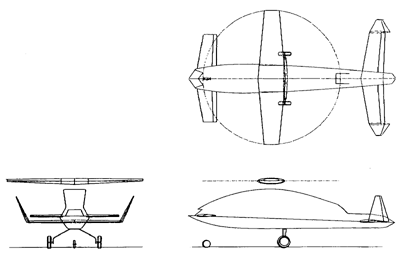
3-view line drawing

General characteristics

- Capacity: 201 lb (91 kg)
- Length: 17 ft 8 in (5.38 m)
- Mid wingspan: 8 ft 10 in (2.69 m)
- Lower wingspan: 8 ft 1 in (2.47 m)
- Height: 6 ft 6 in (1.98 m)
- Empty weight: 1,265 lb (574 kg)
- Gross weight: 1,422 lb (645 kg)
- Fuel capacity: 146 lb (66 kg)
- Powerplant: 1 × Williams F112 turbofan
- Main rotor diameter: 12 ft (3.7 m)

Performance

- Maximum speed: 430 mph (700 km/h, 380 kn)
- Cruise speed: 173 mph (278 km/h, 150 kn)

== See also ==
- Sikorsky X-Wing
