= Richard C. Scherrer =

American aerospace engineer (1919–2018)

Richard C. Scherrer (1919–2018) was an aircraft designer notable for pioneering work on revolutionary aircraft designs with extremely low radar cross sections that led to the Lockheed F-117 Nighthawk and Northrop Grumman B-2 Spirit.

== Career ==
Dick Scherrer graduated from the University of Washington, with a BSc in Aeronautical Engineering, in 1942.

From 1942 to 1959 he worked at the NACA (later NASA) Ames Research Center. There, he conducted flight research programs with thermal de-icing systems and wind tunnel tests of supersonic aerodynamic heating, internal and external aerodynamics. He was also a member of NACA Internal Aerodynamics Subcommittee and assistant head of the 1x3-foot Supersonic Wind Tunnel Branch. Early in his time at NACA, in 1942, he wrote a proposal to develop both a jet engine and a research aircraft to test it. Likely unaware of the work being done at NACA Langley, let alone of the top secret acquisition of the Whittle engine by Air Corps Chief Hap Arnold in the spring of 1941, Scherrer never managed to acquire the necessary support to continue his jet propulsion research.

From 1955 to 1965 he also worked as an independent engineering design consultant to Arrow Development on the design of “Dumbo”, “Tea Party”, “Matterhorn”, “Little Train That Could” and “Flying Saucers” rides for the Disneyland theme park.

In June 1959 he went to work at Lockheed-California in Burbank California. At Lockheed, he conducted anti-submarine warfare (ASW) system analyses and airplane design studies to establish requirements and capabilities for the Lockheed P-3 Orion and Lockheed S-3 Viking aircraft. He was also responsible for a wide range of military aircraft systems and study proposals, including transonic VTOL attack and covert turbofan prototypes, studies of rotary wing aircraft, advanced fighters, attack aircraft, surveillance and ASW patrol aircraft systems. This led to work as proposal manager for the initial Lockheed VSX studies, which led to the S-3 Viking. In addition, he designed Lockheed's entry in the TFX competition (won by the General Dynamics F-111 Aardvark) and the AX competition (won by the Fairchild A-10 Thunderbolt II. He also managed the initial Lockheed L-1011 TriStar design trade-off studies group and was manager of NASA-Lockheed short haul transport system study contract. In 1968 and 1974 he was a participant in the first and second AIAA symposiums on the aerodynamics of sports and competition automobiles, held in Los Angeles.

In February 1975, he was recruited by Ed Martin, Science and engineering director of Lockheed, to work in the Skunk Works as the Project Manager responsible for developing the basic airplane design concept for a DARPA/US Air Force competition to develop a low radar cross-section aircraft. Working with radar expert Denys Overholser, mathematician Bill Schroeder and senior lead airplane designer Ken Watson, they produced a design that won the competition. The result was the Have Blue technology demonstrator that led to the Lockheed F-117 Nighthawk. During the summer of 1976, Dick suffered a stroke and left the program. After recuperating, he returned to Lockheed a year later as Chief Advanced Design Engineer of the Skunk Works. In this position, he worked on the design of a low radar cross-section reconnaissance aircraft. In the mid-1980s the Airforce Chief Engineer for Stealth programs, Bill Elsner, has been quoted as saying " there would never have been a Stealth Airplane but for the genius of Dick Scherrer."

In September 1979 he left Lockheed and went to work at the Northrop Corporation as a design consultant on their entry for the Advanced Technology Bomber. There, he refined the planform, airfoils and internal arrangement of what became the Northrop Grumman B-2 Spirit after Northrop won the US Air Force competition. Starting in July 1984 he worked at Ling-Temco-Vought on developing a design for the US Navy AX competition. In doing so, he supervised large scale radar cross-section model detail design, fabrication and testing. This competition was won by the McDonnell Douglas A-12 Avenger II. From October 1985 to December 1986 he conducted project review tasks for DARPA and SAIC at Boeing Military Airplane Company and Sikorsky Aircraft. In July 1987 he returned to Northrop where he worked for four years, conducting preliminary design studies of future stealth aircraft.

After retiring to Marrowstone Island in Washington state, he worked on the development of new models for Express Aircraft, including retractable landing gear and turbine powered variants.

In 1995, Dick received the Distinguished Alumni award from the Department of Aeronautics & Astronautics of the University of Washington and in 2010 he was elected to membership in the National Academy of Engineering. He was also an Associate Fellow of the American Institute of Aeronautics and Astronautics.
