= Williams F112 =

Small turbofan engine in the US military

F112
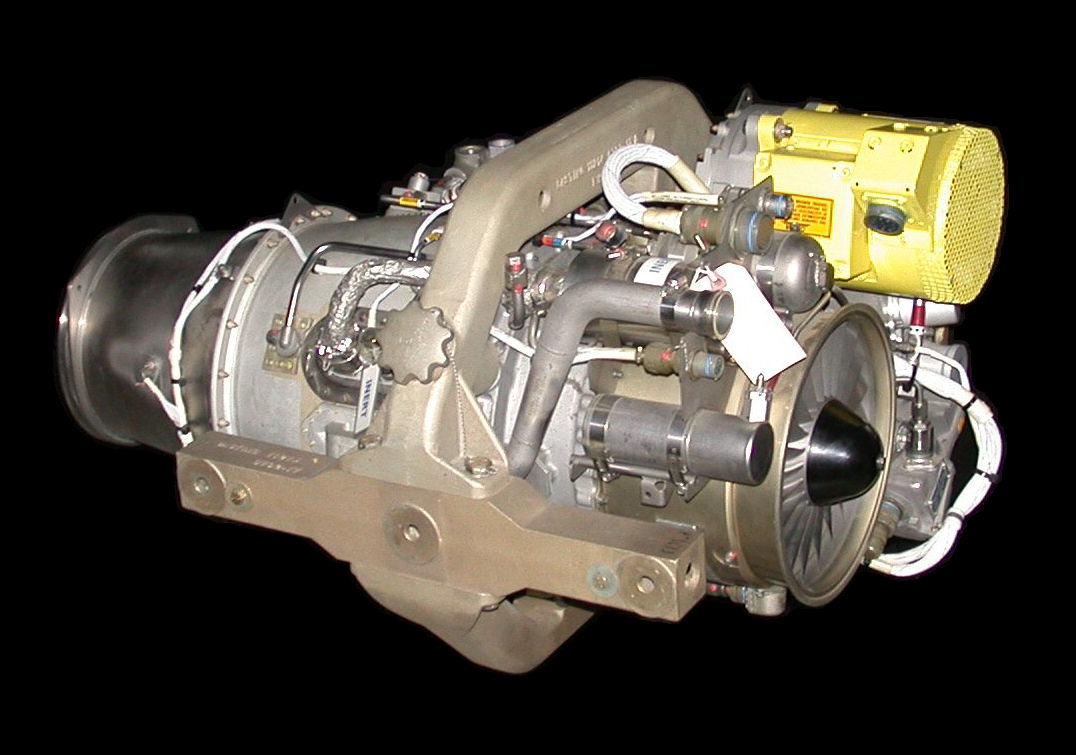
- An F112 engine on display at the National Museum of the United States Air Force
- Type: Turbofan
- National origin: United States
- Manufacturer: Williams International
- First run: 1970s
- Major applications: AGM-129 ACM
- Developed from: Williams F107

The Williams F112 is a small turbofan engine made by Williams International designed to power cruise missiles. It has been used as the powerplant for the AGM-129 Advanced Cruise Missile and the AGM-86B advanced cruise missile, as well as the experimental X-36 and X-50.

== Design and development ==
Although Williams originally designed these small turbofans to power target drones while aiming for a contract in the Subsonic Cruise Armed Decoy (SCAD) program, it quickly became apparent that these were valuable tools to be used in the future to power advanced cruise missiles. Originally designated the F107-WR-14A6, then designated the F107-WR-103 by Williams then designated the F112-WR-100 by the USAF.

Though the true benefits that the F112 brought to the AGM-129 are classified, it has been said that the F112 increased the range of the AGM-129 to four times that of the AGM-86B. Another benefit is that the infrared heat signature has also been reduced or nearly eliminated, aiding the stealthiness of the AGM-129. This was accomplished with the use of high tech materials and coatings.

== Applications ==
- AGM-129 ACM
- Boeing X-50
- McDonnell Douglas X-36

== Specifications ==
==== General characteristics ====
- Type: twin-spool counter-rotating turbofan
- Length: 29.5 in (750 mm)
- Diameter: 12 in (300 mm) at widest point
- Dry weight: 161 lb (73 kg); 99 lb (45 kg) without accessories

==== Components ====
- Compressor: twin-spool, counter-rotating
- Combustors: annular
- Turbine: axial
- Fuel type: JP-10 (heavy fuel Boron-Slurry)
- Oil system: self-contained; 1.3 US pints (620 ml)

==== Performance ====
- Maximum thrust: 732 lbf (332 kgf; 3.26 kN)
- Overall pressure ratio: 30:1
- Bypass ratio: 1:1
- Turbine inlet temperature: 2,000 °F (1,090 °C) without turbine blade cooling; 1,750 °F (950 °C) with turbine blade cooling
- Specific fuel consumption: ≈ 0.25 lb/(lbf⋅h) (7.1 g/(kN⋅s)) at SLS and ISA; some calculations bring this number to 0.15 lb/(lbf⋅h)
- Thrust-to-weight ratio: 4.73

== See also ==
Related development

- Williams F107

Related lists

- List of aircraft engines
