= Pyotr Ufimtsev =

Soviet and Russian mathematician and physicist

Pyotr Yakovlevich Ufimtsev
- Born: 8 July 1931 (age 95); Ust-Charyshskaya Pristan, West Siberian Krai, Russian SFSR, Soviet Union
- Education: Odesa State University
- Known for: Stealth technology Physical theory of diffraction
- Scientific career
- Fields: Electrical engineering, Physics
- Workplaces: Institute of Radio-engineering and Electronics

Pyotr (Petr) Yakovlevich Ufimtsev (Russian: Пётр Я́ковлевич Уфи́мцев; born 8 July 1931) is a Soviet and Russian electrical engineer and mathematical physicist, best known for his pioneering work on the physical theory of diffraction (PTD), which laid the groundwork for modern stealth aircraft technology. His research on how electromagnetic waves reflect from surfaces like edges and vertices became critical in the development of aircraft with reduced radar signatures.

== Biography ==
Pyotr Yakovlevich Ufimtsev was born into a peasant family in the village of Ust-Charyshskaya Pristan, located in the Altai region of the West Siberian Krai (now part of Altai Krai) in the Russian Soviet Federative Socialist Republic (RSFSR), then part of the Soviet Union (USSR). His early life was marked by tragedy — when he was just three years old, his father was repressed by the Soviet regime and later died in a gulag, a fate shared by many victims of Stalin's Great Purge.

Ufimtsev pursued a career in academia and engineering, earning a Ph.D. in electrical engineering from the Central Research Radio Engineering Institute of the Defense Ministry in Moscow in 1959. He continued his studies and was later awarded a Doctor of Science (Dr. Sc.) degree in theoretical and mathematical physics from Saint Petersburg University (formerly Leningrad State University) in 1970. His doctoral work further solidified his position as a key figure in the fields of electromagnetic wave theory and diffraction physics.

== Stealth technology research ==
While working in Moscow, Pyotr Ufimtsev became interested in the reflection of electromagnetic waves. He was granted permission to publish his research results internationally because they were deemed to have no significant military or economic value.

A stealth engineer at Lockheed, Denys Overholser, read Ufimtsev’s publication and realized that he had developed the mathematical theory and tools necessary for finite element analysis of radar reflection. This discovery played a key role in the design of the first true stealth aircraft, the Lockheed F-117. Northrop also utilized Ufimtsev's work to program supercomputers to predict the radar reflection of the B-2 bomber.

In the 1960s, Ufimtsev began developing a high-frequency asymptotic theory for predicting the scattering of electromagnetic waves from two-dimensional and three-dimensional objects. These objects included finite bodies of revolution, such as disks, finite cylinders with flat bases, finite cones, finite paraboloids, spherical segments, and finite thin wires. This theory is now known as the Physical Theory of Diffraction (PTD).

The first results of PTD were compiled in the book Method of Edge Waves in the Physical Theory of Diffraction by P. Ya. Ufimtsev, published by Soviet Radio, Moscow, in 1962. In 1971, this book was translated into English under the same title by the U.S. Air Force’s Foreign Technology Division (National Air and Space Intelligence Center), Wright-Patterson AFB, OH. This translation, documented as Technical Report AD 733203, was filed with the Defense Technical Information Center of the United States, Alexandria, VA. The PTD theory played a critical role in the design of American stealth aircraft, such as the F-117 and B-2.

Forewords by K. Mitzner in the following books further elaborate on the development and application of PTD:

- Ufimtsev, P. Ya. Theory of Edge Diffraction in Electromagnetics, Tech Science Press, Encino, California, 2003.
- Ufimtsev, P. Ya. Fundamentals of the Physical Theory of Diffraction, Wiley & Sons, Inc., Hoboken, New Jersey, 1st edition 2007 and 2nd edition 2014.

In these two books, Ufimtsev expanded upon PTD and its validation through mathematical theory. Notably, a new version of PTD, based on the concept of elementary edge waves, is presented in Fundamentals of the Physical Theory of Diffraction (2007, 2014). With appropriate modifications, PTD can be used to solve various practical problems. These applications include the design of microwave antennas, mobile radio communication, the construction of acoustic barriers to reduce noise levels, and the evaluation of radar cross sections for large objects, such as tanks, ships, and missiles.

Dr. Ufimtsev has been affiliated with several research and academic institutions, including the Institute of Radio Engineering and Electronics of the USSR Academy of Sciences (Moscow), the Moscow Aviation Institute, the University of California (Los Angeles, Irvine), Moscow State University (Russia, 2007), and the University of Siena (Italy, 2008). Currently, he is a retiree and a consultant in the field of electromagnetics. Among his honors and awards are the USSR State Prize, the Leroy Randle Grumman Medal, and recognition as an Honorary Member of the Pioneers of Stealth (February 2024, USA).

In September 1990, Ufimtsev joined the faculty of the University of California, Los Angeles (UCLA) as a visiting professor of electrical engineering.

== Books ==
- P. Ya. Ufimtsev, Theory of Edge Diffraction in Electromagnetics, 1st edition Tech Science Press, Encino, California, 2003. ISBN 0-9657001-7-8, 2nd edition SciTech Publishing, Inc. Raleigh, NC, USA, 2009. ISBN 9781891121661
- P. Ya. Ufimtsev, Fundamentals of the Physical Theory of Diffraction, Wiley & Sons, Inc., Hoboken, New Jersey, 1st edition 2007. ISBN 0-470-09771-X; 2nd edition 2014, ISBN 978-1-118-75366-8
- P. Ya. Ufimtsev, Method of Edge Waves in the Physical Theory of Diffraction, Soviet Radio, Moscow, 1962
- P. Ya. Ufimtsev, Rung T. Ling, Gokhan Apaydin, "Electromagnetic Surface Waves in Microwave Absorbing Layers", Cambridge Scholars Publishing, ISBN 978-1-0364-0426-0, 2024
