= Bleecker =

Bleecker is a Dutch-language occupational surname. Bleecker is an old spelling of (linnen)bleker ("linen bleacher"). Most if not all people listed below are descendants of Jan Jansen Bleecker/Bleeker, who came to New Amsterdam in 1658. In the Netherlands, only the spelling Bleeker is extant as a family name.

== People ==
- Ann Eliza Bleecker (1752–1783), American poet
- Anthony Bleecker (1770–1827), American author and lawyer
- Anthony Lispenard Bleecker (1741–1816), American banker and merchant
- Harmanus Bleecker (1779–1849), US congressman from New York, ambassador to the Netherlands
- Jan Jansen Bleecker (1641/42–1732), Dutch settler in New Netherland, mayor of New York
- Julian Bleecker (born ca. 1967), American mobile artist and technologist
- Katherine Russell Bleecker (1893–1996), American filmmaker in silent era
- Leon Bleecker (c. 1881–1933), New York assemblyman
- Maitland B. Bleecker (1903–2002), American inventor, instrumental in modern helicopter design

Adopted as first name

- A. Bleecker Banks (1835–1910), American book publisher and mayor of Albany

== Places ==
- Bleecker, New York, named after Barent Bleecker, 18th century landowner of the region
- Bleecker Park, Albany, New York
- Bleecker Street, New York City, named after Anthony Lispenard Bleecker
- Bleecker Stadium, Albany, New York, named after Albany businessman James Edward Bleecker
- Harmanus Bleecker Library, Albany, New York

== See also ==
Bleecker (Bleeker), Alabama

- Bleaker
- Bleecker Street (disambiguation)
- Bleeker (disambiguation)
