= Pfitzner (surname) =

Pfitzner is a German surname. Notable people with the surname include:

- Alexander Pfitzner (1880–1910), Hungarian-American engineer, designer and aviation pioneer
- Bernice Pfitzner (born 1938), Australian politician
- Gavin Pfitzner (born 1966), Australian tennis player
- Hans Pfitzner (1869–1949), German composer
- Josef Pfitzner (1901–1945), German politician
- Marc Pfitzner (born 1984), German footballer
