= Charles B. Kirkham =

American engineer of aircraft engines and aircraft

- Born: 1882
- Died: 1969 (aged 86–87)
- Occupation: Engineer
- Known for: Aircraft engines
- Parent: John Kirkham
- Relatives: Clarence Kirkham, Percey Kirkham

Charles B. Kirkham (1882–1969) was an American engineer of aircraft engines and aircraft.

== Early life ==
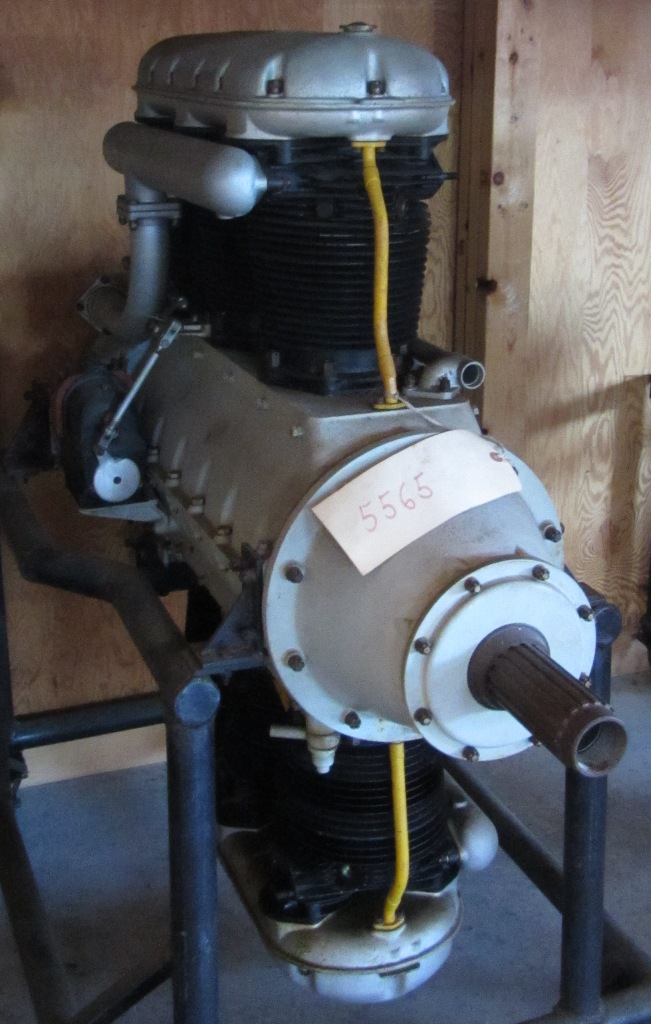
A vertically opposed Kirkham motor on display

Kirkham started engineering by building motorcycle engines. In 1903, Kirkham and Curtiss delivered an engine to Thomas C. Benbow for future use in a dirigible. In 1905 he founded the Kirkham Motor and Manufacturing Company in Bath, New York with two others and $25,000 in capital. His father John Kirkham cast engine blocks for Glen Curtiss up until 1905. Kirkham worked in Senaca Falls, becoming sick and returning home. Kirkham enrolled in a mechanical engineering correspondence course while recuperating. In 1910 Kirkham built his first aircraft engine of his own design. The Kirkham B-6 was used on the 1910 Burgess Company Model F. In 1913 Kirkham started another company, the Kirkham Aeroplane and Motor Company with $100,000 in capital. Kirkham joined Glenn Curtiss and went to work for Curtiss Aeroplane in 1915 as Chief motor engineer for the popular Curtiss OX and sole VX engine that powered the speedboat "Miss Miami".

Later Kirkham would top rival Hispano Suiza with the Curtiss AB, a 300 hp aluminum blocked, twelve-cylinder engine for fighter use. This engine would evolve into the K-12. Kirkham designed a Curtiss Triplane in 1919 to take full advantage of the K-12 engine. A Seaplane variant became the world's fastest seaplane in 1920 at 138 mph. A biplane variant for the U.S. Army label the Curtiss P-86, was dropped after the crash of a prototype.

In 1919 Kirkham left Curtiss to form Kirkham Products.

== See also ==
- Kirkham 1911 Biplane
- Curtiss K-12
- Curtiss 18
- Kirkham Air yacht
- Kirkham-Williams Racer
- Kirkham Racer
- Kirkham Gull
