= Bleeker =

Bleeker is a Dutch occupational surname. Bleeker is an old spelling of (linnen)bleker ("linen bleacher"). People with the surname include:

- Alex Bleeker (born 1986), American musician and guitarist
- Bernhard Bleeker (1881–1968), German sculptor
- C. Jouco Bleeker (1898–1983), Dutch phenomenologist of religion
- Eppie Bleeker (born 1949), Dutch speed skater
- Horst Bleeker (1938–2023), German swimmer
- Johan Bleeker (born 1942), Dutch space technology scientist
  - Named after him: the main-belt asteroid 9693 Bleeker
- Kevin Bleeker (born 1993), Dutch basketball player
- Lili Bleeker (1897–1985), Dutch physicist
- Mel Bleeker (1920–1996), American football player
- Piet Bleeker (1928–2018), Dutch long-distance runner
- Pieter Bleeker (1819–1874), a Dutch medical doctor, ichthyologist and herpetologist
  - Named after him: Bleeker smoothbelly sardinella, Bleeker's whipray, Bleeker's worm-eel

Fictional characters

- Paulie Bleeker, a character in the film Juno played by Michael Cera

== Other meanings ==
- Bleeker (band), a Canadian rock band named after Bleeker Street, Orillia, Ontario
- Bleeker: The Rechargeable Dog, a comic strip syndicated by Universal Press Syndicate

== See also ==
- Bleecker (disambiguation)
- Bleaker
