= Curtiss Eagle =

Eagle
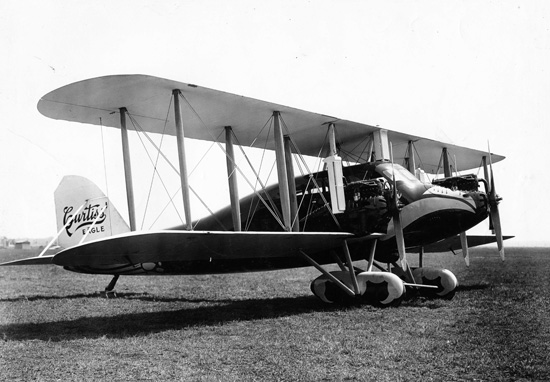
- Eagle in trimotor configuration

General information
- Type: Airliner
- Manufacturer: Curtiss
- Designer: William Gilmore
- Number built: ca. 24

History
- First flight: August 1919

The Curtiss Eagle (retroactively designated the Model 19 by Curtiss some years later) was an airliner produced in small numbers in the United States shortly after World War I. The aircraft was a conventional biplane with three-bay, unstaggered wings of equal span. The fuselage was a very advanced design for its day, incorporating careful streamlining of its monocoque structure, and offering the crew as well as the passengers a fully enclosed cabin. The Eagle is sometimes named as the first American tri-motor aircraft; however Curtiss' own Model H flying boat flew with three engines for a time in 1914 before being converted back to twin-engine configuration.

== Development ==
Curtiss had developed the Eagle in preparation for an anticipated post-war boom in civil aviation. In fact, this boom was far smaller than Curtiss had been hoping for, and practically all of the demand for passenger aircraft was met by the conversion of war-surplus military aircraft that could be purchased extremely cheaply. As such, only around 20 machines were built. The original trimotor Eagle design was followed by a single example of the Eagle II, with twin engines, and by three Eagle IIIs with only one engine. These latter aircraft were purchased by the United States Army Air Service, which used them as staff transports and converted one example into an air ambulance.

== Operational history ==
A U.S. Army Air Service Curtiss Eagle air ambulance serial 64243, of the 1st Provisional Air Brigade, crashed during a thunderstorm while attempting to land at Morgantown, Maryland while returning to Bolling Field, District of Columbia, from Langley Field, Virginia on 28 May 1921 in one of the worst major flying accidents in the US at that time. The pilot and six passengers died. Two United States congressmen had chosen not to make the flight because of airsickness on the flight from Washington to Langley. The Army's Inspector General conducted an investigation of the crash and theorized that the aircraft stalled when it encountered an updraft at low altitude while trying to clear trees near the unfamiliar field and fell nose first, into the ground.

== Variants ==
Curtiss Eagle
Three-engined passenger airliner, accommodating two pilots and eight passengers, powered by three 150-hp (112-kW) Curtiss K-6 piston engines.
Eagle II
Twin-engined version, powered by two 400-hp (298-kW) Curtiss C-12 engines; one built.
Eagle III
Single-engined version, powered by a 400-hp (298-kW) Liberty L-12 engine; three built.

== Operators ==
United States

- United States Army

== Specifications (Eagle I) ==
Data from Curtiss Aircraft 1907–1947, Aerofiles : Curtiss

General characteristics

- Crew: 2
- Capacity: Up to six passengers, or 2,320 lb (1,050 kg) of payload
- Length: 36 ft 9 in (11.20 m)
- Wingspan: 61 ft 4 in (18.69 m)
- Height: 12 ft 4 in (3.76 m)
- Wing area: 900 sq ft (84 m^{2})
- Empty weight: 5,130 lb (2,327 kg)
- Gross weight: 7,450 lb (3,379 kg)
- Powerplant: 3 × Curtiss K-6 , 150 hp (110 kW) each at 1,700 rpm
- Propellers: 2-bladed fixed-pitch propellers

Performance

- Maximum speed: 107 mph (172 km/h, 93 kn)
- Cruise speed: 75 mph (121 km/h, 65 kn)
- Stall speed: 55 mph (89 km/h, 48 kn)
- Range: 350 mi (560 km, 300 nmi) to 475 mi (413 nmi; 764 km)
- Time to altitude: 4,075 ft (1,242 m) in 10 minutes
