= Noadiah Russell =

The Reverend Noadiah Russell (22 July 1659 – 3 December 1713) was a Congregationalist minister, a founder and trustee of Yale College, and one of the framers of the Saybrook Platform.

== Life ==
Russell was born in New Haven, Connecticut, the son of William Russell, who emigrated from England in 1638, and his wife Sarah Davis.

A GENERAL HISTORY OF MIDDLESEX COUNTY, published in 1884, J.H. Beers & Co., New York, characterized father and son as progenitors thus: "The RUSSELLs have been identified with the history of Middletown for nearly two hundred years, and each generation has left its impress on the community by the noble deeds and Christian virtues of its several members.

The family is a branch of the English line so well known, and William Russell, the emigrant, is said to have accompanied Colonel Fenwick, Robert Greville, second Lord Brooke, being connected by marriage with the latter."

William died in 1665. His will requested that his "son be devoted to God in the way of learning, being likely to prove a useful instrument in the good work of the ministry." Noadiah was graduated from Harvard in 1681, and became a teacher. He was ordained at Middletown on 24 October 1688.

Along with his cousin, Samuel Russell, he was one of the ten founders of Yale in 1701 and a trustee of Yale College from 1701 to 1713.

Russell married Mary Hamlin, daughter of Captain Giles Hamlin and Hester Crow Hamlin, on 20 February 1689/90 at Middletown, Connecticut. They had nine children. Their eldest son Rev. William Russell, graduated from Yale in 1709, and his wife Mary Pierpont, daughter of another Yale founder, Rev. James Pierpont, were parents of another Reverend Noadiah Russell.

Russell was pastor of the First Congregational Church in Middletown, Connecticut, for 25 years, until his death. He was succeeded as pastor by his son, William. Russell was buried in Riverside Cemetery in Middletown.

Noadiah Russell was a progenitor of William Huntington Russell, Frank Henry Russell, and Frank Ford Russell.
