= Curtiss Cox Racer =

Model 22 Cox Racer
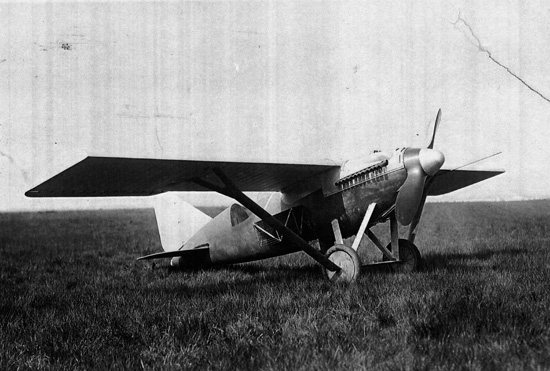
- Texas Wildcat

General information
- Type: Racing aircraft
- National origin: United States
- Manufacturer: Curtiss Aeroplane and Motor Company
- Number built: 2

History
- First flight: 1920

The Curtiss Cox Racers (or Curtiss Model 22s) were two specialised racing aircraft built by the American Curtiss Aeroplane and Motor Company. The type was flown as a monoplane, biplane and triplane.

== Design and development ==
In 1920 the American oil millionaire S.Cox had two specialised racing monoplanes built for him by the Curtiss Aeroplane and Motor Company to take part in the Gordon Bennett Trophy race to be held in France in September 1920. The two aircraft, named Texas Wildcat and Cactus Kitten, were single-engined, braced, high-wing monoplanes powered by a 427 hp (318 kW) Curtiss C-12 inline piston engine. They had streamlined wooden fuselages with the pilot sitting in an enclosed cockpit towards the rear of the fuselage, under a forward sliding canopy. The wing, which had a special double camber airfoil section, was high-mounted, and was braced by struts to the mainwheels of the fixed conventional landing gear. The V-12 engine drove a two-bladed tractor propeller, and was cooled by radiators mounted on the side of the fuselage between the cockpit and the wings.

== Operational history ==
The Texas Wildcat was briefly tested in the United States before shipment, being fitted with a different wing with a more conventional airfoil for operation out of the confined Curtiss Field. First flying on July 25, it demonstrated a speed of 183 mph (295 km/h), with a speed of 215 mph (346 km/h) expected when fitted with the high speed racing wing. Both aircraft were then sent by ship to France, with no testing carried out on the high speed wing and Cactus Kitten unflown before sailing. Texas Wildcat was reassembled at the Morane-Saulnier factory with the high speed wing, but was found to be unstable at high speeds when flown by test pilot Roland Rohlfs. A set of biplane wings were therefore quickly designed and fitted to Texas Wildcat. Texas Wildcat was wrecked in a landing accident when being flown to Étampes prior to the race.

Although the Cactus Kitten was taken to France it remained unflown and was returned to the United States. It was then rebuilt with a set of short-span triplane wings modified from those of a Curtiss 18T, with the enclosed cockpit replaced by a more conventional open cockpit. Thus modified, it was entered into the 1921 Pulitzer Trophy Race, where, flown by Clarence Coombs at an average speed of 170.3 mph (274.1 km/h), it gained second place behind a Curtiss CR piloted by Bert Acosta. It was later sold to the United States Navy as a trainer for high-speed racing aircraft.

== Specifications (Cactus Kitten) ==
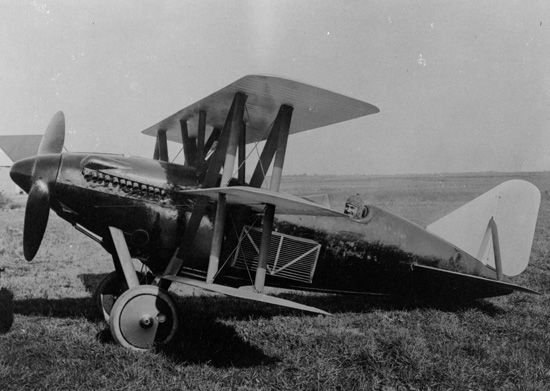
Cactus Kitten

Data from The Second Annual Pulitzer Race at Omaha

General characteristics

- Crew: one
- Length: 19 ft 3 in (5.87 m)
- Wingspan: 20 ft (6.1 m)
- Wing area: 210 sq ft (20 m^{2})
- Airfoil: Curtiss C-27
- Gross weight: 2,406 lb (1,091 kg)
- Powerplant: 1 × Curtiss C-12 liquid-cooled V-12 engine, 435 hp (324 kW)

Performance

- Maximum speed: 196 mph (315 km/h, 170 kn)
