= Pfitzner Flyer =

1910 American experimental aircraft

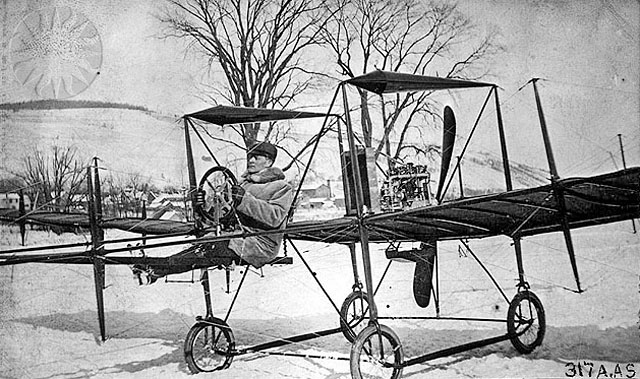

General information
- Type: Experimental pusher monoplane
- National origin: United States
- Manufacturer: Curtiss Aeroplane and Motor Company
- Designer: Alexander Pfitzner
- Primary user: Curtiss Aeroplane and Motor Company
- Number built: 1

History
- First flight: January 1910

The Pfitzner Flyer was an innovative monoplane designed in 1909 by Alexander Pfitzner and built by the Curtiss company at Hammondsport, New York, where Pfitzner was employed at the time.

The Flyer was the first monoplane designed, built and flown in the United States. It incorporated several novel features, the most innovative of which was the method of achieving lateral control by means of reciprocating lateral (telescopic) wing extensions, which the pilot controlled via a steering wheel. Also unusual for a monoplane was the use of a pusher configuration, the engine also being mounted behind the pilot.

The aircraft was not a success, and a disappointed Pfitzner is thought to have died by suicide on 12 July 1910.

== Background ==
Since their success with the first recorded powered flight, the Wright Brothers had patented many of their methods and had sought to enforce their patents through the courts. Most if not all other manufacturers were keen to develop alternative techniques; Pfitzner avoided the Wrights' method of warping the wings to achieve a lift differential between port and starboard wings by using wing extensions (or 'compensators'), described below. In his book “Monoplanes and Biplanes: Their Design, Construction and Operation” (1911), Grover Loening wrote “This aeroplane is a distinct departure from all other monoplanes in the placing of the motor, aviator, and rudders, and in the comparatively simple and efficient method of transverse control by sliding surfaces, applied here for the first time.”. The issue of patent protection was sufficiently in the public eye for The New York Times, in its issue of 16 January 1910, to headline Pfitzner's design as an “Aeroplane Without Patent Drawbacks". The same article refers to the “Wright suits” and their attempts to “build up their patent fences”; Pfitzner is quoted there as saying that “any one who wants to do so is welcome to use [his] panel invention without cost or fear of injunction”.

== Design and development ==
Pfitzner, a “designer of high-class gasoline motors, transmissions, and gears” was employed by Glen Curtiss at his Hammondsport factory. Pfitzner designed his Flyer as a private project but it was constructed in the Curtiss factory.

The aircraft consisted of a rectangular cuboid cross-braced central frame, onto which the main monoplane wing, the motor, the forward and rear booms and the ‘undercarriage’ (consisting of one wheel at each of the lower corners) were mounted. Between the upper front and rear posts of the frame were fitted two streamlined fuel tanks (clearly visible in the image above), one on each side of and above the pilot's seat, with a combined capacity of six gallons (22.7 L.).

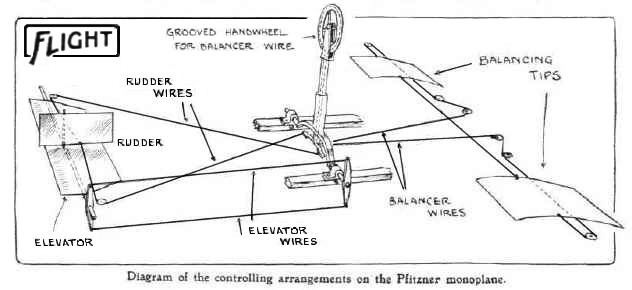
Image first published in Flight Vol. II(11) in 1910, from Flight Global archive

The pilot sat immediately forward of the wing and controlled the aircraft by a combination a movable column and a wheel mounted on that column. Pitch was controlled by fore and aft movement of the column, which, by means of wires, moved the elevator mounted at the forward end of the front boom. Yaw control was effected by twisting the column about its vertical axis (by means of pressure on the steering wheel), which turned the vertical rudder (mounted above the elevator) left or right. Lateral control was achieved by rotating the wheel: When the pilot turned the steering-wheel to port, the linkage (shown below and here) retracted the port wingtip, at the same time extending the starboard extension by the same amount. Thus there was no need for a rudder bar (or pedals); the pilot's feet were not used for controlling the aircraft. Also mounted on the control column was a throttle lever; a button on the wheel enabled "the Bosch high-tension magneto to be switched off for the purpose of switching off the engine". There was a fixed tail-plane surface with an area of 10.5 sq.ft. (0.98 sq.m.) at the end of the rear boom to provide longitudinal stability.

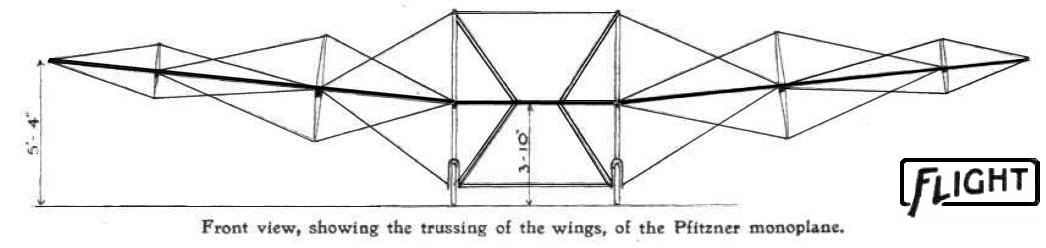
Image first published in Flight Vol. II(11) in 1910, from Flight Global archive

The span of the main wing, which was set at an angle for an incidence of 8°, was 31 ft., with a wingtip extension of 30 in (76 cm) on each wing, providing a constant wingspan of 33 ft. 6 in. (10.21 m). The wing was 6 ft. (1.8 m) wide; the extensible wingtips were 4 ft. 2 in. (1,27 m) wide, each providing a maximum of 10.5 sq. ft. (0.98 sq.m.) wing area. The wing extensions were of the same curvature as the main wing. “The main supporting plane at a 5-deg. dihedral angle consists of two main beams across which are placed spruce ribs. The surface is made of Baldwin vulcanized silk, of jet black color, tacked to the top of the ribs and laced to the frame. The curvature of the surface is slight and is designed for high speed.” The wing ribs had a camber of 3.75 in. (9.05 cm) over 6 ft (1.8 m).

Each of the wings consists of three detachable sections, each 5 ft. (1.5 m.) long, which are supported by steel sockets and steel cable, the latter forming a symmetrical double king truss with the beams, fore and aft pairs of King posts being situated at the junctions of the sections.

== Operational history ==
Pfitzner himself, although an inexperienced flyer at the time, conducted initial test flights with his Flyer, the first taking place in early January 1910. Despite the presence of a light covering of snow at the time, it was reported that the Flyer had made a large number of short flights and that it required an average run of 100 ft. (30 m) to get airborne.

Following Pfitzner's disappearance (and assumed suicide) in July, 1910, Horace K. Kearney took over the aircraft and demonstrated it at aero meets in the succeeding months, including in Boston, before the Pfitzner Flyer became little more than an interesting footnote in the history of aviation.

== Specification ==
Data from

General characteristics

- Crew: 1
- Length: 30 ft (9.1 m)
- Wingspan: 33 ft 6 in (10.21 m) (The main span was 31 ft, with extensions providing additional 2 ft. 6 in.)
- Height: 7 ft (2.1 m)
- Wing area: 196.5 sq ft (18.26 m^{2}) (Area of main wing: 186 sq. ft. (17.3 sq.m.); area of each wingtip extension 10.5 sq. ft.(0.98 sq.m.))
- Aspect ratio: 5.17 : 1
- Gross weight: 430 lb (195 kg) (Gross weight includes 6 gallons of petrol, 1 gallon of oil and 1.5 gallons of water.)
- Max takeoff weight: 600 lb (272 kg)
- Powerplant: 1 × Curtiss 4-cyl. petrol engine, 25 hp (19 kW)
- Propellers: 2-bladed, 6 ft (1.8 m) diameter

Performance

- Maximum speed: 42 mph (68 km/h, 36 kn)
- Wing loading: 3.2 lb/sq ft (16 kg/m^{2})
