= Curtiss Aeroplane and Motor Company =

1916–1929 aircraft manufacturer in the United States

Curtiss Aeroplane & Motor Company, Ltd
- Company type: Public
- Industry: Aerospace
- Predecessor: Curtiss Aeroplane Company; Curtiss Motor Company
- Founded: March 1909; 117 years ago
- Founders: Glenn H. Curtiss
- Defunct: 1929
- Fate: Merged with Wright Aeronautical
- Successor: Curtiss-Wright
- Headquarters: Buffalo, New York, United States
- Number of locations: 3
- Key people: Frank Henry Russell
- Revenue: US$1.566 billion
- Number of employees: 21,000 (1916)
- Parent: Willys-Overland (1917–1920)
- Subsidiaries: Burgess Company (1916–1919); Curtiss Engineering Company (1916–1932)

The Curtiss Aeroplane and Motor Company (1909–1929) was an American aircraft manufacturer originally founded by Glenn Hammond Curtiss and Augustus Moore Herring in Hammondsport, New York. After significant commercial success in its first decades, it merged with the Wright Aeronautical to form Curtiss-Wright Corporation.

== History ==
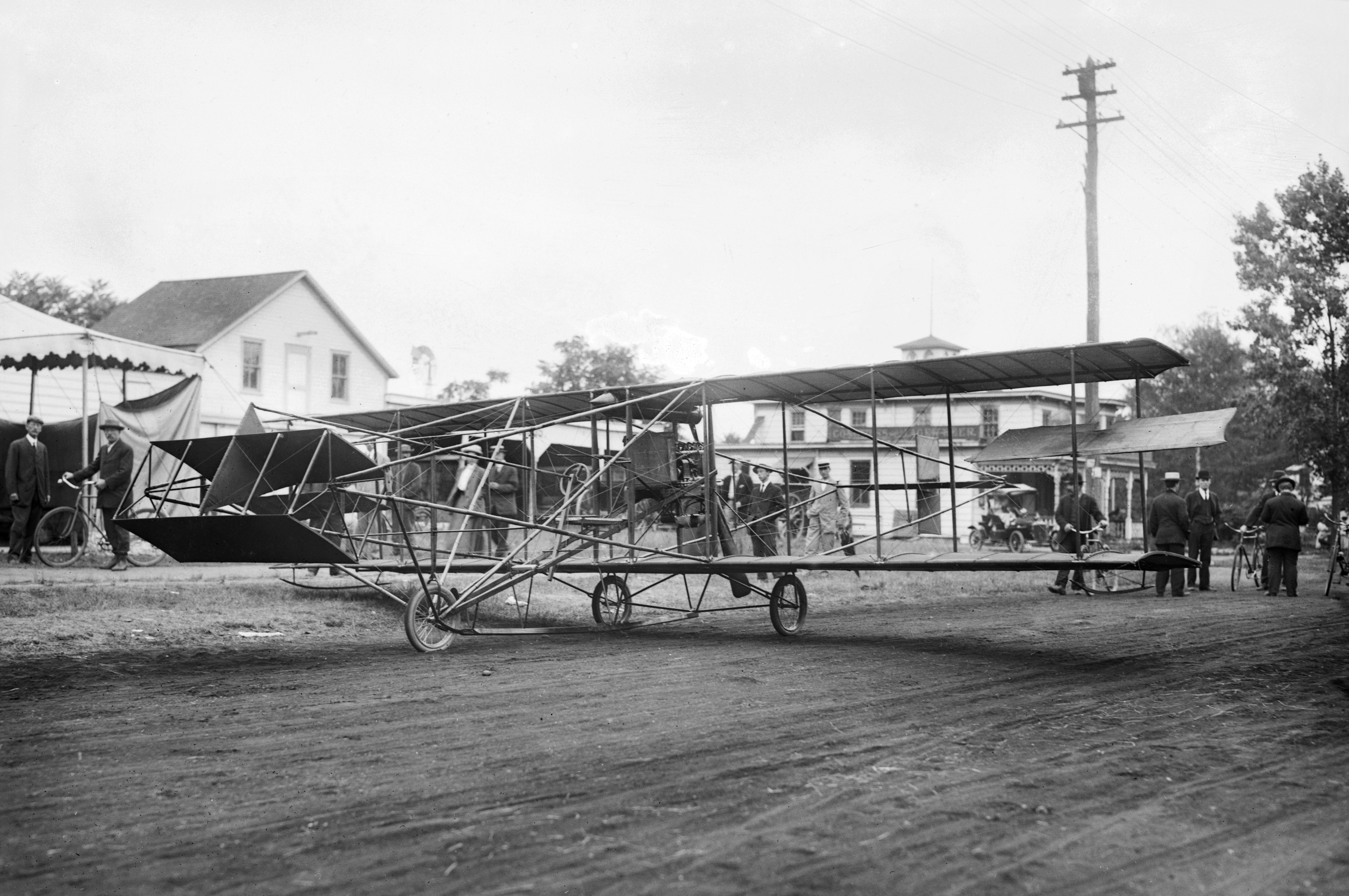
Curtiss-Herring flying machine photographed in Mineola, New York c. 1910s

=== Origin ===
In 1907, Glenn Curtiss was recruited by the scientist Dr. Alexander Graham Bell as a founding member of Bell's Aerial Experiment Association (AEA), with the intent of establishing an aeronautical research and development organization. According to Bell, it was a "co-operative scientific association, not for gain but for the love of the art and doing what we can to help one another."

In 1909, shortly before the AEA was disbanded, Curtiss partnered with Augustus Moore Herring to form the Herring-Curtiss Company. It was renamed the Curtiss Aeroplane Company in 1910 and reorganized in 1912 after being taken over by the Curtiss Motor Company.

=== Curtiss Aeroplane and Motor Company ===
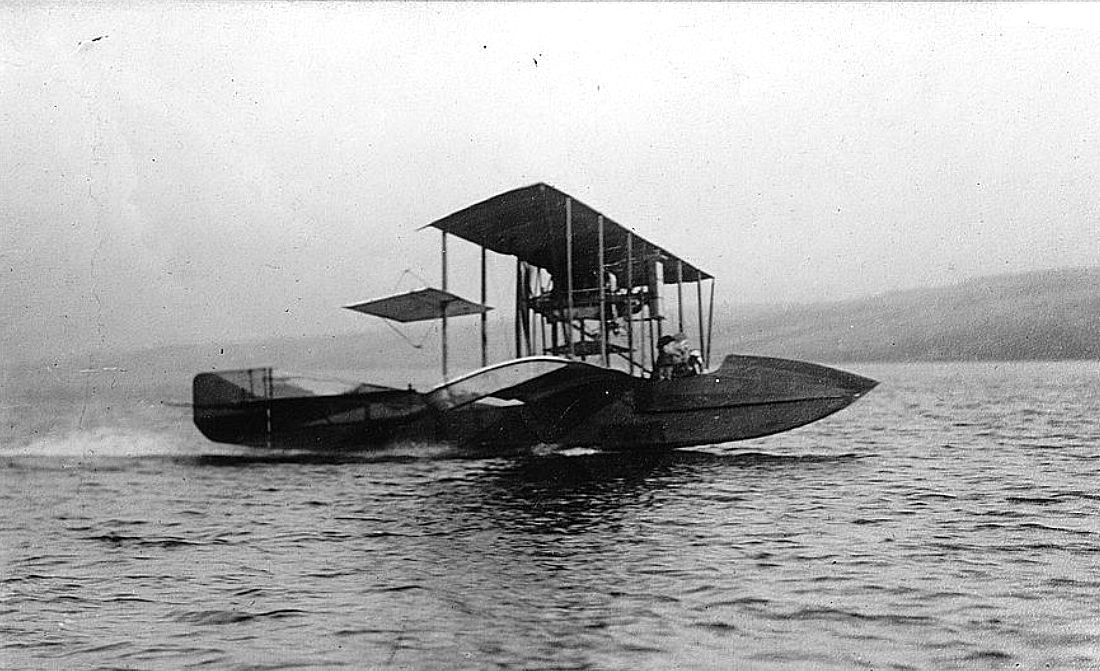
Curtiss flying boat tested on Keuka Lake, New York (c. 1910-1915)

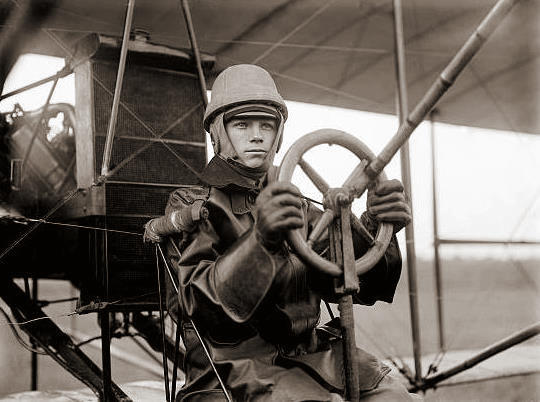
Curtiss military aircraft being tested in College Park, Maryland circa 1912

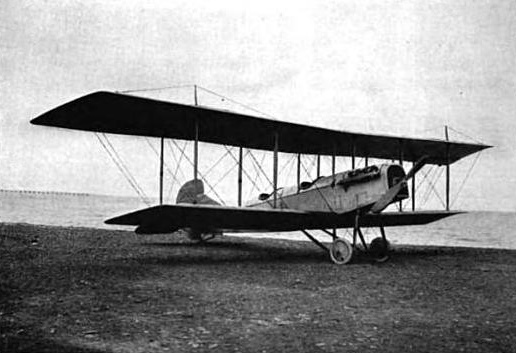
Curtiss 160 hp reconnaissance biplane (1918)

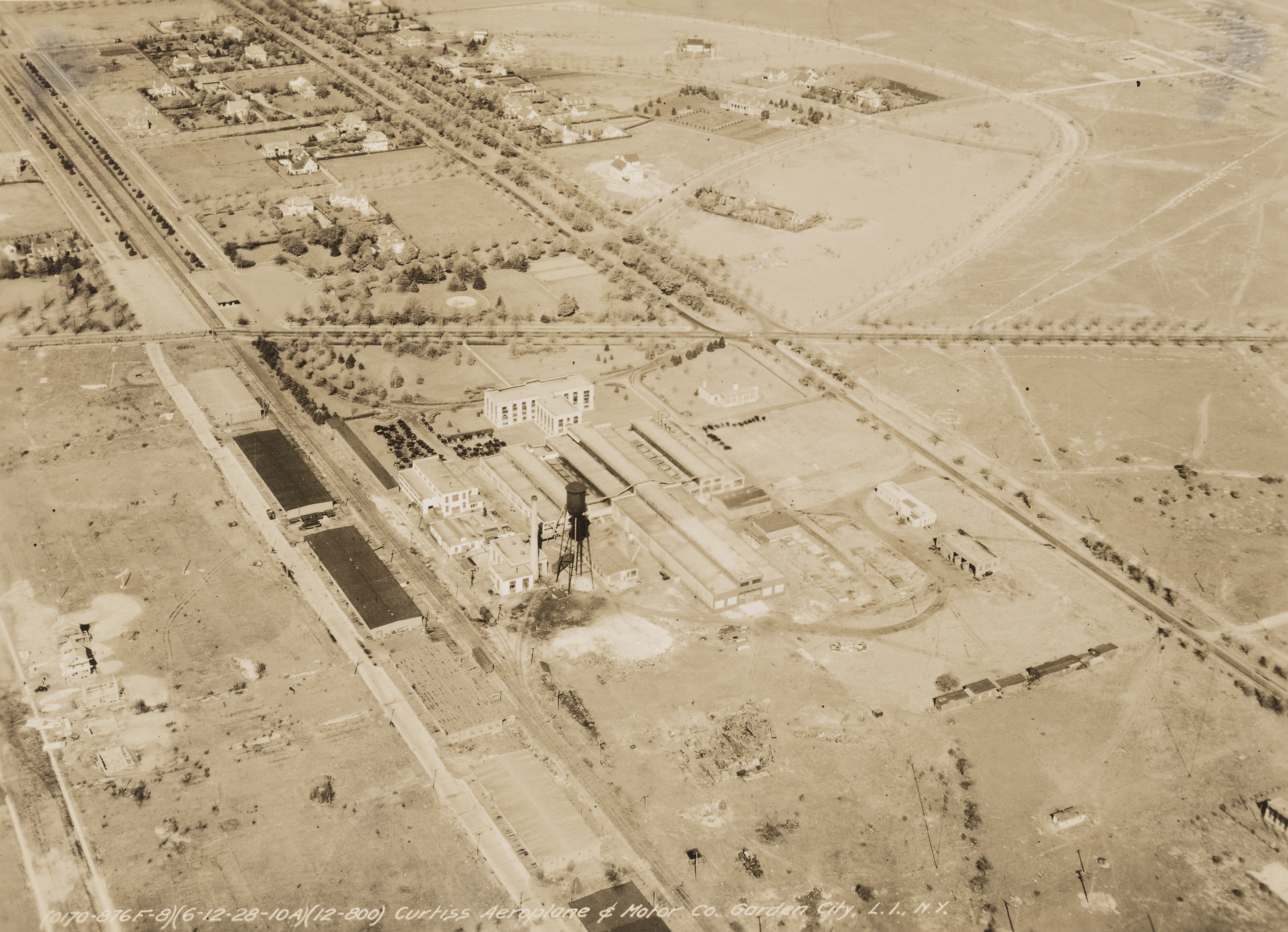
Curtiss Aeroplane factory in Garden City in 1928

The Curtiss Aeroplane and Motor Company was created on January 13, 1916, from the Curtiss Aeroplane Company of Hammondsport, New York, and Curtiss Motor Company of Bath, New York. Burgess Company of Marblehead, Massachusetts, became a subsidiary in February 1916. At the same time, the Curtiss Engineering Company was established as a subsidiary in Garden City, New York. (Note: This plant would operate until 1932. After being used for the Nassau Collegiate Center and leased to the Sperry Gyroscope Company during World War II, the building was eventually sold in 1948.)

With the onset of World War I, military orders rose sharply, and Curtiss needed to expand quickly. In 1916, the company moved its headquarters and most manufacturing activities to Buffalo, New York, where there was far greater access to transportation, manpower, manufacturing expertise, and much needed capital. The company housed an aircraft engine factory in the former Taylor Signal Company-General Railway Signal Company. An ancillary operation was begun in Toronto, Ontario, that was involved in both production and training, setting up the first flying school in Canada in 1915.

Up to 1917, the two major aircraft patent holders, the Wright Company and the Curtiss Company, had fought the Wright brothers patent war. This effectively blocked the building of new airplanes which were desperately needed as the United States was entering World War I. The U.S. government, as a result of a recommendation of a committee formed by Franklin D. Roosevelt, then Assistant Secretary of the Navy, pressured the industry to form a cross-licensing organization (in other terms a Patent pool), the Manufacturer's Aircraft Association. Later that year, Curtiss was acquired by the automobile manufacturer Willys-Overland.

Curtiss was instrumental in the development of U.S. Naval Aviation by providing training for pilots and providing aircraft. The first major order was for 144 various subtypes of the Model F trainer flying boat. In 1914, Curtiss had lured B. Douglas Thomas from Sopwith to design the Model J trainer, which led to the JN-4 two-seat biplane trainer (known affectionately as the "Jenny").

The Curtiss Aeroplane and Motor Company worked with the United States' British and Canadian allies, resulting in JN-4 (Can) trainers (nicknamed the "Canuck") being built in Canada. In order to complete large military orders, JN-4 production was distributed to five other manufacturers. After the war, large numbers of JN-4s were sold as surplus, making influential as the first plane for many interwar pilots, including Amelia Earhart. A stamp was printed to commemorate the Curtiss JN-4, however a printing error resulted in some having the aircraft image inverted, which has become very valuable, and one of the best known rare stamps, even being featured in a number of movies.

The Curtiss HS-2L flying boat was used extensively in the war for anti-submarine patrols and was operated from bases in Nova Scotia, France, and Portugal. John Cyril Porte of the Royal Navy and Curtiss worked together to improve the design of the Curtiss flying boats resulting in the Curtiss F5L and the similar Felixstowe F.3. Curtiss also worked with the United States Navy to develop the NC-4, which became the first aircraft to fly across the Atlantic Ocean in 1919, making several stops en route. By the end of World War I, the Curtiss Aeroplane and Motor Company would claim to be the largest aircraft manufacturer in the world, employing 18,000 in Buffalo and 3,000 in Hammondsport, New York. Curtiss produced 10,000 aircraft during that war, and more than 100 in a single week.

Peace brought cancellation of wartime contracts. In September 1920, the Curtiss Aeroplane and Motor Company underwent a financial reorganization and Glenn Curtiss cashed out his stock in the company for $32 million and retired to Florida. He continued as a director of the company but served only as an advisor on design. Clement M. Keys gained control of the company from Willys-Overland and it later became the nucleus of a large group of aviation companies.

Curtiss seaplanes won the Schneider Cup in two consecutive races, those of 1923 and 1925. The 1923 race was won by U.S. Navy lieutenant David Rittenhouse flying a Curtiss R3C to 177.266 miles per hour (285.282 km/h). Piloted by U.S. Army Lt. Cyrus K. Bettis, a Curtiss R3C won the Pulitzer Trophy on October 12, 1925, at 248.9 miles per hour (400.6 km/h). Thirteen days later, Jimmy Doolittle won the Schneider Trophy in the same aircraft fitted with floats with a top speed of 232.573 miles per hour (374.290 km/h).

The Curtiss Robin light transport was first flown in 1928, becoming one of the company's biggest sellers during the Great Depression, and the 769 built helped keep the company solvent when orders for military aircraft were hard to find.

=== Curtiss-Wright Corporation ===
On July 5, 1929, Curtiss Aeroplane and Motor Company together with 11 other Wright and Curtiss affiliated companies merged to become the Curtiss-Wright Corporation. One of the last projects started by Curtiss Aeroplane was the ambitious Curtiss-Bleecker SX-5-1 Helicopter, a design that had propellers located midpoint on each of the four large rotors that drove the main rotors. This design, while costly and well engineered, was ultimately a failure.

=== Curtiss Aviation School ===
Curtiss also operated a flying school at Long Branch Aerodrome in Toronto Township, Ontario, from 1915 to 1917 before being taken over by the Royal Flying Corps Canada.

=== Atlantic Coast Aeronautical Station ===
Glenn H. Curtiss sponsored the Atlantic Coast Aeronautical Station on a 20-acre tract east of the Newport News boat harbor in the Fall of 1915 with Captain Thomas Scott Baldwin as head. Many civilian students, including Canadians, later became famed World War I flyers. Victor Carlstrom, Vernon Castle, Eddie Stinson and General Billy Mitchell trained here. The school was disbanded in 1922.

== Products ==
=== Aircraft ===
| Model name | First flight | Number built | Type |
|---|---|---|---|
| Curtiss No. 1 | 1909 | 1 | Experimental single engine biplane |
| Curtiss No. 2 | 1909 | 1 | Experimental single engine biplane |
| Pfitzner Flyer | 1910 | 1 | Experimental single engine monoplane |
| Curtiss Model D | 1910 | | Single engine biplane |
| Curtiss Model E | 1911 | | Single engine biplane floatplane |
| Curtiss Model F | 1912 | 150+ | Single engine biplane flying boat |
| Curtiss Model J | 1914 | 2 | Single engine biplane trainer |
| Curtiss Model H | 1914 | 478 | family of classes of long-range flying boats |
| Curtiss Model K | 1915 | 51+ | Single engine biplane flying boat |
| Curtiss Model R | 1915 | ~290 | Single engine biplane utility plane |
| Curtiss C-1 Canada | 1915 | 12 | Twin engine biplane bomber |
| Curtiss JN-4 | 1915 | 6,813 | Single engine biplane trainer |
| Curtiss Model L | 1916 | 4+ | Single engine triplane trainer |
| Curtiss Model N | 1916 | 560 | Single engine biplane floatplane trainer |
| Curtiss Model T | 1916 | 1 | Four engine triplane flying boat patrol bomber |
| Curtiss Twin JN | 1916 | 8 | Twin engine biplane observation airplane |
| Curtiss HS | 1917 | ~1,178 | Single engine biplane flying boat patrol airplane |
| Curtiss GS | 1918 | 6 | Single engine biplane floatplane scout |
| Curtiss HA | 1918 | 6 | Single engine biplane fighter/mailplane |
| Curtiss JN-6H | 1918 | 1,035 | Single engine biplane trainer |
| Curtiss NC | 1918 | 10 | Four engine biplane flying boat patrol airplane |
| Curtiss 18 | 1918 | 8 | Single engine biplane/triplane fighter |
| Curtiss Eagle | 1919 | ~24 | Three engine biplane airliner |
| Curtiss Oriole | 1919 | | Single engine biplane |
| Curtiss Cox Racer | 1920 | 2 | Single engine monoplane/biplane/triplane racer |
| Curtiss CR | 1921 | 4 | Single engine biplane racer |
| Curtiss CT | 1921 | 1 | Twin engine biplane torpedo bomber |
| Curtiss Orenco D | 1921 | 50 | Single engine biplane fighter |
| Curtiss P-1 Hawk | 1923 | 107 | Single engine biplane fighter |
| Curtiss CS | 1923 | 83 | Single engine biplane torpedo bomber |
| Curtiss R2C | 1923 | 3 | Single engine biplane racer |
| Curtiss R3C | 1925 | 3 | Single engine biplane racer |
| Curtiss Carrier Pigeon | 1925 | 12 | Single engine biplane mailplane |
| Curtiss F6C Hawk | | 75 | Single engine biplane fighter |
| Curtiss F7C Seahawk | 1927 | 17 | Single engine biplane fighter |
| Curtiss Falcon | | 488 | Single engine biplane observation/attack airplane |
| Curtiss Fledgling | 1927 | ~160 | Single engine biplane trainer |
| Curtiss Robin | 1928 | 769 | Single engine cabin monoplane |
| Curtiss Tanager | 1929 | 1 | Experimental single engine cabin biplane |
| Curtiss Thrush | 1929 | 13 | Single engine cabin monoplane |
| Curtiss Kingbird | 1929 | 19 | Twin engine monoplane airliner |
| Curtiss XO-30 | N/A | 0 | Unbuilt twin engine monoplane observation plane |
| Curtiss P-6 Hawk | | 70 | Single engine biplane fighter |
| Curtiss XP-10 | | 1 | Prototype single engine biplane fighter |
| Curtiss XP-18 | N/A | 0 | Unbuilt single engine biplane fighter |
| Curtiss XP-19 | N/A | 0 | Unbuilt single engine monoplane fighter |
| Curtiss YP-20 | | 1 | Prototype single engine biplane fighter |
| Curtiss XP-22 Hawk | | 1 | Prototype single engine biplane fighter |
| Curtiss PN-1 | | 1 | Prototype single engine biplane night fighter |
| Curtiss B-2 Condor | | 13 | Twin engine biplane bomber |
| Curtiss Model 41 Lark | | 3 | Single engine biplane floatplane |
| Curtiss Model S | | ~8 | Single engine biplane/triplane fighter |
| Curtiss Autoplane | | 1 | Roadable aircraft |
| Curtiss F5L | | 60 | Twin engine biplane flying boat |
| Curtiss TS | | 34 | Single engine biplane fighter |

=== Aircraft engines ===
- Curtiss A-2 (engine)
- Curtiss OX-5
- Curtiss OXX
- Curtiss C-6
- Curtiss D-12 (Curtiss V-1150)
- Curtiss K-12
- Curtiss V-2
- Curtiss V-1570 Conqueror
- Curtiss H-1640 Chieftain
- Curtiss R-600 Challenger
- Curtiss R-1454

=== Helicopters ===
- Curtiss-Bleecker SX-5-1 Helicopter

== See also ==
- Alfred V. Verville

| Preceded by Curtiss Aeroplane Company | Curtiss Aeroplane and Motor Company; 1916–1929 | Succeeded by Curtiss-Wright Corporation |
