= Curtiss Twin JN =

American observation aircraft

Curtiss Twin JN (JN-5, Model 1B)
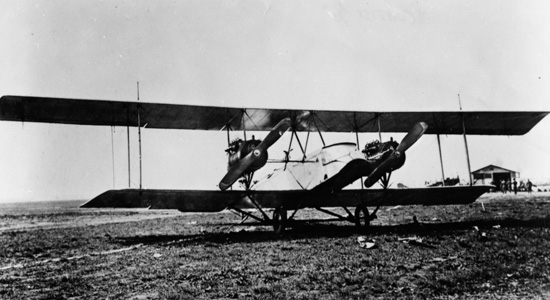

General information
- Type: Experimental biplane observation aircraft
- Manufacturer: Curtiss
- Primary user: United States Army Air Service
- Number built: 8

History
- Introduction date: 1916
- Developed from: Curtiss JN Jenny

The Curtiss Twin JN (retrospectively called the Model 1B and also known as the JN-5) was an experimental aircraft built by the Curtiss Aeroplane and Motor Company for the United States Army Air Service. It was a biplane, designed for observation missions.

Based on the successful Curtiss JN-4, the Twin JN used the same wing structure, but the wingspan was extended by enlarging the center section. Lateral control was achieved with the tail of a Curtiss R-4. The Twin JN was powered by a pair of 90 hp (67 kW) Curtiss OXX-2 engines located between the wings.

One aircraft was evaluated by the United States Navy as a twin-float seaplane.

== Operators ==
United States

- United States Army Air Service
- United States Navy

== Specifications ==
Data from Curtiss Aircraft 1907–1947

General characteristics

- Crew: two
- Length: 29 ft 0 in (8.83 m)
- Wingspan: 52 ft 9.38 in (16.08 m)
- Height: 10 ft 8.38 in (3.26 m)
- Wing area: 450.3 sq ft (41.83 m^{2})
- Empty weight: 2,030 lb (921 kg)
- Gross weight: 3,110 lb (1,411 kg)
- Powerplant: 2 × Curtiss OXX-2 water-cooled V-8 water-cooled aircraft piston engine , 90 hp (67 kW) each

Performance

- Maximum speed: 85 mph (136 km/h, 74 kn)
- Service ceiling: 11,000 ft (3,350 m)
- Rate of climb: 400 ft/min (2.0 m/s)

== See also ==
Related lists

- List of military aircraft of the United States
- List of aircraft of the Royal Flying Corps
