= Frank Ford Russell =

- Born: August 1904; Grand Mere, Quebec, Canada
- Died: 1969; New York, NY, USA
- Known for: Leadership in aviation and collegiate wrestling

Frank Ford Russell (1904-1969) was the son of Frank Henry Russell. He was an intercollegiate wrestling champion for Yale University and was elected captain of its wrestling team in 1924. He was posthumously inducted into the Eastern Intercollegiate Wrestling Association Hall of Fame. Russell also rowed with the famed Yale Eight crew that won the 1924 Olympics (see Rowing at the Olympics,) although his wrestling schedule ultimately forestalled participation in the Olympic campaign. He was a member of the Skull and Bones Society.

He was graduated from Yale in 1926 and after a short stint on Wall Street, entered the aviation business, avoiding work with any company associated with his father to avoid presumptions of nepotism. By the end of the 1930s, he was President of National Aviation Corporation. During World War II, Russell was one of the "Dollar-A-Year" men who left lucrative professions to work for that nominal amount in support of America's war effort. He served as President of the National Aviation War Production Council. The Council was an adjunct to the War Production Board specifically tasked with coordinating aircraft production.

Later Russell resumed his business career as president, later chairman, of Cerro Corporation. He was a director of Bell Aviation, Otis Elevator, the Chase Manhattan Bank, Lockheed Inc., Glen L. Martin Co., Worthington Corporation, and National Sulfur Corp. He was a trustee of Milton Academy and president of the Independent School League.
