= Curtiss-Bleecker SX-5-1 Helicopter =

Experimental American helicopter

Curtiss-Bleecker Helicopter
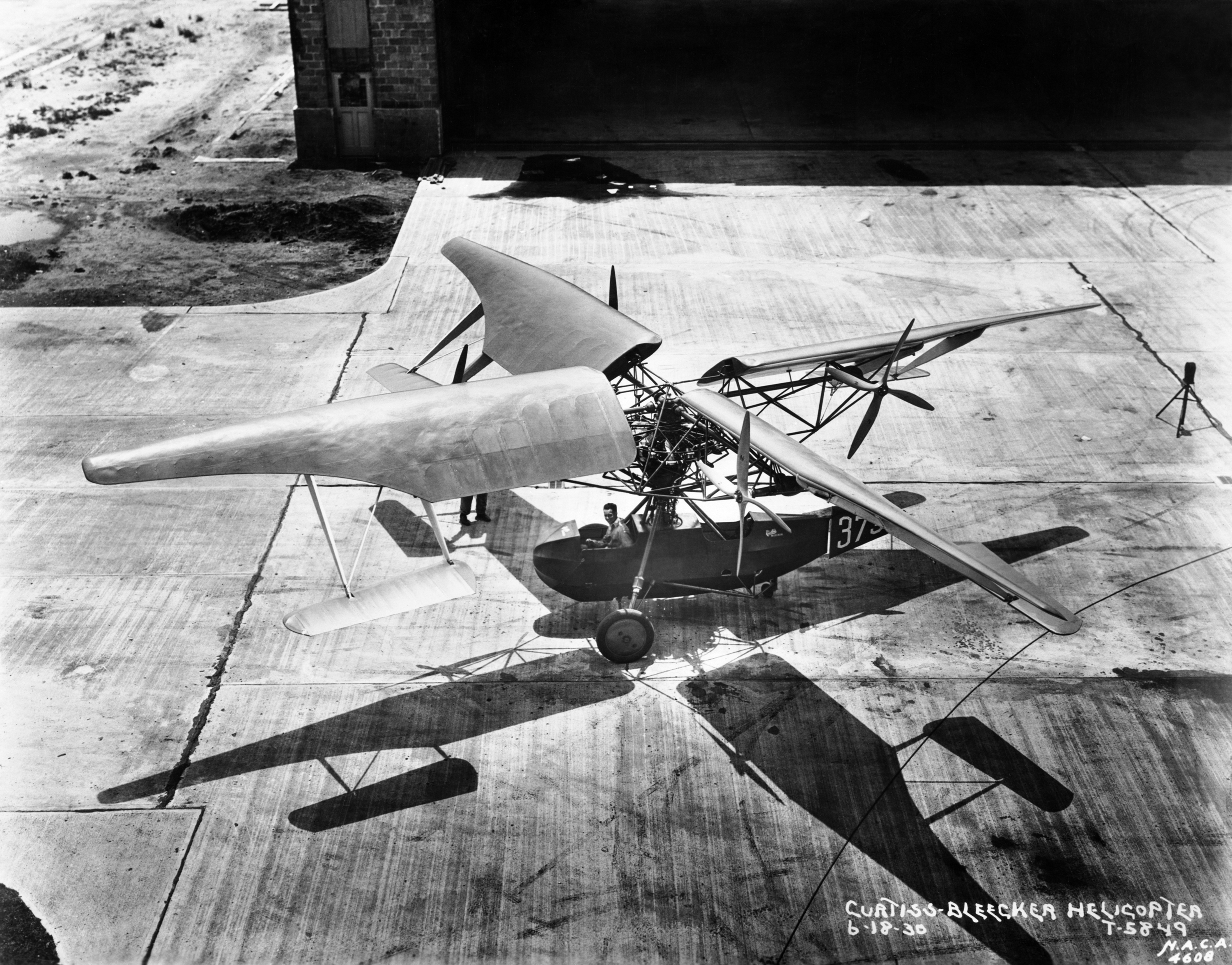

General information
- Type: Helicopter
- National origin: United States
- Manufacturer: Curtiss Aeroplane and Motor Company
- Designer: Maitland B. Bleecker
- Number built: 1

History
- First flight: 1926

The Curtiss-Bleecker Helicopter was an American prototype rotary wing aircraft, introduced in 1926. The thrust of the aircraft was distributed from a central mounted engine through shafts to propellers mounted on each rotor blade.

== Design and development ==
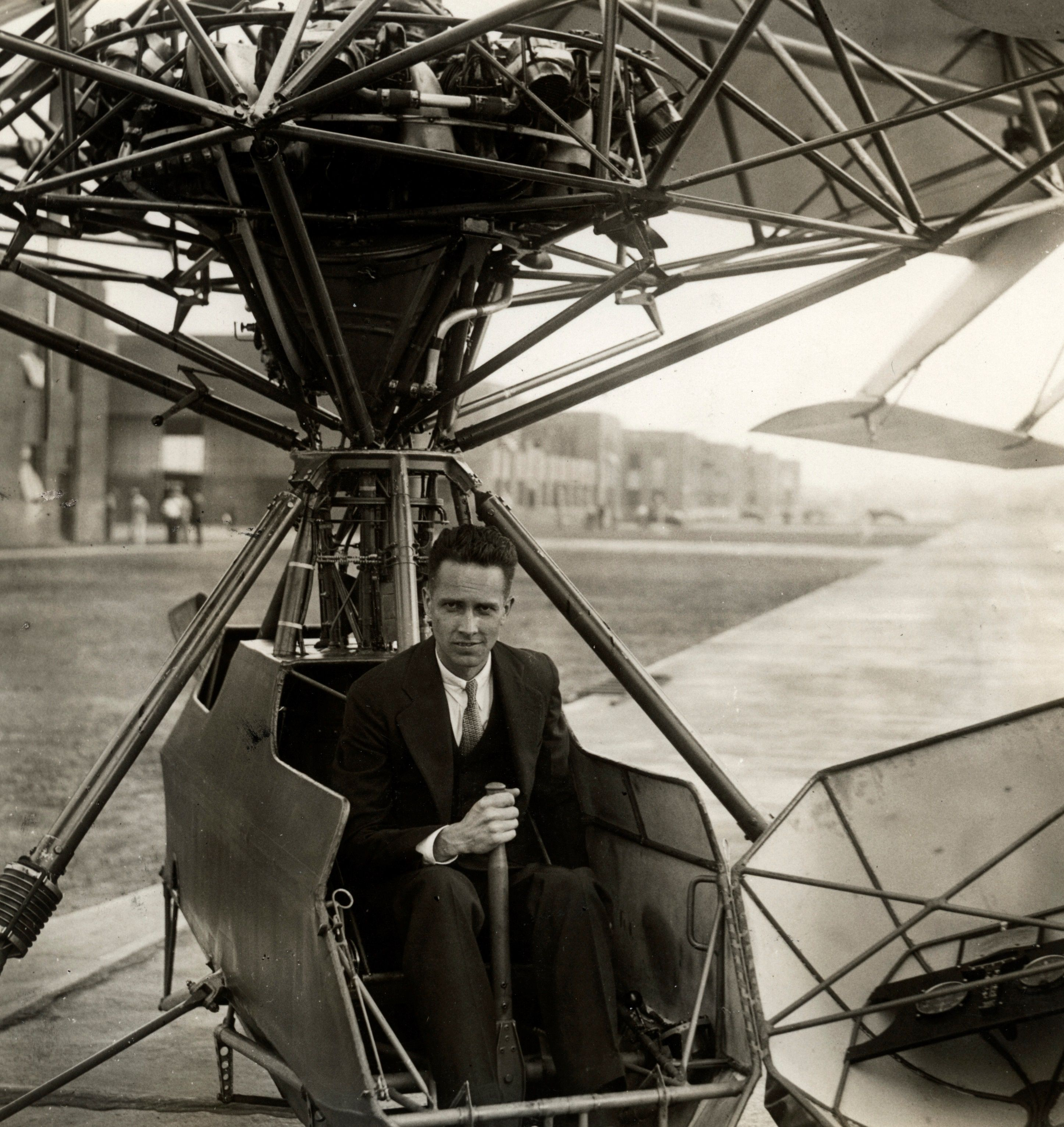
Maitland B. Bleeker at the controls during development

The Bleecker Helicopter was designed by Maitland B. Bleecker, a junior engineer from the National Advisory Committee for Aeronautics. The aircraft was constructed by Curtiss Wright for $250,000 over the course of four years at Garden City.

The aircraft featured a rotary wing design with a single engine. Each rotor, painted silver and yellow, had an individual propeller for thrust and a trailing control surface called a "stabovator" to change pitch of the rotor. The aircraft was controlled by a stick that operated like a modern helicopter collective control. Yaw was controlled with a "spin vane" that used downwash from the rotor to pivot the aircraft with foot pedals.

== Operational history ==
Testing on the Bleecker Helicopter was stopped after the failure of a drive shaft on a test flight in 1929. By 1933 the project was abandoned following vibrational issues in further tests.

== Specifications ==
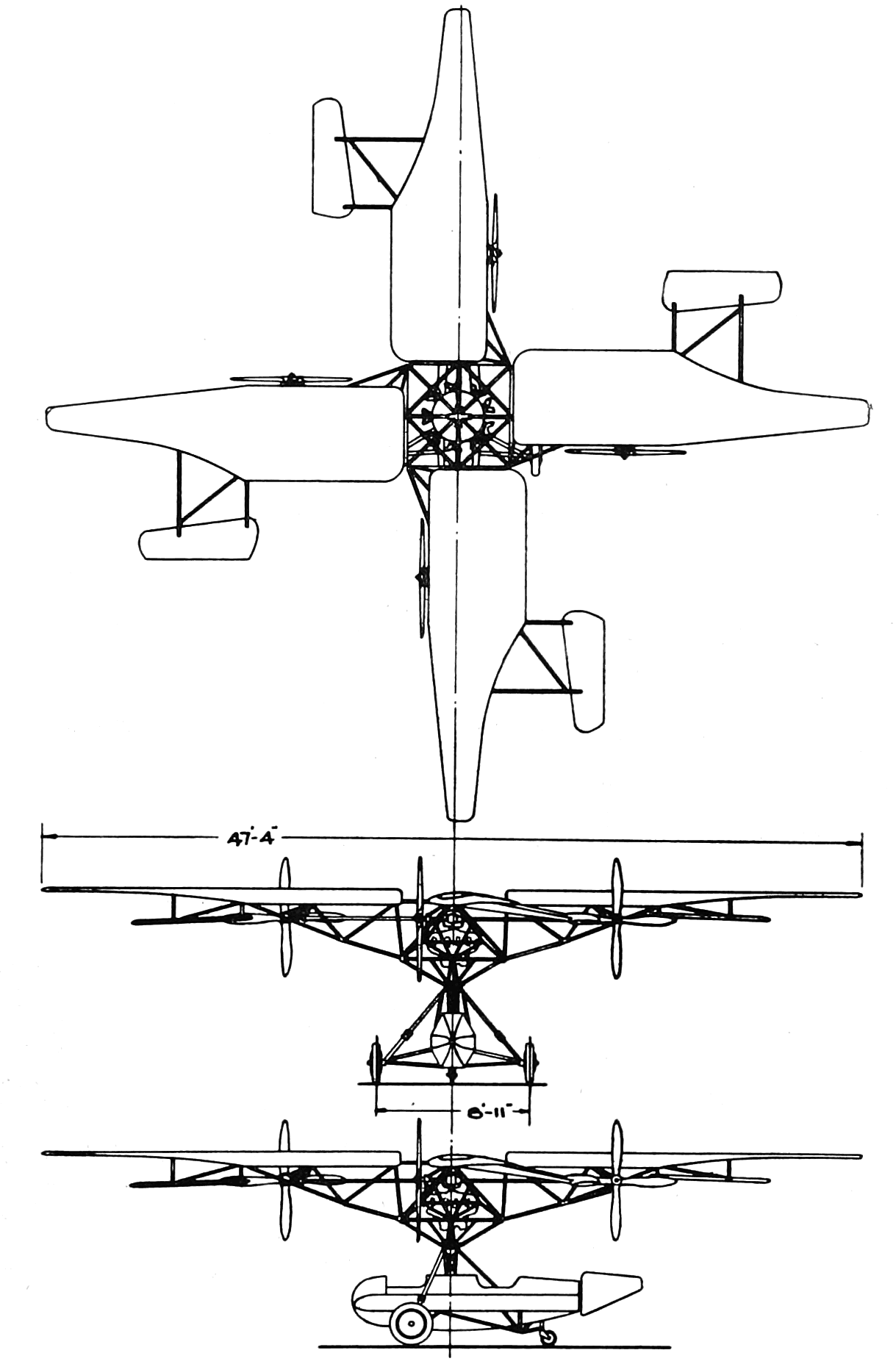
Curtiss-Bleecker helicopter 3-view drawing from Aero Digest, July, 1930

Data from NASA

General characteristics

- Capacity: 2
- Wing area: 370 sq ft (34 m^{2}) Area of rotor blades
- Empty weight: 2,800 lb (1,270 kg)
- Gross weight: 3,400 lb (1,542 kg)
- Fuel capacity: 30 US gallons (114 litres)
- Powerplant: 1 × Pratt & Whitney R-1340 Wasp radial piston, 420 hp (310 kW)

Performance

- Maximum speed: 70 mph (110 km/h, 61 kn)
- Rate of climb: 1,000 ft/min (5.1 m/s)
