= Wright brothers patent war =

Airplane flight control patent dispute

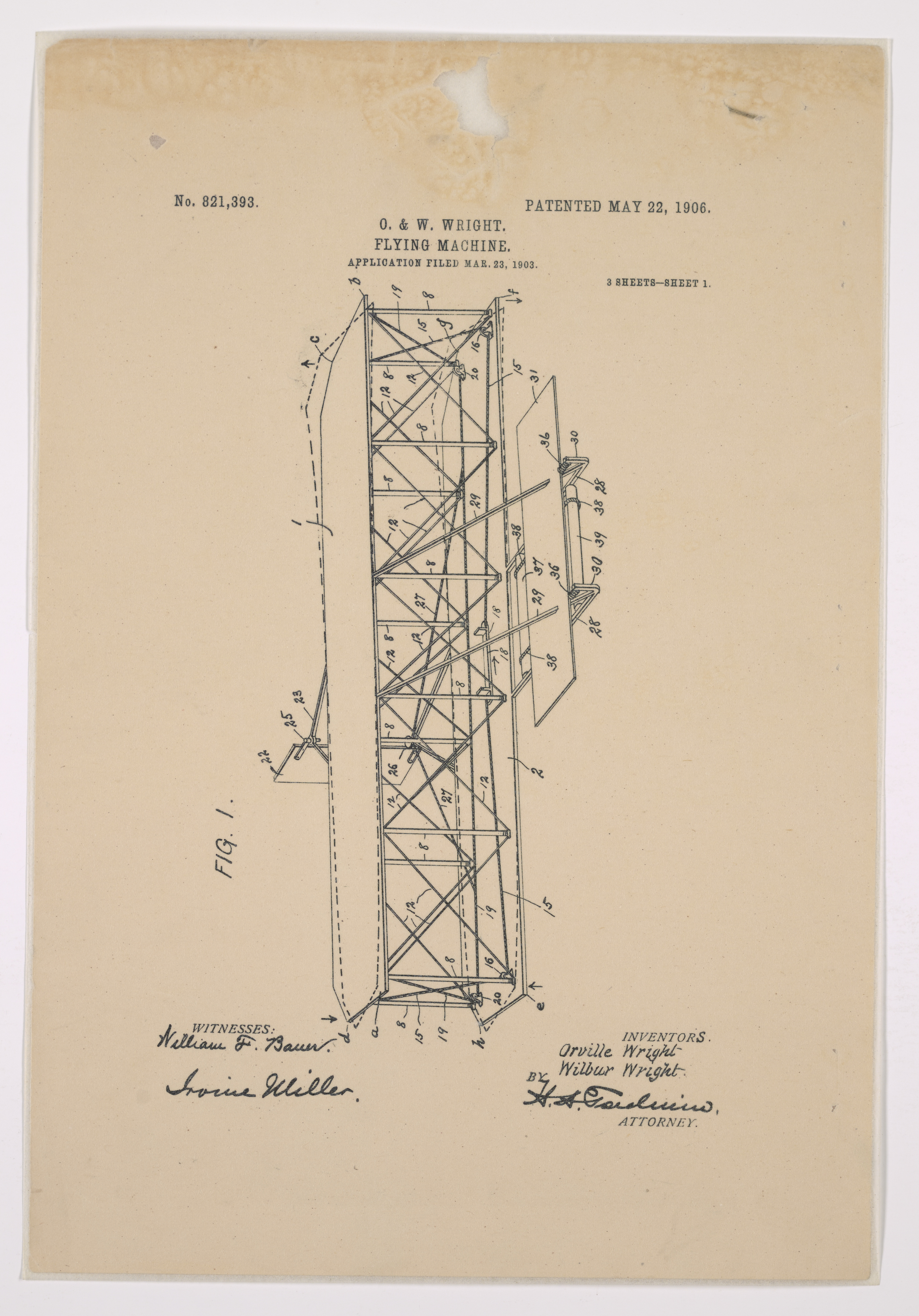
Oblique view of the airplane - Wright 1906 Patent

The Wright brothers patent war centers on the patent that the Wright brothers received for their method of aircraft flight control. They were two Americans who are widely credited with inventing and building the world's first flyable airplane and making the first controlled, powered, and sustained heavier-than-air human flight on December 17, 1903.

In 1906, the Wrights received a U.S. patent for their method of flight control. In 1909, they sold the patent to the newly-formed Wright Company in return for $100,000 in cash, 40% of the company's stock, and a 10% royalty on all aircraft sold. Investors who contributed $1,000,000 to the company included Cornelius Vanderbilt, Theodore P. Shonts, Allan A. Ryan, and Morton F. Plant. That company waged a patent war, initially in an attempt to secure a monopoly on U.S. aircraft manufacturing. Unable to do so, it adjusted its legal strategy by suing foreign and domestic aviators and companies, especially another U.S. aviation pioneer, Glenn Curtiss, in an attempt to collect licensing fees.

In 1910, they won their initial lawsuit against Curtiss, when Federal Judge John Hazel ruled:

It further appears that the defendants now threaten to continue such use for gain and profit, and to engage in the manufacture and sale of such infringing machine, thereby becoming an active rival of complainant in the business of constructing flying-machines embodying the claims in suit, but such use of the infringing machine it is the duty of this Court on the papers presented to enjoin.

Of the nine suits brought by them and three against them, the Wright brothers eventually won every case in U.S. courts. Even after Wilbur Wright had died, and Orville Wright had retired in 1916 (selling the rights to their patent to a successor company, the Wright-Martin Corp.), the patent war continued, and even expanded, as other manufacturers launched lawsuits of their own—creating a growing crisis in the U.S. aviation industry.

Many historians believe the patent war stalled development of the U.S. aviation industry, but others dispute this claim. Perhaps as a consequence, airplane development in the United States fell so far behind Europe that in World War I, American pilots were forced to fly European combat aircraft instead. After the war began, the U.S. Government pressured the aviation industry to form an organization to share patents.

== Patent ==
During their experiments in 1902 the Wrights succeeded in controlling their glider in all three axes of flight: pitch, roll and yaw. Their breakthrough discovery was the simultaneous use of roll control with wing-warping and yaw control with a rear rudder. A forward elevator controlled pitch. In March 1903 they applied for a patent on their method of control. The application, which they wrote themselves, was rejected. In early 1904, they hired Ohio patent attorney Henry Toulmin, and on May 22, 1906, they were granted US Patent 821,393 for a "Flying Machine".

The patent's importance lies in its claim of a new and useful method of controlling a flying machine, powered or not. The technique of wing-warping is described, but the patent explicitly states that it covers "any construction" for adjusting the outer portions of a machine's wings to different angles on the right and left sides to achieve lateral roll control. Court decisions stated that devices like ailerons, which would eventually become the most common method, were included under the patent. The concept of lateral control became essential to successful flight, used by nearly all airplane designs with the exception of some types of ultralight aircraft.

Letters that Wilbur Wright wrote to Octave Chanute in January 1910 offer a glimpse into the Wrights' feeling about their proprietary work:

"It is not disputed that every person who is using this system today owes it to us and to us alone. The French aviators freely admit it." In another letter Wilbur said: "It is our view that morally the world owes its almost universal use of our system of lateral control entirely to us. It is also our opinion that legally it owes it to us."

The broad protection intended by this patent succeeded when the Wrights won patent infringement lawsuits against Glenn Curtiss and other early aviators who used ailerons to emulate lateral control described in the patent and demonstrated by the Wrights in their 1908 public flights. U.S. courts decided that ailerons were also covered by the patent.

== Patent war ==
Wilbur Wright	Orville Wright	Glenn Curtiss

Soon after the Wright brothers demonstrated their airplane, numerous others involved in similar efforts at the time sought to gain credit for their achievements, whether justified or not. As noted in the New York Times in 1910, "a highly significant fact that, until the Wright brothers succeeded, all attempts with heavier-than-air machines were dismal failures, but since they showed that the thing could be done everybody seems to be able to do it." This competition quickly devolved into a patent war including 12 major lawsuits, extensive media coverage and a secret effort by Glenn Curtiss and the Smithsonian Institution to discredit the Wright brothers.

In 1908, the Wrights warned Glenn Curtiss not to infringe their patent by profiting from flying or selling aircraft that used ailerons. Curtiss refused to pay license fees to the Wrights and sold an airplane to the Aeronautic Society of New York in 1909. The Wrights filed a lawsuit, beginning a years-long legal conflict.

They also sued foreign aviators who flew at U.S. exhibitions, including the leading French aviator Louis Paulhan. The Curtiss people derisively suggested that if someone jumped in the air and waved his arms, the Wrights would sue.

European companies, which owned foreign patents the Wrights obtained and licensed to them, sued manufacturers in their countries. The European lawsuits were only partly successful. Despite a pro-Wright ruling in France, legal maneuvering dragged on until the patent expired in 1917. A German court ruled the patent not valid due to prior disclosure in speeches by Wilbur Wright in 1901 and Octave Chanute in 1903.

In the U.S. the Wrights made an agreement with the Aero Club of America to license airshows which the Club approved, freeing participating pilots from a legal threat. Promoters of approved shows paid fees to the Wrights.

The Wright brothers won their initial case against Curtiss in February 1913, but the decision was appealed. The brothers wrote to Samuel F Cody in the UK, making a claim that he had infringed their patents but Cody stated that he had used wing-warping on his man-carrying kites before their flights.

The Wrights' preoccupation with the legal issue hindered their development of new aircraft designs, and by 1910 Wright aircraft were inferior to those made by other firms in Europe. Aviation development in the U.S. was suppressed to such an extent that, when the country entered World War I, no acceptable American-designed aircraft were available, and U.S. forces were compelled to use French airplanes.

This claim has been disputed by researchers Katznelson and Howells, who assert that before World War I "aircraft manufacturers faced no patent barriers." Contemporary and respected observers also supported the Wright brothers. In April 1910 the Christian Science Monitor wrote, "The insistence of Professor Bell upon his rights did not retard the growth in the use of the telephone. Thomas Edison's numerous suits for protection of his inventions have not kept any of them out of the market".

In January 1914, a U.S. Circuit Court of Appeals upheld the verdict in favor of the Wrights against the Curtiss company, which continued to avoid penalties through legal tactics.

In light of these setbacks and to discredit the Wright brothers, Glenn Curtiss in 1914 helped the head of the Smithsonian, Charles Doolittle Walcott, secretly make major modifications to a failed aeroplane built in 1903 by Professor Samuel Langley to make it appear able to fly. After the flight demonstrations, Walcott ordered the Langley machine be restored to its 1903 condition to cover up the deception before it was put on display. It took until 1928 for the Smithsonian Board of Regents to pass a resolution acknowledging that the Wright brothers deserved the credit for "the first successful flight with a power-propelled heavier-than-air machine carrying a man."

Beginning in 2011, Russell Klingaman—a prominent Wisconsin aviation/patent attorney, aviation law journalist, and instructor in Aviation Law at Marquette University Law School—researched, prepared and delivered a series of lectures, at major aviation events and lawyers' organizations, analyzing and decrying the events and outcomes of the Wright-Curtiss lawsuit, citing numerous examples of error or misconduct by various parties to the suit, including attorneys and the judge. Klingaman found that the judge in the case allowed the Wrights' attorney to make his case in a private ("ex-parte") hearing with the judge, without the opposing side present, and discovered other misconduct which he believes led to a legally inappropriate outcome.

== Post-Wright patent battles ==
Some time after Wilbur Wright's death, Orville Wright retired from their company in 1916, and sold his rights in their critical patent, for over $1,000,000, to the Wright-Martin Corporation—which had merged his company with that of fellow aircraft manufacturing pioneer Glenn L. Martin. Anxious to recoup their investment in the Wright patent, the Wright-Martin firm continued the pursuit of patent-infringement battles, and royalty demands, in battles with other planemakers.

At the same time (and in response, some suggest) Glenn Curtiss and his company did the same with their numerous, and arguably important, aviation patents—driving up the cost of American aircraft.

Lawsuits, and lawsuit threats, frightened many would-be aircraft manufacturers out of the business—just as the growing war in Europe stimulated U.S. military demand for aircraft, in anticipation of eventual U.S. involvement in the war. The U.S. Army and Navy were finding it difficult to get aircraft manufacturers to produce enough to meet the military's demand.

In December 1916, Wright-Martin began demanding that other aircraft manufacturers pay a royalty of five percent on each aircraft sold—and meet an annual minimum royalty payment of $10,000 per manufacturer. They demanded that royalty on all aircraft, regardless of whether they achieved differential lifting by then obsolete wing-warping technique of the Wrights, or by the far more popular ailerons also patented in 1906 by the Wright brothers and used by Curtiss.

== Patent pool solution ==
In 1917, the two major patent holders, the Wright Company and the Curtiss Company, had effectively blocked the building of new airplanes in the United States, which were desperately needed for service in World War I. The U.S. government, as a result of a recommendation from the newly established National Advisory Committee for Aeronautics, pressured the industry to form a cross-licensing organization (in other terms a patent pool), the Manufacturer's Aircraft Association.

All aircraft manufacturers were required to join the association, and each member was required to pay a comparatively small blanket fee (for the use of aviation patents) for each airplane manufactured; of that the major part would go to the Wright-Martin and Curtiss companies, until their respective patents expired. This arrangement was designed to last only for the duration of the war, but in 1918 the litigation was never renewed. By this time, Wilbur had died (in May 1912) and Orville had sold his interest in the Wright Company to a group of New York financiers (in October 1915) and retired from the business.

== Aftermath ==
The lawsuits damaged the public image of the Wright brothers, who previously had been generally regarded as heroes. Critics said the brothers' actions may have hampered the development of aviation, and compared their actions unfavorably to European inventors, who worked more openly.

The Manufacturers Aircraft Association was an early example of a government-enforced patent pool. It has been used as an example in recent cases, such as dealing with HIV antiretroviral drug patents to give access to otherwise expensive treatments in Africa.

The Curtiss and Wright organisations merged in 1929 to form the Curtiss-Wright Corporation, which exists to this day.

== Prior art ==
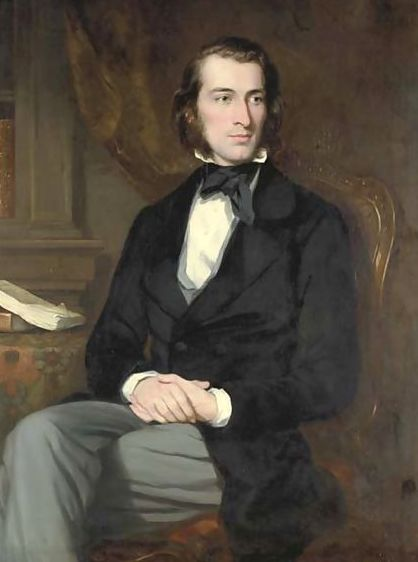
M.P.W. Boulton, the British inventor of ailerons in 1868

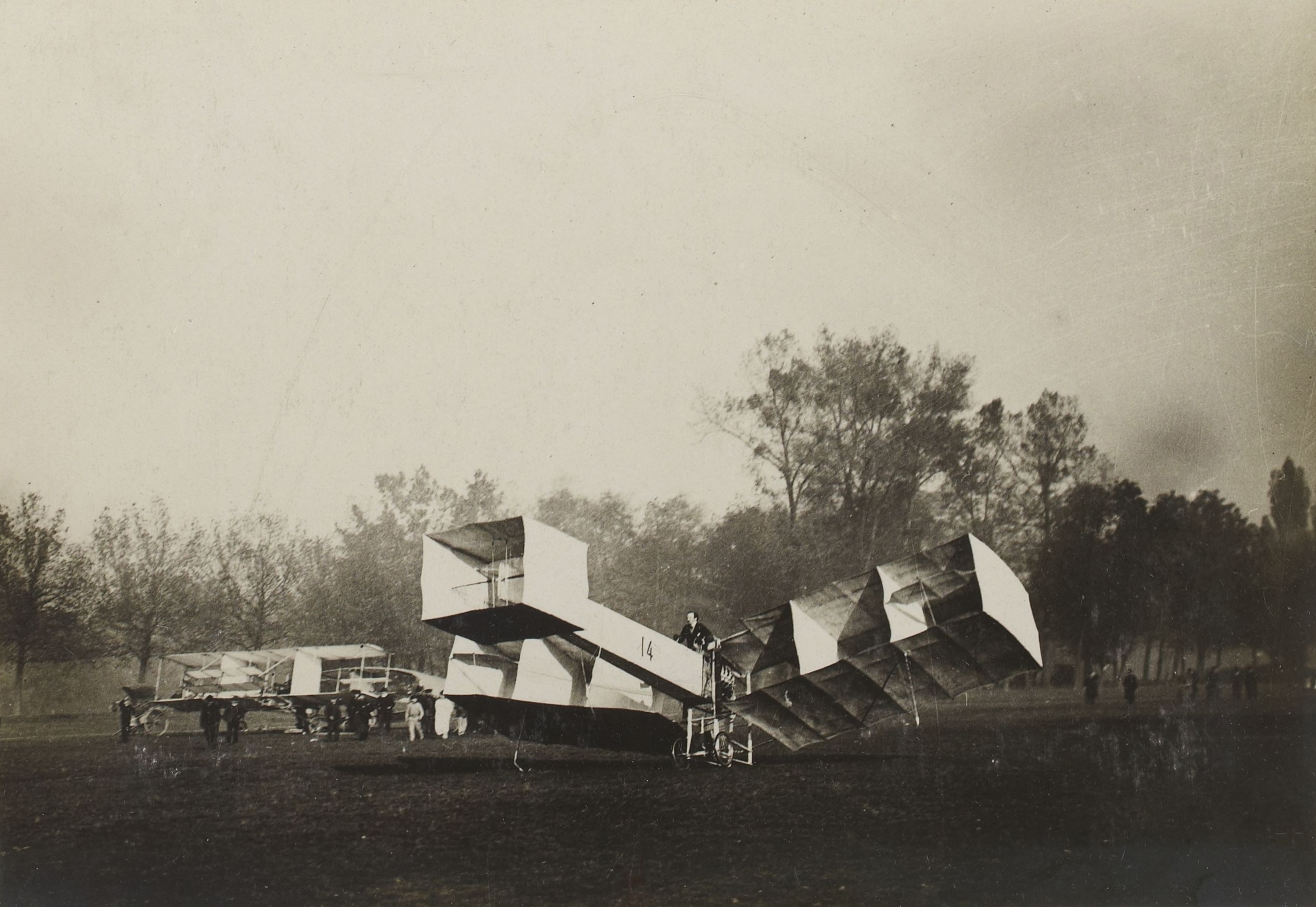
14-bis in November 1906, with its ailerons

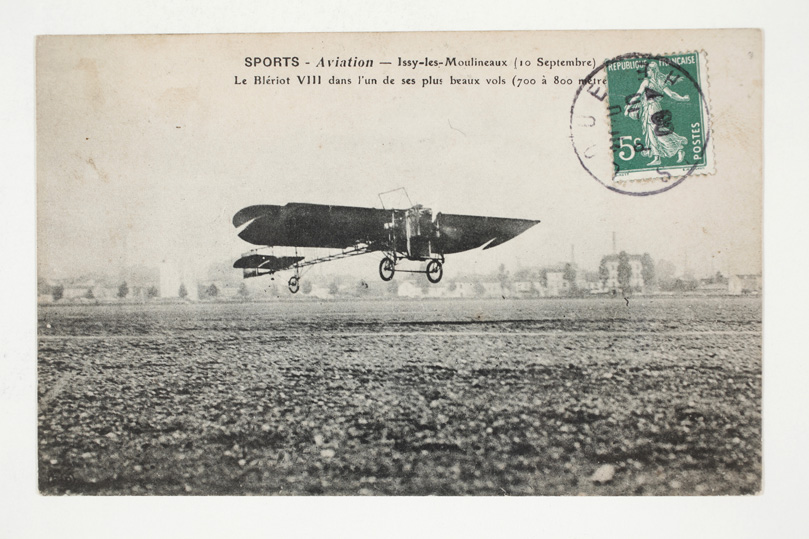
Blériot VIII with wingtip ailerons in September 1908

There are conflicting claims over who first invented the aileron as a method for lateral flight control. In 1868, before the advent of powered, heavier-than-air aircraft — and within eleven years distant in time from the birth of all three of the involved parties in the American lawsuit — English inventor Matthew Piers Watt Boulton first patented ailerons. Boulton's patent, No. 392, awarded in 1868 some 40 years before ailerons were 'reinvented', became forgotten until the aileron was in general use. Aviation historian Charles Gibbs-Smith wrote in 1956 that if Boulton's ailerons had been revealed at the time of the Wright brothers' patent filings, the brothers might not have been able to claim priority of invention for lateral control of flying machines. U.S. District Judge John R. Hazel, who heard the Wright lawsuit against Curtiss, found to the contrary, ruling in 1913 that Boulton's "assertions and suggestions were altogether too conjectural to teach others how to reduce them to practice, and therefore his patent is not anticipatory."

American John J. Montgomery invented and experimented with controllable spring-loaded trailing edge "flaps" on his second glider (1885) for roll control. Roll control was later expanded on his third glider (1886) to rotation of the entire wing as a wingeron. Later, Montgomery independently devised a system for wing warping, using model gliders first and then man-carrying machines with wing warping as early as 1903 through 1905 such as those used on The Santa Clara glider (1905). Montgomery patented this system of wing warping at precisely the same time as the Wrights, and was routinely requested during the middle of the Wright brothers patent war to make the Montgomery patent available more broadly to other aviators for the specific purpose of avoiding the Wright brothers' patent.

New Zealander Richard Pearse may have made a powered flight in a monoplane that included small ailerons as early as 1902, but his claims are controversial (and sometimes inconsistent), and, even by his own reports, his aircraft were not well controlled.

Robert Esnault-Pelterie, a Frenchman, built a Wright-style glider in 1904 that used ailerons in lieu of wing-warping. Although Boulton had described and patented ailerons in 1868, no one had actually built them until Esnault-Pelterie's glider, almost 40 years later.

The Santos-Dumont 14-bis canard biplane was modified to add ailerons in late 1906, though it was never fully controllable in flight, likely due to its unconventional surfaces arrangement. The Blériot VIII, the first aircraft to ever use what became the modern joystick and rudder "bar"-based aircraft flight control system, used wingtip ailerons for its roll control in its flights in France in 1908. Henri Farman's single-acting ailerons on the Farman III of April 1909 were the first to resemble ailerons on modern aircraft, and have a reasonable claim as the ancestor of the modern aileron.

In 1908, U.S. inventor, businessman and engine builder Glenn Curtiss flew an aileron-controlled aircraft. Curtiss was a member of the Aerial Experiment Association, headed by Alexander Graham Bell. The Association developed ailerons for their June Bug aircraft, in which Curtiss made the first officially recognized kilometer-plus flight in the U.S. In 1911, the AEA's version of ailerons received a patent.

== See also ==
- Patent troll
- Aileron
- Bleriot VIII, the first aircraft design (1908) to essentially use the complete aircraft flight control system still used today
- Elevator (aeronautics)
- Selden patent and ALAM, major parties of another vehicular technology patent lawsuit of the same time period
- Frederick Perry Fish
