= Alexander Pfitzner =

Hungarian-American engineer, inventor and aviation pioneer

Alexander (Sandor) L. Pfitzner
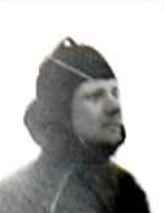
- Born: 5 August 1880; Csete, Austria-Hungary (present-day Hungary)
- Died: c. 12 July 1910 (aged 29); Marblehead, Massachusetts, US
- Occupations: Engineer, aviator

Alexander (Sandor) L. Pfitzner (5 August 1880 – c. 12 July 1910) was a Hungarian engineer, inventor and aviation pioneer. After studying at the Hungarian University of Technology and serving in the Hungarian Army as an artillery officer, he emigrated to the United States, where he pursued a career as a designer of automobile and aircraft engines. He designed and flew the first American monoplane, the Pfitzner Flyer. Apparently depressed by its lack of success, he is reported to have died by suicide in July 1910, although his body was never found. Following his death, reports spread that some of his friends had sighted him in New York City.

== Birth and early career ==
Pfitzner was born in 1880 in Csete, Hungary. He attended the Hungary University of Technology before joining the Hungarian Army, serving as a Lieutenant in an artillery regiment before emigrating to the United States in the early years of the 20th century.

== Engines ==
Pfitzner worked for several automobile manufacturers before starting with the Curtiss Aeroplane and Motor Company. He designed and built the gasoline engine with which Curtiss won the overall speed event in 1909 Gordon Bennett Cup in Rheims, France.

== Aviation pioneer ==
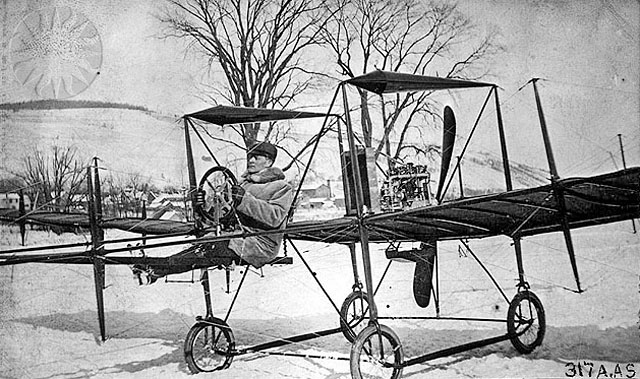
Pfitzner Flyer

Frustrated by the efforts of the Wright Brothers' use of the courts to dominate the developing market for powered flight, Pfitzner designed his own aircraft, the Pfitzner Flyer, which avoided the Wrights' method of warping the wings to achieve a lift differential between port and starboard wings by using wing extensions (or 'compensators'). In his book "Monoplanes and Biplanes: Their Design, Construction and Operation" (1911), Grover Loening wrote "This aeroplane is a distinct departure from all other monoplanes in the placing of the motor, aviator, and rudders, and in the comparatively simple and efficient method of transverse control by sliding surfaces, applied here for the first time". The issue of patent protection was sufficiently in the public eye for the "New York Times", in its issue of 16 January 1910, to headline Pfitzner's design as an "Aeroplane Without Patent Drawbacks". The same article refers to the "Wright suits" and their attempts to "build up their patent fences"; Pfitzner is quoted there as saying that "any one who wants to do so is welcome to use [his] panel invention without cost or fear of injunction".

The performance of his monoplane "Flyer" disappointed Pfitzner. In 1910 he joined the Burgess Company at Marblehead, Massachusetts, where he worked on the design of a biplane which also employed his sliding wing-tip principle. This aircraft was destroyed in a crash in 1910.

Although Pfitzner is no longer a household name, the May 22, 1910, edition of the New York Sun wrote "besides the Wright Brothers, the only other aviators in this country are Curtiss, Williard, Dr. Greene, Hamilton and Pfitzner".

== Death ==
Pfitzner is reported to have been depressed by his lack of success; on July 12, 1910, he rowed out into Marblehead Harbour with a suitcase containing his drawings. The otherwise empty boat was found a few days later with his hat, coat and a recently used revolver, but Pfitzner's body was never found. In September 1910, rumours were reported that some of his friends had seen him in New York.

== See also ==
- List of people who disappeared
