= Harry Aubrey Toulmin Sr. =

American lawyer (1858-1942)

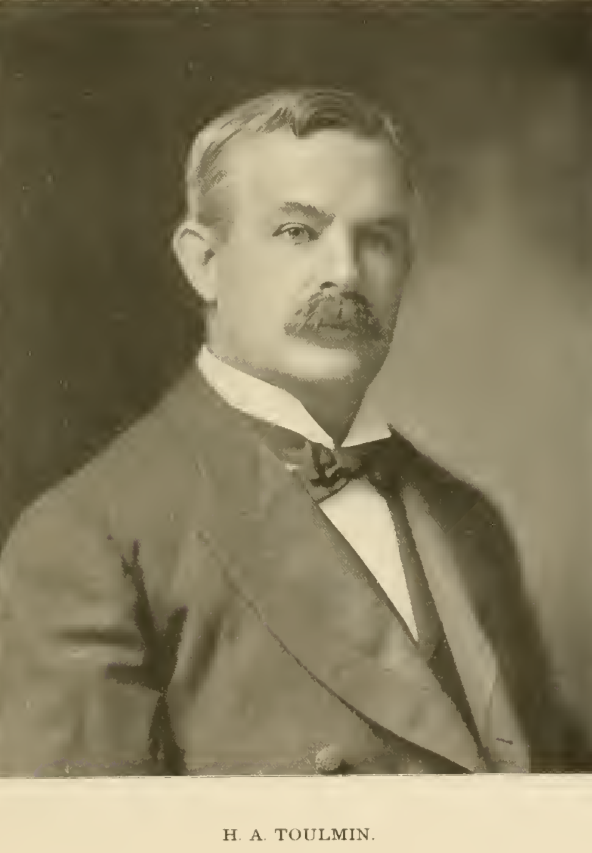
- Born: January 1, 1858
- Died: May 17, 1942 (aged 84)
- Occupation: Patent attorney
- Spouse: Rosamond Evans (d. 1947)
- Children: Harry Aubrey Toulmin Jr. (1890–1965)
- Parent(s): Joshua Morton S. Toulmin (1823–1896); Frances Hellen (1828–1916)

Harry Aubrey Toulmin Sr. (1858 – May 17, 1942) was the American lawyer located in Springfield, Ohio, who wrote the "flying machine" patent application that resulted in the patent granted to Dayton inventors Wilbur and Orville Wright on May 22, 1906.

== Early life ==
Not much is known about Toulmin's early years. Born in 1858 to Joshua Morton S. Toulmin (1823–1896) and Frances Hellen (1828–1916), Toulmin had four brothers and three sisters. In 1882 at age 24, Toulmin graduated from The George Washington University Law School. For the next four years after graduating from law school, Toulmin practiced patent law in Washington, D.C.

== Before the hiring ==
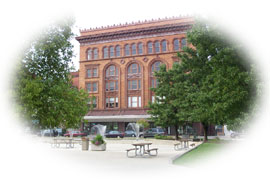
Springfield, Ohio: Fountain Square and the Bushnell Building as they appeared before the installation of the Harry A. Toulmin Sr. Memorial Sculpture.

Toulmin arrived in Springfield, Ohio from Washington D.C. in 1886 because it was a center of innovation and invention that required legal representation for patent proceedings. He set up his law firm in the Bushnell Building located at 14 East Main Street in Springfield. In 1888, Toulmin married Rosamond Evans (d. 1947); they had two children who lived past infancy: Morton Warwick Evans and Harry Aubrey Toulmin Jr. (1890–1965). When Harry Aubrey Toulmin Jr. joined the law firm, his father renamed the firm Toulmin & Toulmin.

== The hiring ==
Applying for a U.S. Patent on their flying machine was never far from the Wrights' minds. Their first attempt to get a patent on their invention failed, largely because they wrote the patent application themselves. Also contributing to its demise was their inability to demonstrate a "practical flying machine." At that time, the U.S. Patent Office had begun to receive a flood of patent applications for aerial craft of all descriptions, real and imagined, and had adopted a policy of only approving applications for inventions involving flying machines if the benchmark of "practicality" could be met and demonstrated. The practicality benchmark has long since been discarded by the U.S. Patent Office as being unworkable.

Following the U.S. Patent Office examiner's advice for the brothers to work with a patent attorney, Wilbur began searching for a qualified lawyer. Two friends, John Kirby and Will Ohmer, recommended that Wilbur contact Toulmin.

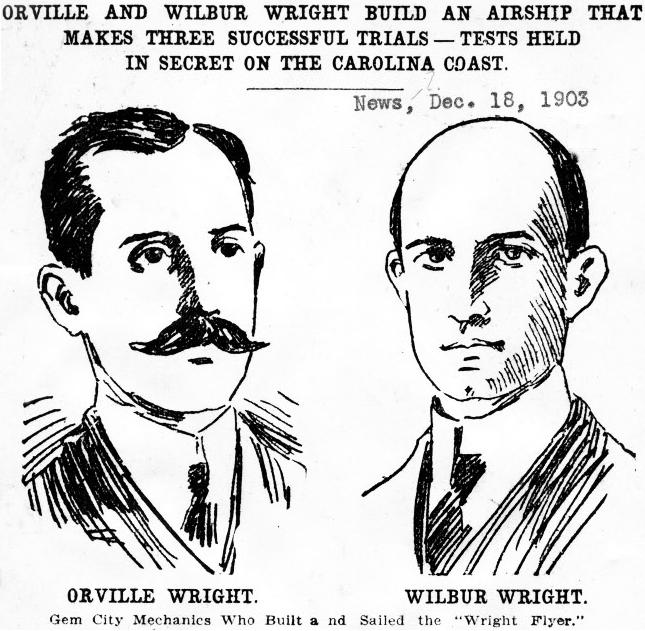
Drawings of the Wright Brothers one day after their famous December 17, 1903 flight

On January 14, 1904, Wilbur Wright wrote to Toulmin for an appointment for advice and assistance with filing a new application. Eight days later, on January 22, Wilbur traveled to Springfield, Ohio, to see Toulmin. Toulmin took Wilbur and Orville seriously when they came to announce that they wanted to patent a flying machine. The Wright brothers hired Toulmin that day and placed the Wright patent case in his hands.

Toulmin was confident that he could use the original application as a starting point for a broad, airtight patent that would protect the brothers' invention. But he warned Wilbur and Orville that the process would be lengthy, and he recommended that they keep quiet about the details of their aircraft. Based on Toulmin's direction, the Wrights decided on secrecy until their patent was secured, during which time they continued to work at building a real, practical machine.

Toulmin urged that the Wrights not seek a patent on their aircraft but only on its system for in-air control. They followed his recommendation that they apply for a patent based on the three-axis control system of their 1902 Glider instead of their powered 1903 or 1904 Flyers in order to avoid having to present a working model to a highly doubting Patent Office. In addition, Toulmin advised the Wrights to patent not just the mechanisms that allowed them to warp or flex a wing but, more importantly, to patent the idea of roll control itself.

Toulmin was able to interpret the Wrights' complex laboratory and field work down to their essential breakthrough. Wilbur walked into Toulmin's office wanting to patent an airplane and walked out wanting to patent only the control system. According to Wilbur, he and Orville immediately liked Toulmin and his services.

Partly Printed Check filled out to H.A. Toulmin and signed by "Wright Cycle Co./W.W." in Dayton, Ohio, May 11, 1907.

Orville and/or Wilbur would travel to Springfield by the interurban streetcar from Dayton to meet with Toulmin at the Patent Law Office of Toulmin & Toulmin. After their initial meeting, Wilbur met Toulmin thirteen days later on February 4, 1904 to discuss foreign patent applications, while Orville and Charlie Taylor started constructing three new engines to replace the 1903 engine wrecked beyond repair after the end of the fourth flight of December 17, 1903 at Kitty Hawk.

On June 21, 1907, Orville journeyed to Springfield, Ohio, to consult Toulmin regarding a new patent on a device for maintaining automatic stability in an airplane. Orville made a second trip on June 26. It is also known that on January 20, 1908 and June 15, 1908 Orville traveled to Springfield to consult Toulmin on Wright patents.

== The patent ==
Partly Illustration of patent no. 821,393, the Wright flying machine patent prepared by Toulmin.

The patent application Toulmin drew up gave the Wrights sole claim to the only system ever devised for the in-air control of a fixed-wing flying machine. By April 1904, the Wrights' patent had been filed not only in the United States but in Britain, France, Belgium, Germany, Austria, Italy, and, Wilbur wrote, "probably Russia." The U.S. patent issued in 1906.

Claim 1 of the patent reads: In a flying-machine, a normally flat aeroplane having lateral marginal portions capable of movement to different positions above or below [sic] the normal plane of the body of the aeroplane, such movement being about an axis traverse to the line of flight, whereby said lateral marginal portions may be moved to different angles relative to the normal plane of the body of the aeroplane so as to present to the atmosphere different angles of incidence, and means for so moving said lateral marginal portions, substantially described.

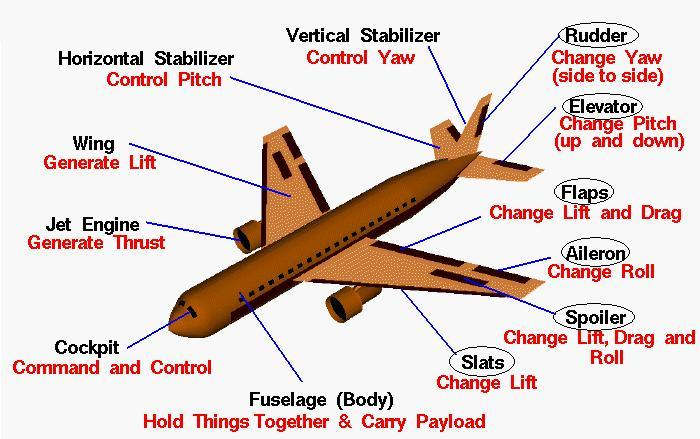
The circled airplane parts above are what Toulmin's patent covered and the Wright Brothers are credited as inventing.

On deciphering the patent legalese, it becomes apparent that Toulmin did not patent the airplane. Rather, Toulmin patented airplane (flying-machine) wing edges (lateral marginal portions) that normally are flat but may move up and down in a direction that is different from the airplane's line of flight and may be moved to different angles. Although the patent particularly addressed a solid wing with a portion of the wing (the marginal portions) being flexed (warped) to provide lift, the patent claim was not so limiting.

Toulmin's patent covered plane motion.

In particular, Toulmin's genius as a patent attorney predicated and helped the Wright Brothers patent slats, the spoiler, the aileron, the flaps, the elevator, and the Rudder for an airplane (see picture above). Without these, an airplane cannot be controlled any more than a car can be controlled without movable wheels. Without a license to the Wright brothers' patent, it was not legally possible to build or fly a controllable airplane in the early 20th century. Unsurprisingly, the verbal and legal attacks by competitors on the Wright Brothers began almost immediately.

== After the patent ==
Patent litigation was a costly endeavor. In a January 22, 1910 letter to Wilbur, Toulmin suggested that the most economical way for the Wright brothers to proceed would be to enter into a retainer agreement with Toulmin & Toulmin, paying US$12,000 (about US$132,000 in 2006 inflation-adjusted dollars) for the first two years and US$10,000 per year (US$110,000 inflation adjusted to 2006) for the subsequent five. This would permit Toulmin to devote his full attention to the Wright brothers litigation, he suggested. Even though the amounts requested were reasonable, it took the Wright brothers only two days to reject that proposal. It may have been money that ended the relationship between Toulmin and the Wright brothers.

In April 1910, Toulmin issued a statement saying that attacks on the Wright brothers was wholly unjustified.

By 1911 Toulmin's prized clients were operating the world's first aircraft factory and the world's first flight-training school while fighting an armful of patent-infringement suits.

On February 13 and 15, 1911, William Joseph Hammer, consulting engineer, and James W. See, mechanical engineer, gave depositions that were taken at the office of H. A. Toulmin, Dayton, Ohio.

On January 9–10, 1912. Wilbur and Orville give depositions in Dayton in Erastus E. Winkley v. Orville & Wilbur Wright lawsuit. Testimony was given on the conception of their patent no. 1,075,533, filed by Toulmin on February 10, 1908. Several drawings used for their patent application and correspondence with Katharine Wright and Harry A. Toulmin regarding it are introduced into the record.

=== Later in life ===
Toulmin handled five patent applications for the Wright brothers over a period of 17 years, spurring more than 13 years of fierce legal battles over the intellectual property rights he helped to create. As a result of Toulmin's success in keeping others from using the Wright brothers' ideas, aircraft manufacturers established the Manufacturers Aircraft Association to coordinate the World War I wartime aircraft manufacturing in the United States and formed a patent pool four months after the United States joined the war, in July, 1917, with the approval of the U.S. government. All patent litigation ceased automatically and royalties were reduced to one percent and free exchange of inventions and ideas took place among all the airframe builders. Toulmin channeled his success and notoriety into authoring more than 30 books on a wide variety of topics, including the Truman Committee of President Harry S. Truman. Several of Toulmin's books were published well after his death in 1942.

== History's view ==
Toulmin was a pioneer patent lawyer who assisted the Wright brothers in the creation of the age of flight. In honor of the patent's centennial anniversary and the 101st anniversary of the last flight of the 1905 Wright Flyer, commemorative groups in Dayton and Springfield, Ohio on October 5, 2006, distributed a commemorative booklet (see above images) and unveiled the Harry A. Toulmin Sr. Memorial Sculpture on downtown Springfield's Fountain Square, across from the restored Bushnell Building where Toulmin maintained his office. The 8-foot (2.4 m) sculpture, a bronze work by artist Michael Major, received a ceremonial flyover by a replica of the 1911 Wright model B. The Bushnell Building is recognized as part of Ohio's National Road Scenic Byway for its being the place where Toulmin helped the Wrights acquire patents for their flying machine. The Harry Toulmin Room in the Bushnell Building seats 50 people.

The collection of Wilbur's and Orville Wright's papers in the Library of Congress includes significant correspondence with the Wrights' lawyers concerning their business affairs, including Toulmin, as well as lawyers Frederick P. Fish, H. Springmann, and Pliny W. Williamson.

== Legacy ==
In 1852, Toulmin's father-in-law, Warwick Evans, was the first medical school graduate from Georgetown University Medical Center, in 1852. Evans went on to become an anatomy professor and prominent physician.

In 1888, Toulmin Sr. married Rosamond Evans (d. 1947); they had two children: Morton Warwick Evans and Harry Aubrey Toulmin Jr. (1890–1965). Toulmin Jr. graduated from Wittenberg University in Ohio and the University of Virginia School of Law. Following in his father's footsteps, Toulmin Jr. became a patent attorney and joined his father's law firm, renamed Toulmin & Toulmin. To distinguish the two, Toulmin Sr. was known by family and close friends as Aubrey "Aircraft" and Toulmin Jr. was known as "Lawyer" Harry. There are no living descendants of Harry Aubrey Toulmin Sr.

Eventually, the Toulmin & Toulmin law firm moved to the Schwind Building, in Dayton, Ohio (a building which played a role in the Dayton Woman's Suffrage Association and subsequently became the Moraine Embassy Apartments). Among Toulmin & Toulmin's clients was the Tucker Corporation, and the firm name appears on the design patent covering Preston Tucker's design for the Tucker Sedan.

Like many patent attorneys, Toulmin Jr. eventually began working as an in-house lawyer for a corporation. In April 1947, Toulmin Jr. was elected the chairman of the board of the Tucker Corporation. Five months later, on September 26, 1947, Harry A. Toulmin Jr. resigned as chairman of the board from the Tucker Corporation in a letter to the U.S. Securities and Exchange Commission (SEC). This letter contributed to the SEC investigation of Preston Tucker and the demise of the Tucker Corporation.

Harry Jr. was a prolific inventor. Over 200 patents in a wide field of technologies were issued to him. Toulmin Jr. went on to form Central Pharmaceuticals Inc.

At the time of his death in 1965, Toulmin Jr. left his shares in his company, Central Pharmaceuticals Inc., worth $1 million at the time, in a trust fund to be managed by his widow, Virginia B. Toulmin. By the terms of the trust, the balance at the time of Virginia's death was to be transferred to Georgetown University Medical Center in honor of Harry Toulmin Jr.'s grandfather Warwick Evans. Georgetown University is the rival school of George Washington University, the school where Harry Toulmin Sr. received his law degree.

Mrs. Toulmin took control of Central Pharmaceuticals as president and built Central into a thriving drug manufacturer. In 1995, Mrs. Toulmin sold Central Pharmaceuticals for $178 million to the German pharmaceutical giant Schwarz Pharma.

The Toulmin trusts were the subject of substantial legal problems. Both Toulmin Sr. and Toulmin Jr. had testamentary trusts, and some of the $178 million was shared between the two trusts. Toulmin Jr.'s first wife, Margaret McCarty, was a life beneficiary under Toulmin Sr.'s trust, where the remainder after Toulmin Jr.'s first wife death was to be allotted to the living descendants of Toulmin Sr.'s grandfather. After the death of Margaret McCarty on September 29, 1994, the Toulmin Sr. remainder trust money had grown to a considerable sum. Since the Toulmin Sr. remainder trust money was to revert under Toulmin Sr.'s will to descendants of his grandfather per stirpes, it became necessary for the executors of Harry Aubrey Toulmin Sr. to trace the living descendants of Toulmin Sr.'s grandfather, Theophilus Lindsey Toulmin (1820?–1895?). On April 21, 1996, eighty-two senior representatives of every surviving branch of Theophilus Lindsey Toulmin received a letter addressing the trust and their potential inheritance from Toulmin Sr.

By 1997, Virginia had reached the age of 72 and the Georgetown University trust fund grew to $62 million. At that time, the donation was the biggest to a Washington-area university and the 17th largest private gift to U.S. higher education. The largest previous private gift to the school was $17 million, which was donated anonymously in 1996.

Virginia died in 2010.

== Works ==
=== Published books ===
- Social historians, by Harry Aubrey Toulmin (1911)
- Bothering business, by Harry Aubrey Toulmin (1925)
- Trade-mark profits and protection, by Harry Aubrey Toulmin (1926)
- Air service, American expeditionary force, 1918, by Harry Aubrey Toulmin (1927)
- Millions in mergers by Harry Aubrey Toulmin (1929)
- Executives' business law, by Harry Aubrey Toulmin (1931)
- Graphic course of patentable inventions, by Harry Aubrey Toulmin (1935)
- With Pershing in Mexico, by Harry Aubrey Toulmin (1935)
- Digest of federal laws pertaining to fair competition in industry,: With chart of government departments, bureaus and commissions in charge of the administration of these laws, by Harry Aubrey Toulmin (1937)
- Inventions and patents, (The Ohio state university. Research foundation lectures 1st) (The Ohio state university. Research foundation lectures 1st) by Harry Aubrey Toulmin (1937)
- Trade agreements and the anti-trust laws: Including forms and an analysis of the Robinson-Patman Act by Harry Aubrey Toulmin (1937)
- The Truman Committee of President Harry S. Truman by Harry Aubrey Toulmin (1937)
- The importance of invention to the nation, by Harry Aubrey Toulmin (1938)
- The law of foods, drugs and cosmetics by Harry Aubrey Toulmin (1942)
- The law of foods, drugs and cosmetics: 1945 pocket supplement by Harry Aubrey Toulmin (1945)
- The Trade-mark act of 1946,: Analyzed, annotated and explained by Harry Aubrey Toulmin (1946)
- Trade agreements and the anti-trust laws: Supplement. 1946– by Harry Aubrey Toulmin (1946)
- Diary of democracy;: The Senate War Investigating Committee by Harry Aubrey Toulmin (1947)
- International contracts and the anti-trust laws: With typical forms of agreements, indictments, complaints, and decrees by Harry Aubrey Toulmin (1947)
- How to keep invention records, together with an explanation of the nature of industrial property by Harry Aubrey Toulmin (1948)
- A treatise on the anti-trust laws of the United States: And including all related trade regulatory laws by Harry Aubrey Toulmin (1949)
- Patents and the anti-trust laws of the United States,: Including trade-marks and copyrights by Harry Aubrey Toulmin (1950)
- "Antitrust laws of the United States" and leading antitrust cases of 1954 by Harry Aubrey Toulmin (1955)
- Trade-mark handbook by Harry Aubrey Toulmin (1957)
- A treatise on the law of foods, drugs, and cosmetics by Harry Aubrey Toulmin (1958)
- Patent law for the executive and engineer by Harry Aubrey Toulmin (1958)
- Making mergers pay (American Management Association. General management series) (American Management Association. General management series) by Harry Aubrey Toulmin (1967)
- A treatise on the law of foods, drugs and cosmetics: 1969 supplement,(combined supplement to volumes 1,2,3 and 4, 2d ed.) by Harry Aubrey Toulmin (1969)
- The city manager;: A new profession (Metropolitan America) by Harry Aubrey Toulmin (1974)
- Light duty vehicle driveability investigation by Harry Aubrey Toulmin (1978)
- Handbook of patents by Harry Aubrey Toulmin (1980)
