= Curtiss 18 =

United States Navy aircraft

Curtiss 18-T Wasp
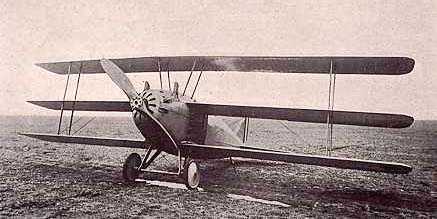

General information
- Type: twoseat fighter triplane
- Manufacturer: Curtiss Engineering Corporation
- Designer: Charles B. Kirkham
- Primary user: United States Navy

History
- Introduction date: February 1919
- First flight: 7 May 1918

The Curtiss 18T, unofficially known as the Wasp and by the United States Navy as the Kirkham, was an early American triplane fighter aircraft designed by Curtiss for the US Navy. It was redesignated Curtiss Model 15 in Curtiss's later rationalization of their model numbering.

== Design and development ==
The Curtiss 18T was intended to protect bombing aircraft over France, and a primary requisite for this job was speed. Speed was not the triplane's only salient feature: an 18T-2 set a new altitude record in 1919 of 34,910 ft (10,640 m). The streamlined and very "clean" fuselage contributed to the aircraft's performance. The basic construction was based on cross-laminated strips of wood veneer formed on a mold and attached to the inner structure. The technique was a refinement of that used on the big Curtiss flying boats.

== Operational history ==
Flown by Roland Rholfs, the 18T achieved a world speed record of 163 mph (262 km/h) in August 1918 carrying a full military load of 1,076 lb (488 kg).

The Model 18T-2 was an improved version of its predecessor, with 50 additional horsepower. The wings of the new model were swept back. It was also 5 ft (150 cm) longer with a 9 ft (270 cm) larger two-bay wing, though its operational ceiling was 2,000 ft (610 m) lower.

After World War I, it was employed as a racing plane: an 18T-2 nearly won the Curtiss Marine Trophy Race in 1922 (limited to U.S. Navy pilots), but the pilot, Lt. Sanderson ran out of fuel just before the finish line.

Curtiss Engineering followed the Model 18T with the Model 18B, unofficially known as the "Hornet", built to otherwise similar specifications.

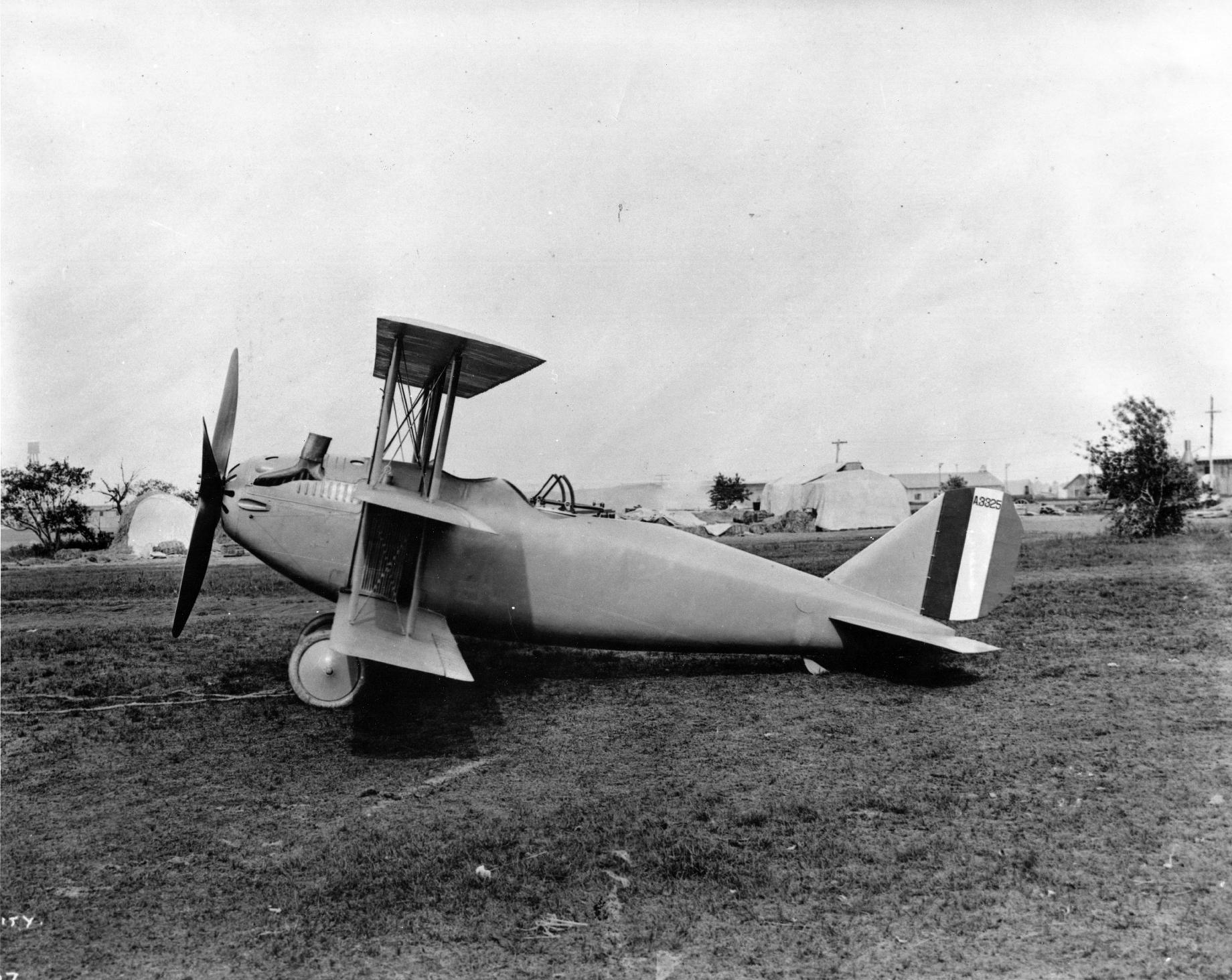
The 18T-1

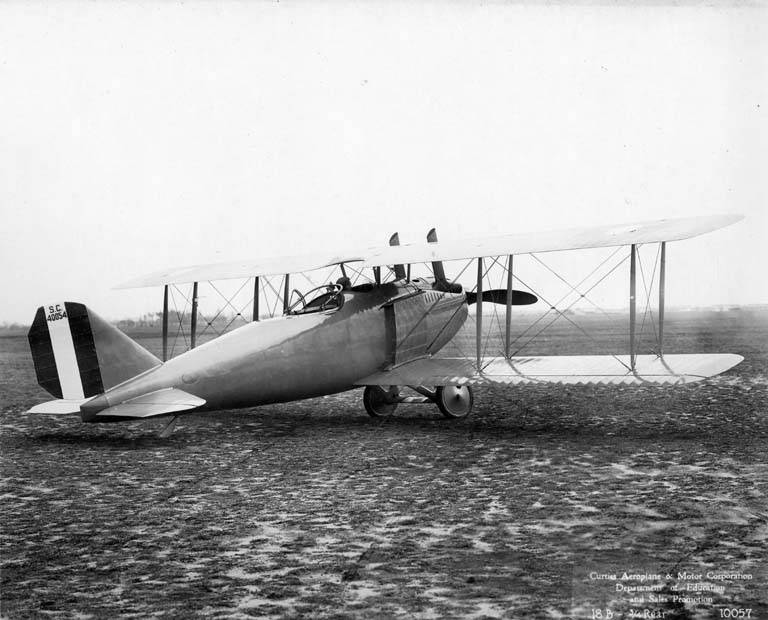
Curtiss 18-B

== Variants ==
Model 18T or 18T-1
Two-seat fighter triplane with single-bay wings, powered by a 400 hp (300 kW) Curtiss K-12 piston engine. Referred to by the US Navy as the "Kirkham". Originally designated 18T, the type was redesignated the 18T-1 when the prototype was modified to a new configuration designated 18T-2 (see below).
Model 18T-2
18T with longer-span two-bay wings. Could be fitted with floatplane or landplane landing gear.
Model 18B
Biplane fighter version, known unofficially as the "Hornet". Sole flying prototype of Curtiss 18B, USAAS 40058, 'P-86', crashed early in flight trials at McCook Field, Dayton, Ohio, summer 1919. Type not ordered into production. One non-flying prototype also delivered for static testing. Redesignated Model 15A

== Operators ==
United States

- United States Navy

== Specifications (18T-1 Wasp) ==
Data from Curtiss Aircraft 1907–1947

General characteristics

- Crew: 2
- Length: 23 ft 4 in (7.11 m)
- Wingspan: 32 ft 0 in (9.75 m)
- Height: 10 ft 2 in (3.10 m)
- Wing area: 288 sq ft (26.8 m^{2})
- Airfoil: Sloane
- Empty weight: 1,980 lb (898 kg)
- Gross weight: 3,050 lb (1,383 kg)
- Powerplant: 1 × Curtiss K-12 V-12 water-cooled piston engine, 400 hp (300 kW)
- Propellers: 2-bladed fixed-pitch propeller

Performance

- Maximum speed: 163 mph (262 km/h, 142 kn)
- Endurance: 5 hours 54 minutes
- Service ceiling: 23,000 ft (7,000 m)
- Time to altitude: 12,500 ft (3,800 m) in 10 minutes

Armament

- Guns:

Primary: 2 × forward-firing synchronized 0.300 in (7.62 mm) Marlin Rockwell M1917/M1918 machine-guns
Secondary: 2 × 0.300 in (7.62 mm) Lewis guns on a Scarff ring in the rear-cockpit plus 1 × Lewis gun firing through an aperture in the aircraft's belly

== Bibliography ==
- Angelucci, Enzo and Peter Bowers. The American Fighter: The Definitive Guide to American Fighter Aircraft from 1917 to the Present. New York: Orion Books, 1985. ISBN 0-517-56588-9.
- Bowers, Peter M. Curtiss Aircraft 1907–1947. London: Putnam, 1979. ISBN 0-370-10029-8.
- "The Curtiss Model 18-T Triplane." Flight, Volume XI, Issue 22, No. 544, 29 May 1919, pp. 698–700.
- "The Curtiss Model 18-B Biplane." Volume XI, Issue 28, No. 550, 10 July 1919, pp. 902–904.
- Green, William and Gordon Swanborough. The Complete Book of Fighters. New York: Salamander, 1994. ISBN 0-8317-3939-8.
- Hagedorn, Dan (March–May 1992). "Curtiss Types in Latin America". Air Enthusiast. No. 45. pp. 61–77. ISSN 0143-5450.
