= Curtiss A-2 (engine) =

1900s American piston aircraft engine

The Curtiss A-2 was a small 2 cylinder V-type engine built by the Curtiss Aeroplane and Motor Company around 1909. It was developed from an earlier Curtiss motorcycle engine.

== Specifications (A-2) ==
=== General characteristics ===
- Type: Two-cylinder, V-type, air-cooled
- Bore: 3.25in (82.55mm)
- Stroke: 3.625in (92.08mm)
- Displacement: 60.14 cuin (986cc)
- Dry weight: 50lb (22.7kg)

=== Components ===
- Cooling system: Air cooled

=== Performance ===
- Power output: 7 hp (5.2 kW) at 1,500 rpm
