= Frank Henry Russell =

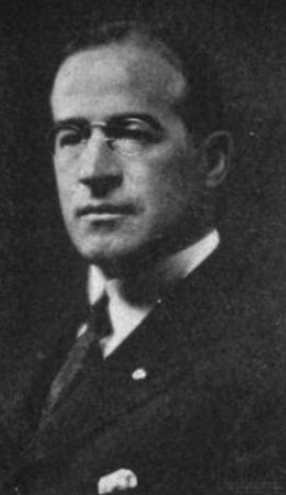
- Born: July 17, 1878; Mansfield, Ohio
- Died: August 4, 1947 (aged 69); Newtown, Bucks County, Pennsylvania
- Known for: Pioneering in the fields of aviation and manufacture of the zipper
- Spouse: Marietta Ford (m. 1902)

Frank Henry Russell (July 17, 1878 – August 4, 1947) was an American aviation pioneer and the first General Manager of the Wright Brothers Company at Dayton, Ohio. He went on to co-found the Burgess Company and the Manufacturers Aircraft Association. He was the Vice President and a director of Curtiss Aeroplane & Motor Company and a director of Curtiss-Wright Corporation.

== Biography ==
Russell was born on July 17, 1878, in Mansfield, Ohio, to Reverend Francis "Frank" Russell, Congregationalist minister, author, and descendant of Reverend Noadiah Russell, and Aurelia Squire Henry Russell. He was a nephew of Russell Alexander Alger and Avra P. Russell. He was graduated from Yale in 1900, and married Marietta Ford on December 31, 1902.

He joined the Laurentide Paper Company of Quebec as Manager of Sales, but came to be recognized for ability in manufacturing management. He became president of Automatic Hook & Eye Company, a predecessor company to Talon Zipper, in Hoboken, New Jersey and held patents for processes in the manufacture of the zipper.

In 1908, the Wright brothers demonstrated their aeroplane in a flight over New York harbor. Russell witnessed the demonstration from the roof of his factory and sought to meet them. Russell joined the newly formed Wright Brothers Aeroplane Company as General Manager in 1910. Russell sold the first military aircraft to the US Army, and donated the prior experimental model which is now at the Smithsonian Air and Space Museum.

In 1911, Russell joined in the formation of the Burgess Company with his friend and Milton Academy classmate William Starling Burgess, who had been manufacturing aircraft under license from Wright. Burgess was acquired by Curtiss in 1914 and Russell became the Vice President - General Manager, and a director of the Curtiss Aeroplane & Motor Company. Under his direction the company developed many of the most successful military planes of the time, which included the NC-4 flying boat and racing planes flown by Jimmy Doolittle and Major Al Williams. Curtiss-Wright was formed in 1929 by the merger of the two formerly rival companies and Russell became a director of the combined enterprise, as well as president of Curtiss Asset Corporation and Curtiss-Caproni, Inc. Some sources credit Russell with pioneering the designs for US fighter aircraft of World War II. In 1931, Russell moved to his farm in Bucks County, Pennsylvania in active retirement until his death there in 1948. He was a director of the Budd Company and focused his efforts on applying aircraft streamlining concepts to trains.

In 1917, Russell participated in the formation of the Manufacturers Aircraft Association and was elected its secretary and later its president, which he remained until his death. The industry association was created to mediate patent disputes between aircraft and component manufacturers that had been hampering American military preparedness during World War I. He was also a member of the National Advisory Committee on Aeronautics.

Russell served as president of the Montauk Club and vice-commodore of the Manhasset Bay Yacht Club on Long Island.

He died at his home, Tinker Farm, in Newtown, Bucks County, Pennsylvania, on August 4, 1947.

== See also ==
- Wright Brothers patent war

== Speeches and testimony ==
- On the State of Civll Aviation, Hearing Before a Subcommittee of the Committee on Commerce, United States Senate. December 19, 1921.
- Buffalo, Hub of Aviation.Buffalo Chamber of Commerce, 1929.

== Collections ==
- The Frank Henry Russell papers, 1901-1947, at the University of Wyoming American Heritage Center. Includes biography.
- Frank Henry Russell papers, journals and photographs at the Smithsonian Institution, Garber Facility, Maryland.
