= Manufacturers Aircraft Association =

Trade association and patent pool of U.S

The Manufacturer's Aircraft Association (MAA) was a trade association and patent pool of U.S. aircraft manufacturers formed in 1917.

The U.S. military and other elements of the U.S. federal government pressured the Wright Company, the Curtiss Aeroplane and Motor Company, and other manufacturers to form the association to break a patent logjam that was preventing U.S. manufacturers from making airplanes that the U.S. military could use in World War I. Legally, the MAA was a private corporation which had an agreement with the airplane manufacturers to cross-license their patents without substantial royalties.

The MAA was dissolved in 1977.

== History and records ==
The U.S. entered World War I in 1917. The two major U.S. companies holding aviation patents, the Wright Company and the Curtiss Company, had effectively blocked the building of new airplanes, which were desired for the war effort. The U.S. government, as a result of a recommendation from the National Advisory Committee for Aeronautics, formed by then Assistant Secretary of the Navy, Franklin D. Roosevelt, pressured the industry to form a cross-licensing organization, the MAA, in 1917. The association was designed as a patent pool which drew up a cross-licensing agreement to allow manufacturers to have unrestrained use of airplane patents in order to produce airplanes for the government's war effort. Early members included aviation pioneers Orville Wright and Glenn Curtiss, as well as representatives of major aircraft manufacturing units in the United States.

Frank Henry Russell participated in the MAA's formation and was elected its president, which he remained until his death in 1947.

Records of the MAA are archived among the Transportation Collections of the University of Wyoming's American Heritage Center, in Laramie, Wyoming. Those records reportedly document the history of aircraft, and document the relationships of the MAA with its various members, the military, and the U.S. Congress. They include records related to the aircraft manufacturing industry's principal trade associations: the Aeronautical Chamber of Commerce of America, Inc. (1920-1943), and the Aerospace Industries Association, Inc. (AIA) (1952-1975). The online inventory of those MAA records provides an introductory section with additional information on the history of the MAA.

== See also ==
- The Wright brothers patent war—which led to the creation of the MAA
- Aerospace Industries Association—a parallel organization that took over some of the same roles after the MAA ended
