= Bleecker Street (disambiguation) =

Bleecker Street is a street in Greenwich Village, New York City.

Bleecker Street may also refer to:

- Bleecker Street (IRT Lexington Avenue Line), a subway station
- Bleecker Street Line
- Bleecker Street Cinemas
- "Bleecker Street", a song on the Simon and Garfunkel album Wednesday Morning, 3 A.M.
- Bleecker Street (IRT Sixth Avenue Line), a former elevated station
- Bleecker Street (company), film studio
- The Saint of Bleecker Street, an opera by American composer Gian Carlo Menotti
