= Piet Bleeker =

Dutch long-distance runner

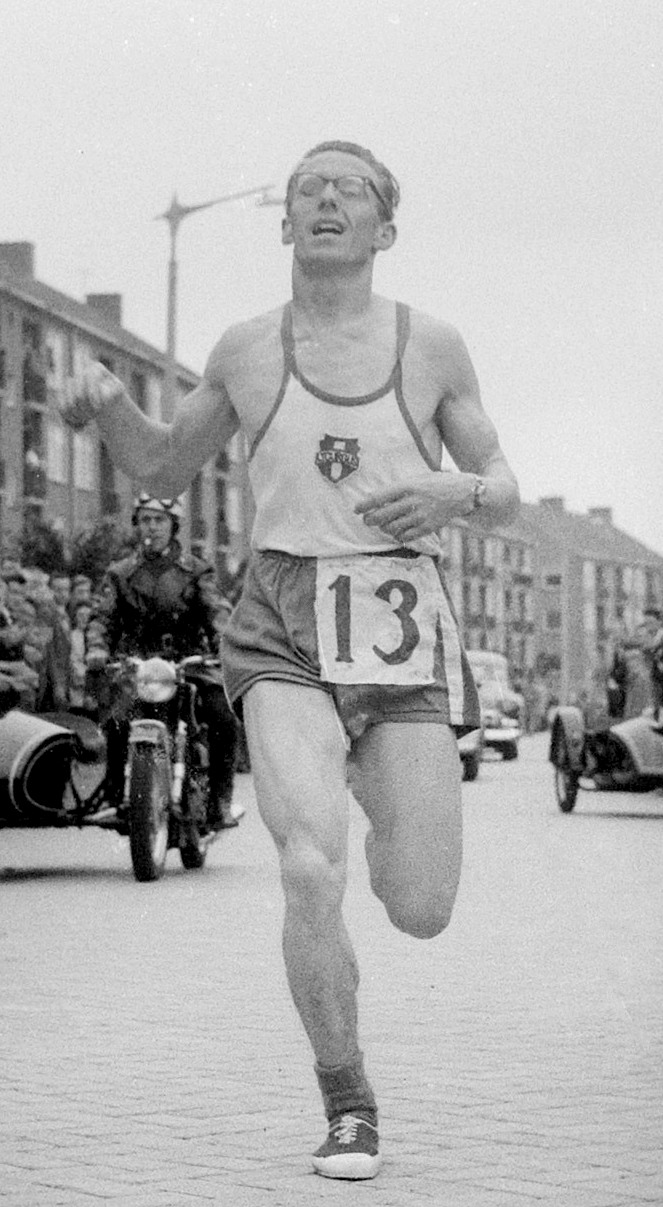
- Piet Bleeker running past the finish line in 1958 at the Dutch Marathon championship in Zaandam

Personal information
- Nationality: Dutch
- Born: 27 August 1928 Heerhugowaard
- Died: 31 January 2018 (aged 89) Beverwijk

Sport
- Country: Netherlands
- Sport: Long-distance running

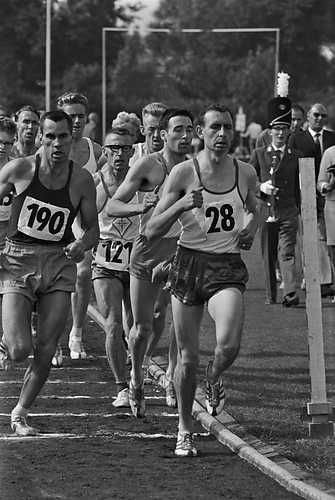
Piet Bleeker (middle, nr. 121) in action on the 10.000 run during the Dutch Championship in 1964.

Piet Bleeker (27 August 1928 – 31 January 2018) was a Dutch long-distance runner, specialised in running the marathon. He became Dutch champion four times, and also earned two national titles in the 25 km category.

== Career ==
=== Start of Athletics career ===
Bleeker was born in Heerhugowaard, and started his athletics career in 1951 by registering with the Alkmaarse Olympus. In 1956 Bleeker was transferred to Av Lycurgus in Krommenie because the athletics facility was better, and because he was employed in the linoleum factory there. He also met his future wife, Jo Dujin, in Krommenie. Due to his marriage and relocation to Beverwijk, he then had himself transferred to the Beverwijk DEM on 1 January 1962.

=== Reached limit for Olympics, but not selected ===
Piet Bleeker delivered his first impressive performance in 1955 when he finished second in the 25 km Dutch championship behind Janus van der Zande. In 1956, after he had become Dutch champion in the 25 km and the marathon earlier that year, he ran a marathon in Zaandam on 6 October 1956, which he won in 2:34.16. The remarkable thing about this was that this performance was within the qualification limit of 2:35.00 for the Olympic Games in Melbourne. Even so, he was not selected for Melbourne, because Bleeker ran this performance after the qualification period had already ended. In retrospect, Bleeker can consider himself fortunate that he was not allowed to travel to Melbourne. As is known, the NOC decided on 7 November 1956 to boycott the Melbourne Olympics in connection with the invasion of the Soviet Union in Hungary, and the subsequent bloody fight in the streets of Budapest. The Dutch delegation, which had since travelled to Melbourne, had to return home due to this measure. Bleeker was spared this disappointment.

=== Marathon title prolonged by victory in Enschede ===
In 1957 the Enschede marathon was also the battlefield for the Dutch title. Bleeker not only succeeded in prolonging his national marathon title, but he also won the competition. This made him the first Dutchman to perform at this marathon.

=== Participation in European Championship ===
In 1958 Bleeker competed in the marathon at the European Championships in Stockholm. In this race won by the Russian Sergej Popov in 2:15.17, he finished 21st in 2:38.45,6. A few weeks earlier he had set the Dutch record for the 10 English miles at 51.50.8 during a 20 km run in Gouda. In October of that year, he then proved supreme during the NK 25 km in 's-Hertogenbosch, on which occasion he also broke the Dutch record on the 25 km of Janus van der Zande from 1: 21.59,6 to 1: 21.13,4.

=== Two times bronze on Dutch Championship running track ===
Although Bleeker's greatest strength on the longer distances was evident, he nevertheless managed to reach the podium several times at Dutch track championships. In 1956 and 1959 he became third in the 10,000 m. In 1957 he fell just outside the prizes with a fourth place. After his sports career, Bleeker started working at DEM as a coach. He died in Beverwijk.

== Dutch Championships ==
| Category | Year |
|---|---|
| 25 km | 1956, 1958 |
| marathon | 1956, 1957, 1958, 1959 |

== Personal Records ==
Track

| Category | Performance | Date | Location |
|---|---|---|---|
| 10,000 m | 31.30.6 | 28 June 1959 | Antwerp |

Road

| Category | Performance | Date | Location |
|---|---|---|---|
| 10 Eng. miles | 51.50.8 | 2 August 1958 | Gouda |
| 20 km | 1:05.53.8 | 30 April 1959 | Alphen aan den Rijn |
| 25 km | 1:21.13,4 (ex-NR) | 19 October 1958 | 's-Hertogenbosch |
| 30 km | 1:43.13,8 | 22 May 1960 | Gronau |
| marathon | 2:32.56,4 (ex-NR) | 11 October 1959 | Košice |

== Palmares ==
=== 10.000 m ===
- 1956: 5th at Int. Belgium-Netherlands - 32.42.8
- 1956: Bronze at Dutch Championship - 32.35.8
- 1957: 5th at Int. Belgium-Netherlands – 32.44.0
- 1957: 4th at Dutch Championship - 33.37.2
- 1958: Silver Int. Netherlands-Belgium - 30.58.2
- 1959: 4th at Int. Belgium-Netherlands - 31.30.6
- 1959: Bronze at Dutch Championship - 31.51.0
- 1959: Silver at Int. France Belgium-Netherlands - 32.10.6
- 1960: 6th at Int. Switzerland-Netherlands-Belgium – 32.22.8
- 1964: 6th at Dutch Championship - 32.19.0

=== 20 km ===
- 1959: Gold at 20 km of Alphen - 1:05.53,8

=== 25 km ===
- 1955: Silver at Dutch Championship - 1:19.55,0
- 1956: Gold at Dutch Championship - 1:26.11,5
- 1957: DNF at Dutch Championship
- 1958: 5th at Straight through Berlin - 1:23.04
- 1958: Gold at Dutch Championship- 1:21.13,4 (NR)
- 1959: Bronze at Dutch Championship - 1:25.51,0
- 1960: 8th at Dutch Championship - 1:31.36,0
- 1961: Silver at Dutch Championship - 1:22.09,2

=== 30 km ===
- 1960: 6th at Int. Germany-Netherlands 30 km at Gronau – 1:43.13,8
- 1961: 10th at Int. Switzerland-Netherlands Germany-Austria, Locarno - 1:50.19,0

=== Marathon ===
- 1956: Gold at Dutch Championship in Amsterdam - 2:42.35
- 1957: Gold at Dutch Championship in Enschede - 2:32.39 (1st overall)
- 1958: Gold at Dutch Championship in Zaandam - 2:29.39 (2nd overall)
- 1958: 21st at European Championship in Stockholm - 2:38.45,6
- 1958: 16th at marathon of Kosice - 2:39.15
- 1959: 9th at "Zeslandenontmoeting" at Duisburg - 2:51.24,4
- 1959: Gold at Dutch Championship in Enschede - 2:35.58 (4th overall)
- 1959: 11th at marathon of Kosice - 2:32.56,4
- 1962: Silver at Dutch Championship in Hilversum - 2:38.40,8

=== Cross Country Running ===
- 1954: 10th at Dutch Championship (short cross = 5000 m)

== Awards ==
- Union Cross of Honor in bronze of the KNAU - 1994
