= Curtiss XP-18 =

Canceled biplane fighter project

The Curtiss XP-18 was ordered in 1930 and was to have been a single-seat biplane powered by a Wright IV-1560 engine. The design was cancelled before Curtiss constructed any.
