= Curtiss XP-19 =

Canceled biplane fighter project

The Curtiss XP-19 was ordered in 1930 and was to have been a single-seat, low-wing monoplane powered by a Wright IV-1560 engine. The design was cancelled before any were built.
