= Maitland B. Bleecker =

American inventor and author (1903–2002)

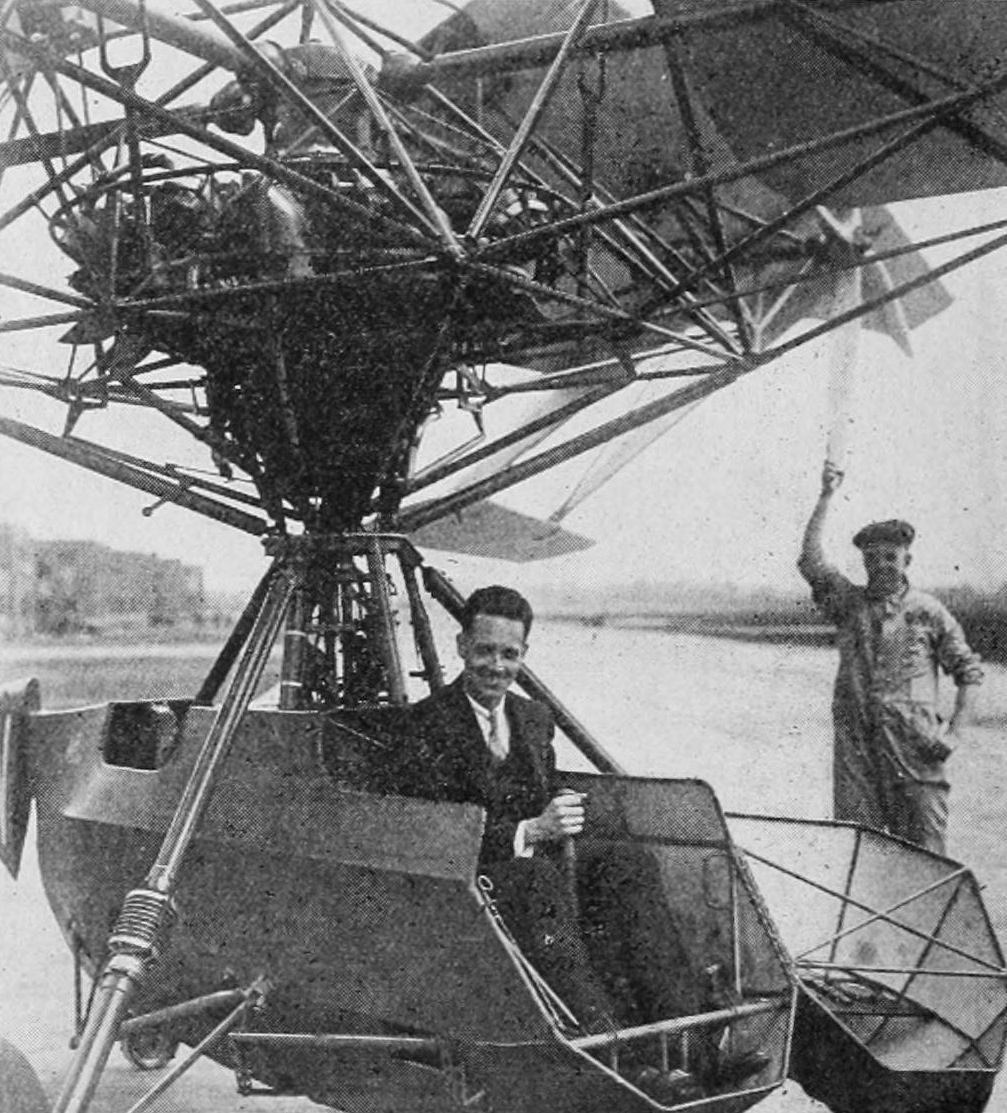
- Maitland Bleecker in the cockpit of his helicopter
- Born: January 25, 1903
- Died: October 19, 2002 (aged 99)
- Occupation: Inventor / Engineer / Scientist
- Years active: 1924 - 1945
- Known for: Curtiss-Bleecker SX-5-1 Helicopter

Maitland B. Bleecker (25 January 1903 – 19 October 2002) was an American inventor and author who was instrumental in modern helicopter design. Bleecker also holds a number of other patents, one including a boat launching device and another for a reaction propulsion device.

== Biography ==
Bleecker graduated from University of Michigan in 1924 and secured a position with National Advisory Committee for Aeronautics at Langley Field, VA. He then joined Curtiss Aeroplane Division where he developed and constructed a prototype helicopter known as the Curtiss-Bleecker SX-5-1 Helicopter at Garden City, NY. This helicopter flew successfully, but the project was abandoned because of The Great Depression.

In 1937 he founded Atlantic Casting and Engineering Corporation and retired in 1945.

Upon his retirement, he purchased 1,500 acres (610 hectares) of land near West Milford, N.J. where he constructed Lake Sonoma, started a trout hatchery, and operated the Tapawingo Fishing Preserve. This area is now a part of Norvin Green State Forest.
