= Curtiss K-12 =

1916 liquid-cooled aircraft engine

K-12
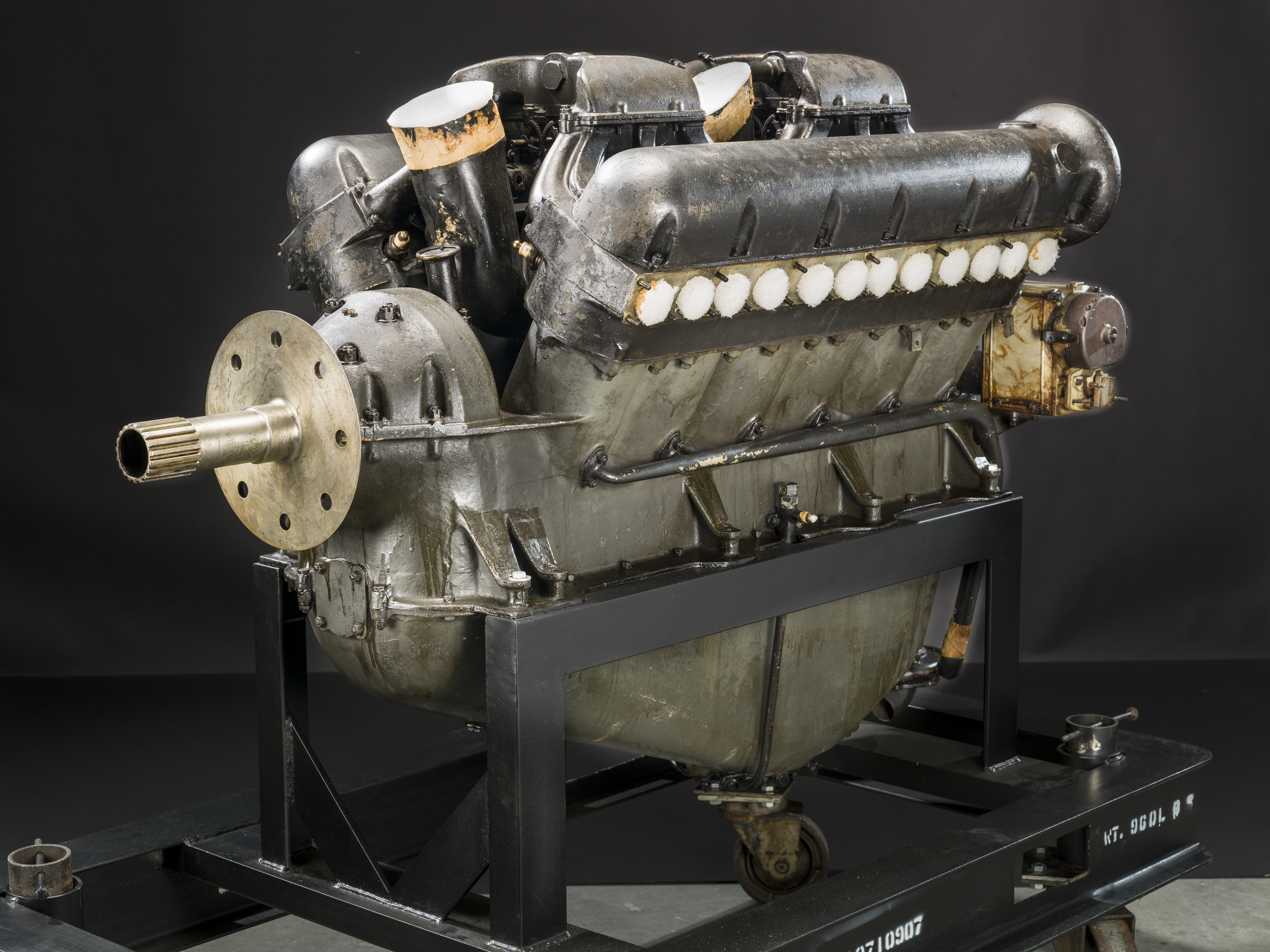
- Curtiss K-12 at the National Air and Space Museum
- Type: V12 piston engine
- Manufacturer: Curtiss Aeroplane and Motor Company
- First run: 1916
- Developed into: Curtiss D-12

The Curtiss K-12 was a milestone in the development of liquid-cooled aircraft engines and was regarded as one of the most advanced in the world for its time. First tested in 1916, it suffered from a number of reliability problems and was not widely built as a result, but its basic design was the basis for the hugely successful Curtiss D-12 of 1922.

== Design and development ==
Designed by Charles B. Kirkham and first tested in 1916, the K-12 featured a cast aluminum upper crankcase and integral cylinder blocks, four valves per cylinder, and "wet sleeve" construction for improved cooling. It relied upon high rpm and reduction gearing to develop the same power as larger engines. Although technologically advanced, many of the K-12's innovations challenged the state-of-the-art and created serious reliability problems. Most problems were centered on producing reliable reduction gears.

The K-12 design led to the development of the very successful Curtiss D-12 (1922) engine used in fighters and racing planes. By 1926 the D-12 design had evolved into the more powerful Curtiss V-1570 "Conqueror," noted for its use in military aircraft. That evolution was continued in the powerful liquid-cooled, V-12 aircraft engines of World War II that owed so much to design concepts pioneered in the K-12 engine of 1916.

== Specifications (Curtiss K-12) ==
=== General characteristics ===
- Type: 12-cylinder liquid-cooled V
- Bore: 4.5 in (114.3 mm)
- Stroke: 6.0 in (152.4 mm)
- Displacement: 1,145.1 cu in (18.77 L)

=== Components ===
- Cooling system: liquid

=== Performance ===
- Power output: 375 hp at 2,250 RPM
