= List of eponymous streets in New York City =

This is a list of streets and squares in New York City named after a person, organized by borough. Over the years, streets have been named in honor of various historical figures, in addition to first responders, singers, and politicians' parents.

== Manhattan ==
- Allen Street – Captain William Henry Allen, the youngest person to command a Navy ship in the War of 1812.
- Ann Street – Ann White, wife of developer and merchant Capt. Thomas White
- Astor Place and Astor Row – John Jacob Astor and other members of the Astor family, landowners
- Baxter Street – Lt. Col. Charles Baxter, a hero of the Mexican War who was killed in Chapultepec in 1849.
- Bayard Street and Hester Street – Hester Bayard
- Beach Street – Paul Bache, the son-in-law of Anthony Lispenard, who owned Lispenard Meadows, just south of what is now Canal Street
- Beekman Place, Beekman Street, William Street – Wilhelmus Beekman
- Bleecker Street – Anthony Bleecker (1770–1827). a lawyer, poet and friend of Washington Irving and William Cullen Bryant, because the street ran through Bleecker's farm.
- Bogardus Place – the Bogardus family, including Everardus Bogardus and James Bogardus
- Bond Street – William Bond, city surveyor.
- Bowery – an anglicization of the Dutch bouwerie, derived from an antiquated Dutch word for "farm": In the 17th century the area contained many large farms.
- Broome Street – John Broome, lieutenant governor of New York
- Cabrini Boulevard – Mother Cabrini
- Catherine Street – Catherine Rutgers, wife of Hendrick Rutgers, mother of Henry Rutgers
- Charles Street – Charles Christopher Amos, landowner
- Christopher Street – Charles Christopher Amos, landowner. Prior to 1799 known as Skinner Road after Col. William Skinner, son-in-law of landowner Adm. Peter Warren
- Chrystie Street – Col. John Chrystie, a veteran of the War of 1812.
- Clinton Street – George Clinton, a general in the Revolutionary War who was the first governor of New York State—from 1777 to 1795, and again from 1801 to 1804.
- Columbus Circle – for the quadricentennial of the first voyage of Christopher Columbus
- Cortlandt Street – for the Cortlandt family, landowners
- Delancey Street – James De Lancey, who served as chief justice, lieutenant governor, and acting colonial governor of the Province of New York, and who owned a farm located in what is now the Lower East Side
- Frederick Douglass Boulevard – named after Frederick Douglass, African American abolitionist, orator, newspaper publisher and former slave
- Doyers Street – Hendrik Doyer, an 18th-century Dutch immigrant who bought the property facing the Bowery in 1791
- Dyckman Street – named for Dutch farmer William Dyckman, whose family owned farmland in the area; the Dyckman House, located nearby at the corner of Broadway and 204th Street, was built by William Dyckman in 1784 and is the oldest remaining farmhouse in Manhattan, and many consider it the border between Washington Heights and Inwood.
- Eldridge Street – Lt. Joseph C. Eldridge, killed in the War of 1812
- Elizabeth Street – Elizabeth Rynders, wife of Nicholas Bayard II, and daughter of Hester Rynders Bayard.
- Essex Street – Essex county in England
- Forsyth Street – Lt. Col. Benjamin Forsyth
- Fulton Street – Robert Fulton
- Gansevoort Street - Peter Gansevoort, a hero in the siege of Fort Stanwix (Fort Schuyler) which contributed to the downfall of Burgoyne's army at the Battle of Saratoga during the Revolutionary War.
- Gay Street – possibly a surname of a local family, apocryphally to Sidney Howard Gay.
- Gold Street – Nathan Gold, an American colonial leader and deputy governor of the Colony of Connecticut.
- Gouverneur Street – Abraham Gouverneur, a 17th-century Dutch immigrant turned big-time New York political activist.
- Great Jones Street – Samuel Jones, "The Father of The New York Bar"
- Henry Street – Henry Rutgers, American Revolutionary War hero
- Houston Street (pronounced /ˈhaʊstən/ HOW-stən) – William Houstoun, Founding Father.
- Hudson Street – Henry Hudson, an English sea explorer and navigator during the early 17th century, best known for his explorations of present-day Canada and parts of the northeastern United States. Also named after the Hudson River
- Irving Place – Washington Irving known for his A History of New York and short stories like The Legend of Sleepy Hollow and Rip Van Winkle
- James Street and Saint James Place - St. James the Greater, one of the twelve apostles of Jesus, and one of the Christian faith's most enduring figures.
- Jefferson Street – Thomas Jefferson, American statesman, diplomat, lawyer, architect, philosopher, and Founding Father who served as the third president of the United States from 1801 to 1809. He was the primary author of the Declaration of Independence.
- John Street – John Haberdinck, a wealthy Dutch shoemaker
- Jones Street – Doctor Gardner Jones
- Peter Jennings Way – Peter Jennings, ABC News anchor
- Juan Pablo Duarte Boulevard (part of Saint Nicholas Avenue) – Juan Pablo Duarte, a founding father of the Dominican Republic
- Kenmare Street – Kenmare, town in County Kerry, Ireland
- Lafayette Street – Marquis de Lafayette, a French hero of the American Revolutionary War
- LaGuardia Place – Fiorello LaGuardia, Mayor of New York City
- La Salle Street – Jean-Baptiste de La Salle, a French priest, educational reformer, and founder of the Institute of the Brothers of the Christian Schools.
- Leonard Street – Col. Leonard Lispenard, a New York City merchant, politician and landowner.
- Lenox Avenue – James Lenox, philanthropist
- Lispenard Street – Anthony Lispenard Bleecker, banker, merchant and auctioneer, and one of the richest men in New York.
- Ludlow Street – Augustus Ludlow, War of 1812 naval hero
- MacDougal Street – Alexander McDougall, Revolutionary War hero
- Madison Avenue and Madison Street – James Madison, fourth president of the United States
- Malcolm X Boulevard (co-named with Lenox Avenue) – Malcolm X, African American human rights activist and Nation of Islam leader
- Mercer Street – Hugh Mercer, American Revolutionary War figure
- Mott Street – Joseph Mott, a butcher and tavern owner who provided support to the rebel forces in the American Revolution.
- Mulberry Street – mulberry trees
- Nassau Street – William of Nassau
- North Moore Street – Benjamin Moore (bishop), second Episcopal bishop of New York, president of Columbia University
- Rivington Street – James Rivington, Revolutionary War-era publisher
- Rutgers Street – Henry Rutgers, American Revolutionary War hero
- St. Mark's Place – from St. Mark's Church in-the-Bowery, named for Saint Mark; also recalls Piazza San Marco, Venice, Italy
- Saint Nicholas Avenue – Saint Nicholas, patron saint of Amsterdam
- Stanton Street – George Stanton, an associate of landowner James De Lancey
- Stuyvesant Street – Peter Stuyvesant, last governor of New Netherland, who owned the land
- Sullivan Street – John Sullivan, American Revolutionary War general
- Thompson Street – William Thompson, Revolutionary War general
- Vanderbilt Avenue – Vanderbilt family, who owned Grand Central Terminal, the construction of which predated construction of the road
- Varick Street – Richard Varick, American Revolutionary War figure and Mayor of New York City
- Vesey Street – after Rev. William Vesey
- Walker Street – Benjamin Walker (1753–1818), a Revolutionary War officer.
- Washington Street – George Washington, first president of the United States
- William Street – Wilhelmus Beekman
- Wooster Street – David Wooster, American Revolutionary War hero
- Worth Street – William J. Worth, American officer during the War of 1812, the Second Seminole War, and the Mexican–American War
- Vandam Street - Anthony Van Dam, a wine and liquor dealer who was active in civil affair.

=== Squares ===
- Chatham Square – William Pitt, 1st Earl of Chatham, Prime Minister of Great Britain
- Duffy Square – Chaplain Francis P. Duffy of New York's 69th Infantry Regiment
- Hanover Square – the House of Hanover
- Herald Square – The New York Herald newspaper (printed 1835–1924)
- Lincoln Square – a local landowner
- Madison Square – James Madison, fourth President of the United States
- Times Square – The New York Times
- Tompkins Square Park – Daniel D. Tompkins (1774–1825), Vice President of the United States
- Verdi Square – Giuseppe Verdi, Italian composer
- Washington Square Park – George Washington
- Worth Square – William J. Worth

=== Intersections ===
- Isaiah Che Moronta – a community member

== The Bronx ==
- Allerton Avenue – Daniel Allerton, an early Bronx settler who purchased and farmed this area with his wife Hustace.
- Arthur Avenue – United States President Chester A. Arthur
- Bailey Avenue – Nathaniel Platt Bailey, merchant and philanthropist
- Bathgate Avenue – Andrew Bathgate, a Scottish immigrant, who managed a nearby estate for Gouverneur Morris, one of the founders of the Bronx, and later purchased his own estate from Gouverneur Morris.
- Bainbridge Avenue – William Bainbridge, a Commodore in the United States Navy. He is notable for his many victories at sea. He commanded several famous naval ships, including USS Constitution, and saw service in the Barbary Wars and the War of 1812.
- Bartow Avenue – John Bartow, a missionary for the Anglican Society for the Propagation of the Gospel in London.
- Bruckner Boulevard and Bruckner Expressway – Henry Bruckner, politician and longtime borough president.
- Corsa Avenue – Andrew Corsa who led 5,000 American and French troops to Morrisania to survey British fortifications.
- Deputy Chief Orio J. Palmer Way – Orio Palmer, Battalion Chief of the New York City Fire Department who died while rescuing civilians trapped inside the World Trade Center on September 11, 2001.
- Detective Sean Carrington Way – Sean Carrington, a New York City Police Department detective fatally shot in the line of duty in 1998.
- DJ Scott La Rock Boulevard – Scott La Rock, a social worker, hip hop DJ, music producer and founding member of Boogie Down Productions fatally shot in 1987.
- Donald Byrd Way – Donald Byrd, jazz and rhythm & blues trumpeter and vocalist.
- Elias Karmon Way – Elias Karmon, a generous philanthropist and humanitarian to multiple causes in and outside of the Bronx, and owner of multiple businesses in the Bronx since the late 1930s.
- Elmo Hope Way – Jazz Pioneer; for Elmo Hope, pianist, composer and arranger.
- Emmanuel Mensah Way – Emmanuel Mensah, a National Guardsman who died trying to save four children from an apartment building fire in December 2017.
- Fish Avenue – Hamilton Fish, American statesman and Governor of New York
- Grant Avenue – United States President Ulysses S. Grant
- Hillman Avenue – Sidney Hillman, labor leader.
- Hoffman Street – John T. Hoffman, 79th mayor of New York City from 1866 to 1868 and 23rd Governor of New York from 1869 to 1872.
- Hugh J. Grant Circle – Hugh J. Grant, 88th mayor of New York City from 1889 to 1892.
- Hughes Avenue – John Hughes, the first Roman Catholic Archbishop of New York, and founder of Fordham University.
- Hull Ave – Isaac Hull, Commodore in the United States Navy. He commanded several famous U.S. naval warships including USS Constitution ("Old Ironsides") and saw service in the undeclared naval Quasi War, the Barbary Wars and the War of 1812.
- Katonah Avenue – Katonah, Lenape sachem
- Lesandro Junior Guzman-Feliz Way – Lesandro Guzman-Feliz, a 15-year-old teenager killed in a brutal gang attack in The Bronx on June 20, 2018, in case of mistaken identity.
- Longstreet Avenue – James Longstreet, Confederate general
- Major Deegan Expressway – William Francis Deegan, an architect, organizer of the American Legion, major in the Army Corps of Engineers, and Democratic Party political leader in New York City
- Meagher Avenue – Thomas Francis Meagher, Irish revolutionary and Union general in the American Civil War
- Olinville Avenue – Stephen Olin, educator and minister
- Perry Avenue – Oliver Hazard Perry, U.S. Naval officer noted for his heroic role in the War of 1812 during the 1813 Battle of Lake Erie.
- Reynolds Avenue – John F. Reynolds, American Civil War general.
- Rivera Avenue – Mariano Rivera, a Panamanian-American former professional baseball pitcher who played 19 seasons in Major League Baseball for the New York Yankees, from 1995 to 2013.
- Rose Feiss Boulevard – Rose Feiss, founder of a lampshade manufacturer on what was Walnut Avenue in the Bronx.
- Seabury Avenue – Samuel Seabury, first Bishop of the Protestant Episcopal of America.
- Sedgwick Avenue – John Sedgwick, American Civil War general.
- Seymour Avenue – Horatio Seymour, Governor of New York
- Sheridan Avenue – Philip Sheridan, American Civil War general.
- Sheridan Boulevard or Sheridan Expressway, officially New York State Route 895 – Arthur V. Sheridan, Bronx Borough Commissioner of Public Works
- Southern Boulevard (formerly Theodore Kazimiroff Boulevard) – Theodore Kazimiroff, Bronx historian and a founder of The Bronx County Historical Society. Although part of Southern Boulevard was renamed after Kazimiroff in 1980, his name was removed from street signs in 2011 because he was not well known even among many Bronx locals. This was one of the few instances where an eponymous street has reverted to its old name.
- Throggmorton Avenue – John Throckmorton, American settler for whom Throggs Neck is also named
- Van Cortlandt Avenue – Jacobus Van Cortlandt, a wealthy Dutch-born American merchant, slave owner, and politician who served as the 30th and 33rd Mayor of New York City from 1710 to 1711 and again from 1719 to 1720.

== Brooklyn ==
- Albee Square – named after Edward Franklin Albee II
- Adams Street – named after John Adams
- Bergen Street – named after Hans Hansen Bergen
- Bond Street – named after William Bond
- Boyland Street – named after Thomas S. Boyland
- Bainbridge Street – named after William Bainbridge
- Cadman Plaza – named after Samuel Parkes Cadman
- Carroll Street - named after Charles Carroll of Carrollton
- Chauncey Street – named after Issac Chauncey
- Clark Street – named after William Clark, ship's captain
- Clinton Avenue and Clinton Street - named after Dewitt Clinton
- Cropsey Avenue – named after the Cropsey family
- Decatur Street – named after Stephen Decatur, Jr.
- DeKalb Avenue – named after Johann de Kalb
- Doughty Street – named after Charles Doughty
- Duffield Street – named after John Duffield
- Elizabeth Place – named after Elizabeth Cornell
- Fulton Street – named after Robert Fulton
- Franklin Avenue – named after Benjamin Franklin
- Furman Street – named after Richard Furman
- Gallatin Place – named after Albert Eugene Gallatin
- Garfield Place - named after James A. Garfield
- Gates Avenue – named after Horatio Lloyd Gates
- Gold Street – named after Nathan Gold
- Greene Avenue – named after Nathanael Greene
- Halsey Street – named after James M. Halsey
- Hancock Street – named after John Hancock
- Hanover Place – named after the House of Hanover
- Henry Street – named after Dr. Thomas Henry
- Herzl Street – named after Theodor Herzl
- Hicks Street – named after John and Jacob Hicks
- Hoyt Street – named after Jesse Hoyt
- Hunts Lane – named after John Hunt
- Jay Street – named after John Jay
- Joralemon Street – named after Tumis Joralemon
- Lafayette Avenue – is named after Marquis de Lafayette
- Lawrence Street – named after William Beach Lawrence
- Lewis Avenue – named after Morgan Lewis
- Linden Boulevard – named after Pierre Léonard Vander Linden
- Livingston Street – named after Philip Livingston
- MacDonough Street – named after Thomas MacDonough
- Macon Street – named after Nathaniel Macon
- Madison Street – named after James Madison
- Malcolm X Boulevard – named after Reverend Malcolm X
- McGuinness Boulevard – named after Peter McGuinness
- Monroe Street and Monroe Place - named after James Monroe
- Montague Street – named after Lady Mary Wortley Montagu
- Nevins Street – named after Russell H. Nevins
- Nostrand Avenue – named after Gerret Noorstrandt
- Pierrepont Street and Pierrepont Place – named after Hezekiah Pierrepont
- Remsen Street and Remsen Avenue – named after Henry Remsen
- Sackett Street – named after Samuel Sackett
- Schermerhorn Street – named after Peter Schermerhorn
- Sidney Place – named after Sir Philip Sidney
- Smith Street – named after Samuel Smith
- Tilden Avenue – named after Samuel J. Tilden
- Tillary Street – named after James Tillary
- Vanderbilt Avenue – named after Vanderbilt family
- Warren Street – named after John Earl Warren Jr.
- Washington Avenue – named after George Washington
- Willoughby Avenue and Willoughby Street – named after Samuel Willoughby
- Wilson Avenue – named after Woodrow Wilson

== Queens ==
- Francis Lewis Boulevard – named after Francis Lewis, local resident and signer of the Declaration of Independence
- Guillermo Vasquez Corner – named after leading gay rights, AIDS, and Latino community activist in Queens
- Jackie Robinson Parkway – named after Major League Baseball player, Jackie Robinson
- Roosevelt Avenue – named after 26th president of the United States, Theodore Roosevelt
- Steinway Street – named for the makers of the famed Steinway piano. Their factory is located in Astoria, Queens, where this street runs through.
- Seaver Way – named after Tom Seaver, who signed with the New York Mets in 1966 and pitched for the team from 1967 to 1977.
- Van Wyck Expressway (formerly Van Wyck Boulevard) – named after Robert Anderson Van Wyck, the first mayor of New York City after the consolidation of the five boroughs

== Staten Island ==
- Father Capodanno Boulevard – Vincent R. Capodanno, killed in action in the Vietnam War
- Hylan Boulevard – John F. Hylan, Mayor of New York City

== See also ==
- List of eponymous roads in London
- List of eponymous streets in Metro Manila
