= James W. Bleecker =

American banker

4th President of the New York Stock Exchange
- In office 1827–1830
- Preceded by: Edward Lyde
- Succeeded by: Russell H. Nevins

Personal details
- Born: James Ward Bleecker; October 16, 1787 New York City, U.S.
- Died: October 5, 1864 (aged 76) New York City, U.S.
- Spouse: Sarah Elizabeth Fanning (m. 1811–1864)
- Relations: Anthony Lispenard Bleecker (uncle); Anthony Bleecker (cousin)
- Occupation: Banker

James Ward Bleecker (October 16, 1787 – October 5, 1864) was an American banker and the fourth president of the New York Stock Exchange.

== Family ==
He was the son of John Jacob Bleecker (1745-1795) and Hester (nee De Veaux) Bleecker (b. 1753). Among his siblings were Frederick Devoe Bleecker, John Schuyler Bleecker, John Anthony Bleecker, and Henry Fletcher Bleecker.

His paternal grandparents were Jacobus Rutger Bleecker (son of Albany mayor Rutger Jansen Bleecker) and Abigail (née Lispenard) Bleecker (daughter of Anthony Lispenard). His paternal uncle was Anthony Lispenard Bleecker, the prominent banker, merchant, and auctioneer (and namesake of Bleecker Street in lower Manhattan). On August 17, 1811, Bleecker was married to Sarah Elizabeth Fanning (1796–1881) in New York City. Sarah was the only daughter of Edward Fanning. Together, they were the parents of eleven children, including:

- Sarah Fanning Bleeker (1812–1898)
- James Edmund Bleecker (1814–1859)
- John Rhinelander Bleecker (1816–1845), who married Mary Elizabeth Clinton (1822–1897), a granddaughter of James Clinton and niece of Governor DeWitt Clinton and U.S. Representative George Clinton Jr.
- Mary Louisa Bleecker (1818–1864)
- William Fanning Bleecker (1820–1820), who died in infancy.
- Ann Elizabeth Bleecker (1822–1860)
- Henry Augustus Bleecker (1824–1860)
- Laura Bleecker (1826–1826), who died in infancy.
- Juliet Fanning Bleecker (1828–1908), who married Robert Chesebrough Rathbone in 1849.
- Lavina Bleecker (1831–1832), who died in infancy.
- William Bleecker (1833–1833), who died in infancy.

Bleecker died on October 5, 1864. His chair on the Exchange was sold at auction for charity for $460.

== Career ==
In 1792, his father John and cousin Garret Bleecker were among the twenty-six men who signed the Buttonwood Agreement, which was an effort to organize securities trading in New York City that preceded the formation of what became known as the New York Stock Exchange. Bleecker focused on marine insurance before focusing on securities later in his career.

From 1827 to 1830, he succeeded Edward Lyde as the fourth president of the New York Stock Exchange. Bleecker was, in turn, succeeded by Russell H. Nevins, and the Mohawk and Hudson Rail Road became the first railroad to be listed on the Exchange. Following his tenure as president, beginning in 1833, he became the first Treasurer of the Board, serving until his retirement in 1861, with the sole exception of 1835, when John Ward (also a former president) served as Treasurer. He was succeeded as Treasurer by LeGrand Lockwood.
