= George W. Bleecker =

American politician (1800–1859)

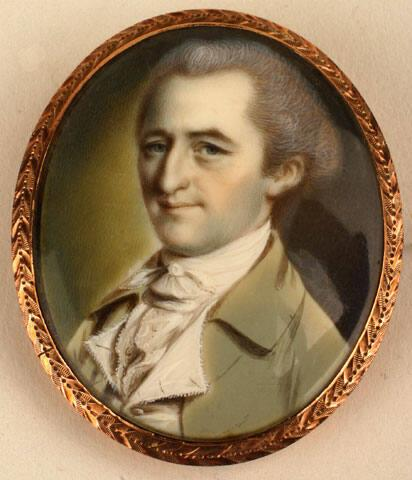
Major Gen. Leonard Bleecker, father of George W. Bleecker

George Washington Bleecker (January 1, 1800 – November 23, 1859) was an American teacher and politician from New York. He was the son of Leonard Bleecker, a Major General during the Revolutionary war, and personal friend of George Washington.

== Life ==
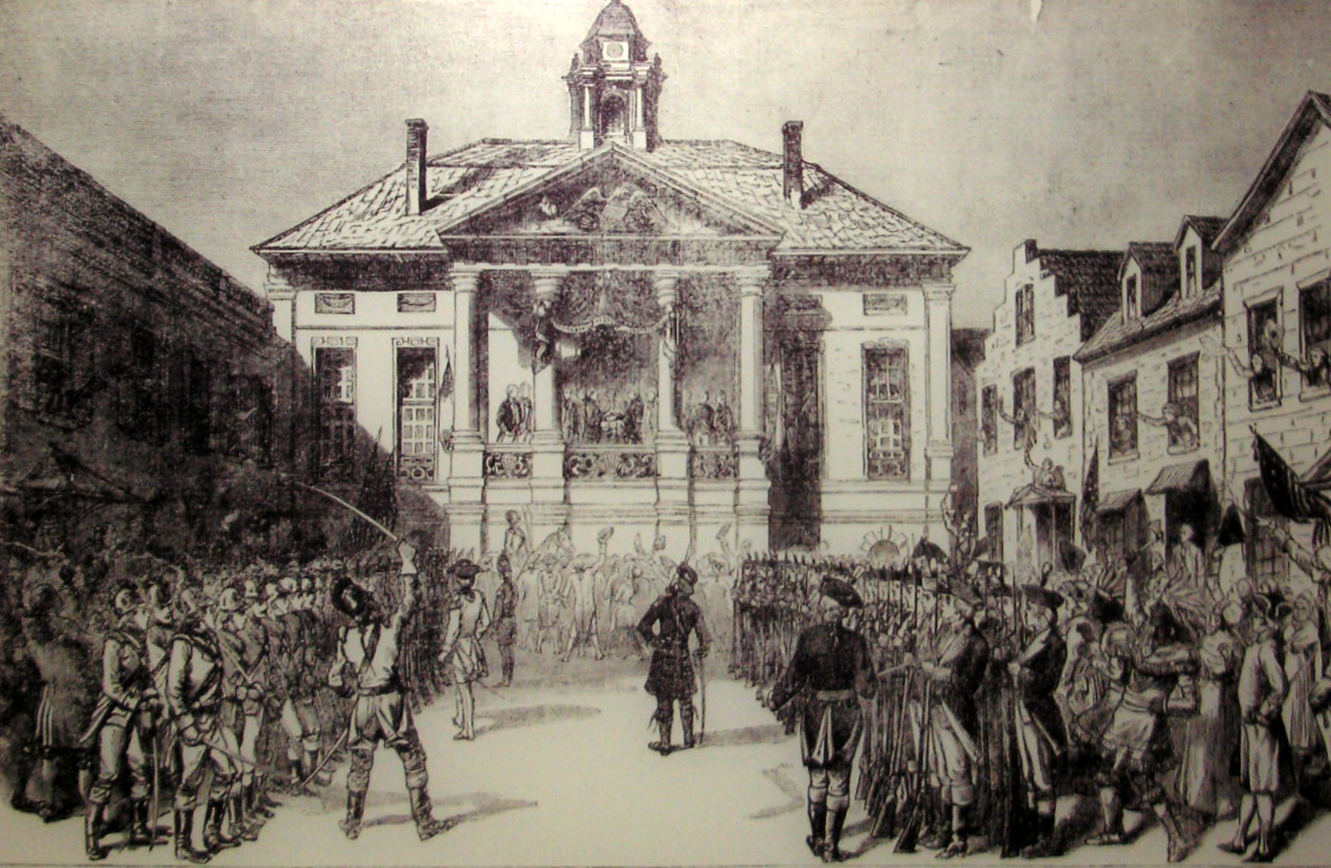
Maj. Gen. Leonard Bleecker, a personal friend of George Washington, was one the six officers who escorted him to the First Presidential inauguration in 1789

Bleecker was born in New York City on January 1, 1800. His father, Leonard Bleecker was an American Revolutionary War veteran, a New York assemblyman, and a personal friend and correspondent of George Washington. He was a direct descendant of Jan Jansen Bleecker. He served as second Lieutenant under Gen. Montgomery for the Invasion of Quebec (1775), and as Major general under Gen. John Sullivan. He then served as Major general under the Marquis de Lafayette, and witnessed with him the surrender of British General Cornwallis at the Siege of Yorktown. At the First inauguration of George Washington at Federal Hall, as 1st President of the United States, Washington was escorted by Bleecker and five other leading military officers, who were all prominent freemasons, and was one of the original founders of the veteran Society of the Cincinnati.

Leonard was also one of the founders of Wall Street, being a founder of the New York Stock Exchange through the Buttonwood Agreement, and was a brother of Anthony Lispenard Bleecker. Their uncle Col. Leonard Lispenard married with Benjamin Franklin's family (Bache), the Roosevelts and Van Cortlandts. Bleecker entered into a partnership in 1791 with merchant John Pintard, a founder of the New York Historical Society, the first museum in the city, and had office at the Merchants’ Coffee House in Manhattan, which was also the offices of the Bank of New York, founded by Hamilton, and the New York Chamber of Commerce. His granddaughter, Fannie Amelia Bleecker, married Frank Willey Yale (b. 1854), a relative of Charles G. Yale and Yale Gracey, members of the Yale family of Yale University.

At the age of 20, George W. Bleecker joined the United States Navy as a midshipman, serving for the next five years. He then worked in the publishing and book business. From 1833 to 1844, he served as principal to different private female seminaries and taught over 1,400 pupils from across the country. He then worked in the New York Custom House, first as an examiner in the Appraiser's Department then as an inspector in the Collector's Department.

In 1856, Bleecker was elected supervisor of the Brooklyn Seventh Ward. In 1857, he was elected to the New York State Assembly as a Democrat, representing the Kings County 7th District. He served in the Assembly in 1858.

In 1821, Bleecker married Phebe S. Jordan. She died in 1826. He then married Ann Eliza Watson. He was a Baptist, and served as secretary of the New York Sunday School Teachers' Association. He also served as a manager of the Saint Nicholas Society of the City of New York.

Bleecker died in Brooklyn on November 23, 1859. He was buried in Green-Wood Cemetery.

New York State Assembly
Preceded by District Created	New York State Assembly; Kings County, 7th District; 1858	Succeeded by Franklin Tuthill
