= Charles G. Yale =

US mining geologist from California (1847-1926)

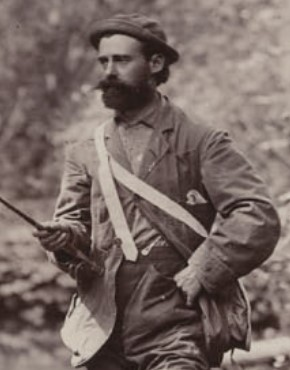
Portrait of Charles Gregory Yale

Charles Gregory Yale (1847 – 1926) was a businessman and yachtman, Secretary of the San Francisco Yacht Club and cofounder of the Pacific Inter-Club Yacht Association. With William C. Ralston, founder of the Bank of California, he cofounded the San Francisco Miners' Association, renewing interest in hydraulic mining. He was a leading mineralogist and geologist who worked for the U.S. Geological Survey, and became statistician of the San Francisco Mint.

He also wrote various articles and books on the mining and gold industry, and was candidate for mayor of Oakland, California, against Melvin C. Chapman.

== Early life ==
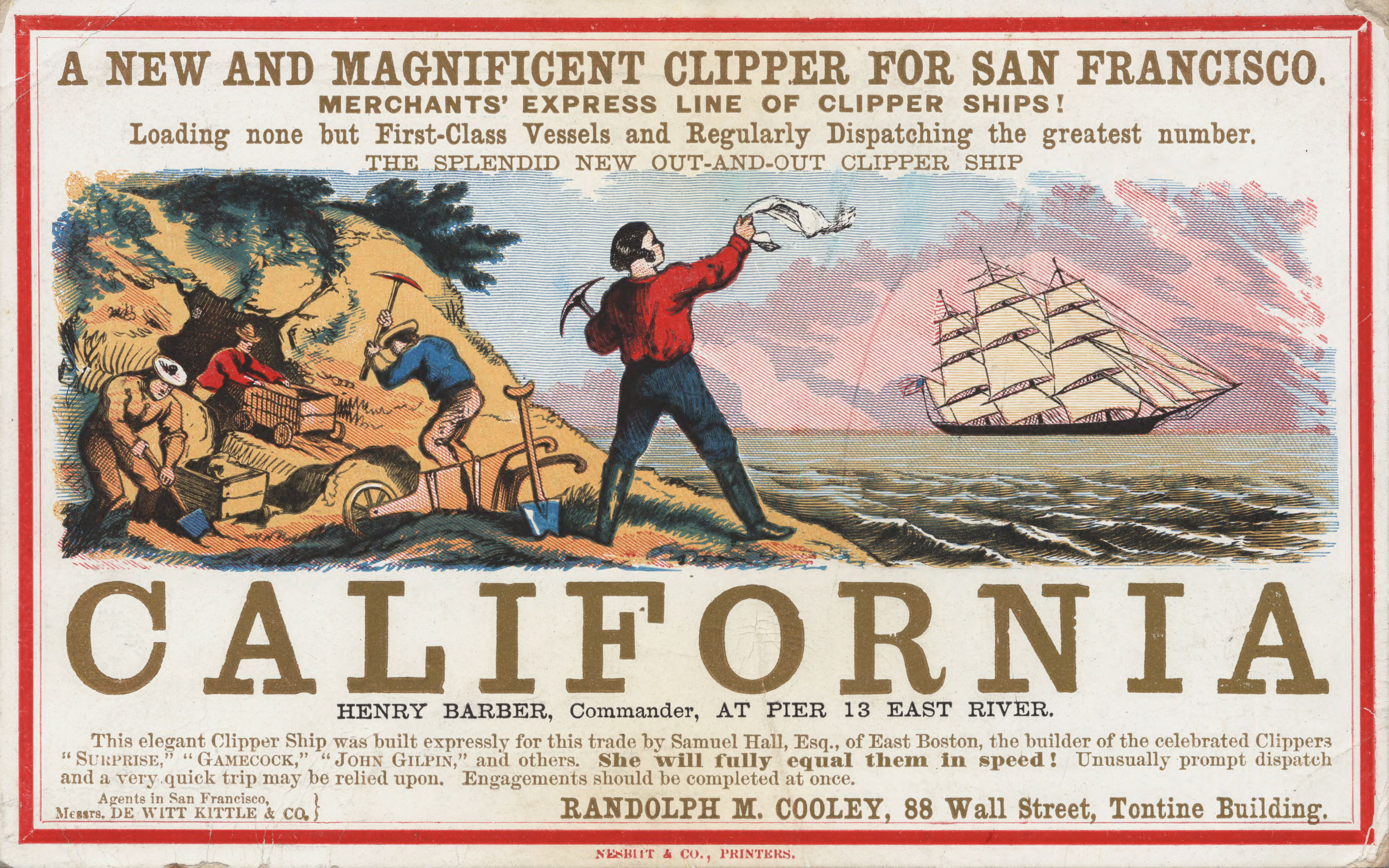
The California Gold Rush, Charles G. Yale's emigrated on a Schooner as a child to San Francisco, as his father was one of the early mining lawyers in the state

Charles Gregory Yale was born October 22, 1847, in Jacksonville, Florida, to Colonel Gregory Yale of San Francisco and Frances Ellen Willey, members of the Yale family. His father was one of the early mining and maritime lawyers who sailed to San Francisco with his family, arriving there December 28, 1849. He wrote the first treatise on mining law published in the United States. He took park in public affairs, invested in land developments, including South Park, San Francisco, and by 1857, had accumulated a fortune of $300,000 during the California Gold Rush, which he lost after bad investments.

He was in partnership under Yale & McConnell, with Attorney General John R. McConnell, and sat on committees with Congressman Thompson Campbell, Senator John S. Hager and Congressman Joseph P. Hoge, and at events with Gov. John B. Weller. He defended, with Gov. Henry S. Foote, the Vice President of the Republic of Lower California, Col. Watkins, and was himself involved in a duel against a man named Bailie Peyton. He was involved in the case of Senator David C. Broderick, and with Don Salvador Vallejo, brother of Gen. Mariano G. Vallejo. He was an associate of pioneer Frank Turk, and was elected Chairman of the Whig Party committee. He was also one of the Vice Presidents of the Democrats of California during the Civil War, along with Gen. Henry M. Naglee and others.

Charles G. Yale's maternal grandfather was Charles Willey, sea Captain of a Schooner trading food between New York and Florida, who gave land to Jacksonville to build the Old City Cemetery. One of Charles G. Yale's brother was an engineer in Arizona. Another brother, Frank Willey Yale, married to Fannie Amelia Bleecker, of the Bleeckers of Bleecker Street, Manhattan. She was a daughter of Dr. Edward Bleecker of New York, whose father was Major General Leonard Bleecker.

Bleecker was a commander during the American War of Independence along with the Marquis de la Fayette, and was a personal friend of George Washington, whom he escorted during the First Presidential inauguration in 1789. He also cofounded the New York Stock Exchange, being a signatory of the Buttonwood Agreement. Charles G. Yale was the uncle of their only son, Charles Franklin Bleecker of California.

== Career ==
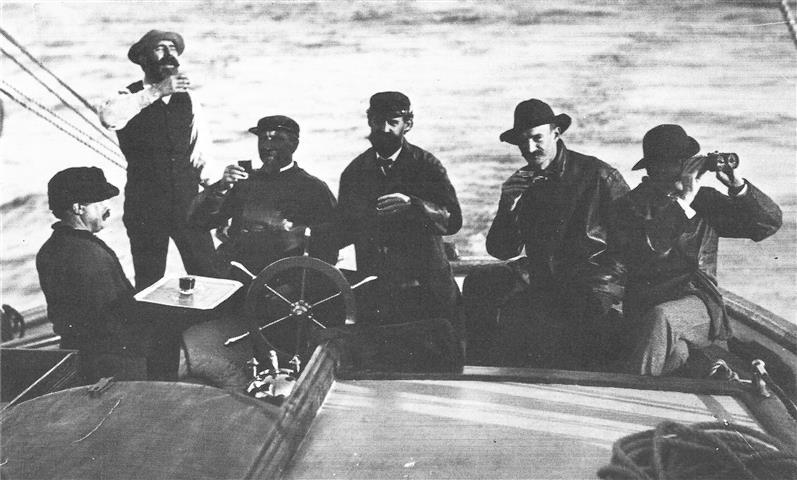
Charles Gregory Yale in the center, yachtman, along with other members of the San Francisco Yacht Club, California

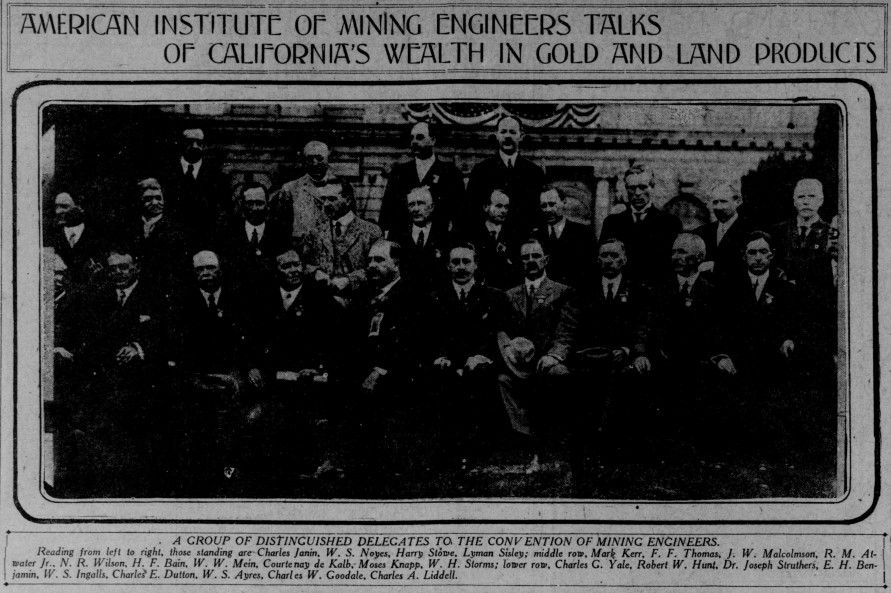
Charles G. Yale with others at the American Institute of Mining Engineers convention of 1911, giving a talk about California's wealth in gold and land products

Yale went to the City College of San Francisco, then started his career as a mining engineer, studying at the University of California on mining and assaying. At the age of 21, he joined the editorial staff of a pioneer mining publication named Mining and Scientific Press, where he stayed for 23 years, and eventually became writer and editor. He then joined the U.S. government as a statistician, playing a leading part in mapping the mineral resources of the Pacific Coast. He was involved in mining investments, opening the Golden Chariot mine in Banner, California, and was involved in the Gold Country region. He was made the statistician of the San Francisco Mint under Frank A. Leach, nominated Director of the United States Mint by Theodore Roosevelt.

He served the country by pushing for the rehabilitation of hydraulic mining, and was the only San Francisco mining representative at the hydraulic miners convention. He represented the miners on the committee and helped them organize a movement, and was helped in the venture by his friend William Chapman Ralston, founder of the Bank of California. Together, and with other leading miners, they founded the San Francisco Miners' Association, and Yale was made its perpetual secretary. The result of their efforts brought the creation of the California Miners Association, which he first presided, with Senator Tirey L. Ford later elected president. At the first convention, while Yale was editor of the Mining and Scientific Press and the miners's representative, he wrote a memorial to Congress to make law changes to the industry, which passed and became the Caminetti law under Congressman Anthony Caminetti.

With Edward H. Benjamin, he took up the matter of conservation and control of flood waters in California, which led to the formation of the California Water and Forest Society, becoming a branch of the Bureau of the Department of the Interior. For four years he was the mining editor of the San Francisco Examiner, belonging to William Randolph Hearst of Hearst Castle, and was sent to the Klondike to describe the gold rush. He became the head of the Pacific division of the Mining Census of 1890 under Dr. David T. Day, and was placed in charge of the San Francisco office of the U.S. Geological Survey as Mining Statistician.

Yale then became secretary of the California Academy of Sciences for a period of 16 years. He was made a member, board director and secretary for 16 years of the San Francisco Yacht Club, now the oldest on the West Coast, under Commodore R. L. Ogden. He also cofounded and was made the first president of the Pacific Inter-Club Yacht Association. The association was founded in San Francisco on May 12, 1896, by five charter yacht clubs, including the San Francisco Yacht Club, in order to improve communication between the clubs, and to provide uniform regional racing rules, encouraging yachting competition and activity.

== Later life ==
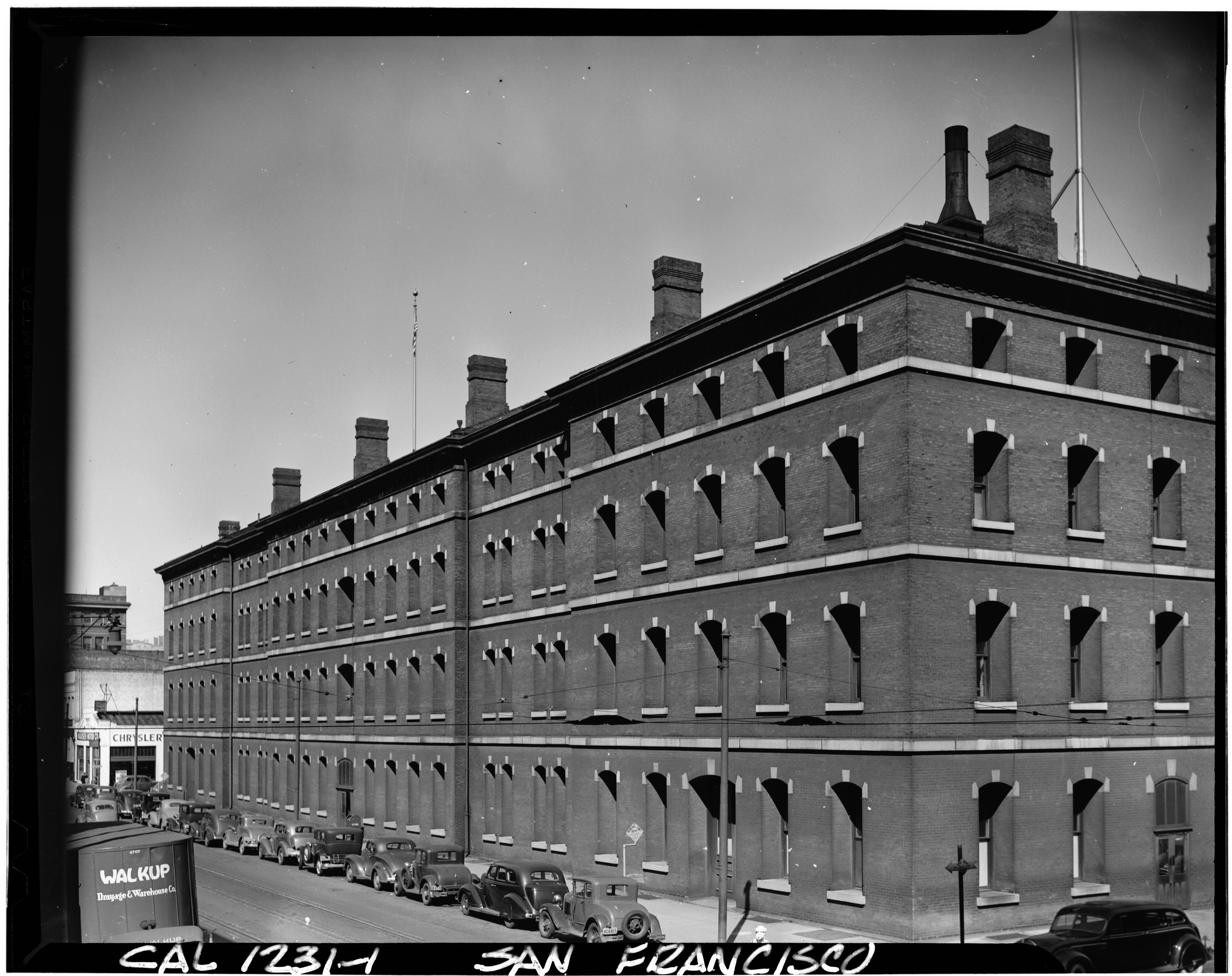
The Appraiser's Building, office of Charles G. Yale during the 1906 San Francisco earthquake

Yale was an honorary life member and librarian of the Bohemian Club of San Francisco. Past members have included newspaper magnate William Randolph Hearst, U.S. President Richard Nixon, artist William Keith, artist Arthur Frank Mathews and artist Edwin Deakin. He was regarded as a well known journalist and official of the US Coast and Geodetic Survey Corps by the club, and helped them negotiate the acquisition of a ship named Casco. He was also a friend of artist Robert Louis Stevenson.

Yale gave a painting of the residence of Samuel Brannan, San Francisco's first millionaire and founder of its first newspaper, the California Star, to Edward Bosqui, another member of the Bohemian Club. He was a contributor to Scientific American, writing an article named "The Gold Deposits of Cape Nome". During the time of the 1906 San Francisco earthquake, Yale was the special geological survey agent on the Pacific Coast, and was near the event in San Francisco at the time. His offices were located in the Appraiser's Building, which wasn't much damaged during the event, allowing him to study its structure and give a report to the director of survey.

One of Yale collaborators was geologist George Davidson, who worked with surveyor Alexander Dallas Bache, of the family of Benjamin Franklin. He was made a special contributor to the Engineering and Mining Journal, and became a member of the California Historical Society. Yale was present as a delegate to the American Institute of Mining Engineers convention of 1911, and gave a talk about California's wealth in gold and land products. He took his retirement in 1923, and the dinner took place in the red room of the Bohemian Club with fellow bohemians.

== Death ==
Yale was the father of Enid Yale, wife of diplomat Wilbur Tirrell Gracey, who was Marshal, U.S. Consul-General at Nanking, China and Hong-Kong, Vice-Deputy Consul at Fuzhou, and U.S. Consul at Seville, Spain and Progreso, Mexico, serving under U.S. President Theodore Roosevelt.

They were the parents of Yale Gracey, an artist who worked for Walt Disney as Disney Imagineering on many projects in California, and was educated at the Art Institute of Chicago. He had another daughter named Etta Arnold, who lived in Shanghai, China.

Charles Gregory Yale died in San Francisco on March 25, 1926, at the age of 78.
