= Charles Yale =

Charles Yale may refer to:

- Charles Dwight Yale (1810–1890), American politician and businessman
- Charles G. Yale (1847–1926), American businessman and yachtman
- Charles H. Yale (1856–1920), American theatre producer and performer

== See also ==
- Charles Yale Harrison (1898–1954), Canadian-American writer and journalist
- Charles Yale Knight (1868–1940), American entrepreneur
