= Anthony Lispenard Bleecker =

United States banker, businessman

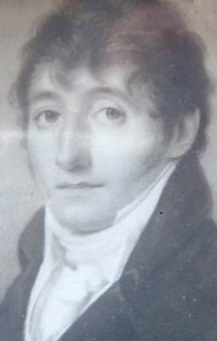
- Born: June 13, 1741; New Rochelle, Province of New York, British America
- Died: April 26, 1816 (aged 74); New York City, US
- Occupations: Banker, businessman
- Known for: Bleecker Street, Lispenard Street
- Spouse: Mary Noel (after 1763)
- Children: Anthony Bleecker
- Relatives: Rutger Jansen Bleecker (grandfather); James W. Bleecker (nephew)

Anthony Lispenard Bleecker (June 13, 1741 – April 26, 1816) was a banker, merchant and auctioneer, and one of the richest men in New York. He worked as well as a vestryman and churchwarden for Trinity Church in Lower Manhattan. He is the namesake for Bleecker Street and Lispenard Street in lower Manhattan.

== Early life ==
Bleecker was born in the town of New Rochelle, New York, to Jacobus Rutger Bleecker and Abigail Lispenard. His mother was the daughter of Anthony Lispenard and granddaughter of Antoine L'Espinard aka Lispenard (1643–1696), La Rochelle-born prominent Huguenot resident of the early years of the English colony of New York.

His brother was Major General Leonard Bleecker, a personal friend of George Washington, and one of the founders of the New York Stock Exchange, through the Buttonwood Agreement.

His maternal uncle was the New York City merchant, politician and landowner Colonel Leonard Lispenard, whose family married with Benjamin Franklin's family (Bache), the Roosevelts and Van Cortlandts.

His paternal grandparents were Albany Mayor Rutger Jansen Bleecker and Catalina (née Schuyler) Bleecker, of the Schuyler family.

His nephew, James W. Bleecker, became the 4th President of the New York Stock Exchange and 1st Treasurer of the Board.

== Career ==
He worked as a shipping merchant and real estate auctioneer in New York City, eventually becoming one of the wealthiest and most powerful men in 18th century New York. He was a Major in the 1st Regiment Provincials under Col. Henry Jackson in 1775.

During the British occupation of New York City, the family lived in New Jersey. When General George Washington returned to Manhattan after the British evacuation in 1783, Bleecker was on the committee to officially welcome him back.

Upon his own return to New York City, Bleecker started the family real estate and auctioning business. By 1792, 'Anthony L. Bleecker and Sons' were listed as stock brokers, and by 1818, members of the Bleecker family occupied 4 of the 28 seats on the New York Stock Exchange. His signature appears on the original list of subscribers of the capital stock for the Manhattan Company, later the Bank of Manhattan Trust Company. The list dates from April 1799.

Bleecker was also involved in New York's historic Trinity Episcopal Church, situated across from Wall Street. He became a vestryman there in 1785. He served until 1807 when he became a warden for five years. He purchased the family vault in its churchyard in 1790 where Bleecker family burials took place well into the 20th century. He was by far the most powerful Bleecker in New York City history.

=== Property ===
He owned the farm where the present-day Bleecker Street in Manhattan lies. His residence was 74 Broadway, across from Rector Street, where the Bleecker family lived for many years. The New York Times obituary of his grandson, Anthony J. Bleecker, (d. 1884) recalled the story of Bleecker coming into his house one day to announce he had bought 160 acres "out in the country" and that his friends laughed at him for wasting his money. That land would eventually become the present day Greenwich Village where Bleecker Street runs today.

The size of his land, and his political and business influence is well documented. However, it is probably the quality of his descendants in the 19th century, and the families they married into, which shows the respect he had. Among the names: Roosevelt, Neilson and Harriman.

== Personal life ==
On May 4, 1763, Bleecker married Mary Noel. Mary, who was born in Cádiz, Spain, was the daughter of Garrat Noel, a member of a distinguished English family that was related to the Earls of Gainsborough, and Frances Matilda (née Jayme) Noel. Together, they were the parents of:

- James Noel Bleecker (1764–1842), married Elizabeth Garland Bache (1762–1795), daughter of Theophylact Bache, Benjamin Franklin's family, along with the Roosevelts and Van Cortlandts
- Frances Bleecker (1766–1839)
- Garret Noel Bleecker (1768–1841)
- Anthony Bleecker (1770–1827)
- Mary Bleecker (1771–1858)
- Alexander Noel Bleecker (1775–1844)
- Abigail Bleecker (1779–1861)
- Elizaberth DeHart Bleeker McDonald (1781–1864)
- Alice Bleecker (1783–1842)
- Jospha Matilda Bleecker (1786–1854)
- Leonard Augustus Bleecker (1786–1841)<

He left a will on November 3, 1814. He died April 26, 1816, and was buried the following day at Trinity Church Cemetery. His will was proven on May 8, 1816, leaving everything to his wife Mary and mentioned sons James, Garrat and Anthony as executors. He and 25 other members of the Bleecker family remain interred in a private vault under Trinity Church.

== Bleecker family ==
Members of the Bleecker family include :

- Jan Jansen Bleecker (1641/42-1732), Dutch settler in New Netherland, Mayor of New York
- Johannes Bleecker Jr. (1668–1738), colonial merchant, fur trader, Commissioners for Indian Affairs
- Rutger Jansen Bleecker (1675–1756), colonial merchant, married to a member of the Schuyler family
- Ann Eliza Bleecker (1752–1783), American poet, fled during the American Revolution
- Anthony Bleecker (1770–1827), American author and lawyer, friend of Washington Irving
- Harmanus Bleecker (1779–1849), US Congressman from New York, Ambassador to the Netherlands
- James W. Bleecker (1787–1864), 4th President of the New York Stock Exchange
- George W. Bleecker (1800–1859), N.Y. state politician, father was personal friend of George Washington
- Leon Bleecker (c.1881–1933), New York State assemblyman and politician
- Katherine Russell Bleecker (1893–1996), American filmmaker in silent era
- Maitland B. Bleecker (1903–2002), American inventor, instrumental in modern helicopter design
- Julian Bleecker (born ca. 1967), American mobile artist and technologist
