= Rutger Jansen Bleecker =

American merchant and political figure

Mayor of Albany, New York
- In office November 8, 1726 – November 10, 1729
- Governor: William Burnet
- Preceded by: Johannes Cuyler
- Succeeded by: Johannes de Peyster III

Recorder of Albany, New York
- In office 1725–1726
- Governor: William Burnet

Personal details
- Born: May 13, 1675; Albany, Province of New York
- Died: August 4, 1756 (aged 81); Albany, Province of New York
- Spouse: Catalina Schuyler (m. 1712; died 1747)
- Parent(s): Jan Jansen Bleecker; Grietje Rutse van Schoenderwoert
- Relatives: Johannes Bleecker, Jr. (brother); Anthony Lispenard Bleecker (grandson)

Rutger Jansen Bleecker or Rutger Bleecker (May 13, 1675 – August 4, 1756) was a colonial era merchant and political figure who served as Mayor of Albany, New York from 1726 to 1729.

== Early life ==
Bleecker was born in Albany in on May 13, 1675. He was the second son of Dutch born mayor Jan Jansen Bleecker (1641–1732) and Grietje "Margaret" Rutse van Schoenderwoert (1647–1733). His siblings included Johannes Bleecker, Jr. (1668–1738) Caajte Grietje Bleecker (1670–1734), who married Abraham Cuyler (1665–1747), a brother of Mayor Johannes Cuyler, Jannetje Janse Bleecker (1673–1755), who married Johannes Jacobse Glen (1675–1706), Margarita Bleecker (1680–1773), who married Hendrick Ten Eyck (1680–1772), Hendrick Bleecker (1686–1767) and Rachael Bleecker (1688–1766).

His maternal grandparents were Rutger Jacobson van Schoenderwoert (1615–1665) and Tryntje Jansen (née Van Breestede) (1625–1711).

== Career ==
Following after his father and older brother, Bleecker was a fur merchant. In 1725, he became Recorder (Deputy Mayor) of the City.

In 1726, Bleecker was appointed Mayor on behalf of the English crown by Governor, William Burnet, succeeding Johannes Cuyler and commencing on November 8, 1726. He served until November 10, 1729v, when he was succeeded by Johannes de Peyster III. Also in 1701, he was elected to serve for one year as a member of the New York Provincial Assembly, until 1702.

In 1728, he was first appointed to the Commissioners of Indian Affairs, serving for a total of seventeen years with additional appointments in 1729, 1732, 1734, 1739, 1742, and 1745.

== Personal life ==
On May 26, 1712, Bleecker married Catalina Schuyler (1678–1747), the widow of former mayor Johannes Abeel, with whom she had five children. She was the daughter of David Pieterse Schuyler (1636–1690) and Catharina Verplanck (1639–1690), who both died during the Schenectady massacre of 1690, and the sister of Albany mayors, David Davidse Schuyler (1669–1715) and Myndert Schuyler (1672–1755). Together, they were the parents of four children, including:

- Johannes "John" Rutger Bleecker (1713–1800), who married Elizabeth Staats (1725–1811), daughter of Barent and Neetltje Gerritse (née Van den Berg) Staats, in 1743.
- Margarita "Margaret" Bleecker (1714–1760), who married Edward Collins (1704–1753), son of Lt. John Collins and Margaret (née Schuyler) Ver Planck Collins, a widow of Jacobus "James" Ver Planck, in 1733.
- Jacobus "James" Bleecker (b. 1716), who married Abigail Lispenard (1718–1807), daughter of Anthony Lispenard and granddaughter of Antoine L'Espinard, in 1740.
- Myndert Bleecker (b. 1720).

Bleecker died in Albany on August 4, 1756. He was buried at the Dutch church in Albany.

=== Descendants ===
Through his son Jacobus, he was the grandfather of Anthony Lispenard Bleecker (1741–1816), the prominent banker, merchant and auctioneer for whom Bleecker Street in lower Manhattan is named.

The town of Bleecker, New York was named in honor of his grandson through his son John Barent Bleecker (1760–1841).

Political offices
Preceded by Johannes Cuyler	Mayor of Albany, New York; 1726–1729	Succeeded by Johannes de Peyster III
