= Princess Amelia (1634 ship) =

Princess Amelia was a Dutch merchant ship of 38 guns and 600 tons (bm) built in 1634 and wrecked off Swansea, Bristol Channel, in 1647. She served the Dutch West India Company and was one of the largest merchant ships of her day with 38 guns.

During her 1647 arrival to and departure from New Netherland, her captain was Jan Claesen Bol, who was 28 at the time. The ship carried Petrus Stuyvesant, the new Director-General of New Netherland, his wife Judith Bayard, and Stuyvesant’s councilors to Manhattan, where they landed May 1647. During her time in port, Captain Bol sat in council with Stuyvesant and others in New Amsterdam.

When she sailed from Manhattan to Amsterdam on 16 August 1647, she was loaded with 200,000 pounds of dyewood from Curaçao and around 14,000 beaver pelts. It was also carrying 107 passengers and crew, including the recently fired Director Willem Kieft for his return to Amsterdam. He was returning to defend himself against the charges leveled by among others, the Rev. Everardus Bogardus (the colony’s principal Dutch Reformed dominie), and banished colonists Jochem Pietersen Kuyter and Cornelis Melyn, who would also have to answer charges of insubordination for their role in Kieft’s ouster. The other passengers included numerous Dutch West India Company soldiers who had recently arrived in Manhattan from Brazil and the Caribbean.

On 27 September 1647, Captain Bol mistook the Bristol Channel for the English Channel and ran Princess Amelia aground off Mumbles Point, Wales, near Swansea, Wales, (51.573°N 3.9992°W) where she broke apart. Twenty-one of the 107 passengers survived, including Kuyter and Melyn, who later reported that Kieft had acknowledged his administrative mistakes before drowning. The Rev. Bogardus, Melyn's son, and most of the soldiers also drowned.

Insurance claims and lawsuits over the loss claims lasted for years.

Early popular sources describe the event thus:

Kieft returned to Holland in a ship that was packed from stem to stern with the finest of furs. The ship was wrecked at sea. Kieft was drowned, and the furs were lost. In the same ship was Everardus Bogardus (the minister who had married Annetje Jans), who was on his way to Holland on a mission relating to his church. The people of New Amsterdam mourned for their minister, but there was little sorrow felt for the Governor who had plunged the colony in war by his obstinate and cruel temper.

Some of the furs on board came ashore in Swansea Bay and were sold off in their bundles for bargain prices. Kuyter and Melyn were found not guilty of insubordination and later returned to their families in New Amsterdam. Two cannon, small arms, and silver coins were salvaged from the wreck by Squire Mansel but were lost on Rhossili beach before they got to his home of Henllys, Llandewi, Gower.
