= Theophylact Bache =

American merchant

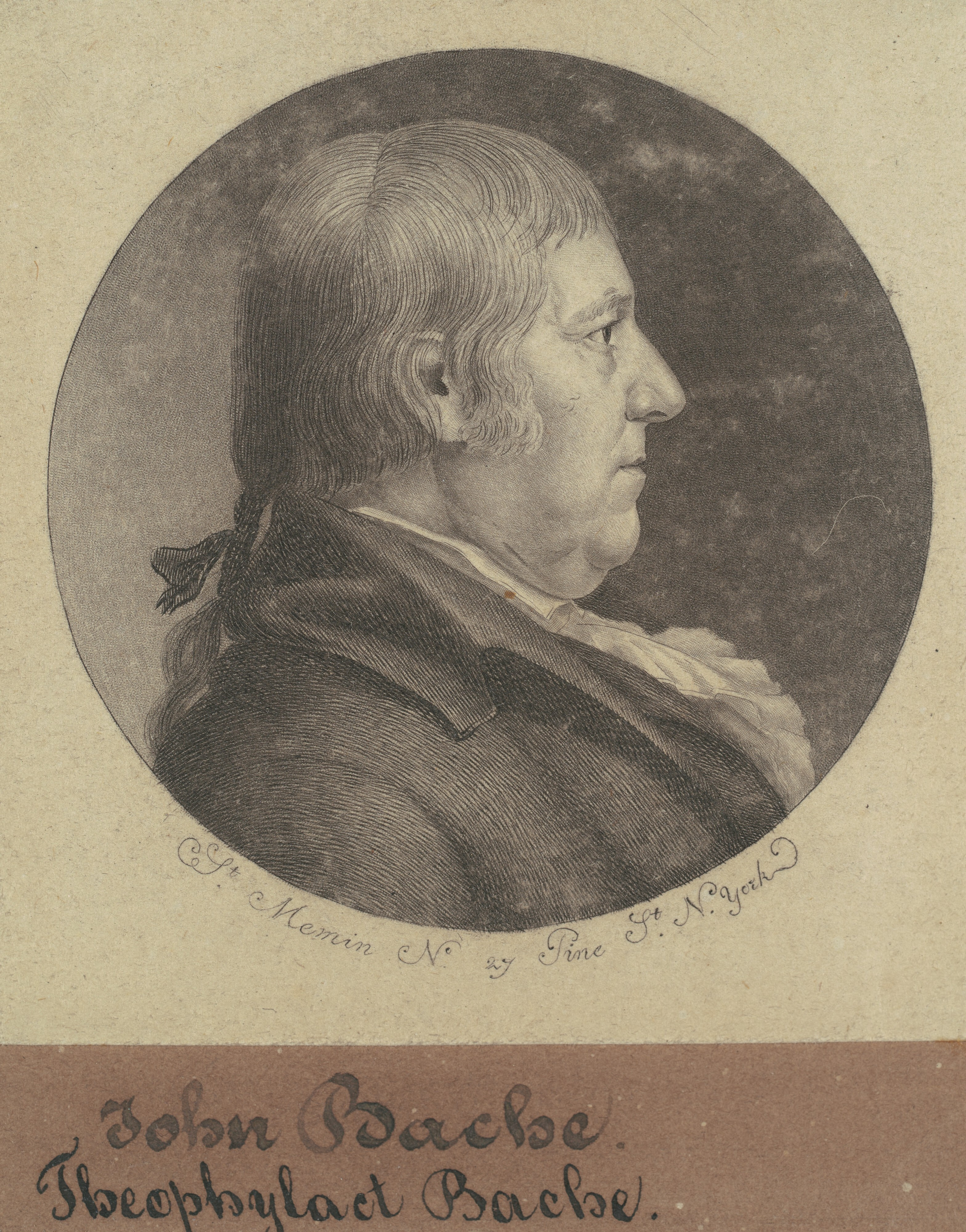
- Portrait of Bache by Charles Balthazar Julien Févret de Saint-Mémin
- Born: 17 January 1734; Settle, North Yorkshire
- Died: 30 October 1807 (aged 73); New York City, New York
- Occupation: Merchant
- Spouse: Ann Dorothea Barclay
- Relatives: Richard Bache (brother); Bache McEvers (grandson)

Theophylact Bache (/θiːˈɒfɪˌlækt ˈbiːtʃ/ thee-OFF-ih-lakt BEECH; January 17, 1735 – October 30, 1807) was an American merchant and fifth president of the New York Chamber of Commerce.

== Early life ==
Theophylact Bache was born on January 17, 1735 in Settle, in the West Riding of Yorkshire, England. He was the son of William Bache, a tax collector, and Mary (née Blechynden) Bache, who were married around 1720. His younger brother, Richard Bache, was the second Postmaster General of the United States and the son-in-law of Benjamin Franklin.

== Career ==
He landed in New York 17 September 1751, took charge of the business of Paul Richard a successful merchant and former mayor, whose wife was a Bache relative. Richard died in 1756, and Bache became the owner of merchant vessels, and engaged in privateering. He was identified with American resistance to England in 1765, and in 1770 was one of the committee to carry out the resolutions of non-intercourse.

In 1774, he was one of the committee of correspondence appointed when the port of Boston was closed. He supported the first Continental Congress; but when the American Revolutionary War actually began he remained so far neutral as to incur the suspicions of the committee of safety. He remained in New York during the British occupation of the city, and befriended American officers held there as prisoners of war. In 1777 he was chosen the fifth president of the New York Chamber of Commerce.

== Personal life ==
Bache was married to Ann Dorothea Barclay (1741–1795), one of eleven children of merchant Andrew Barclay and Helen (née Roosevelt) Barclay. Among her siblings was Catherine Barclay (wife of Augustus Van Cortlandt), and Sarah Ann Barclay (wife of Anthony Lispenard). Together, they were the parents of:

- Elizabeth Garland Bache (1762–1795), who married James Noel Bleecker, the eldest son of Anthony Lispenard Bleecker.
- Mary Bache (b. 1766), who married Charles McEvers Jr.
- Paul Richard Bache (1767–1801), who married his cousin, Helen Roosevelt Lispenard, a daughter of Anthony Lispenard.
- Andrew Barclay Bache (1770–1847), who married Charlotte Phillips.
- Anna Dorothea Bache (1771–1814), who married her cousin, Col. Leonard Lispenard, a son of Anthony Lispenard, in 1790.
- William Bache (1773–1813), who married Christina Cooper.
- Sarah Elizabeth Bache (1774–1852), who married James Noel Bleecker, after the death of her elder sister, in 1795.
- Catharine Thomas Bache (1776–1854), who married William Satterthwaite.
- Helena Bache (1780–1802), who died unmarried.

Bache died on 30 October 1807.

=== Descendants ===
Through his daughter Mary, he was a grandfather of Sarah Barclay McEvers (the wife of Robert Montgomery Livingston, a grandson of Judge Robert Livingston) and Bache McEvers (1798–1851), was an American commission merchant, shipper, and insurer.
