= Albert Janse Ryckman =

American businessman and politician

Captain Albert Janse Ryckman

Mayor of Albany, New York
- In office 1702–1703
- Preceded by: Johannes Bleecker, Jr.
- Succeeded by: Johannes Schuyler

Personal details
- Born: ca. 1642 Albany, New York
- Died: January 12, 1737
- Spouse: Cornelia Quackenbush
- Children: 12
- Parent(s): Jan Janse; Catharina van de Woestijne

Albert Janse Ryckman (c. 1642 – 1737) was an 18th-century American businessman and politician who served as the 9th Mayor of Albany from 1702 to 1703.

== Early life ==
Ryckman was born in 1642 to Beverwyck pioneers Jan and Catharina Janse. After his father's death, his mother, Tryntje Janse, married Eldert Gerbertse Cryff.

== Career ==
In a court document dated Albany, June 2, 1675, he signed as Albert Janse Ryckman, he declared that he had made a contract with Stephanus Van Cortlandt, the director of Renesellaerswyck, with the consent of Jans Hendrickse Bruyn, for two mortgages which Bruyn holds against Eldert Gerbertse Cruyff, his step-father. Albert promises to pay the mortgages in good beaver skin in installments, in 1676 and 1677, the mortgages amounting to 399 guilders and 4 stivers with interest at 10%. A footnote by Pearson states that Captain Albert Janse Ryckman was a brewer and indicates that his house was on the south corner of Hudson St. and Broadway. Ryckman was considered one of the most prominent Albany brewers of his time and became quite adept at business and politicking. In 1686, he was appointed to the first city council of Albany as an Alderman. Ryckman made connections and increased his family's notoriety until his appointment as Mayor in 1702. He was a Captain in the Albany Militia. Living until his nineties, Captain Ryckman always considered himself an "Albany County brewer."

In 1690, he assisted in taking of an inventory of the estate of Jan Cock, a young man killed by a cannon at Fort Albany on the February 9, 1690 after the Schenectady massacre. Ryckman and Jan Lansing, also an alderman of Albany, made the inventory."

In 1703, Marten Cornelissen Van Buren writes his will and makes Albert Ryckman and Dirck Wessels the guardians of his sons Peter and Marte, which was written on April 10, 1703.

== Personal life ==
In the mid-1660s, he was married to Neeltje "Cornelia" Quackenbush, with whom he eventually had twelve children, of whom nine were living and spoken of in his will made in 1736, including:

- Marytje Ryckman
- James Ryckman
- Hannah Ryckman
- David Ryckman
- William Ryckman
- Johannes Ryckman
- Pieter Ryckman, who married Cornelia Keteltas
- Albert Ryckman, Jr.

Ryckman was also known to have purchased a few properties with the payment to be received in the form of beaverskin.

He was buried January 12, 1737, and his wife on October 17 the following year.

=== Legacy ===
Ryckman Hall on the University at Albany campus is named after Albert Janse Ryckman. "

== See also ==
- History of Albany, New York
- Reformed Church in America

Political offices
Preceded by Johannes Bleecker, Jr.	Mayor of Albany, New York; 1702–1703	Succeeded by Johannes Schuyler
