= Everardus Bogardus =

Dutch American clergy

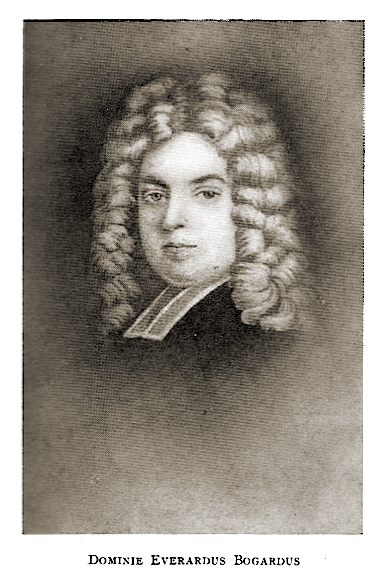

2nd Dominie of the New Amsterdam Dutch Reformed Church
- In office 1633–1647

Personal details
- Born: 27 July 1607 Netherlands
- Died: 27 September 1647 (aged 40) Swansea, Wales
- Spouse: Anneke Jans (m. 1638)
- Children: 4
- Parents: Willem Jansz Bogaert; Susanna Adriaensdr van Ruyteveld
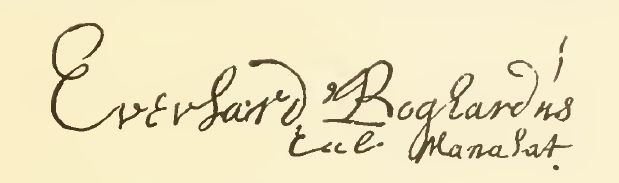
- Signature

Everardus Bogardus (27 July 1607 – 27 September 1647) was the dominie of the New Netherlands, and was the second minister of the Dutch Reformed Church, the oldest established church in present-day New York, which was then located on Pearl Street at its first location built in 1633, the year of his arrival. Bogardus was, in fact, the second clergyman in all of the New Netherlands. (The slightly obscure early history of the Dutch colony meant that he was often considered the first clergyman.)

== Early life in the Netherlands ==
Bogardus was born in Woerden, in the province of Utrecht, Holland in 1607. He entered Leyden University for the study of theology in July, 1627. On 11 January 1632, just five years after he had entered Leyden University, he was ordained a regular minister of the Dutch Reformed church. Soon after he was commissioned by the "Lords Directors of the Honorable West India Company of the United Provinces of the Netherlands," to minister to the spiritual needs of the colony at New Amsterdam.

== Life in New Netherland ==
Bogardus arrived in New Netherland in 1633, sailing from Amsterdam on the ship "Zoutberg". When it became known that Kiliaen van Rensselaer planned to erect a church upriver at Rensselaerswyck, Governor Kieft hastened his plans to rebuild the church in Fort Amsterdam.

A humorous anecdote about the building of this church contends that

Governor Kieft decided that there should be [a new church] of stone, and that it should be built inside the fort. There was a question as how to secure the money to build it. Kieft gave a small amount, as did other colonists, but there was not enough. Fortunately, just at this time, a daughter of Bogardus, the minister, was married. At the wedding, when the guests were in good humor, a subscription-list was handed out. The guests tried to outdo one another in subscribing money for the new church. Next day some of the subscribers were sorry they had agreed to give so much, but the Governor accepted no excuses and insisted on the money. It was collected, and the church was built.

Bogardus frequently was combative with the Directors of New Netherland and their management of the Dutch West India Company colony, going up against the often-drunk Wouter van Twiller and famously denouncing Willem Kieft from the pulpit during the colony's disastrously bloody Kieft's War (1643–1645). He stepped up his denouncements when Kieft tried to place a tax on beer.

== Death ==
Bogardus died September 27, 1647, in the Princess Amelia shipwreck near Swansea, Wales, while en route to Amsterdam along with many of his congregants as well as his opponent Willem Kieft, himself. Popular sources describe Bogardus... "on his way to Holland on a mission relating to his church. The people of New Amsterdam mourned for their minister, but there was little sorrow felt for the Governor who had plunged the colony in war by his obstinate and cruel temper."

== Legacy ==
Prominent members of that family included James Bogardus, who pioneered in the construction of cast-iron buildings during the 1840s. Bogardus Place is located in the Washington Heights section of New York City borough of Manhattan (ZIP code 10040). It was opened in 1912, and runs one block (641.7 feet) between Hillside Avenue and Ellwood Street, and is named for the family who previously owned much of the land that forms both Fort Tryon Park, and the Fort Tryon section.
