= Frank Turk =

American jurist

Frank Turk (1817/18 – July 15, 1887) was an American politician, jurist and entrepreneur. He was noted as a pioneer of the city of San Francisco, California, and Turk Street there was named after him.

He was born in Stamford, Connecticut, and studied law in New York City. He worked in New York City post office under John Lorimer Graham. While in New York he belonged to the New York Knickerbockers, the original modern baseball club, and with fellow Knickerbocker Alexander Cartwright traveled to San Francisco in 1849 as part of the California Gold Rush; he is credited with Cartwright for bringing the game of baseball to San Francisco. Working in the San Francisco Post Office here under John W. Geary. In August 1849 Frank Turk was elected Vice Alcalde (vice mayor) of San Francisco with John W. Geary as First Alcade. Frank Turk also practiced law, and had as partners at various times Hall McAllister, Mr. Lippitt and J. K. Rose. At one time Frank Turk owned nearly the whole of Nob Hill and a large part of the Rancho de las Pulgas, San Mateo county.
