= Russell H. Nevins =

5th President of the New York Stock Exchange
- In office 1830–1831
- Preceded by: James W. Bleecker
- Succeeded by: John Ward

Personal details
- Born: Russell Hubbard Nevins; January 10, 1785 Norwich, Connecticut, U.S.
- Died: November 27, 1854 (aged 69) New York City, U.S.
- Occupation: Banker

Russell Hubbard Nevins (January 10, 1785 – November 27, 1854) was an American banker and the president of the New York Stock Exchange.

== Early life ==
Nevins was born on January 10, 1785, in Norwich, Connecticut. He was a son of David Nevins of Norwich and the former Mary Hubbard of Lyme, Connecticut. Among his siblings were brothers Henry and Rufus Nevins and younger sister, Elizabeth Nevis, who was married to fellow banker Elihu Townsend.

== Career ==
He was a founding partner, with his brother-in-law Elihu Townsend, of the Wall Street brokerage firm Nevins, Townsend & Co. From 1830 to 1831, he served as the fifth president of the New York Stock Exchange.

Nevins also invested in real estate, developing the Boerum Hill neighborhood of Brooklyn with Charles Hoyt.

== Personal life ==
Nevins died unmarried in New York City on November 27, 1854, and was originally interred at New York Marble Cemetery. He was later re-interred at Green-Wood Cemetery in Brooklyn.

=== Honors and legacy ===
There is a street named for Russell H. Nevins that crosses the Brooklyn neighborhood of Boerum Hill, and the IRT Eastern Parkway Line of the New York City Subway (2, 3, 4, and 5 trains) serve Nevins Street station.
