= Bogardus Place =

Street in Manhattan, New York

Coordinates: 40°51′33″N 73°55′45″W

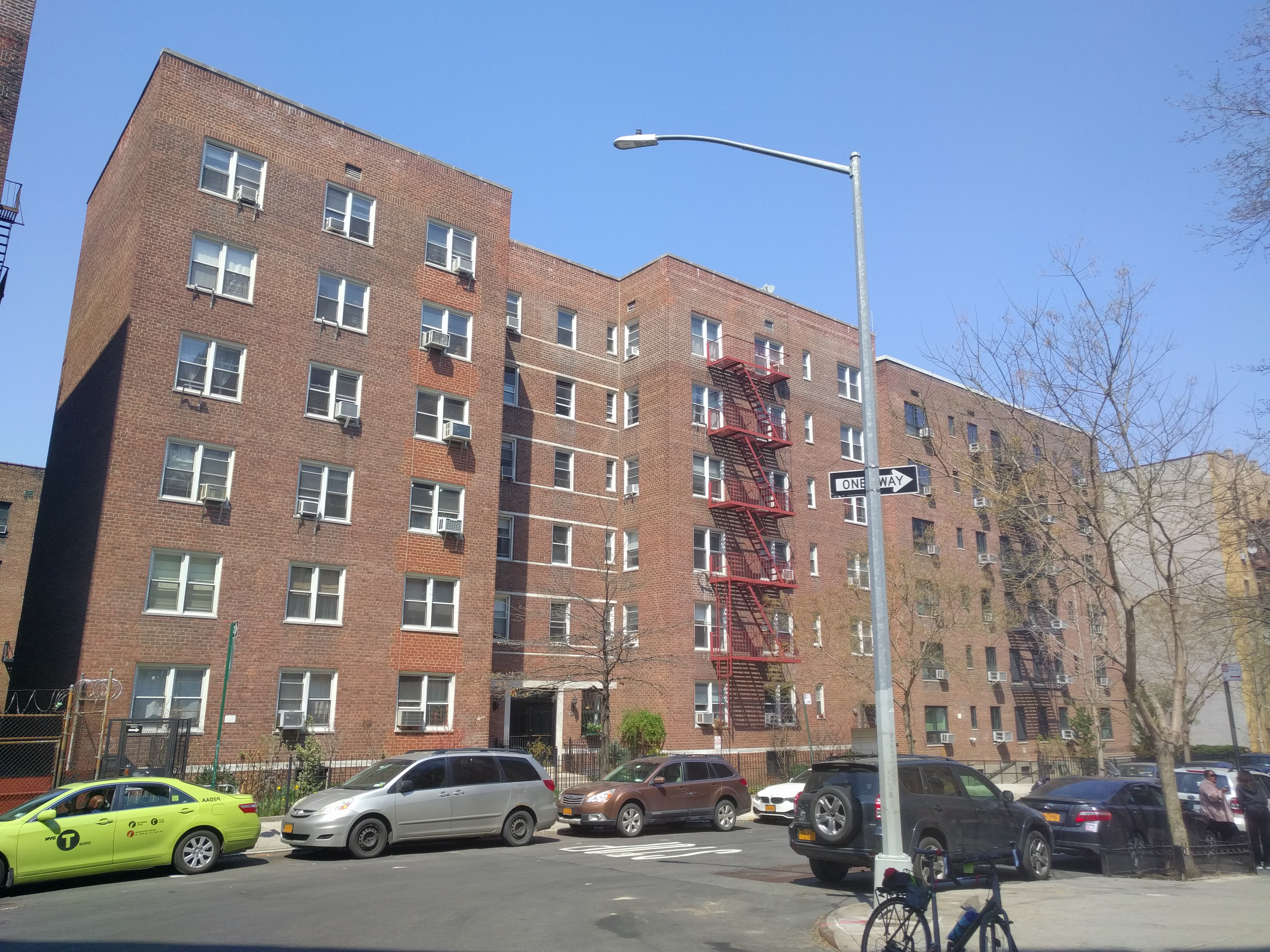
West end of Bogardus Place in the Inwood section of Manhattan

Bogardus Place is located in the Inwood section of New York City borough of Manhattan. The one-block street was opened in 1912, and runs 642 feet (196 m) between Hillside Avenue and Ellwood Street, and is named for the family who previously owned much of the land that forms both Fort Tryon Park, and the Fort Tryon section.

The Bogardus family in America started in 1633, when Everardus Bogardus arrived in New Amsterdam to become that community's second clergyman. Prominent members of that family included James Bogardus, who pioneered in the construction of cast-iron buildings during the 1840s.
