= Katherine Russell Bleecker =

American filmmaker (1893–1996)

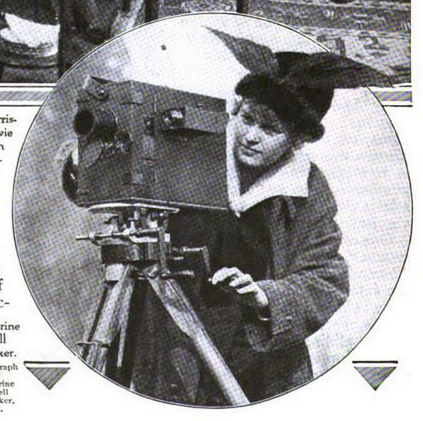
Katherine Russell Bleecker with camera, from a 1916 publication.

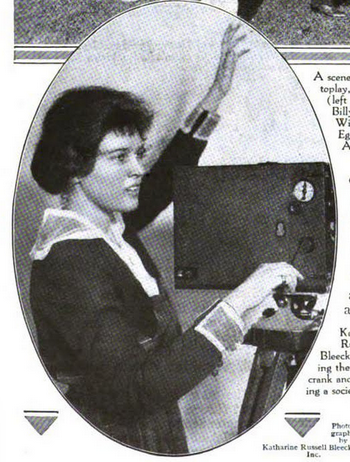
Katherine Russell Bleecker with camera, from a 1916 publication.

Katherine Russell Bleecker (May 5, 1893 – February 1, 1996), later in life Katherine Bleecker Meigs and later still Katherine B. Jobson, was an American filmmaker in the silent film era. She is sometimes credited as the first professional camerawoman in American film.

== Early life ==
Katherine Russell Bleecker was born in New York, the daughter of Russell Bleecker and Emily Fisk Blunt Bleecker.

== Career ==
Katherine Bleecker was a pioneering professional camerawoman, who used her own personal camera equipment. She made three documentary films for the Joint Committee on Prison Reform, on location at New York state prisons, Sing Sing, Auburn, and Great Meadow: A Day in Sing Sing (1915), A Prison Without Walls (1915), and Within Prison Walls (1915). The films were used in lectures about prison conditions and prison reform.

"I've had a varied experience with my pictures," she explained. "I've been up in a flying machine, have taken from tugboats and automobiles, and always there are plenty of bystanders ready and eager to jump in and play mob or be shot." In 1916 she directed "Man and Millionaire", a film scenario written for a contest in The Pittsburgh Press. In 1918 she completed Madame Spy, a film starring Jack Mulhall, Wadsworth Harris, George Gebhardt and Claire Du Brey. She also advertised her services as available for documenting "children and social events ... factories and machinery." She filmed the 1918 Memorial Day parade in Nutley, New Jersey.

She also made some of the first "society films," a novelty version of club theatricals, with titles including The Perils of Society, Skeins of Destiny, The Flame of Kapthur, The Smuggler's Revenge, Gloria, A Question of Fortune and A Romance by the Sea. Bleecker would create the film, with wealthy amateurs playing the roles for their friends' entertainment or for fundraising events.

Bleecker was manager of a movie theatre in New York in 1918, when her predecessor went to war. "I am going to prove that theater managing is like housekeeping – a woman's job", she quipped. Also during World War I, she made films for the American Red Cross.

== Later life ==
Bleecker married businessman Willis Noel Meigs in 1918. They had a son Henry Meigs II (1921-2014), who became a judge, and a daughter Elizabeth Bleecker Meigs Averell (1923-1957), who became a children's book author. The Meigses divorced in 1939. As Katherine Bleecker Meigs, she started an etiquette advice service by telegraph, scheduling bouquet deliveries, and even providing chaperones by request. She also lectured on etiquette at Hunter College in 1937 and 1938. Katherine Bleecker Meigs was president of the New York League of Business and Professional Women in the 1930s.

She remarried, to insurance executive Alfred Pears Jobson. During World War II she organized radio broadcasts for child refugees to speak on the air to their parents abroad. In 1943, she was appointed chair of Vocational Services for the Civilian Activities Division of Army Emergency Relief, tasked with finding jobs for the wives and mothers of soldiers. She was widowed when Jobson died in 1974. Katherine Bleecker Jobson died in early 1996, aged 102 years. Her estate of over $2 million was donated to establish scholarships and the Alfred P. and Katherine B. Jobson Professorship at Centre College in Kentucky; her son Henry Meigs II was a trustee of the school.
