= Johannes Bleecker Jr. =

American merchant and politician

Member of the New York General Assembly
- In office 1701–1702

Mayor of Albany, New York
- In office 1701–1702
- Governor: John Nanfan
- Preceded by: Jan Jansen Bleecker
- Succeeded by: Albert Janse Ryckman

Recorder of Albany, New York
- In office 1700–1701
- Governor: Earl of Bellomont

Personal details
- Born: 1668; Albany, Province of New York
- Died: December 20, 1738 (aged 69–70); Albany, Province of New York
- Spouse: Antje Coster (m. 1693)
- Children: 9
- Parent(s): Jan Jansen Bleecker; Grietje Rutse van Schoenderwoert
- Relatives: Rutger Bleecker (brother)

Johannes Bleecker Jr. (1668 — December 20, 1738) was a colonial era merchant and political figure who served as Mayor of Albany, New York.

== Early life ==
Bleecker was born in Albany in 1668. He was the eldest son of Dutch born Jan Jansen Bleecker (1641–1732) and Grietje "Margaret" Rutse van Schoenderwoert (1647–1733). His siblings included Caajte Grietje Bleecker (1670–1734), who married Abraham Cuyler (1665–1747), a brother of Mayor Johannes Cuyler, Jannetje Janse Bleecker (1673–1755), who married Johannes Jacobse Glen (1675–1706), Rutger Jansen Bleecker (1675–1756), who also served as Mayor and who married Catalina Schuyler (1678–1747), Margarita Bleecker (1680–1773), who married Hendrick Ten Eyck (1680–1772), Hendrick Bleecker (1686–1767) and Rachael Bleecker (1688–1766).

His maternal grandparents were Rutger Jacobson van Schoenderwoert (1615–1665) and Tryntje Jansen (née Van Breestede) (1625–1711).

== Career ==
Following after his father, Bleecker was a fur trader and merchant. During the winter of 1686 to 1687, Bleecker, then 18 and considered an Indian interpreter, accompanied Patrick McGregory in an attempt to establish trade with the Ottawa people. While in the wilderness, he was taken prisoner by the Seneca and French and taken to Montreal. A year later, he released by the French governor and returned to Albany.

He was known for accepting patronage from the Jacob Leisler, known for Leisler's Rebellion.

Bleecker served on the City Council during the 1690s and was an officer in the Albany Militia. In 1700, when his father became Mayor, he was also appointed Recorder (Deputy Mayor) of the City by the Colonial Gov., Richard Coote, 1st Earl of Bellomont.

In 1701, Bleecker was appointed Mayor by Acting Governor, John Nanfan, and he served until 1702, when he was succeeded by Albert Janse Ryckman. Also in 1701, he was elected to serve for one year as a member of the New York Provincial Assembly, until 1702. In 1720, he was appointed to the Commissioners of Indian Affairs, serving for a total of four years.

== Personal life ==
On October 29, 1693, Bleecker was married to Antje "Anna" Coster (1679–1766). She was the daughter of Hendrick and Geertje (née Van Schaick) Coster. Together, they were the parents of nine children, including:

- Johannes Bleecker (1694–1757), who married Jannetje Ten Eyck (1705–1738), daughter of Barent and Neeltje (née Schermerhorn) Ten Eyck, in 1724. After her death, he married Eva Bries (d. 1752), in 1741.
- Geertruy Bleecker (1696–1786), who married Abraham Evert Wendell (1693–1753), son of Evert Wendell (1660–1702) in 1736.
- Hendrick Bleecker (b. 1699)
- Nicolaas "Nicholas" Bleecker (1702–1751), who married Margarita Roseboom (1706–1794), daughter of Johannes and Gerritje (née Coster) Roseboom, in 1728.
- Hendrick Bleecker (1706–1724), who died while among the Seneca Indians.
- Margarita Bleecker (b. 1709), who married Gerrit Marselis (b. 1698), son of Gysbert and Barbara (née Groesbeck) Marselis, in 1730.
- Anna Bleecker (b. 1712)
- Jacob Bleecker (1715–1747), who married his first cousin Margaret Ten Eyck (1715–1777), daughter of Hendrick and Margarita (née Bleecker) Ten Eyck, in 1745.
- Anthony Bleecker (b. 1718).

Bleecker died in Albany on December 20, 1738. He was buried at the Dutch church in Albany. After his death, his widow remarried to Johannes Lansing.

Political offices
Preceded by Jan Jansen Bleecker	Mayor of Albany, New York; 1701–1702	Succeeded by Albert Janse Ryckman
