= Jan Jansen Bleecker =

Dutch merchant and politician

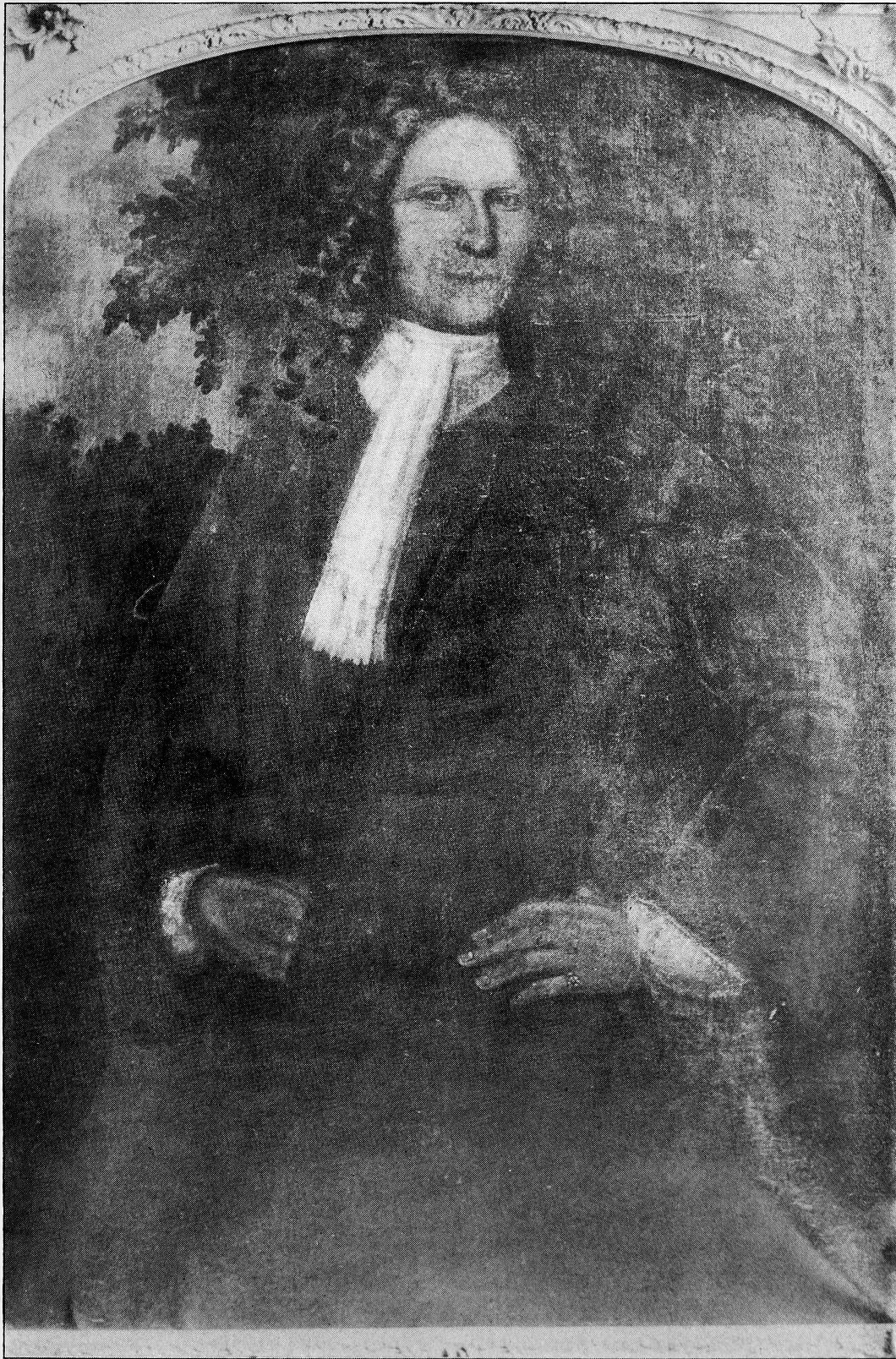

Mayor of Albany
- In office 1700–1701
- Preceded by: Pieter Van Brugh
- Succeeded by: Johannes Bleecker, Jr.

Personal details
- Born: July 9, 1641; Meppel, County of Drenthe, Republic of the Seven United Netherlands
- Died: November 21, 1732 (aged 91); Albany, Province of New York
- Spouse: Grietje Rutse van Schoenderwoert (m. 1667–1732)
- Children: 10, including Johannes, Rutger
- Parent: Jan Bleecker

Jan Jansen Bleecker (July 9, 1641 — November 21, 1732) was a colonial era merchant and political figure who served as Mayor of Albany, New York.

== Early life ==
Jan Jansen Bleecker was born in Meppel, Drenthe, Netherlands on July 9, 1641, and was the first of his family to come to North America. He was the son of Jan Bleecker.

== Career ==
Coat of Arms of Jan Jansen Bleecker

In 1658, he emigrated to New Amsterdam (now New York City), and shortly thereafter he moved to Beverwyck (now Albany). Bleecker became a successful trader and merchant, and was also involved in land speculation.

When Albany received its city charter in 1686, Bleecker was appointed the first City Chamberlain (treasurer). In 1689 he was also appointed Captain of the Albany Militia.

When Jacob Leisler led a rebellion against British authority in New York from 1689 to 1691, Albany was a stronghold of anti-Leisler opposition. Bleecker served as a member of the Albany convention that attempted to convince Leisler to allow British military supplies to move north from New York City in anticipation of a French attack from Canada. (These events took place during King William's War.)

Bleecker was a member of New York's provincial assembly from 1698 to 1701. He also served as an Alderman, and was City Recorder (deputy mayor) from 1696 to 1700. He was appointed several times as a Justice of the Peace.

In 1700, Bleecker was appointed Mayor, and he served until 1701 when he was succeeded by his son, Johannes Bleecker, Jr.

One of the tracts of land Bleecker came to own in partnership with several others was the Saratoga patent. Bleecker's portion included what later came to be known as Bemis Heights, the site of the Battles of Saratoga in the American Revolution.

== Personal life ==
On January 2, 1667, Bleecker was married to Grietje "Margaret" Rutse van Schoenderwoert (1647–1733), the daughter of Rutger Jacobson van Schoenderwoert (1615–1665) and Tryntje Jansen (née Van Breestede) (1625–1711). Together, they were the parents of:

- Johannes Bleecker, Jr. (1668–1738), who served as Mayor of Albany who married Antje Coster (1679–1766).
- Caajte Grietje Bleecker (1670–1734), who married Abraham Cuyler (1665–1747), a brother of Johannes Cuyler.
- Jannetje Janse Bleecker (1673–1755), who married Johannes Jacobse Glen (1675–1706).
- Rutger Jansen Bleecker (1675–1756), who also served as Mayor and who married Catalina Schuyler (1678–1747), daughter of David Pieterse Schuyler (1636–1690), and widow of Johannes Abeel.
- Nicolas Bleecker (1677–1751)
- Margarita Bleecker (1680–1773), who married Hendrick Ten Eyck (1680–1772), son of Jacob Coenraedtsen Ten Eyck and uncle to Jacob Coenraedt Ten Eyck.
- Maeriae Bleecker (1683–1690), who died young.
- Hendrick Bleecker (1686–1767)
- Rachael Bleecker (1688–1766)
- Maria Bleecker (1692–1693), who died young.

Bleecker died in Albany on November 21, 1732. He was originally buried at Albany's First Reformed Church, and was later reinterred at Albany Rural Cemetery.

=== Descendants ===
Through his daughter Margarita, he was the grandfather of Tobias Coenraedt Ten Eyck (1717–1785), married Rachel de Peyster (1728–1794), daughter of Johannes de Peyster III and granddaughter of Myndert Schuyler and Johannes de Peyster Jr.

Other members of the Bleecker family to serve as Mayor include Charles Edward Bleecker (1826–1873) and Anthony Bleecker Banks (1835–1910).

In addition, Harmanus Bleecker (1779–1849), another descendant, served in the United States House of Representatives and as Chargé d'Affaires in the Netherlands.

Political offices
Preceded by Pieter Van Brugh	Mayor of Albany, New York; 1700–1701	Succeeded by Johannes Bleecker, Jr.
