= Anthony Bleecker =

American writer

Coordinates: 40.70929°N 73.90704°W

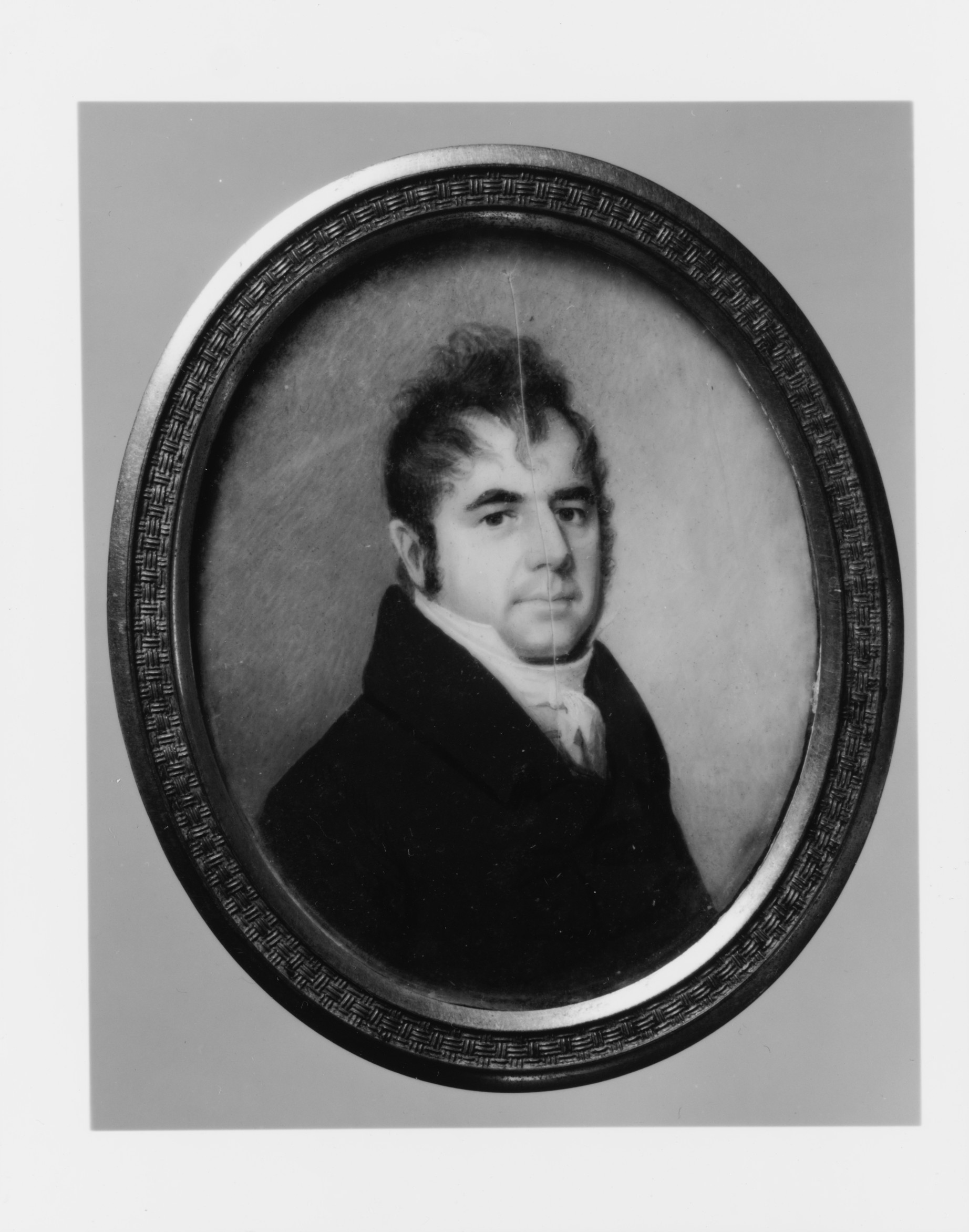
- Anthony Bleecker c. 1810
- Born: October 1770; New York City, New York, British America
- Died: March 13, 1827 (aged 56); New York City, New York, United States
- Occupations: Lawyer, author
- Parent: Anthony Lispenard Bleecker

Signature
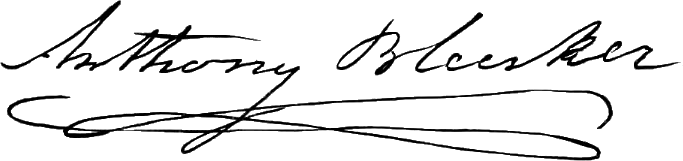

Anthony Bleecker (October 1770 – March 13, 1827) was a lawyer and author who was a friend of Washington Irving and William Cullen Bryant.

== Biography ==
He was born in New York City, the son of Anthony Lispenard Bleecker, one of the wealthiest and most influential citizens in 18th century New York, and for whom Bleecker Street in Greenwich Village was named.

Bleecker graduated from Columbia University (1791) and studied law, but was reputedly never a successful practitioner principally due to his oratory skills, of which he was ever self-conscious. For some thirty years he was a contributor of prose and verse to periodicals published in New York City and Philadelphia. The poet William Cullen Bryant wrote:

Anthony Bleecker, who read everything that came out, and sometimes wrote for the magazines, was an amusing companion, always ready with his puns, of whom Miss Eliza Fenno, before her marriage to Verplanck in 1811, wrote that she had gone into the country to take refuge from Anthony Bleecker's puns.

Bleecker was one of the founders of the New York Historical Society and a member of its first standing committee. The Society was extremely influential in the expansion of historical knowledge across the United States. For many years he was Examiner-in-Chancery and served as secretary of the New York City Dispensary. He was also a trustee of the New York Society Library and secretary of its board of trustees from 1816 until 1827.

He died at the home of his brother-in-law, John Neilson, M.D., New York City, New York.

== Literary works ==
His poems and other articles were appearing occasionally, scattered through various literary journals, from 1800 to 1825. Some of them appeared in Samuel Kettell's collection, Specimens of American Poetry, namely the poems "On Revisiting the Cottage of Rosa in Early Spring, after a Long Absence" "Trenton Falls, near Utica" "Jungfrau Spaiger’s Apostrophe to Her Cat." The only longer work that lists him, albeit as an editor, is captain James Riley's narrative, The Narrative of the Brig Commerce. The book is an autobiographical account that starts with a brief sketch of Riley's life followed by the events after his brig Commerce was shipwrecked in 1815 off the west African coast. It describes the sufferings of the surviving officers and crew as they were enslaved by the wandering Arabs on the Sahara desert. It contains interesting descriptions of empire of Morocco, Timbuctoo on the river Niger, and Mogadore.

== Family ==
His nephew Richard Wade Bleecker (born in New York City, August 27, 1821; died there, April 21, 1875) engaged in business in New York City, and for some time was president of the North American Fire Insurance Company. He was an active patron of the arts and sciences, and the literary receptions held at his residence were attended by prominent artists and authors. He was a member of the New York Historical Society, a fellow of the National Academy of Design, a member of the American Institute, and also of other art and historical societies both at home and abroad.
