= Leonard Lispenard =

American politician

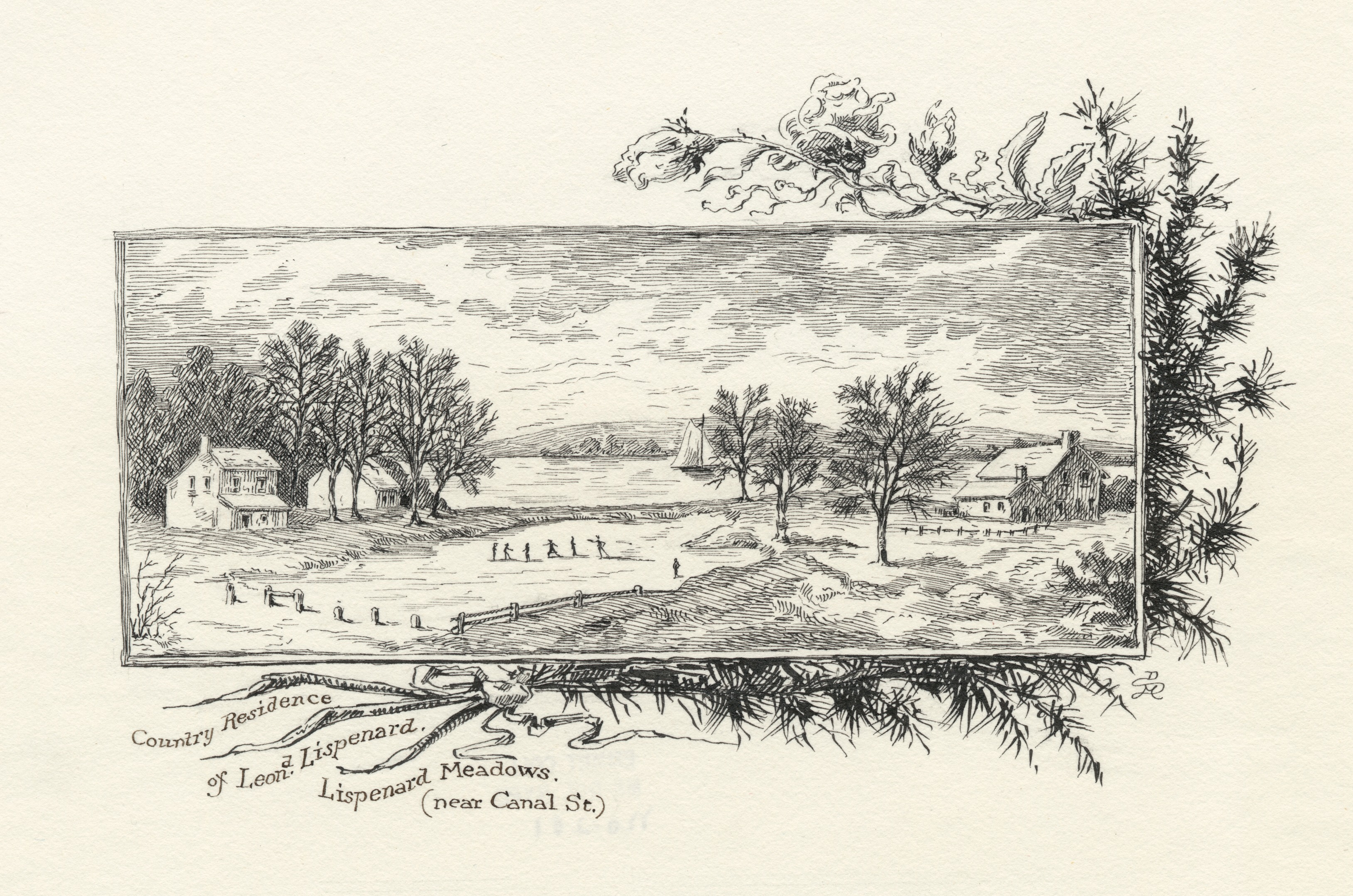
Country residence of Leon. Lispenard, Lispenard Meadows

Col. Leonard Lispenard (December 14, 1714 – February 20, 1790) was a New York City merchant, politician and landowner.

== Early life ==
Lispenard was born on December 14, 1714, in the City of New York. He was the eldest son of six children born to Anthony Lispenard (1683–1758) and Elizabeth Huygens De Kleyn (b. 1688). He was the grandson of Antoine L'Espinard (1643–1696) and Abeltje. His sister, Abigail Lispenard (1718–1807) was married to Jacobus Rutger Bleecker (b. 1716), and was the mother of Anthony Lispenard Bleecker (1741–1816) the prominent banker and merchant.

== Career ==
From 1750 to 1755, he was assistant alderman of the North Ward of New York, followed by alderman of the same ward from 1756 until 1762. From 1759 until 1768, he served in the provincial New York General Assembly, He served as one of the first governors of the Society of the New York Hospital from 1770 to 1777.

In 1765, he was a delegate to the Stamp Act Congress. He was a member of New York City's revolutionary committees that seized control of the city after the American Revolutionary War broke out, and he led a small contingent of militia that seized a British supply ship in the harbor.

He entertained George Washington when he was en route toward Boston to take command of the Continental Army in June 1775.

== Personal life ==
Lispenard was married to Elsie Rutgers (b. 1720), the daughter of Anthony Rutgers (1672–1746). Together, they were the parents of three children:

- Cornelia Lispenard (1740–1775), who married Thomas Marston (1739–1814) on February 5, 1759.
- Anthony Lispenard (1742–1806), who married Sarah Barclay, daughter of Andrew Barclay and Helena (née Roosevelt) Barclay (1719–1772) (granddaughter of Nicholas Roosevelt), on December 10, 1764. They had three sons and three daughters, including:
  - Sarah Lispenard, who married in 1804 Ulster-born New York merchant and broker Alexander L. Stewart (1775–1838), nephew of Continental Congressman Lt.-Col. Charles Stewart (grandparents of Sen. Lispenard Stewart Jr. and great-grandparents of Princess Anita de Braganza).
- Leonard Lispenard Jr. (1743–1790), a graduate of Kings's College who was a merchant, member of chamber of commerce and owned property at Davenport's Neck where he had a summer house, who died unmarried.

After the death of his father-in-law, Anthony Rutgers, he was the owner of his estate, thereafter known as "Lispenard Meadow." Lispenard died on February 20, 1790.
