= Bleecker Street =

Street in Manhattan, New York

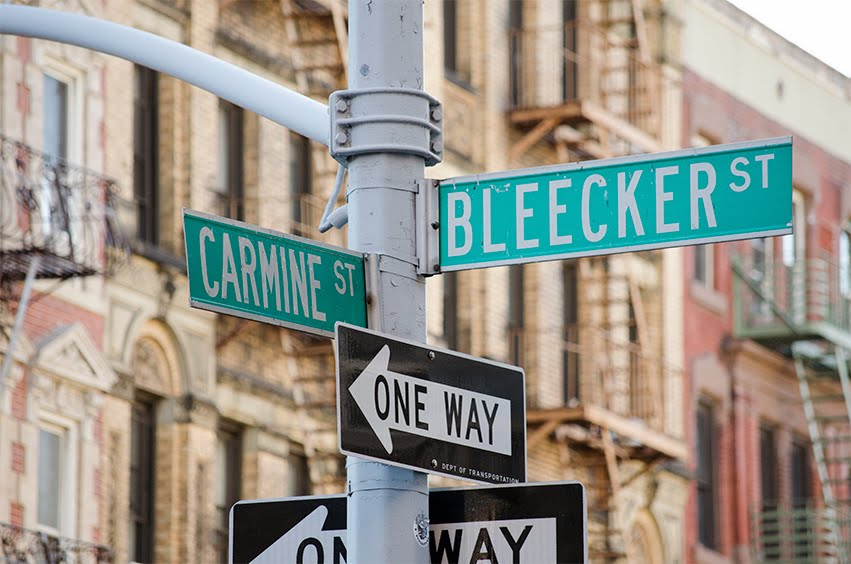
The corner of Carmine and Bleecker streets in Lower Manhattan

Bleecker Street is an east–west street in Lower Manhattan, New York City. It is most famous today as a Greenwich Village nightclub district. The street connects a neighborhood popular today for music venues and comedy as well as an important center of LGBT history and culture and bohemian tradition. The street is named after the family name of Anthony Lispenard Bleecker, a banker, the father of Anthony Bleecker, a 19th-century writer, through whose family farm the street once ran.

Bleecker Street connects Abingdon Square (the intersection of Eighth Avenue and Hudson Street) in the West Village, to the Bowery in the East Village and NoHo.

== History ==
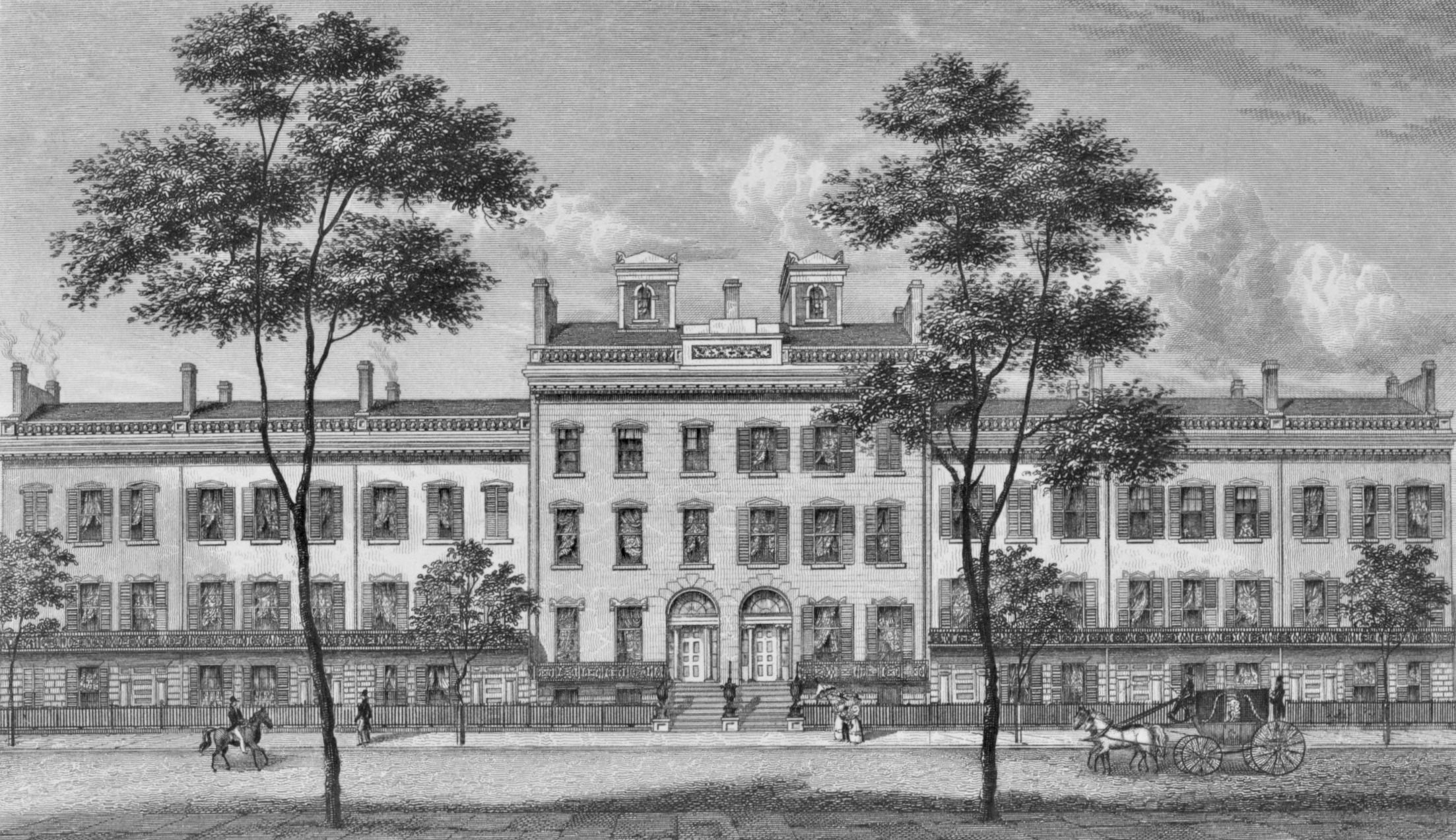
LeRoy Place, south side of Bleecker Street, drawn in 1831. After 1852, the economic status of the area declined, and these aristocratic buildings were all demolished by 1875.

Bleecker Street was named after the Bleecker family because the street ran through the family's farm. In 1808, Anthony Lispenard Bleecker and his wife deeded to the city a major portion of the land on which Bleecker Street sits.

Originally, Bleecker Street extended from Bowery to Broadway, along the north side of the Bleecker farm, later as far west as Sixth Avenue. In 1829, it was joined with Herring Street, extending Bleecker Street north-northwest to Abingdon Square.

=== LeRoy Place ===
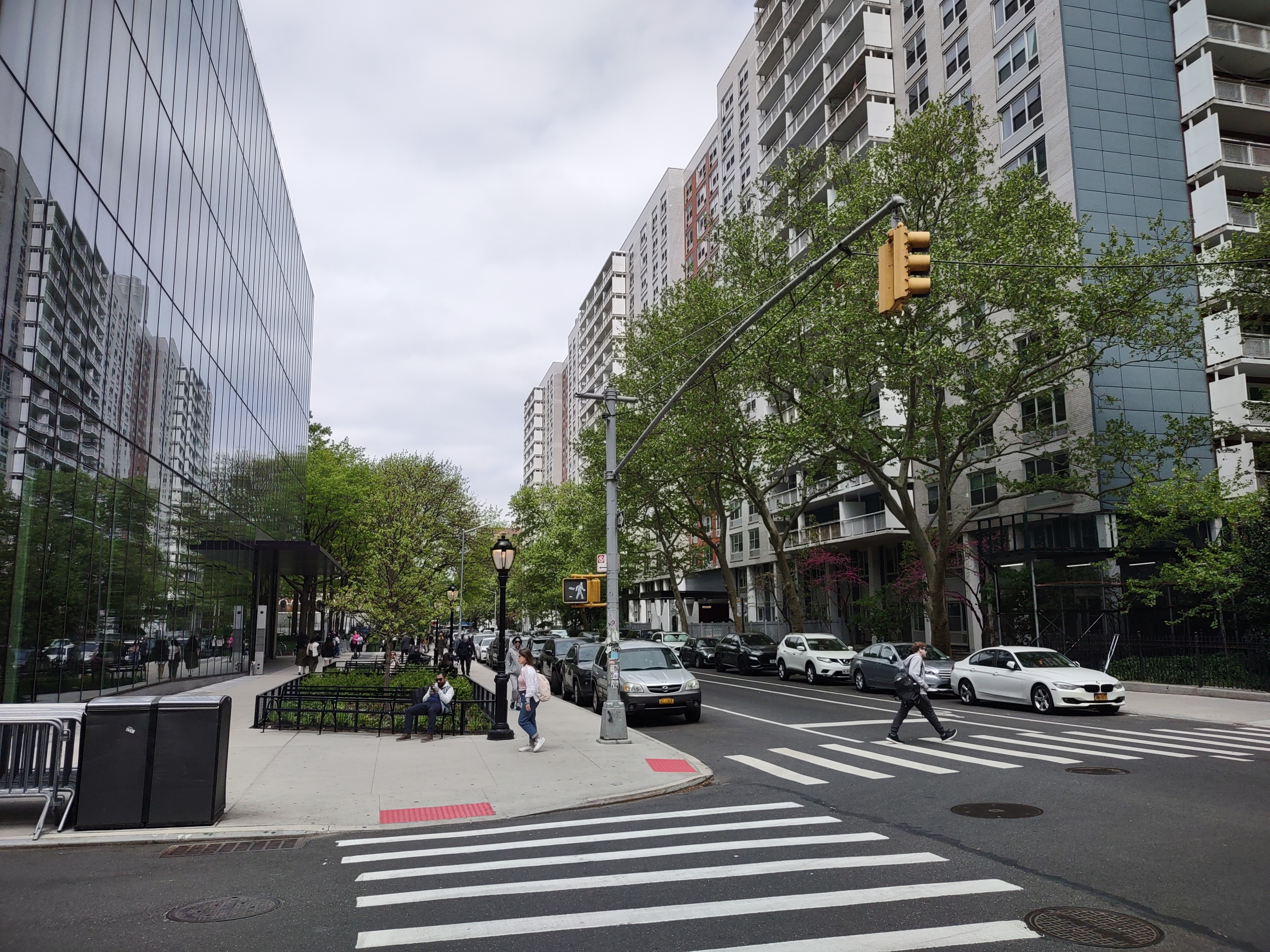
LeRoy Place in 2024

LeRoy Place is the former name of a block of Bleecker Street between Mercer and Greene Streets. This was where the first palatial "winged residences" were built. The effect was accomplished by making the central houses taller and closer to the street, while the other houses on the side were set back. The central buildings also had bigger, raised entrances and lantern-like roof projections. The houses were built by Isaac A. Pearson on both sides of Bleecker Street. To set his project apart from the rest of the area, Pearson convinced the city to rename this block of the street after the prominent international trader Jacob LeRoy.

== Transportation ==
Bleecker Street is served by the 4, 6, <6>, B, D, F, <F>, and M trains at Bleecker Street/Broadway–Lafayette Street station. The 1 and 2 trains serve the Christopher Street–Sheridan Square station one block north of Bleecker Street.

No bus route runs on Bleecker Street. The following routes intersect with it:

- M20 at Hudson Street/8th Avenue uptown and 7th Avenue South downtown.
- M8 at West 10th Street eastbound and Christopher Street westbound.
- M55 at 6th Avenue uptown and Broadway downtown.
- Full-route M1 trips at Lafayette Street uptown and Broadway downtown.
- M103 at Bowery.

Traffic on the street is one-way, going southeast. In early December 2007, a bicycle lane was marked on the street.

== Notable places ==
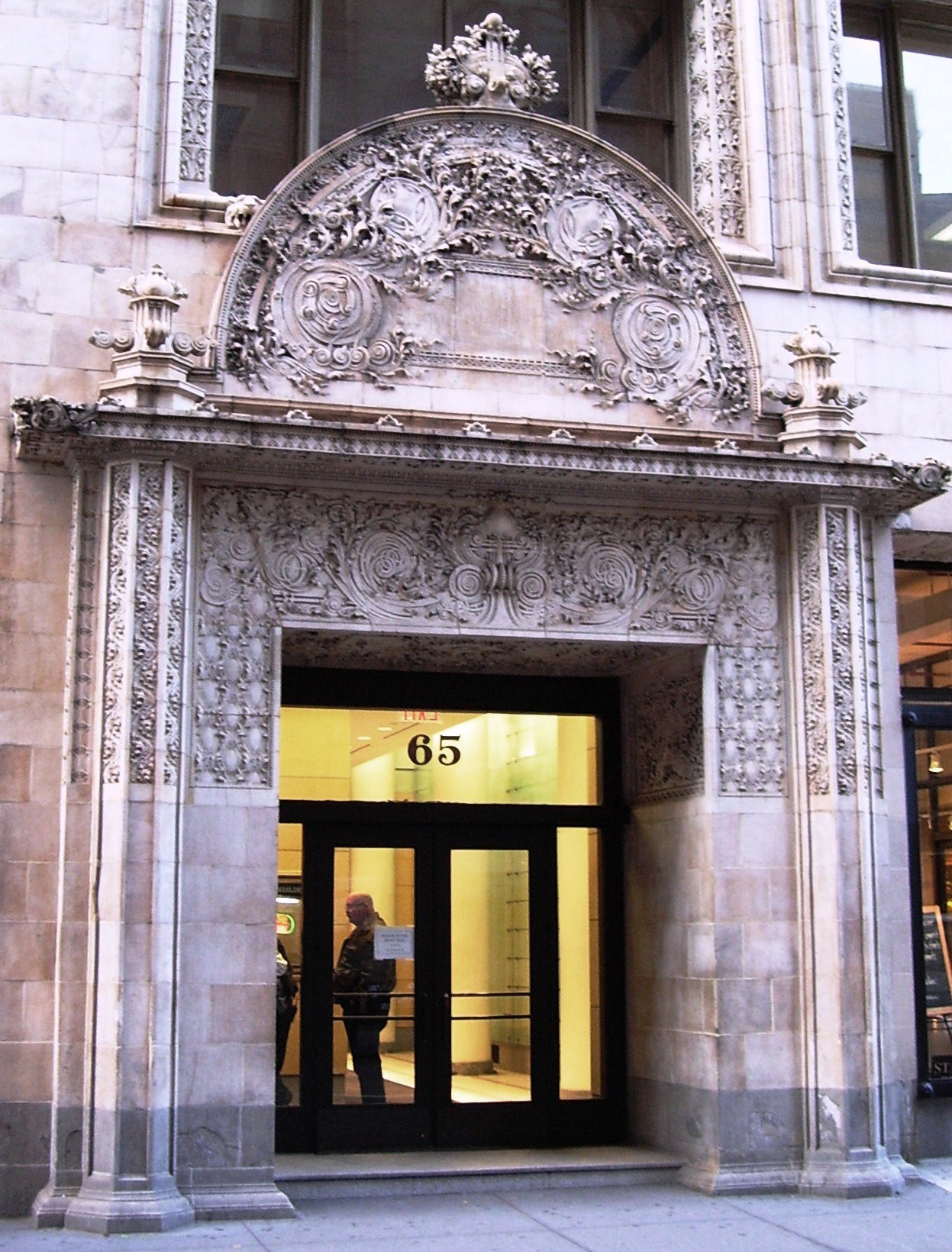
The Bayard–Condict Building at 65 Bleecker Street

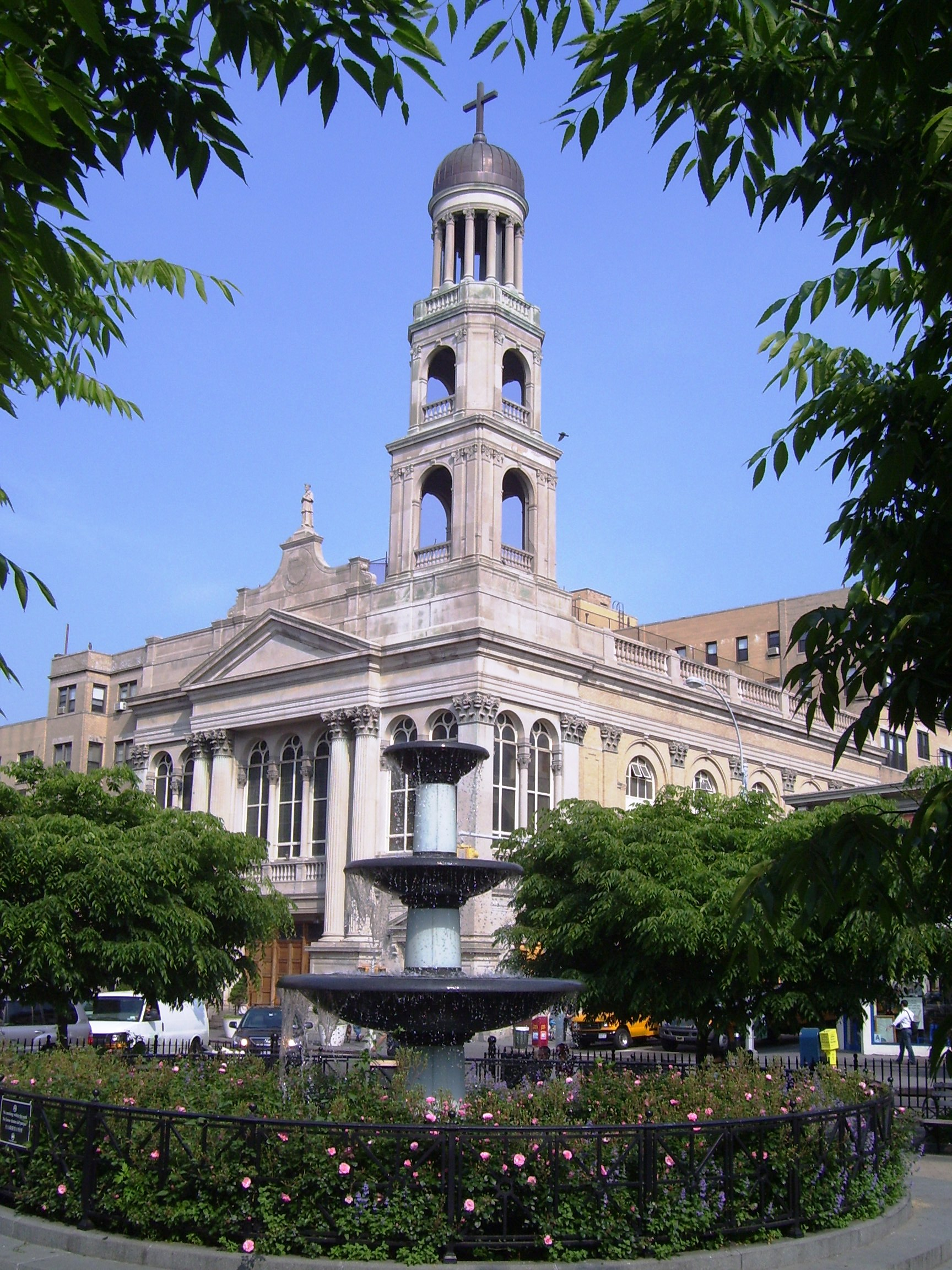
Our Lady of Pompeii Church

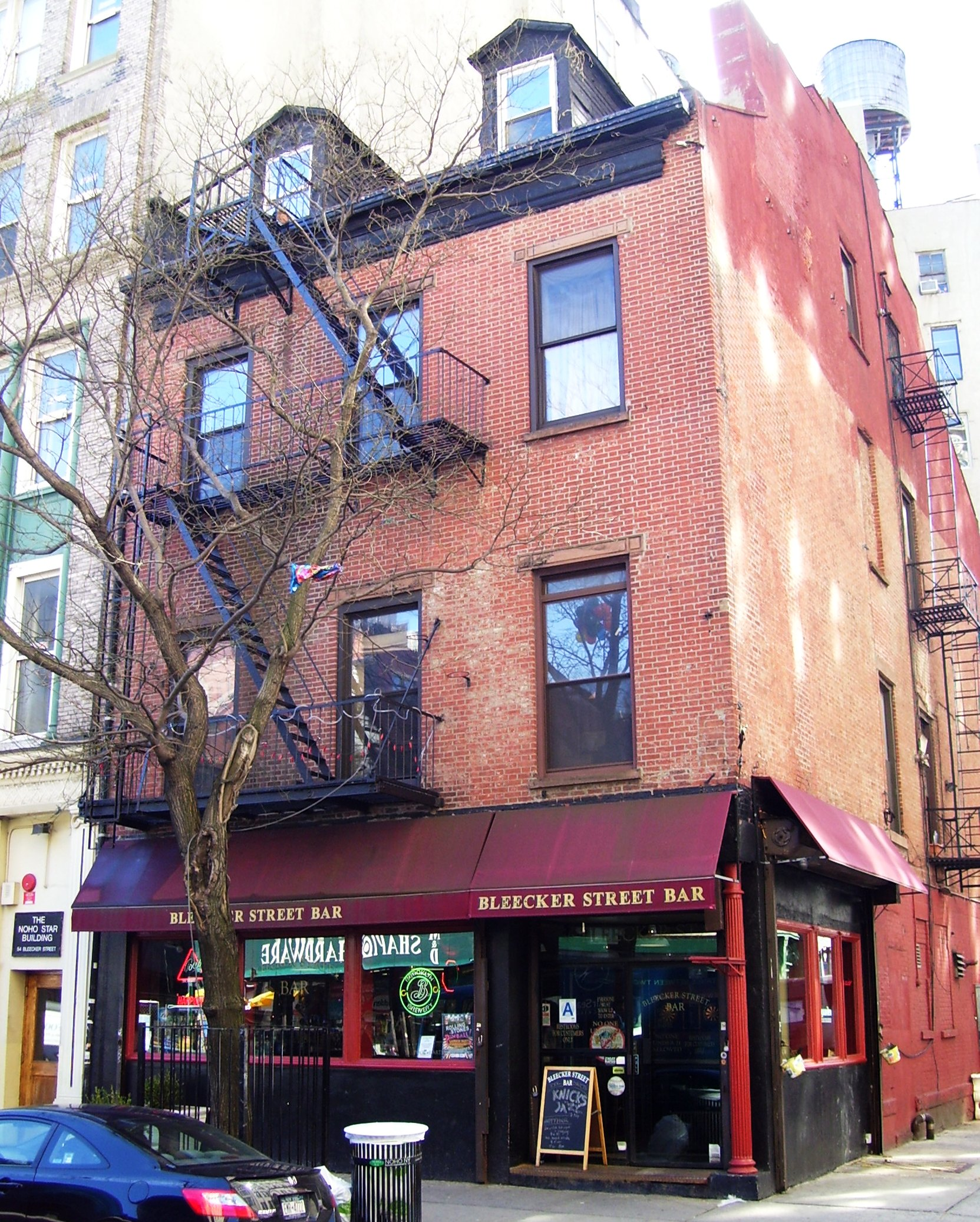
The James Roosevelt House at 58 Bleecker Street

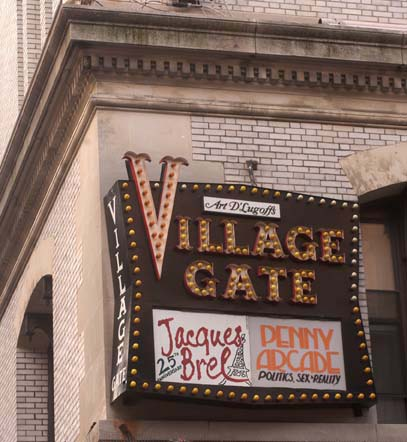
The Village Gate at Thompson and Bleecker Streets

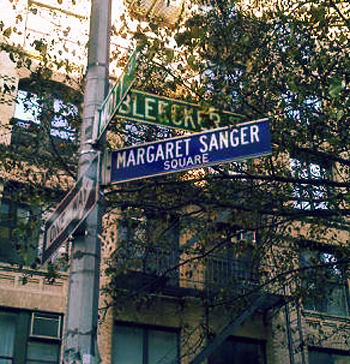
Margaret Sanger Square, at the intersection of Mott Street and Bleecker Street in Manhattan

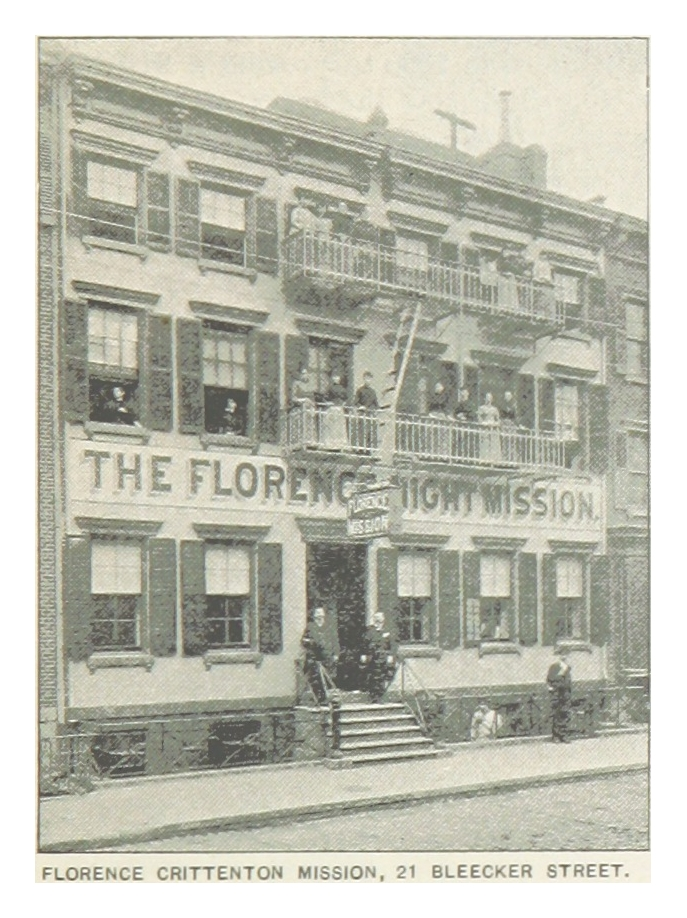
Florence Crittenton Mission, 21 Bleecker Street, 1893

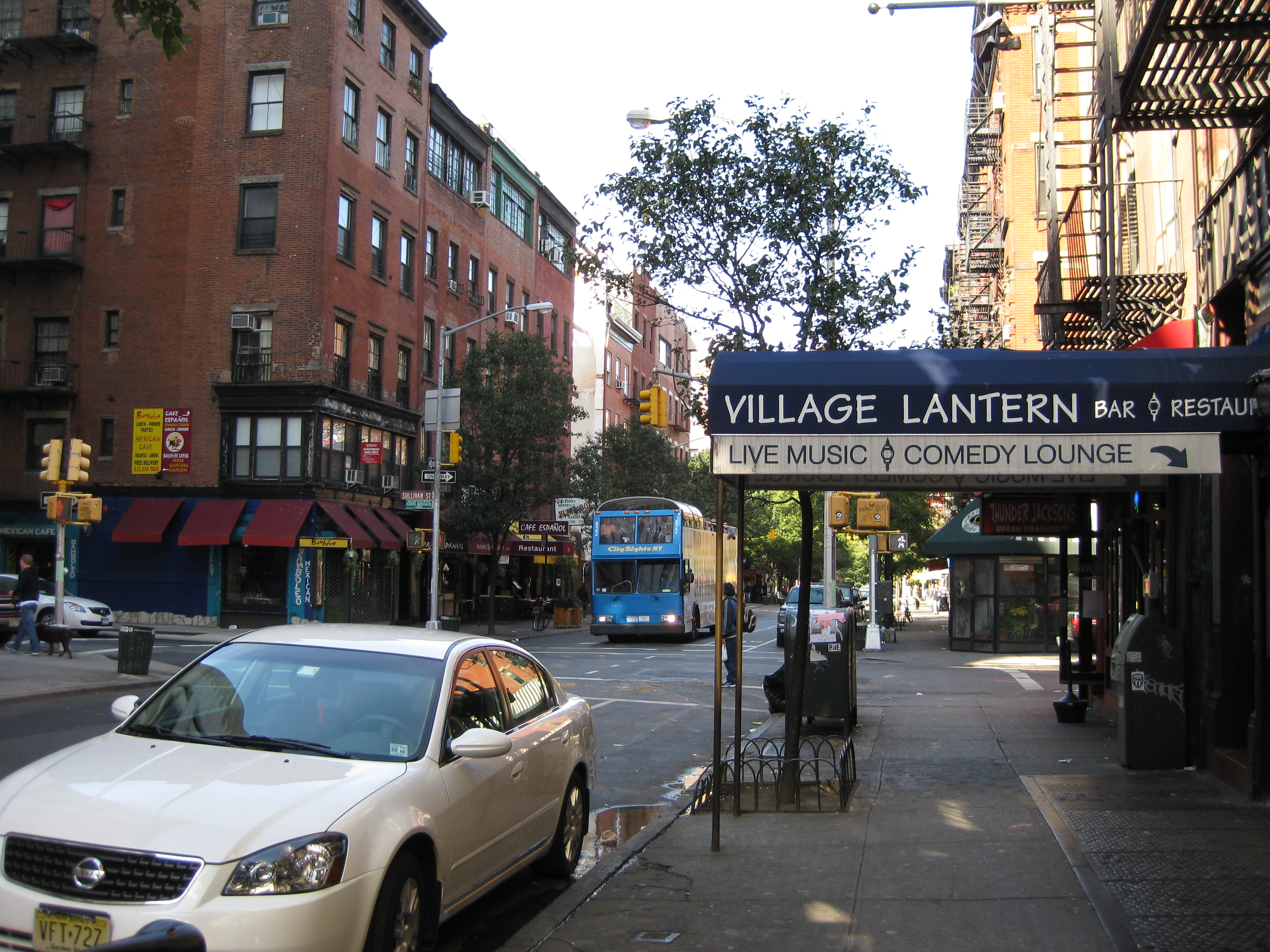
Bleecker Street near the corner of Sullivan Street

=== Landmarks ===
- Bayard–Condict Building
- Bleecker Sitting Area contains a sculpture by Chaim Gross and won a Village Award.
- Bleecker Street Cinema, closed in 1991
- Lynn Redgrave Theater, formerly known as Bleecker Street Theater
- The Little Red Schoolhouse, one of the nation's first progressive schools, on the corner of 6th Avenue and Bleecker Street
- Our Lady of Pompeii Church, Carmine Street
- Mills House No. 1 at 160 Bleecker Street was planned to be designated as an official landmark by the New York City Landmarks Preservation Commission in 1967, but the owner's lawyer objected.
- The Silver Towers at 100 Bleecker Street are home to New York University faculty housing.

In addition, there are several Federal architecture-style row houses at 7 to 13 and 21 to 25 Bleecker Street on easternmost block of Bleecker Street, in NoHo between Lafayette Street and the Bowery. 21 and 29 Bleecker Street were also once the home of the National Florence Crittenton Mission, providing a home for "fallen women". 21 Bleecker Street's entrance now bears the lettering "Florence Night Mission", described by The New York Times in 1883 as "a row of houses of the lowest character". The National Florence Crittenton Mission was an organization established in 1883 by Charles N. Crittenton. It attempted to reform prostitutes and unwed pregnant women through the creation of establishments where they were to live and learn skills.

The building at 58 Bleecker Street (formerly 64 Bleecker Street) was built in 1823 for James Roosevelt, great-grandfather of President Franklin Delano Roosevelt. It was there that Elizabeth Blackwell, America's first female physician, established a clinic with her sister Emily.

Across the street from the former home of the National Florence Crittenton Mission is both the headquarters of Planned Parenthood and the Catholic Sheen Center, immediately adjacent to it. Bleecker Street now features the Margaret Sanger Square, at the intersection with Mott Street. Bleecker Street was the original home of Sanger's Birth Control Clinical Research Bureau, which operated in another building from 1930 to 1973. The street features in the 2020 drama film Never Rarely Sometimes Always, written and directed by Eliza Hittman.

=== Night spots ===
- The Bitter End at 147 Bleecker Street
- Cafe Au Go Go was in the basement of the New Andy Warhol Garrick Theatre (in the 1960s) at 152 Bleecker Street
- (Le) Poisson Rouge at 158 Bleecker Street
- The Village Gate was at 160 Bleecker Street

=== Restaurants ===
- John's of Bleecker Street, famous pizzeria established in 1929
- Kesté, highly rated Neapolitan-style pizzeria established in 2009
- Quartino Bottega Organica, or "Quartino" for short, at 11 Bleecker Street, closed in 2021 to be converted into a single-family home. It was one of the favorite restaurants of David Bowie, who lived on Mulberry Street.

=== Former ===
- The CBGB club, which closed in 2006, was located at the east end of Bleecker Street, on Bowery
- Bleecker Bob's record shop started at 149 Bleecker street
- Overthrow, a boxing club, was located at 9 Bleecker Street, but closed in November 2024. Its location is notable for being the former home of the Youth International Party (Yippie).

== Notable residents ==
- James Agee lived at 172 Bleecker Street, above Cafe Espanol (1941–1951)
- John Belushi lived at 376 Bleecker Street (1975)
- Mykel Board
- Peter Cunningham (photographer) and artist Ara Fitzgerald at 21 Bleecker Street
- Robert De Niro grew up on Bleecker Street
- Photographer Robert Frank and artist June Leaf at 7 Bleecker Street
- Glen Hansard lived at 21 Bleecker Street
- Mariska Hargitay
- Lorraine Hansberry (1953–1960)
- Alicia Keys
- Dua Lipa at 21 Bleecker Street (2019–2020)
- Herman Melville lived at 33 Bleecker Street as a boy.
- Cookie Mueller lived at 285 Bleecker Street, above Ottomanelli's (1976–1989)
- Thomas Paine (1737–1809) lived at 293 Bleecker briefly in 1808–1809 (Conway, Life of Thomas Paine, vol. 2, p. 408
- Jeweler and Sculptor Jill Platner lives and works at 58 Bleecker
- Craig Rodwell lived at 350 Bleecker Street (1968–1993), from which he organized New York's first gay pride parade.
- James Roosevelt (1760–1847) at 58 Bleecker Street
- Edward Thebaud
- Gasper Noe
- Mark Van Doren
- Jean-Claude van Itallie lived at 21 Bleecker Street
- Gernot Wagner
- Dave Winer
- Peter Winston, chess player

== In popular culture ==
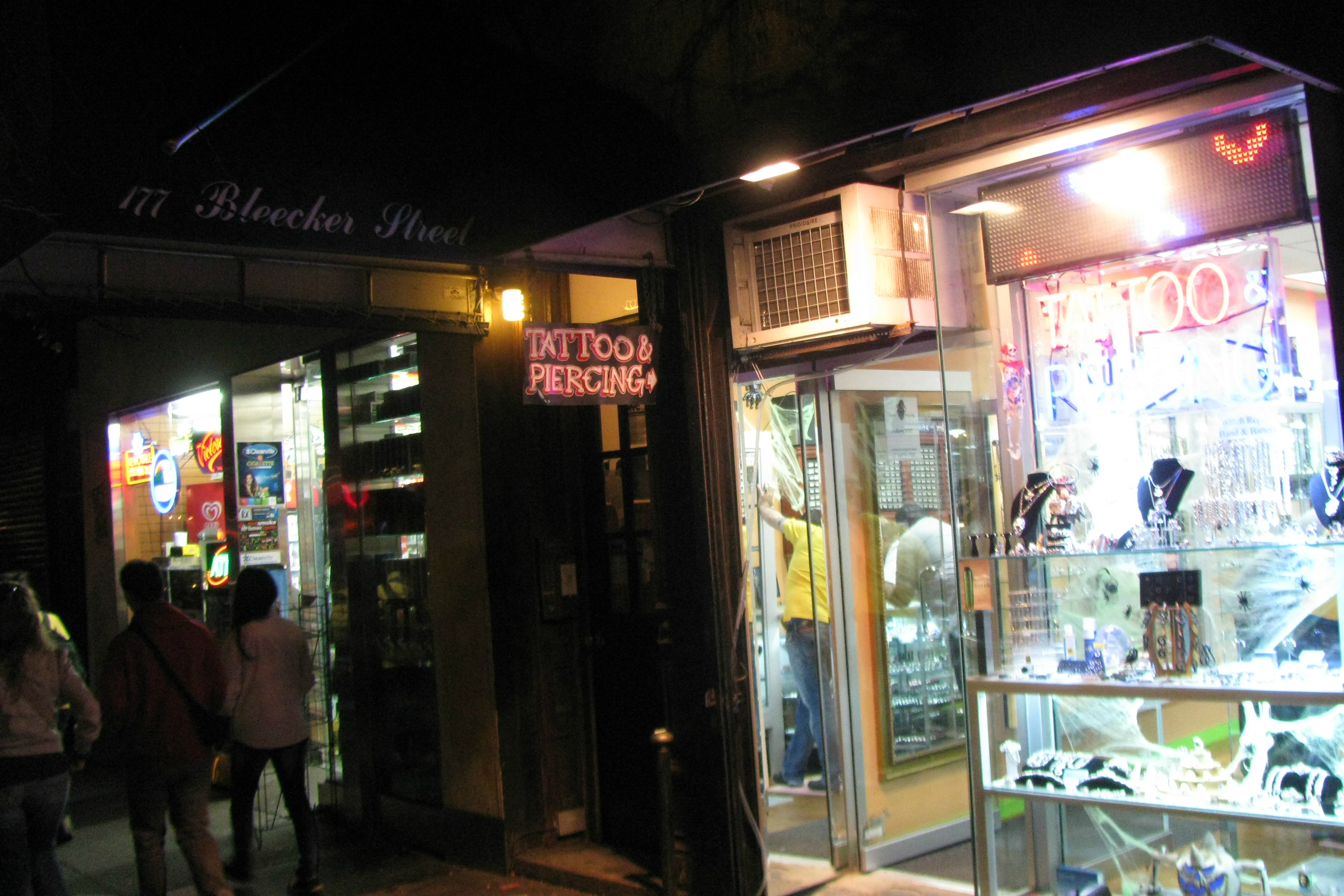
177 Bleecker Street. In Marvel Comics, 177A Bleecker Street is the location of Doctor Strange's Sanctum Sanctorum.

=== Literature ===
- Valenti Angelo's 1949 novel The Bells of Bleecker Street is set in the Italian American community in that neighborhood.
- Nobel laureate Derek Walcott wrote a poem about Bleecker Street entitled "Bleecker Street, Summer".
- In Marvel Comics, 177A Bleecker Street is the location of Doctor Strange's Sanctum Sanctorum.
- "The Repairer of Reputations"—the first short story in Robert W. Chambers 1895 collection The King in Yellow—includes a storyline featuring an armourer on Bleecker Street.

=== Film and television ===
- The Kate & Allie television show from the 1980s depicted two single mothers living on Bleecker in a basement apartment.
- In the original Teenage Mutant Ninja Turtles movie from 1990, the corner of 11th and Bleecker is where April O'Neil lives and runs her father's old antique store known as The Second Time Around.
- Much of the film No Reservations (2007), starring Catherine Zeta-Jones and Aaron Eckhart, is set in a restaurant on the corner of Bleecker and Charles Streets. The name of their fictitious restaurant is 22 Bleecker.
- In The WB series What I Like About You, Holly and Valerie live in an apartment on Bleecker Street.
- The Matthews family in Girl Meets World lives near Bleecker Street and frequents the Bleecker subway station.
- New Andy Warhol Garrick Theatre (in the 1960s) at 152 Bleecker Street.
- Akin to the comics, the New York Sanctum is located on 177A Bleecker Street in the Marvel Cinematic Universe (MCU). It appeared in the films Doctor Strange (2016), Thor: Ragnarok (2017), Avengers: Infinity War (2018), Avengers: Endgame (2019), Spider-Man: No Way Home (2021), and Doctor Strange in the Multiverse of Madness (2022); as well as the Disney+ series Loki (2021).
- In the 2002 film Gangs of New York, there is a scene where a man mentions Bleecker Street whilst singing the sea shanty New York Girls.
- Bleecker Street, a film distribution company, is named after the street.
- The corner of Bleecker and Mott Streets, site of Planned Parenthood features in the 2020 drama film Never Rarely Sometimes Always, written and directed by Eliza Hittman.

=== Music ===
- Gian-Carlo Menotti wrote an opera The Saint of Bleecker Street
- Simon & Garfunkel wrote the song "Bleecker Street", released on their album Wednesday Morning, 3 A.M..
- Japanese pop star Ayumi Hamasaki visited Bleecker Street during recording of her (Miss)understood album. The pictures were later published in Hamasaki's famous "Deji Deji Diary" that is published in each issue of ViVi Magazine.
- Iggy Pop discusses dying on Bleecker Street in his song "Punk Rocker".
- "Growing Old on Bleecker Street" is a song featured on American pop trio AJR's debut album, Living Room.
- "Downtown Bleecker" is a modern instrumental jazz piece for saxophone which appears on the digital EP Midnight Sun, produced by independent artist Simon Edward.
- "Country Boy and Bleecker Street" is a song which appears on the 1967 album H.P. Lovecraft, by the folk-rock band H.P. Lovecraft.
- Fred Neil has mentioned Bleecker Street in multiple works in his career, most notably on two of his album covers.
- Peter Paul and Mary mentioned Bleecker Street in their song "Freight Train" on the album In the Wind
- Joni Mitchell mentioned Bleecker Street in her song "Tin Angel" on her 1969 album Clouds, and later in "Song for Sharon" on the album Hejira.
- Lloyd Cole mentioned Bleecker Street in his song "What Do You Know About Love?" on his 1990 album Lloyd Cole
- Led Zeppelin's Robert Plant sings that he is on the 'corner of Bleecker and nowhere' in the song 'Hots on for Nowhere'
- "77 Bleeker Street" is a song by Jill Jones, written, composed and produced by Prince. It was a b-side to the single "Mia Bocca" from the album Jill Jones.
- Paolo Nutini mentioned Bleecker Street in his song "Better Man" on his 2014 album Caustic Love.
- Marcy Playground's 1997 song "The Vampires of New York" alludes to the more sordid aspects of the street's history.
- Connor Oberst of Bright Eyes mentions Bleecker Street in their 2024 single "Bells and Whistles"
- The New Pornographers mention Bleecker Street (and Broadway) in their song "Myriad Harbour"
- The opening verse of PJ Harvey's 1999 song The Faster I Breathe The Further I Go includes the line "I'm walking on Bleecker, the street of no cheer".

=== Other ===
- A bar named "Bleecker Street Lounge" is open in the Disney Hotel New York – The Art of Marvel at Disneyland Paris since its themed reopening of June 21, 2021.
- There is a character from Dimension 20's The Unsleeping City, The Great Dragon of Bleecker Street, that is named after this street.
