= The Flight Across the Ocean =

Opera

- Lehrstücke by Bertolt Brecht
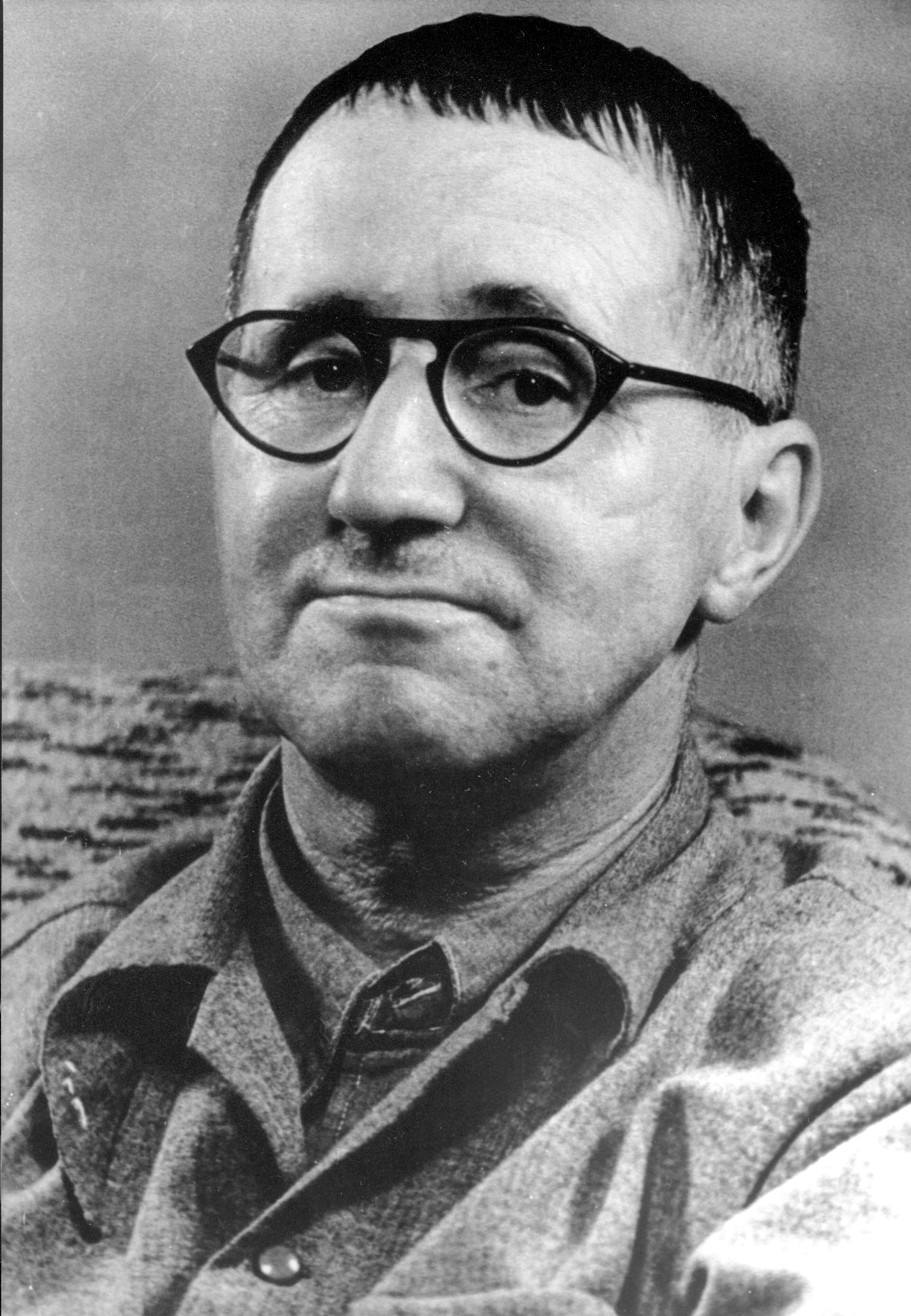
- Native title: Der Ozeanflug
- Language: German
- Based on: "WE" by Charles Lindbergh
- Premiere: 1929

The Flight Across the Ocean (German: Der Ozeanflug) is a Lehrstück by the German dramatist Bertolt Brecht, inspired by We, Charles Lindbergh's 1927 account of his transatlantic flight in the plane Spirit of St. Louis. Written for the Baden-Baden Music Festival, it was originally entitled Lindbergh's Flight (Der Lindberghflug) and premiered in 1929 with music by Kurt Weill and Paul Hindemith in a broadcast by the Frankfurter Rundfunk-Symphonie-Orchester under the direction of Hermann Scherchen and produced by Ernst Hardt.

Shortly afterwards, Weill replaced the Hindemith sections with his own music and this new version (described as a "cantata for soloists, chorus and orchestra") opened at Berlin's Kroll Theatre on 5 December 1929, conducted by Otto Klemperer. The play was enlarged as Der Flug der Lindbergh in 1930, but the new portion was not set to music.

In December 1949, Brecht removed Lindbergh's name from the play for an upcoming production by the Südwestrundfunk. He also added a new preface denouncing Lindbergh's contributions to the technology of terror bombing as well as his wartime isolationism and his widely perceived Nazi sympathies. The original line "Mein Name ist Charles Lindbergh" [My name is Charles Lindbergh] became "Mein Name tut nichts zur Sache" [My name doesn't matter].

== Recording ==
Hindemith, Weill: Der Lindberghflug – Berlin Radio Orchestra and chorus (1930), Cologne Radio Orchestra and Pro Musica Vocal Ensemble (1987)

- Conductor: Hermann Scherchen (1930), Jan Latham-Koenig (1987)
- Principal singers: Ernest Ginsberg (narrator), Erik Wirl (tenor), Fritz Duttbernd (tenor), Gerhard Pechner (voice), Betty Mergler (soprano) (1930), Wolfgang Schmidt, Herbert Feckler, Lorenz Minth, Christoph Scheeben (1987)
- Recording date and location: 18 March 1930 (Berlin) and 1987
- Label: Capriccio – C60012-1 (CD)

== See also ==
- de:Der Flug der Lindberghs, an earlier version (in German)
- The Baden-Baden Lesson on Consent, another Lehrstück
