= Curtiss JN Jenny =

American biplane trainer aircraft (1915–1927)

JN "Jenny"
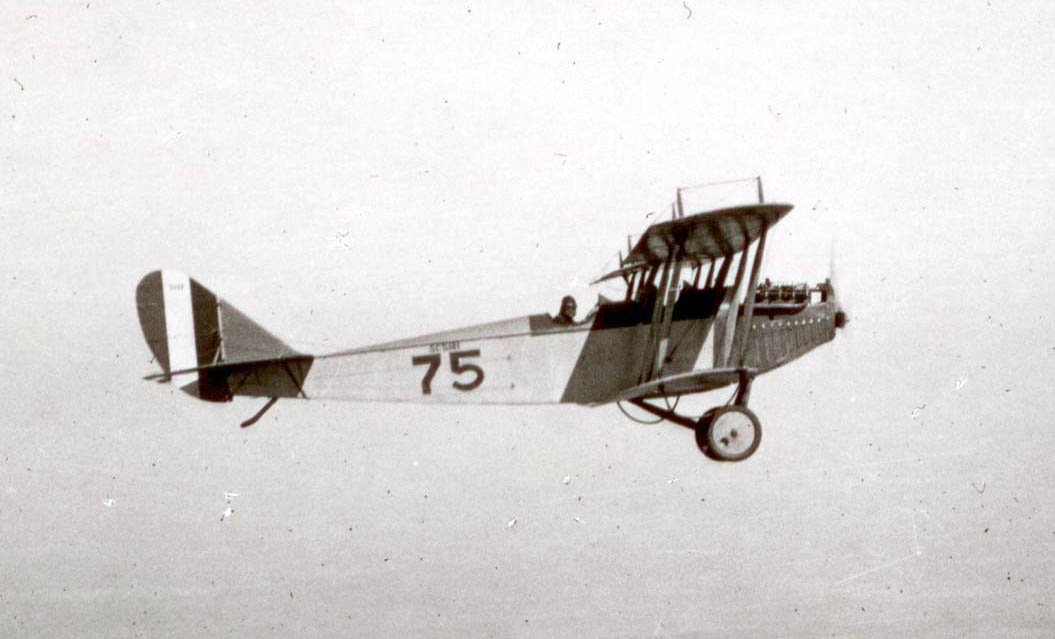
- Curtiss JN-4 Jenny, 1918

General information
- Type: Trainer
- Manufacturer: Curtiss
- Designer: Benjamin D. Thomas
- Primary users: U.S. Army Air Service Royal Flying Corps
- Number built: 6,813

History
- Introduction date: 1915
- Retired: 1927
- Variants: Curtiss N-9; Curtiss JN-6H; Curtiss Twin JN

The Curtiss JN "Jenny" is a series of biplanes built by the Glenn Curtiss Aeroplane Company of Hammondsport, New York, later the Curtiss Aeroplane and Motor Company. Although the Curtiss JN series was originally produced as a training aircraft for the US Army, the "Jenny" (the common nickname derived from "JN") continued after World War I as a civilian aircraft, becoming the "backbone of American postwar [civil] aviation". A version of the plane manufactured in Canada was known as the Curtiss Canuck.

Thousands of surplus Jennys were sold at bargain prices to private owners in the years after the war, and became central to the barnstorming era that helped awaken the United States to civil aviation through much of the 1920s.

== Design and development ==
Curtiss began producing the JN or "Jenny" series of aircraft in 1915. While marketed to the US Army and US Navy as combining the best features of the model J and model N trainers, it was, in fact, a modified model J, with only the upper wing span adjusted. Curtiss built only a limited number of the JN-1 and JN-2 biplanes. The design was commissioned by Glenn Curtiss from Englishman Benjamin Douglas Thomas, formerly of the Sopwith Aviation Company.

The JN-2 was an equal-span biplane with ailerons controlled by a shoulder yoke in the aft cockpit. It was deficient in performance, particularly climbing, because of excessive weight. The improved JN-3 incorporated unequal spans with ailerons only on the upper wings, controlled by a wheel. In addition, a foot bar was added to control the rudder.

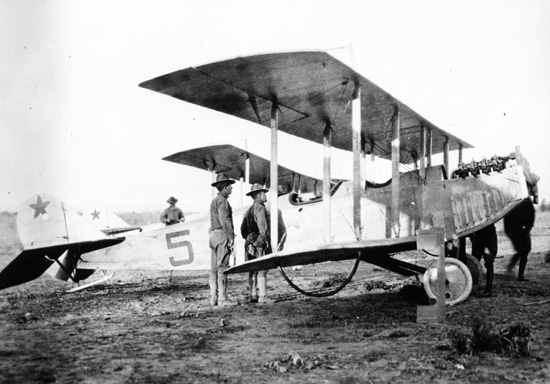
Curtiss JN-3, the progenitor of the JN-4, deployed to Mexico, around 1916

The 1st Aero Squadron of the Aviation Section, US Signal Corps received eight JN-2s at San Diego in July 1915. The squadron was transferred to Fort Sill, Oklahoma, in August to work with the Field Artillery School, during which one JN-2 crashed, resulting in a fatality. The pilots of the squadron met with its commander, Capt. Benjamin Foulois, to advise that the JN-2 was unsafe because of low power, shoddy construction, lack of stability, and overly sensitive rudder. Foulois and his executive officer Capt. Thomas D. Milling disagreed, and flights continued until a second JN-2 crashed in early September, resulting in the grounding of the six remaining JN-2s until mid-October. When two new JN-3s were delivered, the grounded aircraft were then upgraded in accordance with the new design. In March 1916, these eight JN-3s were deployed to Mexico for aerial observation during the Pancho Villa Expedition of 1916–1917.

After the successful deployment of the JN-3, Curtiss produced a development, known as the JN-4, with orders from both the US Army and an order in December 1916 from the Royal Flying Corps for a training aircraft to be based in Canada. (Note: Both the US Army version and the Canadian derivative for the Royal Flying Corps were known as JN-4s. To differentiate between the types, unofficially, the RFC designation was the JN-4 (Canadian).) The Canadian version, the JN-4 (Canadian), also known as the "Canuck", had some differences from the American version, including a lighter airframe, ailerons on both wings, a bigger and more rounded rudder, and differently shaped wings, stabilizer, and elevators.

As many as 12 JN-4 aircraft were fitted with an aftermarket Sikorsky wing by the then-fledgling company in the late 1920s.

== Operational history ==
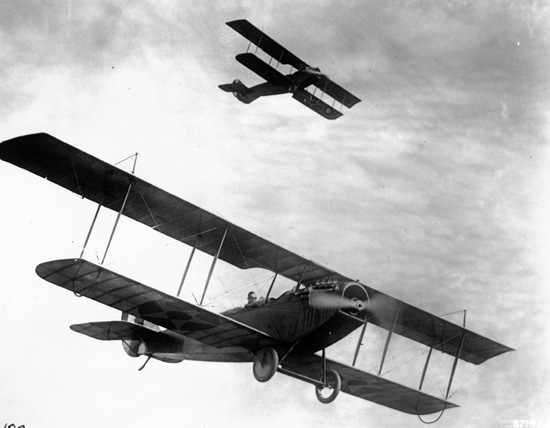
Curtiss JN-4Ds at Camp Taliaferro, Texas, circa 1918

The Curtiss JN-4 is possibly North America's most famous World War I aircraft. It was widely used during World War I to train beginning pilots, with an estimated 95% of all trainees having flown a JN-4. The US version was called "Jenny", a derivation from its official designation. It was a twin-seat (student in front of instructor), dual-control biplane. Its tractor propeller and maneuverability made it ideal for initial pilot training with a 90 hp (67 kW) Curtiss OX-5 V8 engine giving a top speed of 75 mph (121 km/h) and a service ceiling of 6,500 ft (2,000 m). The British used the JN-4 (Canadian), along with the Avro 504, for their primary World War I trainer using the Canadian Aeroplanes Ltd. indigenous variant. Many Royal Flying Corps pilots earned their wings on the JN-4, both in Ontario and later in winter facilities at Camp Taliaferro, Texas.

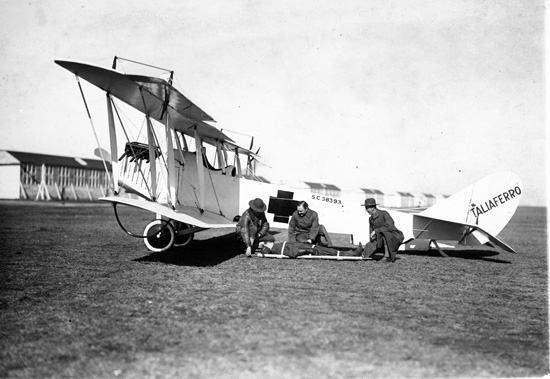
Converted JN-4 ambulance, operated by the Camp Taliaferro medical teams, around 1918

Although ostensibly a training aircraft, the Jenny was extensively modified while in service to undertake additional roles. Due to its robust but easily adapted structure able to be modified with ski undercarriage, the Canadian Jenny was flown year-round, even in inclement weather. The removable turtle deck behind the cockpits allowed for conversion to stretcher or additional supplies and equipment storage, with the modified JN-4s becoming the first aerial ambulances, carrying out this role both during wartime and in later years. Most of the 6,813 Jennys built were unarmed, although some had machine guns and bomb racks for advanced training. With deployment limited to North American bases, none saw combat service in World War I.

The Curtiss factory in Buffalo, New York, was the largest such facility in the world, but due to production demands, from November 1917 to January 1919, six different manufacturers were involved in production of the definitive JN-4D. Production from spare or reconditioned parts continued sporadically until 1927, although most of the final orders were destined for the civilian market in Canada and the United States.

Like the re-engined JN-4H version of the most-produced JN-4 subtype, the final production version of the aircraft was the JN-6, powered by a Wright Aeronautical license-built, 150 hp (112 kW) Hispano-Suiza 8 V-8, first ordered in 1918 for the US Navy. A floatplane version was built for the navy, which was so modified, it was essentially a different airframe. This was designated the N-9. In US Army Air Service usage, the JN-4s and JN-6s were configured to the JNS ("S" for "standardized") model. The Jenny remained in service with the US Army until 1927.

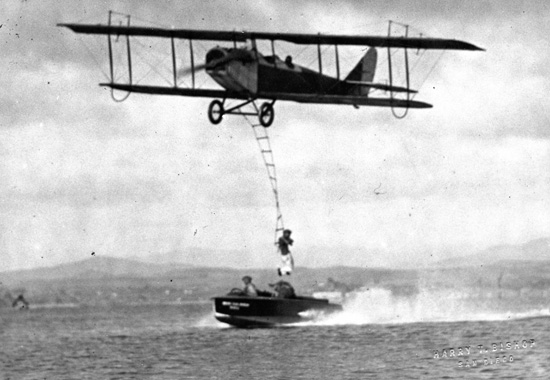
One of the many daredevil stunts performed by JN-4 pilots was to work with a "wingwalker".

After World War I, thousands were sold on the civilian market, including one to Charles Lindbergh in May 1923, in which he then soloed. Surplus US Army aircraft were sold (some still in their unopened packing crates) for as little as $50, flooding the market. (Note: Surplus JN-4s typically fetched between $200 and $500, depending on condition.) With private and commercial flying in North America unhampered by regulations concerning their use, pilots found the Jenny's stability and slow speed made it ideal for stunt flying and aerobatic displays in the barnstorming era between the world wars, with the nearly identical Standard J-1 aircraft often used alongside it. (Note: The front cockpit that was normally for the student in military training was usually used for passengers in postwar joy rides, so the pilot could keep an eye on his paying customer/s.) Some were still flying into the 1930s. (Note: The JN-4 Canuck was often chosen for barnstorming as the lighter, more responsive, and more economical variant was also in large supply.)

JN-4 airframes were used to produce early Weaver Aircraft Company/Advance Aircraft Company/Waco aircraft, such as the Waco 6.

=== Notable firsts ===
Between 1917 and 1919, the JN-4 type accounted for several significant aviation firsts while in service with the US Army Signal Corps Aviation Section and the United States Marine Corps (USMC), including flying the first US Air Mail in May 1918.

In a series of tests conducted at the US Army's Langley Field in Hampton, Virginia, in July and August 1917, the world's first "plane-to-plane" and "ground-to-plane, and vice versa" communications by radiotelephony (as opposed to radiotelegraphy which had been developed earlier) were made to and from modified US Army JN-4s (Note: Quote: "A JN-4-d plane was used; speed was successful, transmitting about 3 miles from plane to plane and was also received from ground to plane, and vice versa.") by Western Electric Company (Bell Labs) design engineers Lewis M. Clement and Raymond Heising, the developers of the experimental wind generator-powered airborne wireless voice transmitter and receiver equipment.

In early 1919, a USMC JN-4 was also credited with what is believed to be the first successful dive-bombing attack during the United States occupation of Haiti. USMC pilot Lt Lawson H. Sanderson mounted a carbine barrel in front of the windshield of his JN-4 (previously, an unarmed trainer that had a machine gun mounted in the rear cockpit) as an improvised bomb sight that was lined up with the long axis of his aircraft, loaded a bomb in a canvas mail bag that was attached to the JN-4's belly, and launched a single-handed raid at treetop level, in support of a USMC unit that had been trapped by Haitian Cacos rebels. Although the JN-4 almost disintegrated in the pullout, the attack was effective and led to Sanderson in 1920 developing further dive-bombing techniques to provide Marine pilots with close aerial support to infantry comrades.

== Variants ==
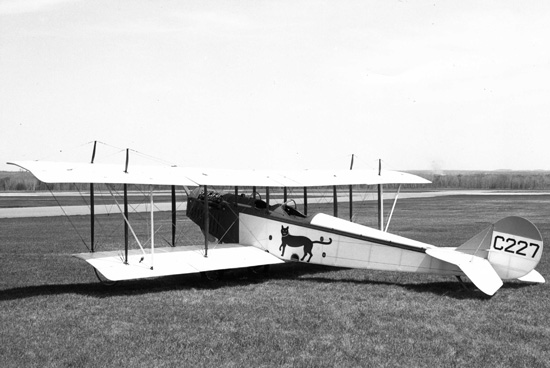
A JN-4 C227 "Canuck" (USAAS #39158) operated by the US Air Army Air Service in 1918, is now restored and on display at the Canada Aviation and Space Museum.

Although the first series of JN-4s was virtually identical to the JN-3, the JN-4 series was based on production orders from 1915 to 1919.

- JN-1 — possibly unofficial designation of the second Model J, which served as the prototype for the Model JN.
  - JN-1W — Two aircraft that appear in US Navy records, which may have been confused with the Models S-4 and S-5.
- JN-2 — first production version, 8 built
- JN-3 — variant with new unequal-span wings and improved flight controls, 97 built for the RNAS (some sources indicate 91, but serial numbers total 97; 12 built in Canada) plus 2 for the US Army. The six surviving JN-2s were modified to this standard.
- JN-4A — production version of the JN-4, 781 built
- JN-4B — This version was powered by an OX-2 piston engine; 76 were built for the US Army, and nine for the US Navy.
- JN-4C — experimental version, only two were built
- JN-4 (Canadian) Canuck — Canadian-built version, 1,260 built by Canadian Aeroplanes Ltd. for the RFC in Canada/RAF in Canada and USAAC: Independently derived from the JN-3, it had a lighter airframe, ailerons on both wings, a bigger and more rounded rudder, and differently shaped wings, stabilizer, and elevators. Its use by the USAAC was curtailed as the lighter structure was claimed to cause more accidents than the US-built aircraft, although no air fatalities were attributed to the structural integrity of the type.
- JN-4D — improved version, adopting the control stick from the JN-4 (Canadian) 2,812 built
  - JN-4D-2 — One prototype only, the engine mount was revised to eliminate the down thrust position.
- JN-4H — two-seat advanced trainer biplane with ailerons on both wings, 929 built for the US Army, notable for introducing the use of the Wright Aeronautical license-built Hispano-Suiza 8 V-8 engine for greater power and reliability
  - JN-4HT — two-seat, dual-control trainer version
  - JN-4HB — bombing trainer version
  - JN-4HG — gunnery trainer version
  - JN-4HM — communications conversion of JN-4HT, powered by Wright-Hisso E 150-hp (112-kW), six converted, used to fly the first US Air Mail (May–August, 1918)
- JN-5H — advanced trainer biplane, only one built
- JN-6 — improved version of JN-5 trainer biplane series, notably used four ailerons, 1,035 built for the US Army and five for the US Navy
- JN-6H — improved version of the JN-6
  - JN-6BH — bomber trainer version
  - JN-6HG-1 — two-seat, dual-control trainer version, 560 built from JN-6 production, 34 for US Navy
  - JN-6HG-2 — single-control gunnery trainer. 90 delivered
  - JN-6HO — single-control observer trainer version, 106 delivered
  - JN-6HP — single-control pursuit fighter trainer version
- JNS ("standardized") — During the postwar years of the early 1920s, between 200 and 300 US Army aircraft were upgraded to a common standard of equipment and modernized.

=== "Specials" ===
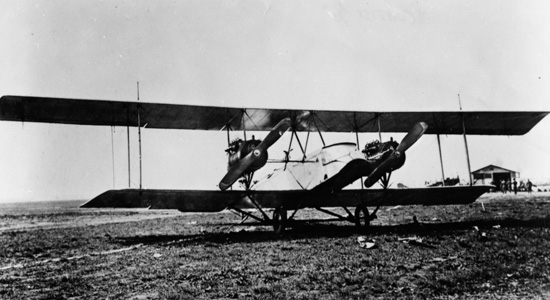
The most radical development of the Curtiss JN-4 was the Twin JN (or "Twin Jenny") in limited production and service with the US military.

- Allison Monoplane — conversion of JN-4 (Can) G-CAJL by the Allison Company, Kansas, that mounted a parasol wing in place of the biplane configuration, only one conversion made
- Curtiss Stinson Special (1918) — a custom-built, single-seat aircraft for Katherine Stinson, constructed from the fuselage of a Curtiss Model S plus new biplane wings and JN-4 tail surfaces, powered by a 100-hp (74.5-kW) OXX-6 (Note: Stinson's aircraft built to her specifications was used for fundraising tours for the American Red Cross. During exhibition flights in Canada, she set a Canadian distance and endurance record, and made the second air mail flight in Canada between Calgary and Edmonton, Alberta. A replica is at the Alberta Aviation Museum.)
- Ericson Special Three — Some reconditioned aircraft built by Canadian Aeroplanes Ltd. were fitted with a third cockpit.
- Hennessey Monoplane — a 1926 monoplane conversion by James R. Hennessey, three-place transport, 90-hp Curtiss OX-5, span: 36 ft (11 m) length: 25 ft (7.6 m)
- Severski 1926 biplane — a JN-4 modified with a roller/ski undercarriage, one experimental aircraft converted by the Seversky company (Note: The name "Severski" was a play on designer Alexander P. de Seversky's name, emphasizing the use of skis.)
- Sperry Monoplane — conversion offered by the Sperry Company that mounted a parasol wing in place of the biplane configuration
- Twin JN — An enlarged twin-engined version of the JN-4, they were powered by two OXX-2 V-8 engines, built in 1916 as the JN-5 for an observation role; among the many other modifications was an enlarged wingspan and new rudder adapted from the Curtiss Model R-4. Two of the series saw action with the US Army on the Mexican border in 1916–1917. A total of eight Twin JNs were built, with two in US Navy service.

== Operators ==
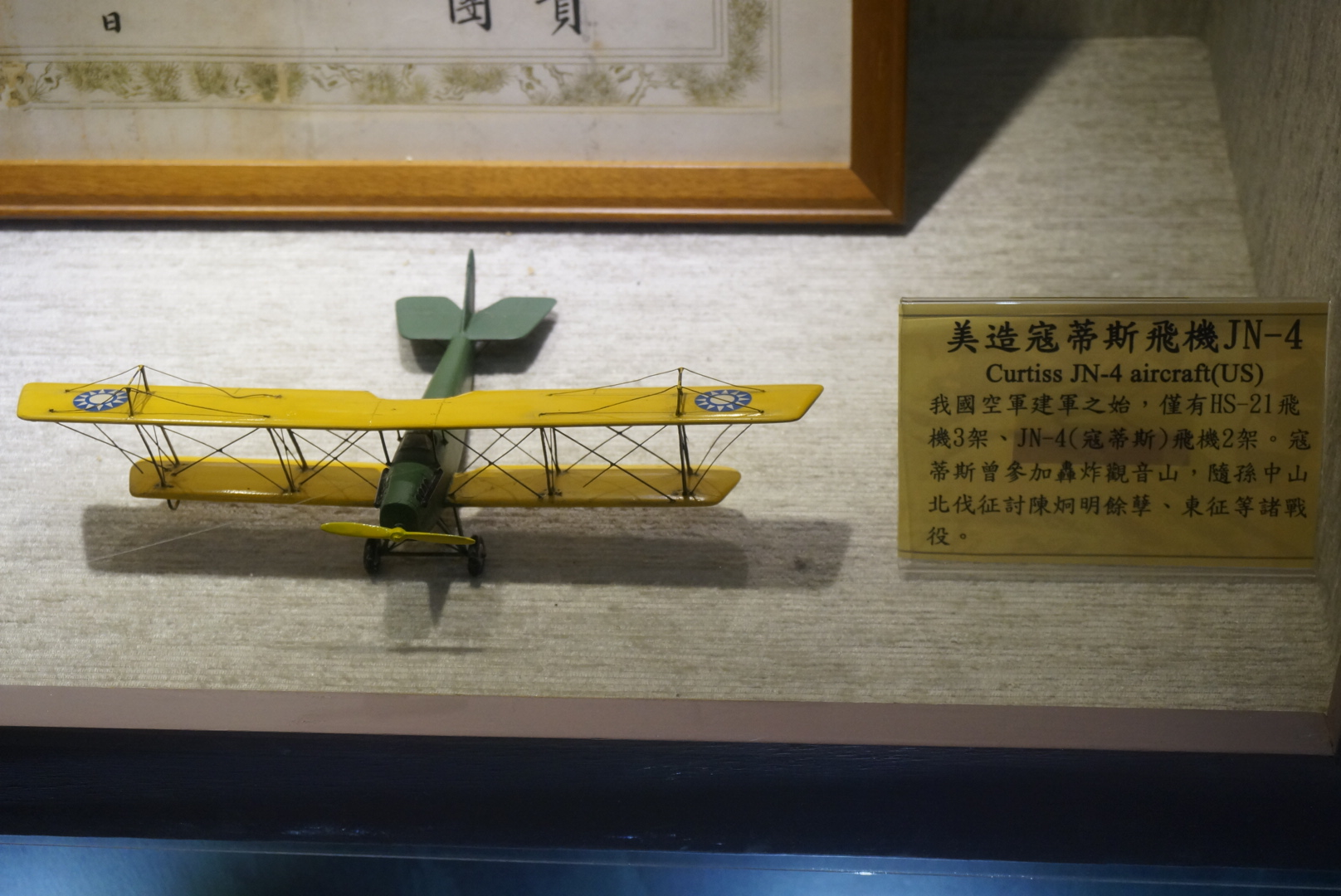
Model of JN-4 used by the Republic of China

=== Military operators ===
Argentina

- Argentine Naval Aviation

Australia

- Australian Flying Corps
  - No. 3 Squadron AFC - Used for training.
  - Central Flying School AFC at Point Cook, Victoria.

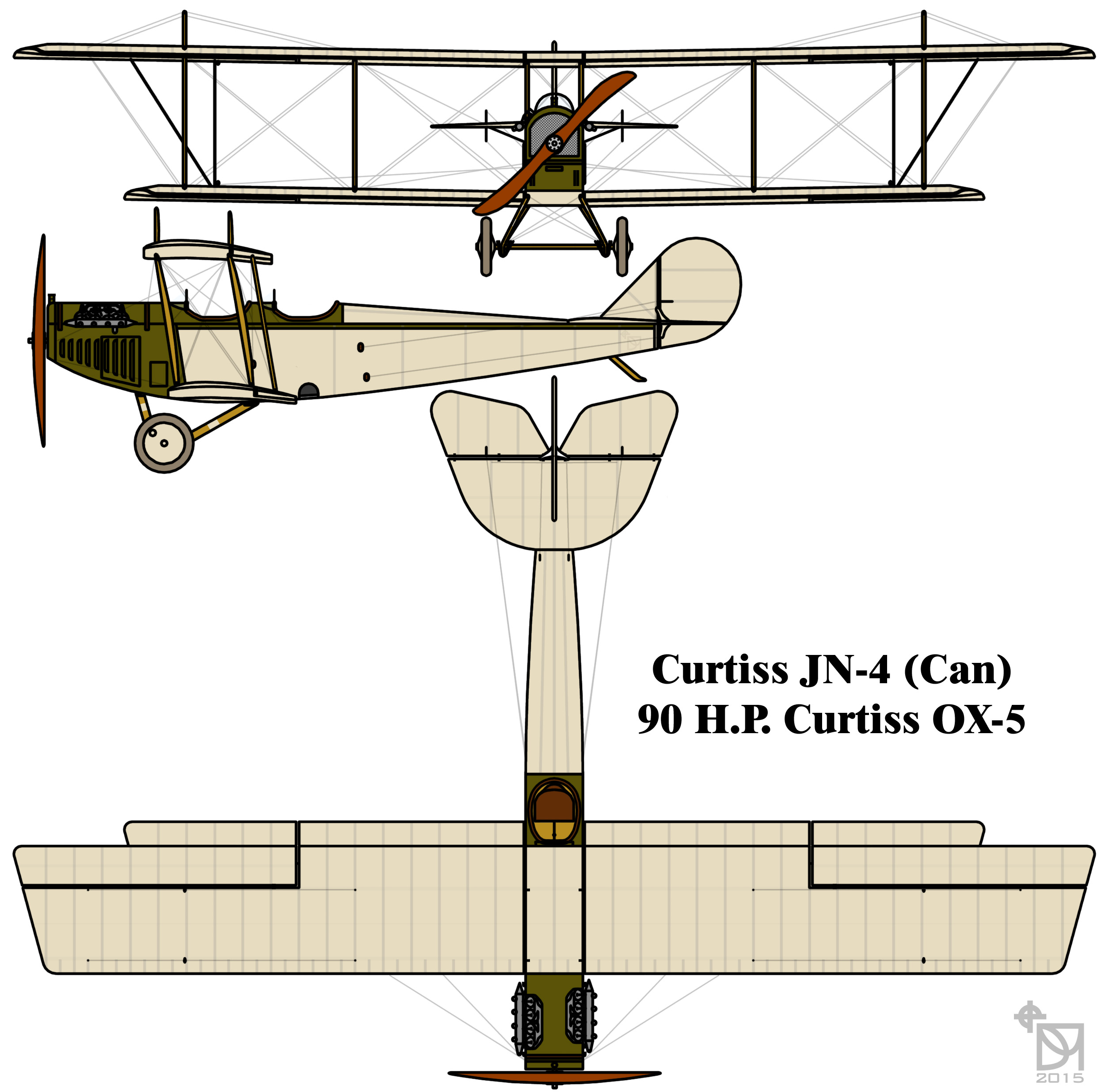
Drawing of the Curtiss JN-4 (Can) or "Canuck"

Brazil

- Brazilian Naval Aviation (JN-4D variant)

Canada

- Royal Flying Corps Canada (primarily JN-4 (Can) variant)
- Royal Canadian Air Force

Cuba

- Cuban Air Force

Nicaragua

- Nicaraguan National Guard (1920)

United Kingdom

- Royal Flying Corps
  - No. 24 Squadron RFC
  - No. 25 Squadron RFC
- Royal Naval Air Service

United States

- United States Army Signal Corps Aviation Section (1915)
- United States Army Signal Corps Aeronautical Division (1915–1918)
- United States Army Air Service (1918 et seq.)
- United States Marine Corps
- United States Navy

(Taiwan) Republic of China

- Nationalist Army Air Wing in the Northern Expedition.

=== Civil operators ===
Canada

- Elliot Air Service, Red Lake, Ontario

Philippine Islands

- Philippine Air Service

== Surviving aircraft ==
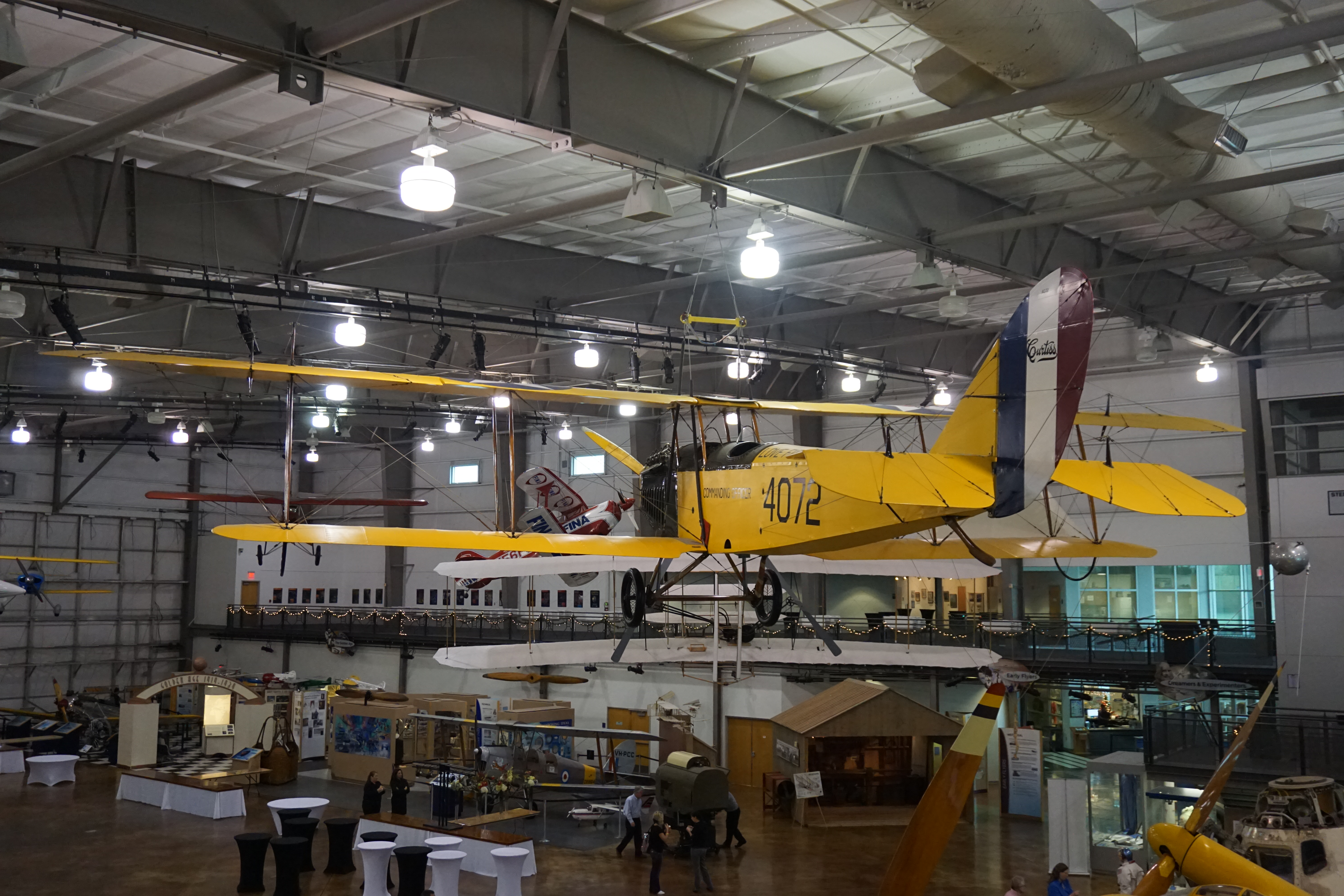
The JN-4D on display at the Frontiers of Flight Museum

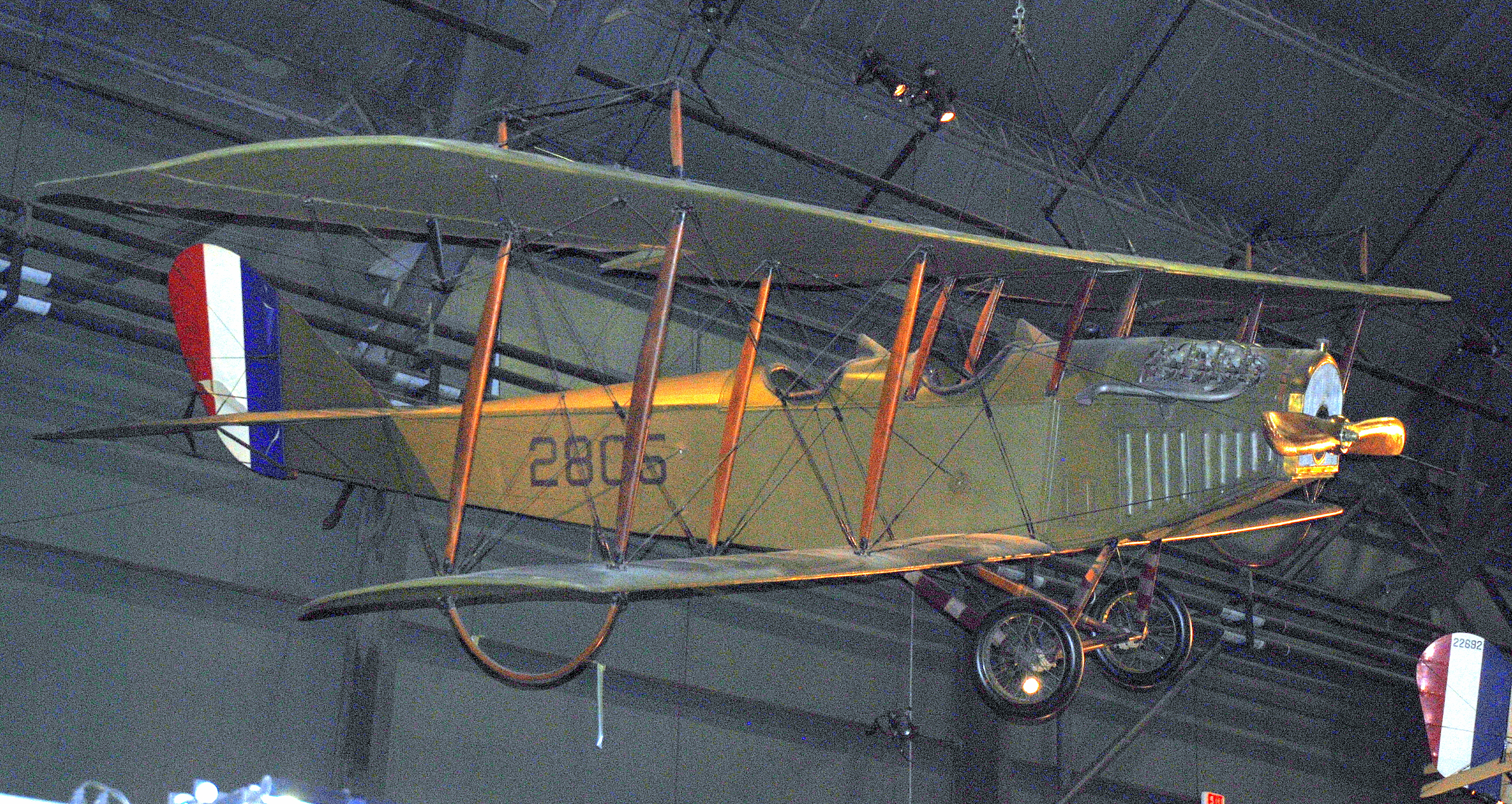
The JN-4D on display at the National Museum of the United States Air Force

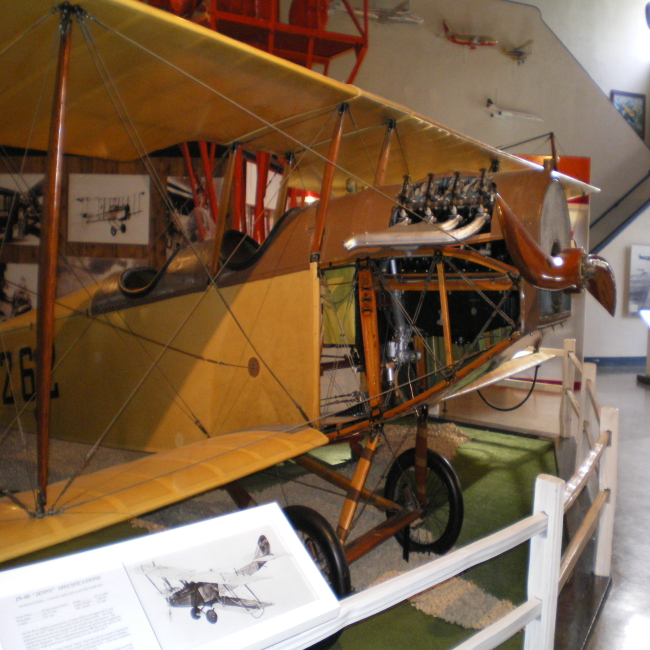
Curtiss JN-4D at the San Diego Air and Space Museum

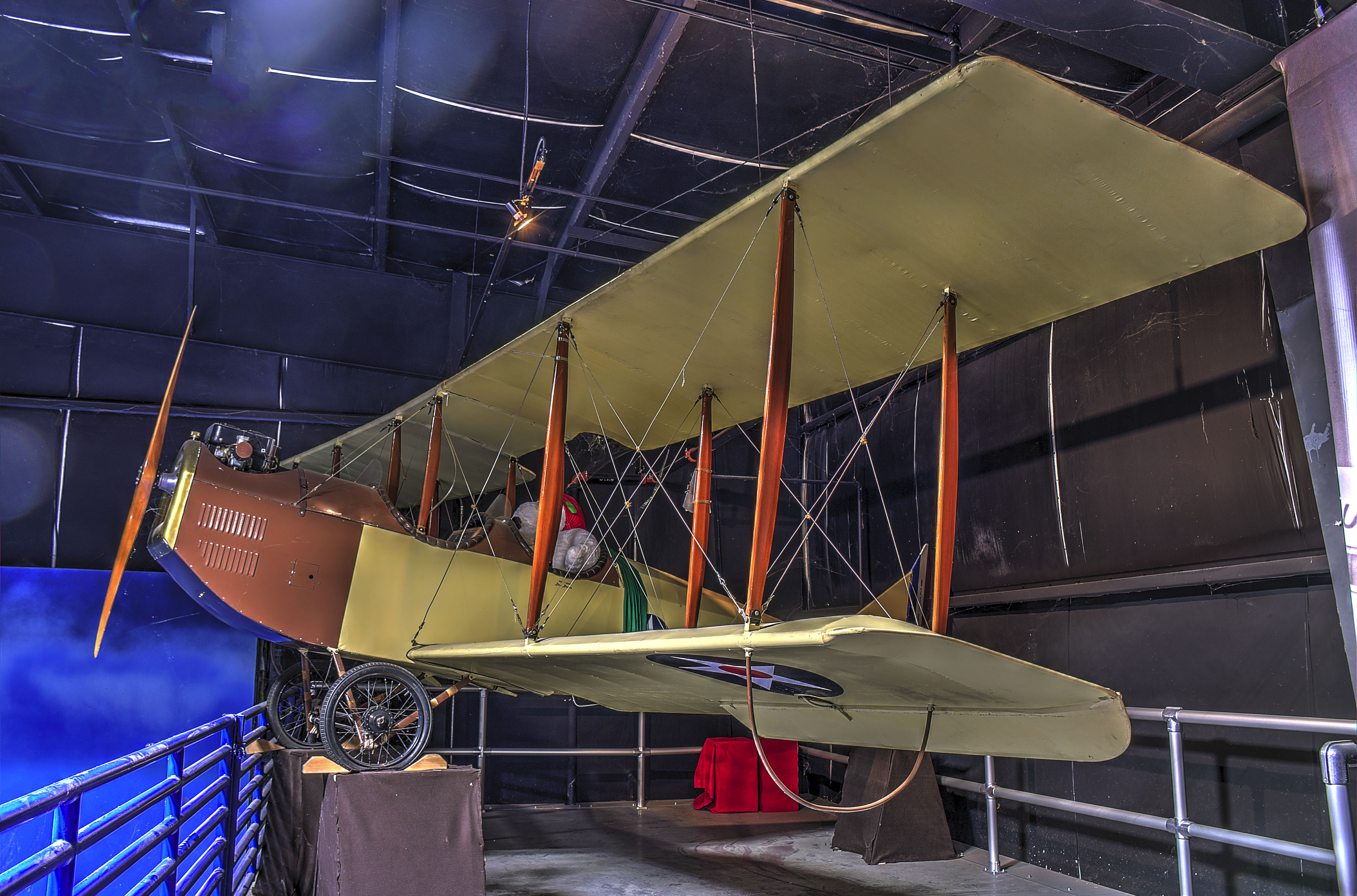
1917 JN-4 on display at the Museum of Aviation, Robins AFB

- 396 – JN-4D on static display at the San Diego Air and Space Museum in San Diego, California.
- 1282 – JN-4D airworthy at the Western Antique Aeroplane & Automobile Museum in Hood River, Oregon.
- 2805 – JN-4D on static display at the National Museum of the United States Air Force in Dayton, Ohio. It was obtained from Robert Pfiel of Taylor, Texas in 1956. The aircraft is displayed in the Museum's Early Years gallery.
- 3793 – JN-4D on static display at the Alberta Aviation Museum in Edmonton, Alberta.
- 3805 – JN-4D on static display in Terminal B at San Antonio International Airport in San Antonio, Texas. It is on loan from the Witte Museum.
- 5368 – JN-4D on static display at the Museum of Science and Industry in Chicago, Illinois. It is displayed upside down next to a wraparound balcony, and details of the cockpit can readily be seen. This airframe was built in 1917. It was cleaned and reskinned by Century Aviation in 2006.
- 6200 – JN-4D being restored for flight by Ranger Airfield Foundation in Ranger, Texas.
- 8644 – JN-4H airworthy at the Sonoma Valley Airport in Sonoma, California.
- 10875 – JN-4C owned by John Shue in York, Pennsylvania.
- MSN 65 – JN-4D on static display at the Denver International Airport in Denver, Colorado.
- MSN 450 – JN-4D airworthy at Fagen Fighters WWII Museum in Granite Falls, Minnesota. It was previously on display at the Virginia Aviation Museum in Richmond, Virginia, on loan from Ken Hyde of Warrenton, Virginia. This airframe was built in 1918.
- MSN 490 – JN-4D on static display at the National Naval Aviation Museum in Pensacola, Florida.
- MSN 3712 – JN-4D airworthy at the Flying Heritage Collection in Everett, Washington. This airframe was built in May 1918, and at one time served at March Field in Riverside, California.
- MSN 4072 – JN-4D on display at the Frontiers of Flight Museum in Dallas, Texas.
- MSN 4983 – JN-4D on static display at the Steven F. Udvar-Hazy Center of the National Air and Space Museum in Chantilly, Virginia.
- MSN 8047 – JN-4D airworthy at the Golden Age Air Museum in Bethel, Pennsylvania.
- USMC A4160 – JN-4HG on static display at the National Museum of the Marine Corps in Triangle, Virginia.
- USASC 34094 – JN-4D airworthy at the Owls Head Transportation Museum in Owls Head, Maine. This airframe was built in 1917 by the St. Louis Airplane Company.
- USASC 34135 – JN-4D airworthy at the Military Aviation Museum in Virginia Beach, Virginia.
- USASC 38428 – JN-4D on static display at The Henry Ford in Dearborn, Michigan.
- USASC 39158 – JN-4(Can) on static display at the Canada Aviation and Space Museum in Ottawa, Ontario. It is painted with the registration number C227. The airframe was acquired in 1962 and restoration was completed in May 1964.
- Replica – JN-4(Can) airworthy at the Eagle's Mere Air Museum in Eagles Mere, Pennsylvania. It was formerly owned by Skeeter Carlson of Spokane, Washington, and is painted as C1122.
- Replica – JN-4D-2 on display at the Combat Air Museum in Topeka, Kansas.
- Reproduction – JN-4D on display at the Museum of Flight in Seattle, Washington. The airframe was built up from parts.
- C1347 – JN-4(Can) on display at the Royal Alberta Museum in Edmonton, Alberta, on loan from the Reynolds-Alberta Museum in Wetaskiwin, Alberta.
- Unknown ID – JN-4(Can) airworthy at the Historic Aircraft Restoration Museum in Maryland Heights, Missouri.
- C308 – JN-4(Can) airworthy at the Pioneer Flight Museum in Kingsbury, Texas.
- Unknown ID – JN-4D on display at the Wichita Falls Municipal Airport in Wichita Falls, Texas. Its last flight was to the airport to be put on display.
- Unknown ID – JN-4D on static display in partially unskinned condition at EAA AirVenture Museum in Oshkosh, Wisconsin.
- Reproduction – JN-4H reproduction airworthy with Friends of Jenny in Bowling Green, Kentucky.
- 1187 – JN-4D on static display at the Cradle of Aviation Museum in Garden City, New York. This airframe is the aircraft owned by Charles Lindbergh in which he barnstormed long before his transatlantic flight. Lindbergh purchased this aircraft in Americus, Georgia, for $500 in May 1923, and sold it to his flying student in Iowa the following October. It was restored by the late George Dade in the 1970s, and is on loan from the Long Island Early Fliers Club.
- 10726 – JN-4D on static display in unskinned, wingless condition at the Cradle of Aviation Museum in Garden City, New York.
- Unknown ID – JN-4D on display at the Fantasy of Flight in Polk City, Florida.
- Unknown ID – JN-4D on static display as SC5002/43 at the Hill Aerospace Museum in Roy, Utah. Restored during the 1970s by Jim Nissen, and flown with c/r N5001.
- Unknown ID – JN-4D on static display in unskinned condition at the Yanks Air Museum in Chino, California.
- Unknown ID – JN-4D on display at the Yanks Air Museum in Chino, California.
- Unknown ID – JN-4D on static display at the Glenn H. Curtiss Museum in Hammondsport, New York.
- Unknown ID - JN-4D on display at Fairbanks International Airport in Fairbanks, Alaska.
- Unknown ID – JN-4H airworthy at the Old Rhinebeck Aerodrome in Red Hook, New York. It is painted as a US Navy Model 1E, BuNo A6226, and is powered by a Hispano-Suiza 8 engine.

== Specifications (JN-4D) ==
Curtiss JN-4B

Data from Curtiss Aircraft 1907–1947, The Encyclopedia of World Aircraft

General characteristics

- Crew: 2
- Length: 27 ft 4 in (8.33 m)
- Wingspan: 43 ft 7 3/4 in (13.30 m)
- Height: 9 ft 10 1/2 in (3.01 m)
- Wing area: 352 sq ft (32.7 m^{2})
- Airfoil: Eiffel 36
- Empty weight: 1,390 lb (630 kg)
- Gross weight: 1,920 lb (871 kg)
- Powerplant: 1 × Curtiss OX-5 V-8 water-cooled piston engine, 90 hp (67 kW)
- Propellers: 2-bladed fixed-pitch propeller

Performance

- Maximum speed: 75 mph (121 km/h, 65 kn)
- Cruise speed: 60 mph (97 km/h, 52 kn)
- Service ceiling: 6,500 ft (2,000 m)
- Time to altitude: 2,000 ft (610 m) in 7 minutes 30 seconds

== Commemorations ==
An image of the Curtis Jenny appeared on the first airmail stamps issued by the U.S. Post Office in 1918

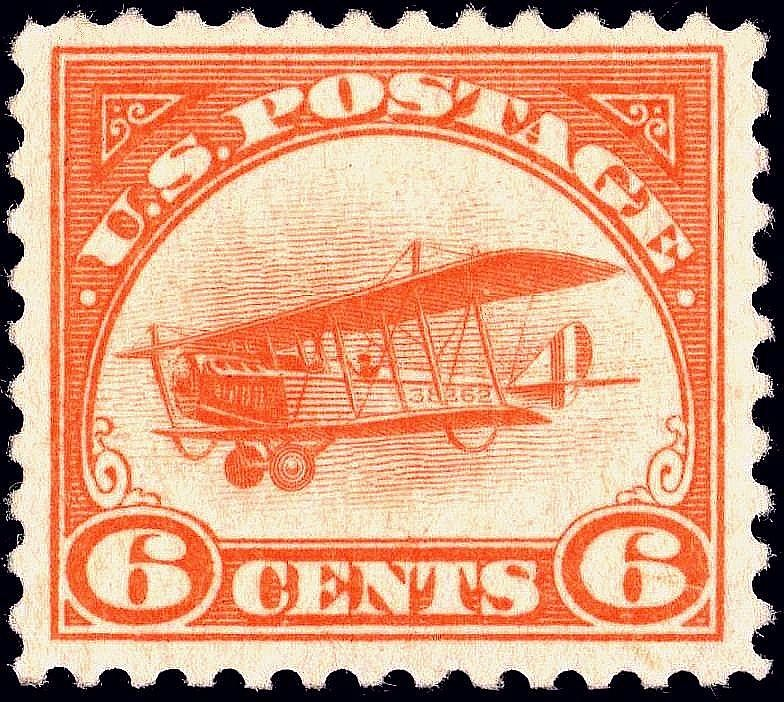

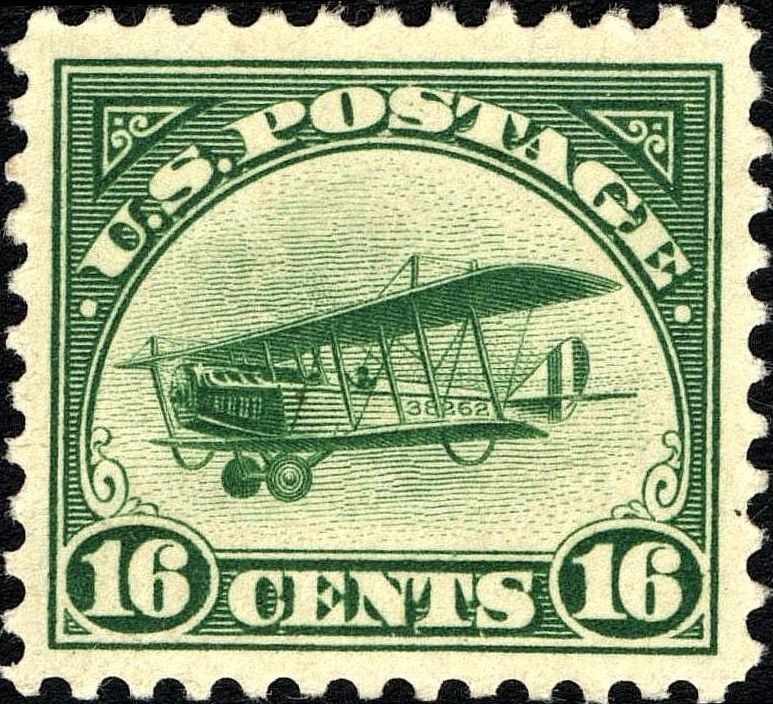

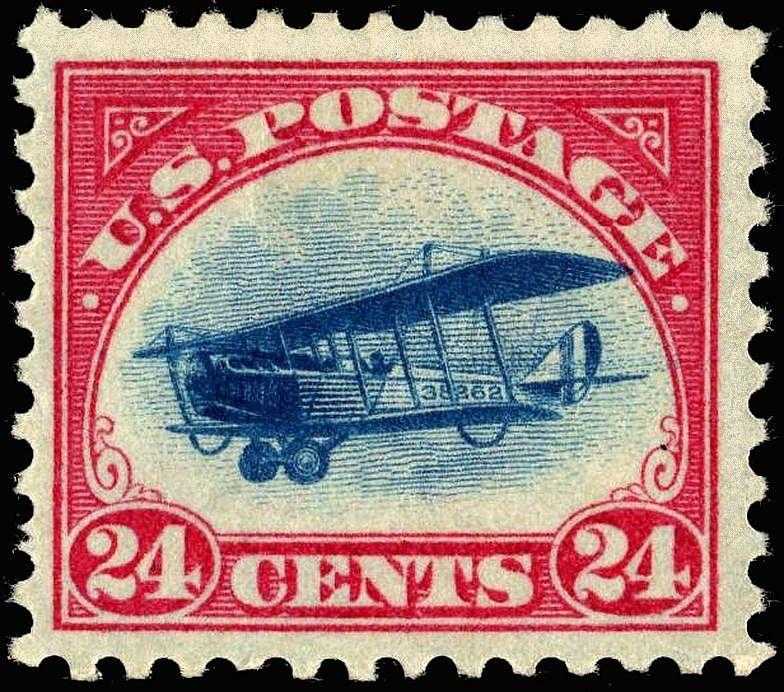

=== The "Inverted Jenny" stamp ===
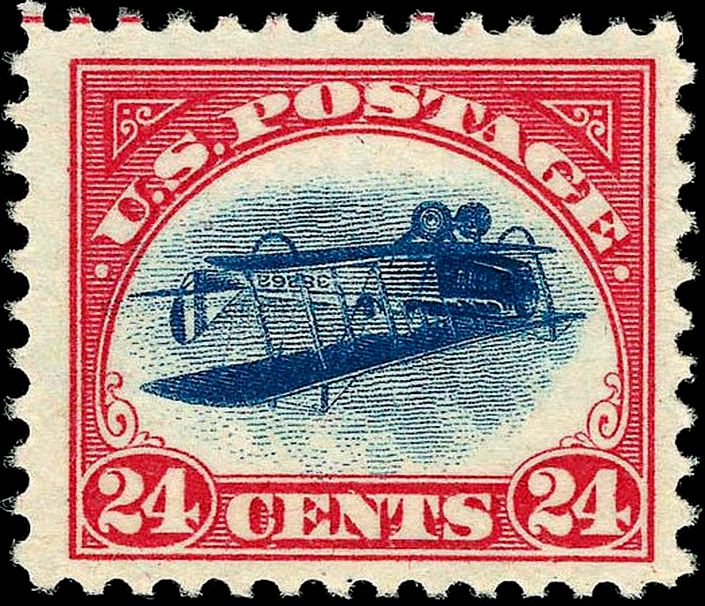
"Inverted Jenny" (C-3a P57)

The "Inverted Jenny" (C-3a) is a 24-cent 1918 US Air Mail postage stamp printing error in which the blue central vignette of US Army Curtiss JN-4HM #38262, the nation's first mailplane, appeared as "inverted" on a single sheet of 100 stamps. (Note: The printing error occurred when an operator of a hand-rolled spider press by printing the blue vignette impressions upside down after the red frames had previously been printed on the sheet. As the Jenny vignette was only inverted on one sheet, this stamp represents the rarest and most valuable known USPOD printing error of all time. A single example (sheet position 57) sold at auction in 2007 for $977,500.00. The stamp was reissued for a limited time as a $2 stamp in October 2013.)

=== Notable appearances in media ===
In 1921, Lee De Forest made a short film Flying Jenny Airplane in his Phonofilm sound-on-film process. The film depicted a JN-4 flying, and recorded the sound of the Jenny, as well. The short documentary was the first production of the De Forest Phonofilm company.

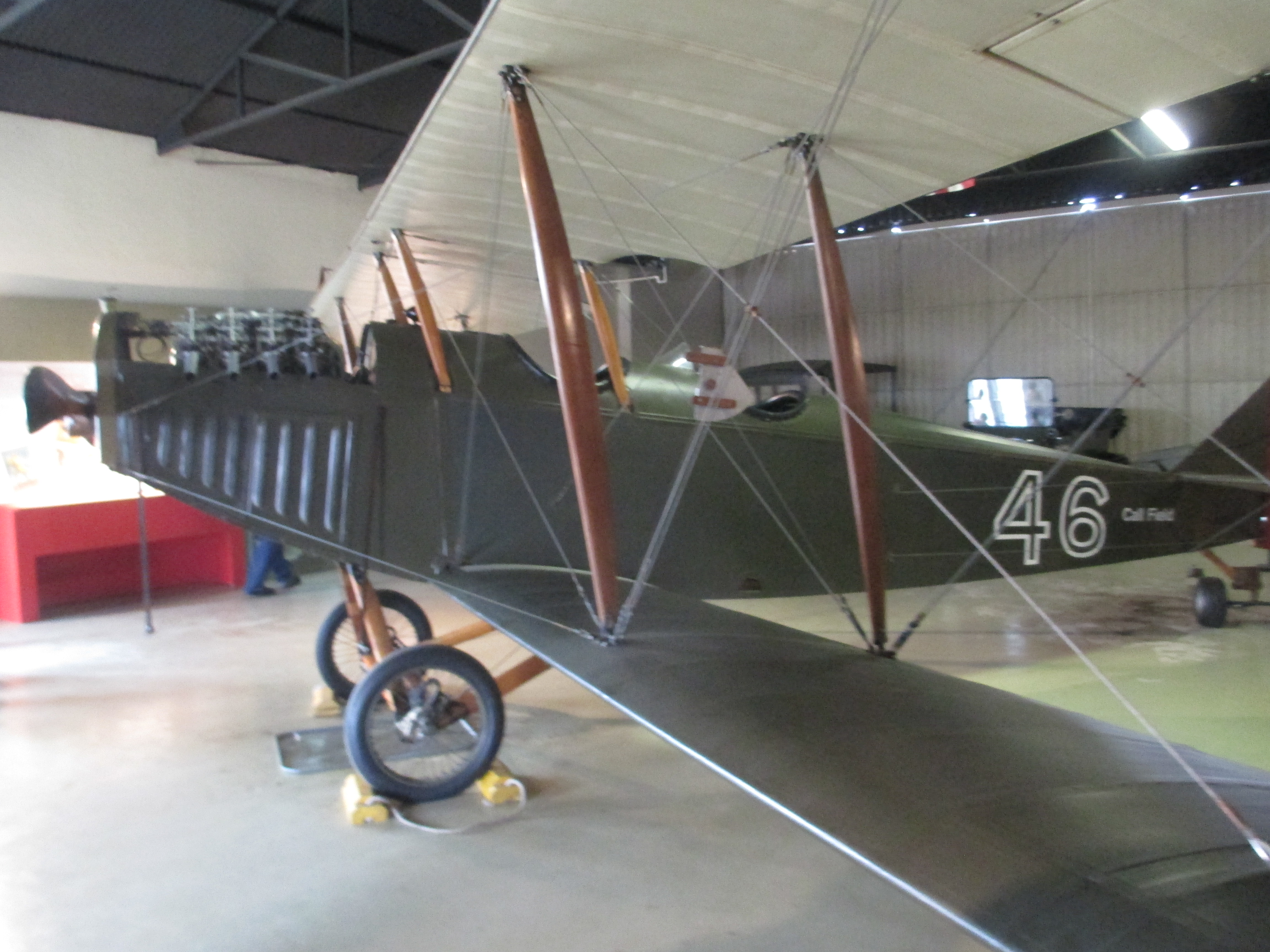
This 1917 Curtiss Jenny still flies on occasion. Its home base is the Call Memorial Museum in Wichita Falls, Texas.

Among many later films depicting the barnstorming era when the Jennys "ruled supreme" and played a feature role, was The Spirit of St. Louis (1957) and The Great Waldo Pepper (1974). In The Court Martial of Billy Mitchell (1955), authentic OX-5 Jennys were showcased as United States Army Air Service training aircraft. Broadcast on April 15, 1987, by PBS, the National Geographic special entitled "Treasures from the Past" featured the restoration and first flight by Ken Hyde of a JN-4D that would go on to win the "Lindy Award" at the EAA AirVenture Oshkosh '87.

The stamp also made an appearance in the 1985 film starring Richard Pryor, Brewster's Millions, in which the titular character mails an "Inverted Jenny" stamp as part of a ploy to very quickly and frivolously spend as much money as possible.

== See also ==
- Airmails of the United States
- John J. Pershing
- Standard J, the Jenny's primary "competitor" for both its military contract and in civilian barnstorming aviation exhibitions
- Early Bird Jenny, a homebuilt kit aircraft replica of the JN-4

== Bibliography ==
- Angelucci, Enzo. Great Aeroplanes of the World. London: Hamlyn, 1973. ISBN 0-600-38663-5.
- Auliard, Gilles. "Maiden of the Skies." Air Classics, Volume 45, No. 4, April 2009.
- Bowers, Peter M. "Jenny's Younger Sister." Air Progress, Volume 18, No. 2, February/March 1966.
- Chajkowsky, William E. Royal Flying Corps: Borden to Texas to Beamsville. Eden Prairie, Ontario, Canada: Boston Mills Press, 1979. ISBN 978-0-919822-23-8.
- Donald, David, ed. The Encyclopedia of World Aircraft. London: Aerospace Publishing, 1997. ISBN 1-85605-375-X.
- Hagedorn, Dan (March–May 1992). "Curtiss Types in Latin America". Air Enthusiast. No. 45. pp. 61–77. ISSN 0143-5450.
- Harwick, Jack and Ed Schnepf. "A Viewer's Guide to Aviation Movies". The Making of the Great Aviation Films, General Aviation Series, Volume 2, 1989.
- House, Kirk W. Hell-Rider to King of the Air. Warrendale, Pennsylvania: SAE International, 2003. ISBN 0-7680-0802-6.
- Hurd, William W. and John G. Jernigan. Aeromedical Evacuation: Management of Acute and Stabilized Patients. New York: Springer Publishing, 2002. ISBN 978-0-387-98604-3.
- Jones, A.D. Aerial Mail Service: A Chronology of the Early United States Government Air Mail, March–December, 1918. Mineola, New York: The American Air Mail Society, 1993. ISBN 978-0-939429-14-1.
- Larson, Lt. Col. George A., USAF (Ret.). "Hunting Pancho: The 1st Aero Squadron's Air Operations in support of the Army's 1916 punitive expedition." Air Classics, Volume 40, no. 6, June 2004.
- Lindbergh, Charles A. "WE". New York & London: G. P. Putnam's Sons (The Knickerbocker Press), 1927.
- Molson, Ken M. "The Canadian JN-4." Canadian Aeronautics and Space Journal, Volume 10, No. 3, March 1964.
- Molson, K.M. Pioneering in Canadian Air Transport. Winnipeg: James Richardson & Sons, Ltd., 1974. ISBN 0-919212-39-5.
- Molson, Ken M. and Harold A. Taylor. Canadian Aircraft Since 1909. Stittsville, Ontario: Canada's Wings, Inc., 1982. ISBN 0-920002-11-0.
- Nowarra, Heinz J. Gezielter Sturz. Die Geschichte der Sturzkampfbomber aus aller Welt (in German). Stuttgart: Motorbuch Verlag, 1982. ISBN 3-87943-844-7.
- Roseberry, C.R. Glenn Curtiss: Pioneer of Flight, A Biography. Garden City, New York: Doubleday & Company, 1972. ISBN 0-8156-0264-2.
- United States Air Force Museum Guidebook. Wright-Patterson AFB, Ohio: Air Force Museum Foundation, 1975.
- Winchester, Jim, ed. "Curtiss JN-4 'Jenny'." Biplanes, Triplanes and Seaplanes (Aviation Factfile). London: Grange Books plc, 2004. ISBN 1-84013-641-3.
