= Curtiss JN-6H =

American biplane trainer aircraft

Curtiss JN-6H (Model 1F)
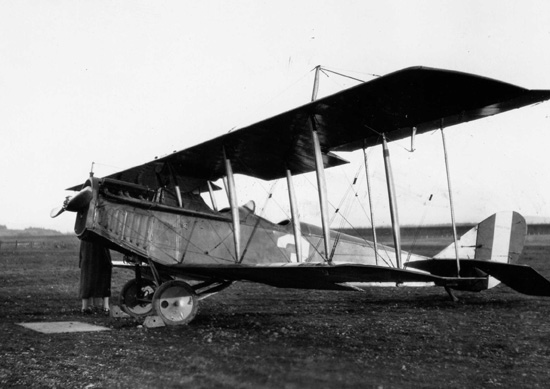

General information
- Type: Biplane trainer aircraft
- Manufacturer: Curtiss
- Primary users: United States Army Air Service United States Navy
- Number built: 1,035

History
- Manufactured: 1918
- Developed from: Curtiss JN

The Curtiss JN-6H (Model 1F) was an American biplane trainer aircraft built by Curtiss for the United States Army Air Service during World War I.

== Design and development ==
Developed from the one-off JN-5H advanced trainer, the 6H had a superior aileron operation mechanism. It was used in a variety of roles, with stick and rudder in either one seat or both: JN-6HB single-control bomber trainer (154 built), JN-6HG-1 dual-control gunnery trainer (560 built), JN-6HG-2 single-control gunnery trainer (90 built), JN-6HO single-control observation trainer (106 built), and JN-6HP single-control pursuit trainer (125 built), a total of 1,035; five went to the Navy.

The airframe did not differ substantially from the JN-4H (Model 1E), and used the same 150 hp (112 kW) Hispano-Suiza 8A ("Hisso") V8, which weighed 408 lb (185 kg).

Some of the aircraft were modernized as the Curtiss JNH and later to the Curtiss JNS (JN Standard) with either a 180 hp (134 kW) Wright-Hispano E (as JNS-E) or 150 hp (112 kW) Wright-Hispano I engine (as JNS-I).

== Variants ==
JN-6H
Bomber training variant
JN-6HB
Single-control bomber trainer, 154 built
JN-6HG-1
dual-control gunnery trainer, one dorsal guns, 560 built.
JN-6HG-2
single-control gunnery trainer, two dorsal guns, 90 built
JN-6HO
single-control observation trainer, 106 built
JN-6HP
Pursuit training version, 125 built.

== Operators ==
United States

- United States Army Air Service
- United States Navy

== Specifications ==
General characteristics

- Crew: 1 (pilot)
- Length: 26 ft 11 in (8.2 m)
- Wingspan: 43 ft 7 in (13.28 m)
- Height: 9 ft 10.5 in (3.01 m)
- Gross weight: 2,750 lb (1,247 kg)
- Powerplant: 1 × Hispano-Suiza 8A water-cooled 8-cylinder vee aircraft piston engine , 150 hp (110 kW)

Performance

- Maximum speed: 80 mph (128 km/h, 70 kn)

Armament

- 1 × fixed, forward-firing .30 in (7.62 mm) machine gun in cowl (JN-6HG-1) or
- 2 × fixed, forward-firing .30 in (7.62 mm) machine guns in cowl (JN-6HG-2)

== See also ==
Related lists

- List of military aircraft of the United States
