= Curtiss Model N =

1915 American trainer floatplane

Model N
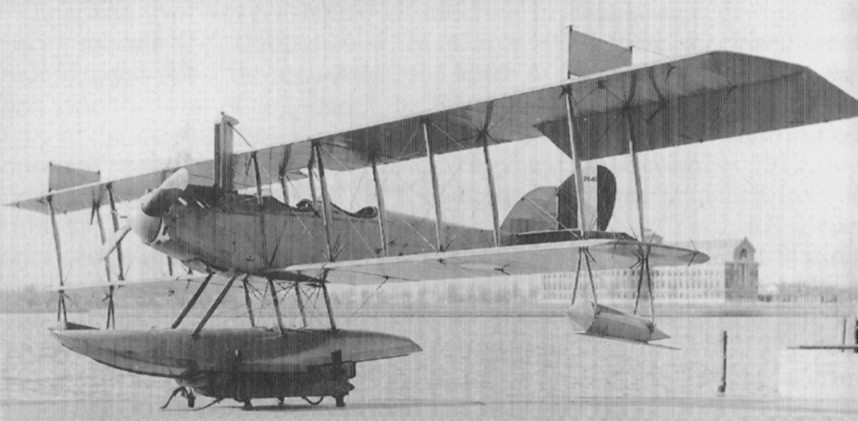
- Curtiss N-9H

General information
- Type: trainer
- Manufacturer: Curtiss, Burgess Company
- Designer: Glenn Curtiss
- Primary user: United States Navy
- Number built: 560

History
- First flight: 1915
- Developed from: Curtiss Model J
- Developed into: Curtiss JN Jenny

The Curtiss Model N is a military trainer used primarily by the United States Navy during World War I.

== Design and development ==
The Model N was a two-seat biplane similar to the Model J, differing in the airfoil and placement of the ailerons, which were mounted between the wings. It was powered by a 90-100 hp Curtiss OX inline engine. Due to legal issues with the Wright brothers over the use of ailerons, the sole Model N was modified by locking the ailerons and increasing dihedral to seven degrees in an effort to prove that aircraft could be flown without ailerons or wing warping.

The most prolific variant, the N-9, was a floatplane equipped with a single central pontoon mounted under the fuselage. A small float was fitted under each wingtip. With the additional weight of the pontoon, a number of structural and aerodynamic changes were required, the design of which made use of wind tunnel data developed at the Massachusetts Institute of Technology, meaning the N-9 was the first American naval aircraft to incorporate wind tunnel data directly into its design. The wingspan was stretched an additional ten feet (three meters), the fuselage was lengthened, the tail surfaces were enlarged, and stabilizing fins were added on top of the upper wing. The N-9 was initially powered by a 100 hp (75 kW) Curtiss OXX-6 engine.

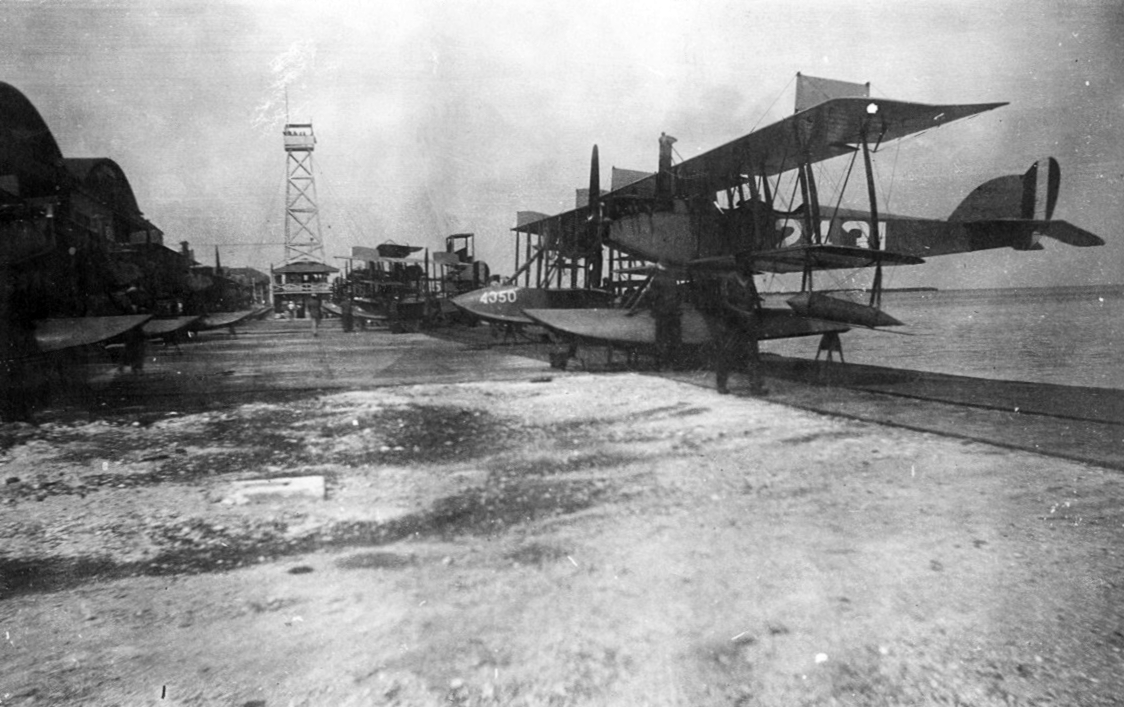
U.S. Navy N-9s and Curtiss Model Fs at Naval Air Station Key West

Curtiss was awarded an initial contract for 30 aircraft in August 1916, and an additional 14 were ordered by the United States Army, which maintained a small seaplane operation. It quickly became apparent that the aircraft was underpowered, so Curtiss replaced the engine with a 150 hp (112 kW) Hispano-Suiza, manufactured in the United States under license by Wright-Martin's Simplex division (later Wright Aeronautical). The aircraft was redesignated N-9H.

A total of 560 N-9s were built during World War I, most of which were "H" models. Only 100 were actually built by Curtiss. Most were built under license by the Burgess Company of Marblehead, Massachusetts. Fifty others were assembled after the war, from spare components and engines by the U.S. Navy at Naval Air Station Pensacola in Florida.

== Operational history ==
The first flight of the Model N took place in 1915. The United States Army purchased the aircraft for evaluation, but Curtiss repossessed it due to legal issues with the Wright brothers.

Although the consensus in early 1917 among aviators and even the N-9's manufacturer was that the N-9 could not be looped, the pioneering early United States Marine Corps aviator Francis Thomas Evans, Sr., believed it was possible. On 13 February 1917, he flew an N-9 over the Gulf of Mexico off Pensacola, Florida, and began attempts to loop it. He succeeded on his fourth try, becoming one of the first persons ever to loop a seaplane (first pilot to loop a seaplane was Polish aviator Jan Nagórski on 17 September 1916 in Grigorovich M-9 flying boat). Lacking witnesses, he flew over Naval Air Station Pensacola and repeated the feat. In 1936, he received the Distinguished Flying Cross for this achievement. More important, however, were the stall and spin recovery techniques he discovered while flying the N-9 that day. During his first three loop attempts, the N-9 stalled before he reached the apex of the loop and fell into a spin. He found that by releasing back-pressure on the stick and aggressively applying opposite rudder to the direction of the spin he could change the spin into a normal dive and recover, something previously thought impossible in an N-9. His stall and spin recovery techniques remain in use to this day by aviators around the world.

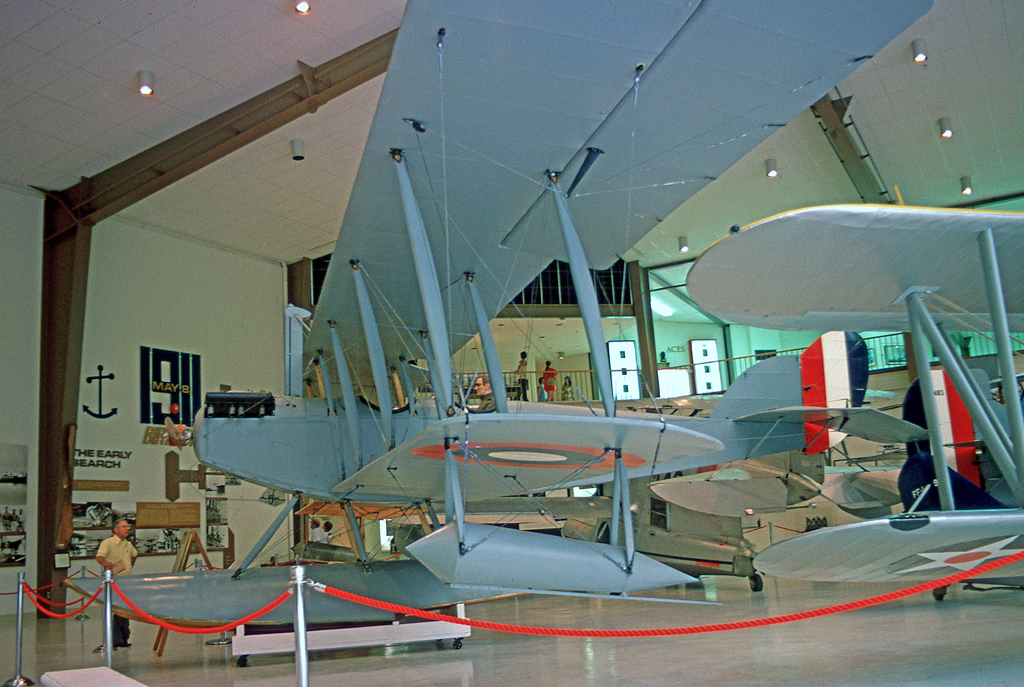
Preserved Curtiss N-9H exhibited at the National Museum of Naval Aviation at Pensacola, Florida in 1975.

Over 2,500 U.S. Navy pilots received their seaplane training in N-9s. Besides this primary role, though, the aircraft was also used to help develop shipborne aircraft operations during World War I, especially the development of ship-mounted launch catapults. In 1917, several N-9s were provided to the Sperry Gyroscope Company for conversion to the Hewitt-Sperry Automatic Airplane configuration, flight testing the new autopilot components intended to be used in pilotless "aerial torpedoes".

The U.S. Navy retired the N-9s in 1927 as more modern trainers became available.

== Surviving aircraft ==
Only one example of the type has survived, and is now a part of the National Air and Space Museum collection. Originally on display at the Museum of Science and Industry in Chicago, Illinois, it was later transferred back to the U.S. Navy pending transport to the National Air and Space Museum. The Naval Air Engineering Laboratory in Philadelphia, Pennsylvania, fully restored it in 1966.

== Variants ==
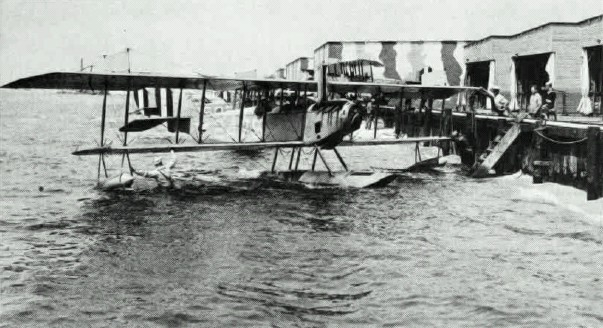
A Curtiss N-9 at Naval Air Station Pensacola

Model N
1914 two-seat trainer powered by 100 hp (75 kW) Curtiss OXX engine, similar to Model J but with different airfoil section. One built for US Army. Later rebuilt as Model O with side-by side seating.
Model N-8
Production version of N for US Army, powered by 90 hp (67 kW) Curtiss OX-2 engine. Equivalent to JN-3. Four built 1915.
Model N-9
Two-seat single-engined trainer floatplane.
Model N-9C
The original N-9 floatplane with the 100 hp (75 kW) engine later became unofficially known as the N-9C.
Model N-9H
Main production variant powered by 150 hp (112 kW) Hispano-Suiza
Murray-Carnes all steel airplane
This aircraft was an all steel development of the Curtiss N-9 requested by secretary Daniels of the Navy Department in 1918 from the J.W. Murray Mfg. Co. of Detroit

== Operators ==
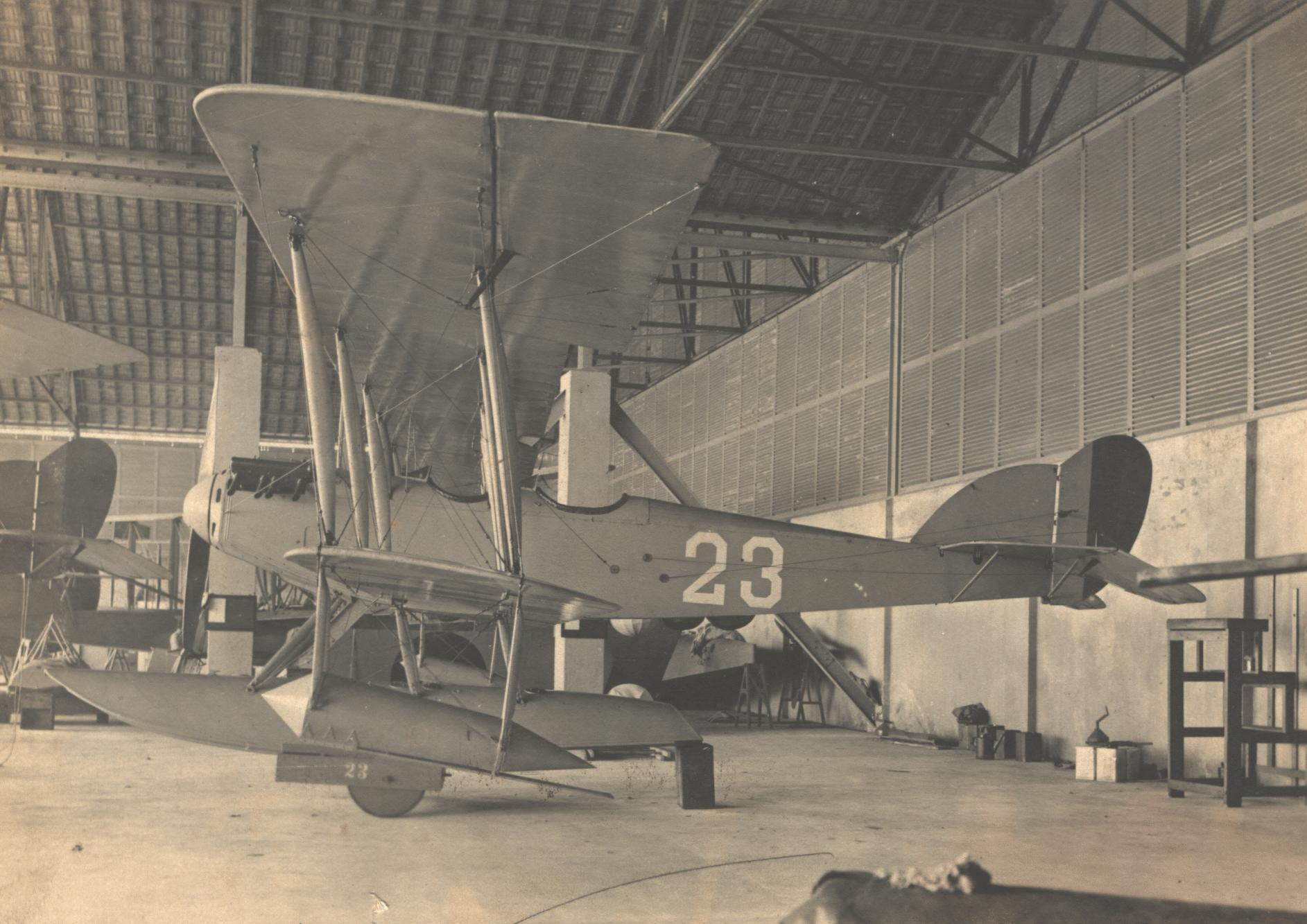
Brazilian N-9H

Brazil

- Brazilian Naval Aviation – N-9H

United States

- United States Army
- United States Marine Corps
- United States Navy

== Specifications (N-9H) ==
Data from Curtiss Aircraft 1907–1947

General characteristics

- Crew: 2
- Length: 30 ft 10 in (9.40 m)
- Wingspan: 53 ft 4 in (16.26 m)
- Height: 10 ft 11 in (3.33 m)
- Wing area: 496 sq ft (46.1 m^{2})
- Empty weight: 2,140 lb (971 kg)
- Gross weight: 2,750 lb (1,247 kg)
- Powerplant: 1 × Wright-Hisso A V-8 water-cooled piston engine, 150 hp (110 kW)
- Propellers: 2-bladed fixed-pitch wooden propeller

Performance

- Maximum speed: 78 mph (126 km/h, 68 kn)
- Service ceiling: 6,600 ft (2,000 m)
- Time to altitude: 3,240 ft (990 m) in 10 minutes

== Bibliography ==
- Bowers, Peter M. Curtiss Aircraft 1907–1947. London: Putnam, 1979. ISBN 0-370-10029-8.
- Hagedorn, Dan (March–May 1992). "Curtiss Types in Latin America". Air Enthusiast. No. 45. pp. 61–77. ISSN 0143-5450.
- National Air and Space Museum information
- "New Curtiss Military Tractor". Aeronautics. XV (7): 104. 15 October 1914. hdl:2027/chi.105942614. (Brief description of the original Model N of 1914, with illustrations.)
