= Curtiss Model J =

1914 prototype biplane

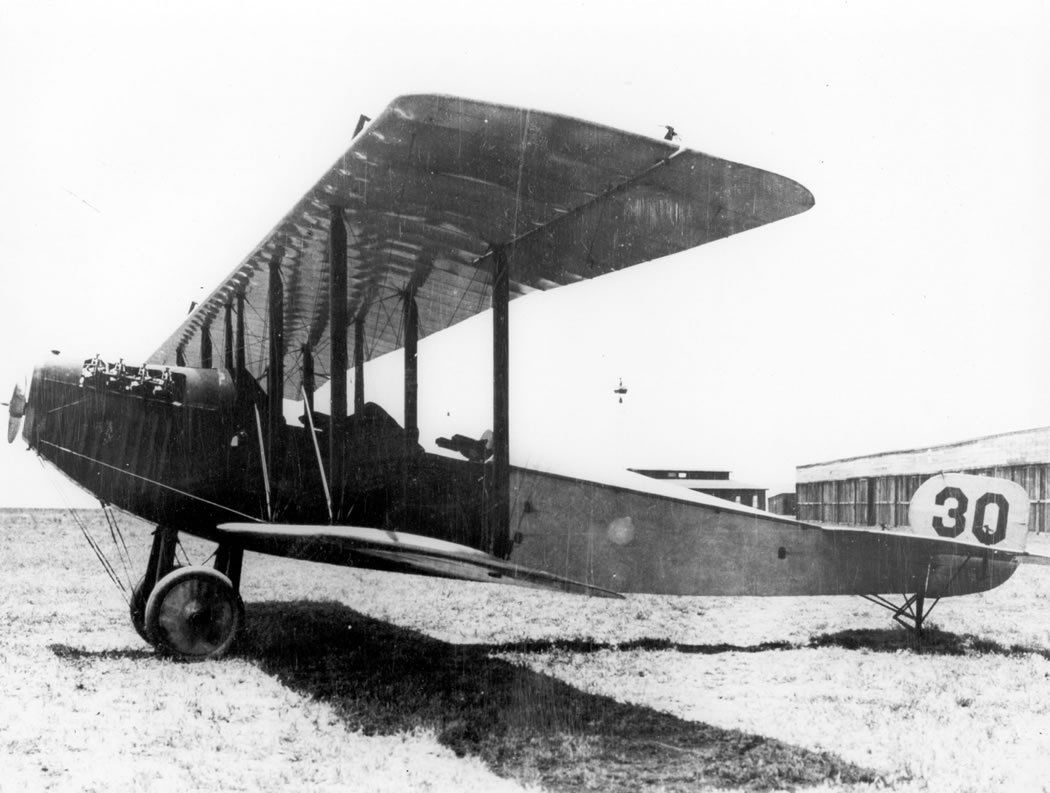
- Curtiss J Tractor, Signal Corps No. 30, Rockwell Field, California

General information
- Type: Biplane
- National origin: United States of America
- Manufacturer: Curtiss Aeroplane Company
- Designer: Benjamin D. Thomas
- Number built: 2

History
- Introduction date: 1914
- First flight: 12 March 1914

The Curtiss Model J (along with the Curtiss Model N) was a prototype tractor configuration aircraft that became the basis for the Curtiss Jenny series of aircraft.

== Development ==
The Curtiss J was designed by Benjamin D. Thomas. Glenn Curtiss hired Thomas from the Sopwith Aviation Company while on a trip to London, England. He started designing the Model J while overseas, and is also credited with helping design the Model N and the Model H "America". The first flight tests were performed without fuselage covering. In February 1914, after a series of accidents with pusher aircraft, the U.S. Army held a meeting in San Diego expressing interest in tractor design aircraft such as the Model J

== Design ==
The Model J had the engine mounted on the nose of the aircraft with a tractor propeller and was covered with clear doped linen or cotton, with tandem seating and conventional landing gear with a tailskid. The biplane wings were built without dihedral and the upper wing was considerably greater in span than the lower and fitted with ailerons. The Curtiss Model J S.C. No. 30 became the testing prototype for the JN, earning the title as the first "Jenny".

== Operational history ==
The first prototype was rolled out on 12 March 1914. It was delivered to the Aviation Section, U.S. Signal Corps on 28 July. At the time the entire United States military air fleet consisted of 23 aircraft.

- 1914 In September, pilot Lewis E. Goodier, Jr. achieved a record climb rate for an aircraft of 1000 ft per minute. Later that month the Model J would become the fastest aircraft in America with a recorded speed of 85.7 mph

1914 October 8, SN30 flown by Capt. H. Le R. Muller reached a record altitude of 17,441 ft

- 1915 Both model J aircraft crashed in testing.

== Variants ==
- A Model J was demonstrated with floats in 1915 at Keuka Lake
- Curtiss J-2 - A smaller design of the Model J, cancelled.
- Curtiss Model N - The first prototype was built off a Model J modified in Hammondsport, New York.

== Specifications (Curtiss Model J) ==
Data from Curtiss Aircraft 1907–1947

General characteristics

- Crew: two
- Length: 26 ft 4 in (8.03 m)
- Wingspan: 40 ft 2 in (12.24 m)
- Wing area: 340 sq ft (32 m^{2})
- Empty weight: 1,075 lb (488 kg)
- Gross weight: 1,635 lb (742 kg)
- Powerplant: 1 × Curtiss OX-2 , 90 hp (67 kW)

Performance

- Maximum speed: 70 mph (110 km/h, 61 kn)
- Endurance: 4 hr
- Time to altitude: 10 min to 3,000 ft (915 m)

== See also ==
Related development

- Curtiss Model N
