= Francis Thomas Evans Sr. =

American pioneer aviator (1886–1974)

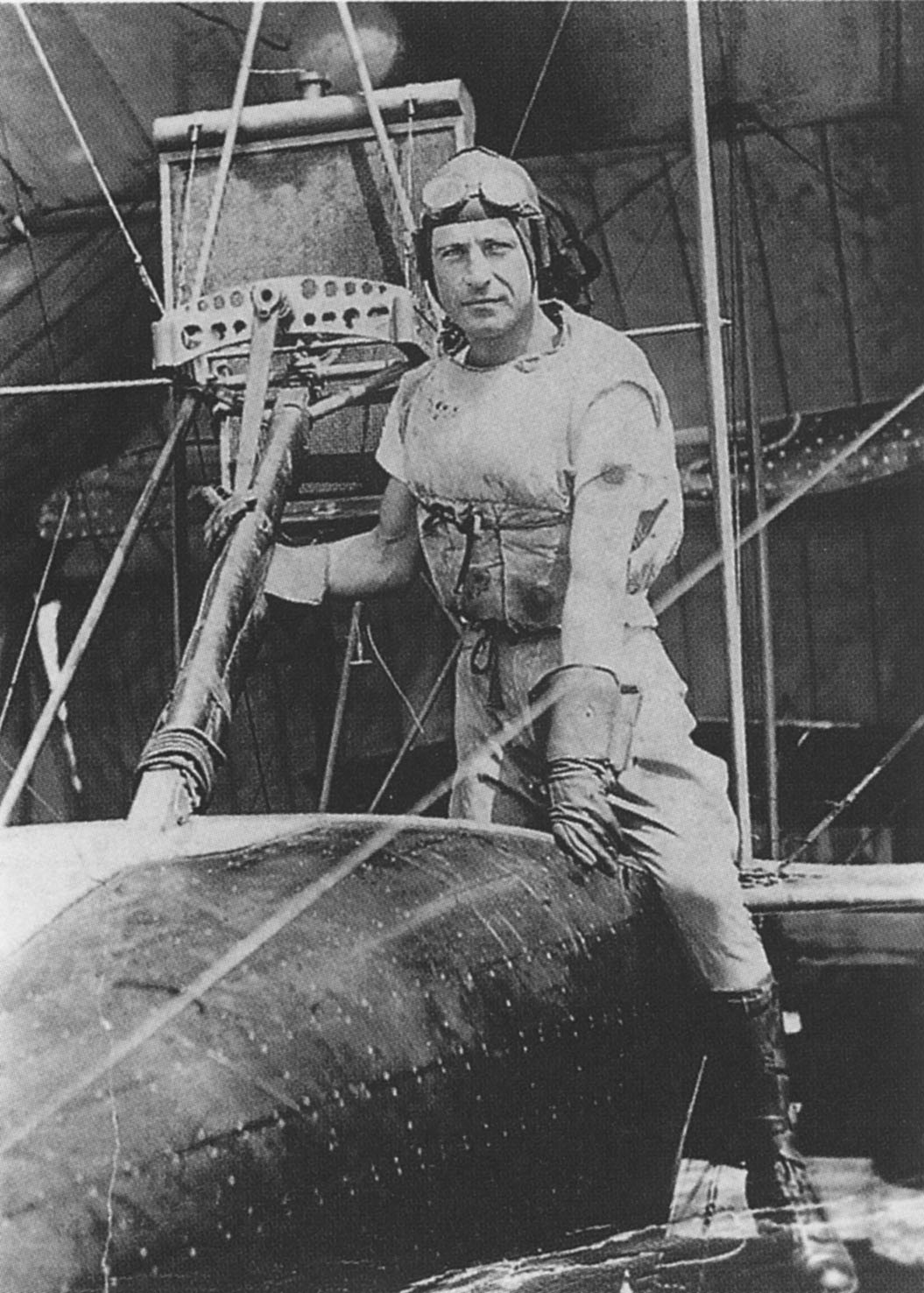
- Born: June 3, 1886; Delaware, Ohio
- Died: March 14, 1974 (aged 87)
- Burial place: Arlington National Cemetery, Arlington, Virginia
- Military career
- Allegiance: United States of America
- Branch: United States Marine Corps
- Service years: 1904–1907, 1909–1938, 1939–1944
- Rank: Colonel
- Commands: Seaplane Squadron, Azores, 1918
- Conflicts: World War I World War II
- Awards: Distinguished Flying Cross

Francis Thomas Evans Sr. (3 June 1886 – 14 March 1974) was a pioneer aviator. He was one of the earliest United States Marine Corps aviators, one of the first persons to perform a loop in a seaplane, and a pioneer of stall and spin recovery techniques.

== Biography ==
Evans was born in Delaware, Ohio, on 3 June 1886. He served as an enlisted member of the Ohio National Guard from 9 August 1904 to 8 August 1907 and attended Ohio Wesleyan University until 1908, becoming a member of Beta Theta Pi. Evans accepted a commission as a second lieutenant in the Marine Corps on 24 January 1909. He became one of the earliest United States Marine Corps aviators, being designated Naval Aviator Number 26 and Marine Aviator Number 4.

By early 1917, Evans was the most experienced Curtiss N-9 floatplane pilot in the world. Although the consensus among aviators and even the N-9's manufacturer was that the N-9 could not be looped, Evans believed it was possible. On February 13, 1917, he flew an N-9 over the Gulf of Mexico off Pensacola, Florida, and began attempts to loop it. He succeeded on his fourth try, becoming one of the first persons ever to loop a seaplane (the first pilot to loop a seaplane was Polish aviator Jan Nagórski on 17 September 1916 in Grigorovich M-9 flying boat). Lacking witnesses, he flew over Naval Air Station Pensacola and repeated the feat. In 1936, he received the Distinguished Flying Cross for this achievement.

More important, however, were the stall and spin recovery techniques he discovered that day. During his first three loop attempts, the N-9 stalled before he reached the apex of the loop and fell into a spin. He found that by releasing back-pressure on the stick and aggressively applying opposite rudder to the direction of the spin he could change the spin into a normal dive and recover, something previously thought impossible in an N-9. His stall and spin recovery techniques remain in use to this day by aviators around the world.

During World War I, Evans was stationed in the Azores in 1918 in command of a seaplane squadron.

Evans took actions after the 29 June 1925 earthquake in Santa Barbara, California, to help save the city from fire, for which he received a letter of commendation from the United States Secretary of the Navy and a resolution from the City of Santa Barbara.

The Marine Corps lacked any kind of ambulance aircraft in the 1920s and early 1930s, so Evans came up with a way of housing a stretcher and a medical attendant aboard a modified Douglas P2D-1 patrol floatplane, and the Marine Corps used the modified aircraft in support of its occupation duties in Haiti and Santo Domingo.

Evans was grounded after two serious crashes in 1935 and was retired for physical disability in July 1938. However, he was recalled to duty in October 1939 and continued to serve in the Marine Corps until December 1944.

== Family ==
Evans was married to Elizabeth Kibbey, daughter of John D. Kibbey and his wife Clara Egerton, of Marshalltown, Iowa. Their oldest son, Captain Francis T. Evans Jr., USAF, served in Europe during World War II as a United States Army Air Forces fighter pilot and later served in the United States Air Force. He died on 16 June 1953 while attempting to land his disabled F-86 Sabre fighter at Andrews Air Force Base, Maryland, when he put the F-86 into a nosedive to avoid crashing into a playground full of children at Forestville Elementary School in Forestville, Maryland. Francis T. Evans Elementary School in Clinton, Maryland, is named in honor of him.

A younger son, Captain Douglas K. Evans, served in the U.S. Army Air Forces and then in the U.S. Air Force in the Korean War and Vietnam War as a jet fighter pilot. Douglas Evans took Francis T. Evans Sr., on his first jet airplane flight on 4 January 1947, in a T-33 Shooting Star.

== Death ==
Francis T. Evans Sr., died on 14 March 1974 after six years of declining health. He is buried in Arlington National Cemetery in Arlington, Virginia.
