= Hewitt–Sperry Automatic Airplane =

1917 American flying bomb

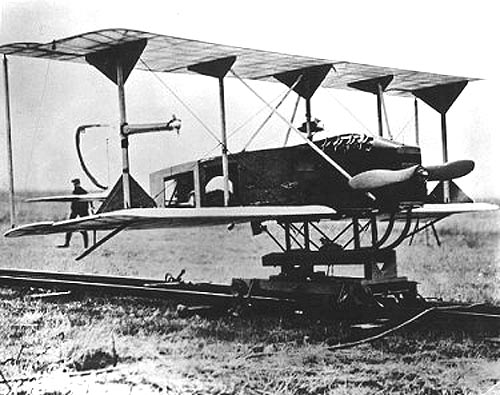
- Hewitt–Sperry Automatic Airplane in 1918

General information
- Type: Missile
- National origin: United States
- Designer: Elmer Sperry; Peter Cooper Hewitt
- Status: Development discontinued
- Primary user: United States Navy
- Number built: 7 Curtiss Model N-based prototypes; 6 Curtiss-Sperry Flying Bomb prototypes

History
- First flight: September 1917
- Developed from: Curtiss Model N

The Hewitt–Sperry Automatic Airplane was a project undertaken during World War I to develop a flying bomb, or pilotless aircraft capable of carrying explosives to its target. It is considered by some to be a precursor of the cruise missile. It was funded by the US Navy and created by Elmer Sperry.

== Conceptual development ==
Before World War I, the possibility of using radio to control aircraft intrigued many inventors. One of these, Elmer Sperry, succeeded in arousing the US Navy's interest. Sperry had been perfecting gyroscopes for naval use since 1896 and established the Sperry Gyroscope Company in 1910. In 1911, airplanes had only been flying for eight years, and yet Sperry became intrigued with the concept of applying radio control to them. He realized that for radio control to be effective, automatic stabilization would be essential, so he decided to adapt his naval gyro-stabilizers (which he had developed for destroyers).

In 1913, the Navy provided a flying boat to test and evaluate the gyro-based autopilot. Sperry's son Lawrence served as an engineer during the test phase. In 1914, Lawrence Sperry was in Europe and observed the developing techniques of aerial warfare, including the use of aircraft. In 1915, the New-York Tribune broke the news of the project. In 1916, the two Sperrys joined Peter Hewitt, an early inventor of radio-related devices, to develop an explosive-laden pilotless airplane.

Elmer Sperry and Hewitt served together on the Naval Consulting Board, where they both were members of the Committee on Aeronautics and Aeronautical Motors. Because of these connections, they were able to arrange for a representative of the Navy's Bureau of Ordnance, Lt. T. S. Wilkinson, to examine the control equipment they assembled. The system consisted of a gyroscopic stabilizer, a directive gyroscope, an aneroid barometer to regulate height, servo-motors for control of rudders and ailerons, and a device for distance gearing. These all could be installed in an airplane which could be catapulted or flown from the water, and would climb to a predetermined altitude, fly a pre-set course, and after traveling a pre-set distance, drop its bombs or dive to the ground. Wilkinson reported that the weapon did not possess a degree of accuracy sufficient to hit a ship, but, because of its range of 50 to 100 miles (80 to 161 km), it might be of interest to the Army.

== Construction ==
However, after the US declaration of war on Germany, Sperry began urging the Navy to revisit the idea. The Naval Consulting Board supported him, and formally requested the Secretary of Navy to apportion $50,000 for the work. The government thus included the development of the flying bomb or aerial torpedo in its war preparations. The Senate went so far as to establish two classes for the type weapon, one for wireless control, the other for completely automatic operation. Final approval came on May 17, 1917, and the Navy agreed to provide five (later upped to seven) Curtiss N-9 seaplanes and to purchase six sets of the Sperry automatic control gear. Navy Secretary Josephus Daniels agreed to spend $200,000 on the project, with the money to be administered by the Bureau of Ordnance, the Bureau of Construction and Repair and the Bureau of Engineering. The operation was established at Copiague, Long Island.

The autopilot equipment was already designed, but the radio control system hadn't been fully developed, so while the hangars were being built at Copiague, Sperry turned his attention to this aspect, purchasing rights to a number of patented radio-related inventions. Ultimately, though, the radio control systems were not used on the Hewitt-Sperry Automatic Airplane. Later, in 1922, the system was installed on several Verville-designed planes along with gear for the Army Air Services engineering division. These aircraft successfully hit their targets from ranges of 30, 60 and 90 miles (140 km).

== Flight test ==
The first test flights of an autopilot-equipped aircraft was in September 1917 and took place with a human pilot on board to fly the takeoff. By November, the system successfully flew the aircraft to its intended target at a 30-mile (48 km) range, where the distance-measuring gear would drop a bag of sand. Accuracy was within two miles (3.2 km) of target.

Having observed the test flights, Rear Admiral Ralph Earle proposed a program to eliminate the German U-boat threat, one element of which was to use flying bombs, launched from Navy ships, to attack the submarine bases at Wilhelmshaven, Cuxhaven and Heligoland. Ultimately this plan was rejected, but had an element of prophecy, for in September 1944, during World War II, a modified B-24 flying as a drone attacked the submarine installations at Heligoland. Not only was Earle's recommendation rejected, but the Navy declared that though development of the system was to continue, no production resources were to be diverted to it, and it was not to go into production.

== Curtiss–Sperry Flying Bomb ==
When the N-9 flight test program got started, it became apparent that a more efficient airframe was needed. Because war production deliveries could not be diverted, a special, rush order was placed with Curtiss in October 1917 for six planes of unique design, with an empty weight of 500 lb (230 kg), top speed of 90 mph (140 km/h), range of 50 mi (80 km) and the capability of carrying up to 1,000 lb (450 kg) of explosives. They became known as the Curtiss–Sperry Flying Bomb. Because this was to be a design dedicated to the remote control concept, the planes were not equipped with seats or standard pilot controls. No flight or wind-tunnel testing of the design was performed before production began. The first was delivered on November 10.

One of the most daunting challenges to the designers was the launch mechanism. The original concept envisioned by Hewitt and Sperry was a catapult mechanism or from the water (the N-9s were seaplanes, the Flying Bomb was not). For the Flying Bomb, it was decided to try to launch it by sliding it down a long wire. In November and December 1917, three attempts were made to launch the Flying Bomb. On the first launch, one wing was damaged as the plane went down the wire, and on the second, the plane lifted from the wire but immediately plunged to the ground. The wire method was then abandoned in favor of a traditional catapult with a 150 ft (46 m) track, with power obtained from a 3-ton weight being dropped from a height of 30 ft (9.1 m). On the third try, the plane lagged behind the cart, damaging the propeller, and the plane flipped over its nose. Two more attempts in January, 1918, saw the plane get airborne, but it was too tail-heavy, so it stalled and crashed almost immediately.

It was realized that some flight test evaluation of the aircraft's capabilities was necessary. One of the planes was then fitted out with sled runners for landing gear, a seat and standard control stick, and Lawrence Sperry decided that he would be the test pilot. While taxiing it on ice, he hit some slushy snow, and wrecked the plane, though Sperry was unhurt. A second airplane was fitted out, and Sperry managed to get it in the air, but lost control when the automatic pilot was engaged. After two complete rolls, Sperry managed to regain control and land safely.

Clearly, though, more attention to flight testing the basic design was needed, particularly in the area of handling qualities. Sperry and his assistant, N. W. Dalton, obtained a Marmon automobile, and mounted the Curtiss–Sperry Flying Bomb to the top of it. In this configuration, Sperry and his crew drove the Long Island Motor Parkway at 80 mph (130 km/h), one of the first examples of an open-air wind tunnel, and adjusted the flight controls to what they thought was the optimum settings. The design of the fuselage was changed slightly, lengthening it by two feet.

The Marmon was not only an excellent way to adjust the flight controls, it was realized that it would also be a good launching platform, and this was tried on March 6, 1918. The aircraft left the car cleanly, and flew in stable flight for the 1,000 yards (910 m) that the distance-measuring gear had been set for. For the first time in history, an unmanned, heavier-than-air vehicle had flown in controlled flight.

The feat, however, could not be duplicated, and it was thought that the roadway was too rough. The Marmon was fitted with railroad wheels, and an unused spur of the Long Island Rail Road, four miles (6.4 km) east of Farmingdale, New York was put back into service. On the first try, before full flying speed had been reached, the aircraft developed enough lift to raise the front wheels off the track, and another crash resulted. It was time to re-think the catapult system, and to help design it, Sperry and Hewitt hired a young and promising engineer named Carl Norden. The first try with the new system was in August 1918, and it too resulted in a crash. Two more tests were tried, with the stabilization package that had been design for the Flying Bomb replaced with the four-gyro system used earlier on the N-9 tests, but the result was again a disappointment, with very short flights ending in crashes. On the last one, on September 26, the Flying Bomb climbed straight for about a hundred yards, then entered a spiral dive and crashed. This was the final flight for the Curtiss–Sperry Flying Bomb, as all the usable airframes had been consumed in crashes, and there remained no confidence in the design. Sperry and Hewitt returned to the N-9.

== Return of the N-9 ==
The Sperrys built a wind tunnel at the Washington Navy Yard and carried out a series of tests on the N-9, fine tuning the design. On October 17, an unmanned N-9 was launched using the new Norden catapult system. It came cleanly off the track, climbed steadily and flew within 2° of the line of intended flight. The distance gear had been set for a flight of eight miles (13 km), but somehow malfunctioned. When last seen, the N-9 was cruising over Bayshore Air Station at about 4,000 ft (1,200 m), heading east. It was never seen again.

Despite the success of the stabilization gear, there was doubt in the Navy about the program, and they asked Carl Norden to review the Sperry components and recommend improvement. The navy was, by now, satisfied with the concept, and was contemplating purchasing such equipment on its own, apart from the Sperrys. Elmer Sperry tried to stir up enthusiasm again, calling the concept of the flying bomb the "gun of the future". This was to no avail, however. World War I came to a close when the Armistice was signed on November 11, 1918. Almost a hundred flights had been flown in the N-9, but almost all of these were in the N-9s and had a safety pilot on board. The Navy took complete control of the program from Sperry, spelling the end of the Hewitt-Sperry Automatic Airplane.

== Successors ==
During the early post-war years, the Navy sponsored similar projects. For the first program, Witteman-Lewis aircraft and Norden-designed gyrostabilizers were used, but the results were no better than those achieved by the Sperrys. In 1921, the program was reoriented to focus on the radio control aspect. The control equipment was developed at the radio laboratory at NAS Anacostia (later the Naval Research Laboratory). In 1923, tests began and were relatively successful, but interest waned, and the project lapsed in 1925. Over a decade was to pass before the Navy seriously undertook the development of target drones and pilotless aircraft.

== See also ==
- Kettering Bug
- British unmanned aerial vehicles of World War I
- Larynx (unmanned aircraft)
- V-1 flying bomb
