= Waco 6 =

Biplane

The Waco 6, designed by the Advance Aircraft Company, was a 2-seat biplane similar to the Curtiss JN-4, with single bay equi-span wings. The fuselage was built from wood, fabric covered, with tandem cockpits, the forward one between the mainplanes. Four aircraft were built ca. 1923.

== Specifications ==
Data from

General characteristics

- Crew: 2
- Capacity: 750 lb (340 kg)
- Length: 24 ft (7.3 m)
- Wingspan: 30 ft (9.1 m)
- Powerplant: 1 × Curtiss OX-5 V-8 water-cooled piston engine, 90 hp (67 kW)

Performance

- Maximum speed: 88 mph (142 km/h, 76 kn)
- Stall speed: 32 mph (51 km/h, 28 kn)
- Service ceiling: 19,000 ft (5,800 m) as advertised!!
