= "WE" (1927 book) =

Autobiography of Charles A. Lindbergh

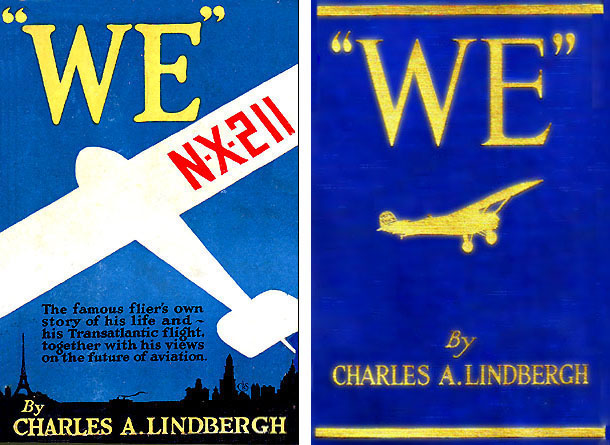
- Dustjacket and cover (1927 first edition)
- Author: Charles A. Lindbergh; Fitzhugh Green (appendix)
- Language: English
- Genre: Autobiography
- Publisher: G. P. Putnam's Sons
- Publication date: July 27, 1927
- Publication place: United States
- Pages: 318

"WE" is an autobiographical account by Charles A. Lindbergh (1902–1974) about his life and the events leading up to and including his May 1927 New York to Paris solo trans-Atlantic flight in the Spirit of St. Louis, a custom-built, single engine, single-seat Ryan monoplane (Registration: N-X-211). It was first published on July 27, 1927, by G.P. Putnam's Sons in New York.

== Production and summary ==
Just 57 days after then-25-year-old former US Air Mail pilot Charles Lindbergh had completed his historic Orteig Prize-winning first-ever non-stop solo transatlantic flight from New York (Roosevelt Field) to Paris (Le Bourget) on May 20–21, 1927, in the single-engine Ryan monoplane Spirit of St. Louis, "WE", the first of what would eventually be 15 books Lindbergh would either author or significantly contribute to, was released on July 27, 1927. The 318-page illustrated volume was published by G.P. Putnam's Sons (The Knickerbocker Press), the New York publishing house run by prominent promoter and aviation enthusiast George P. Putnam (1887–1950) who later promoted the career (and eventually married) another equally famous flyer of the era, the ill-fated American aviator Amelia Earhart. The suddenly world-famous young aviator noted on the book's dust jacket cover that he wrote it himself to provide the public with his "own story of his life and his transatlantic flight together with his views on the future of aviation". As such Lindbergh's virtually "instant" autobiography proved to be an immediate bestseller and remained so for over a year.

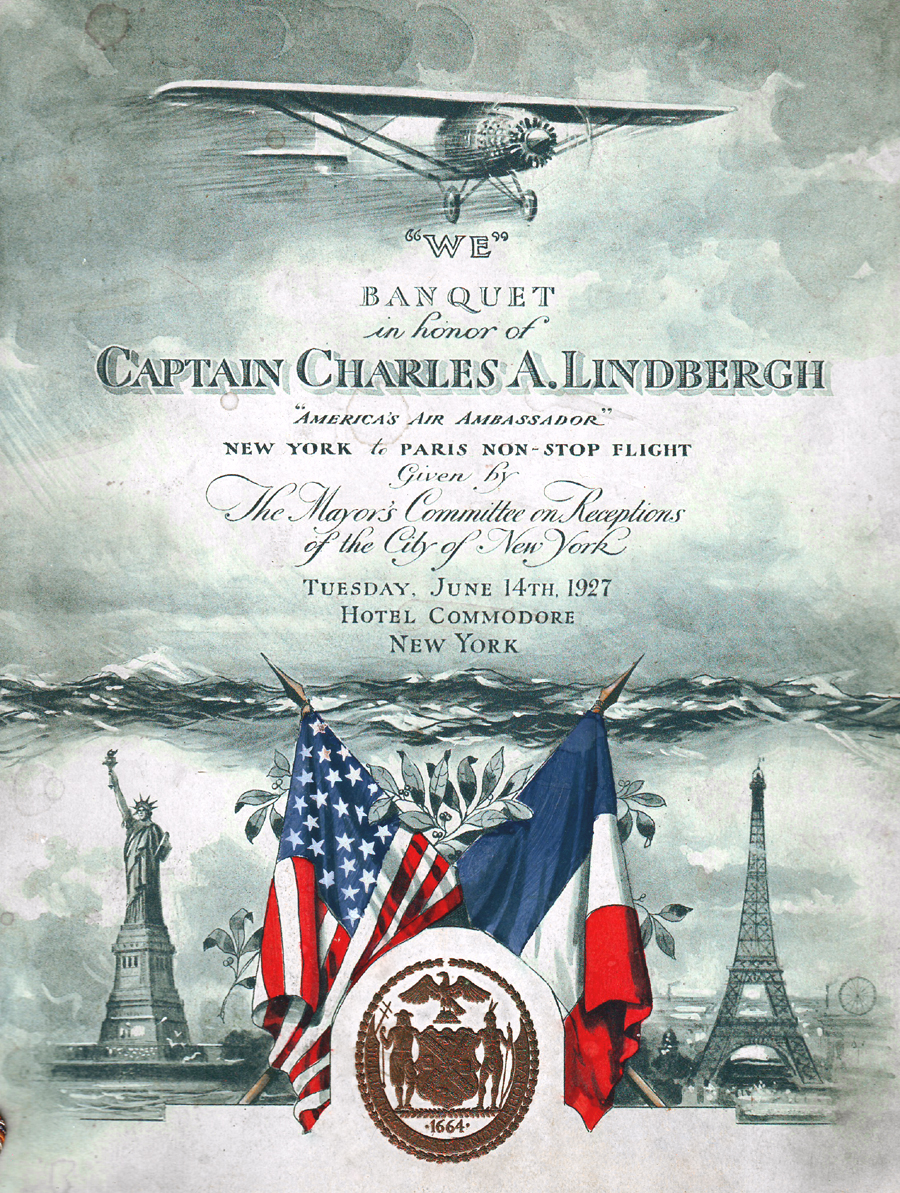
The New York City "WE" Banquet (June 14, 1927)

Both the dust jacket notes of the first edition as well as the frontispiece illustration reveal that the book's simple, one-word "flying pronoun" title "WE" was meant to refer to a "spiritual" partnership between Lindbergh and his airplane developed "through the dark hours of his flight". However Putnam's had selected the title without its author's knowledge or approval, and Lindbergh would later often complain about that interpretation of its meaning as being incorrect. Instead he said that "we" referred to himself and his financial backers in St. Louis, not his airplane, as the press had people believing, although his frequent unconscious use of the phrase referring to himself and the Spirit seemed to suggest otherwise. (Note: Dustjacket endpaper note, "WE" G.P. Putnam's, First Edition, July 27, 1927: IN this publisher's safe reposes a remarkable and valuable manuscript. Every word of it has been painstakingly written in longhand. Every word of it is precious, not only because it goes into the telling of a great story, but because it clothes so simply and modestly the spirit of Charles A. Lindbergh. This manuscript — Lindbergh's own story—is herewith printed unaltered and unadorned. It is the real story of "WE" by the articulate member of that famous partnership. It goes back in its recital to long before May 20, 1927, when a slim youth stood silhouetted beside his plane against the dawn, calmly awaiting the supreme test in his young life. It goes back to Lindbergh's description of his boyhood and early flights. It tells how he got his first plane. It describes vividly and in detail his unique career as a stunt flier; his training days in the Army Air Corps; his four emergency parachute jumps which saved his life as an Air Mail pilot. It includes his views of the future of aviation. Then come the stirring events leading up to the flight which has made history; the flight itself; and finally Lindbergh's gracious acknowledgment of the amazing receptions accorded him in Europe and America. There follows a chronicle of the honors and ceremonies, the wild welcomes and the kaleidoscopic travels of the flier from the moment he reached Paris until he reached St. Louis after his return. The publishers knew the editorial "we" as a business byword; but it was not until Lindbergh landed in Paris that they heard of the aeronautical "we." This new and fitting "flying pronoun" at once struck fire as the proper title for the book. Further, it is this "we" and the deep spiritual meaning with it that give an added significance and emphasis to the divine guidance which must have been the pilot's through the dark hours of his flight.)

While Lindbergh had been busy being continuously feted in Washington, New York, St. Louis and elsewhere over the first couple of weeks after his return to the United States on June 10, a first manuscript for the book was quickly ghostwritten by New York Times reporter J. Carlisle MacDonald who had interviewed Lindbergh extensively in both Paris and during the six-day crossing of the Atlantic from Cherbourg to Washington on board the US Navy cruiser USS Memphis and had been holed up with a staff of secretaries in publisher George Putnam's house in Rye, New York. MacDonald had earlier ghostwritten from Paris a pair of "first person" accounts of the flight that had appeared under Lindbergh's name on the front page of the paper on May 23 and 24, two and three days after the flight.

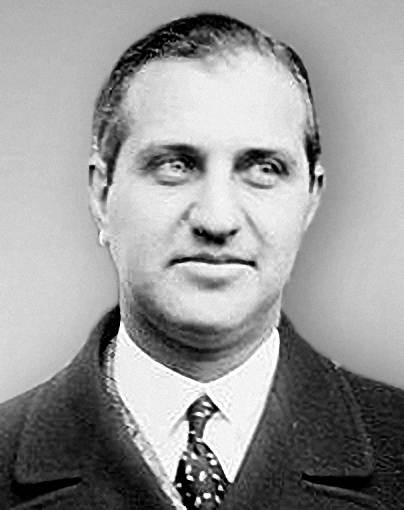
Aviation promoter Harry Guggenheim both assisted Lindbergh to complete "WE" and sponsored its book tour

The fastest book produced up to that time, a complete set of galley proofs of MacDonald's manuscript was ready for Lindbergh's approval within two weeks of his return to America. However, as with MacDonald's two original ghostwritten Times stories which the meticulous Army-trained aviator had disapproved of as not only being rife with factual errors, but having been "cheaply done" and written in a "false, fawning" tone, Lindbergh rejected the ghostwritten book manuscript as well for similar reasons, i.e., MacDonald had written the book in the first person and had reverted to the bombast Lindbergh thought they had abandoned back in Paris. (Note: Said Lindbergh more than forty years later of MacDonald's "smarmy, aw-shucks style, poor imitation of Will Rogers" accounts: "I was shocked and disappointed. It was neither accurate nor in accord with my character and viewpoint. It made me into quite a different fellow than I was or wanted to be, and it gave quite a distorted picture of the flight itself.") Lindbergh knew, however, that he could not renege on his contract with Putnam's that had already begun to publicize the book promising copies by July 1. When Fitzhugh Green, the book's editor at Putnam's, told him that "it is your book, we wouldn't want to publish it if it weren't", Lindbergh undertook to completely rewrite it himself "painstakingly in longhand" using MacDonald's manuscript as a template. Lindbergh accomplished that daunting task in less than three weeks working in solitude while a guest of businessman, philanthropist, and aviation promoter Harry Frank Guggenheim at Falaise, his sprawling waterfront mansion at Sands Point, Long Island.

"The noted young aviator has excited real admiration in the way he refuses to hurry publication of his story," the Times noted in reporting the unexpected delay in the publication of the book. "Had he been willing to dash off a careless job, he might have taken advantage of his wonderful notoriety and made a lot of money quickly. Instead, he insists that the book shall be the most accurate and perfect account of his life, his transatlantic flight and his experience after he reached Paris, that he can possibly put together. When his publisher urged him to hurry, his response was a new mass of hand-written manuscript so clear and so precise that the publishers felt reproved for their importunity." Lindbergh worked most of every day "writing in blue ink with a fountain pen on plain eight-by-ten-inch white bond in his largest, most readable script", counting his output by running the total at the top of each page to assure meeting his contract to produce at least 40,000 words. In less than three weeks Lindbergh delivered the last of his pages to Fitzhugh Green at just under the agreed length.

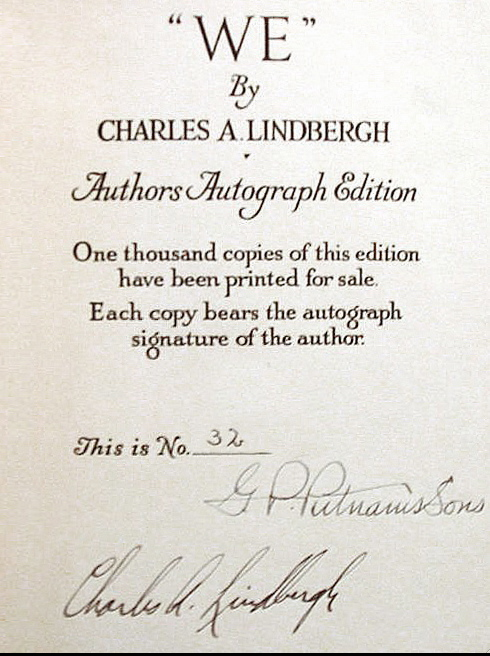
Limited first edition author's autograph page

"WE" was officially published little more than a week later on July 27 and within six weeks it had sold over 190,000 copies at $2.50 apiece while a special limited edition of 1,000 numbered autographed copies also sold out quickly at $25 each. Soon translated into most major world languages, "WE" remained at the top of best-seller lists well into 1928. With dozens of printings and more than 650,000 copies sold in the first year, "WE" earned Lindbergh more than $250,000 in royalties. The book's great commercial success was considerably aided by its publication coinciding with the start of his three-month tour of the United States in the Spirit on behalf of the Daniel Guggenheim Fund for the Promotion of Aeronautics. The nation became obsessed with Lindbergh during the tour in which he was seen in person by more than 30 million Americans, a quarter of the nation's then population. No other author before or since ever had such an extensive, highly publicized tour that helped promote a book than did Lindbergh's "We" of himself and the Spirit during their 22,350-mile, July 20 to October 23, 1927, tour of the U.S., visiting 82 cities in all 48 states during which the nation's nascent aviation superhero delivered 147 speeches and rode 1,290 mi (2,080 km) in parades. (Note: The cities in which Lindbergh and the Spirit of St. Louis landed during the Guggenheim Fund-sponsored book tour for "WE": New York, NY; Hartford, CT; Providence, RI; Boston, MA; Concord, NH; Orchard Beach & Portland, ME; Springfield, VT; Albany, Schenectady, Syracuse, Rochester, & Buffalo, NY; Cleveland, OH; Pittsburgh, PA; Wheeling, WV; Dayton & Cincinnati, OH; Louisville, KY; Indianapolis, IN; Detroit & Grand Rapids, MI; Chicago & Springfield, IL; St. Louis & Kansas City, MO; Wichita, KS; St. Joseph, MO; Moline, IL; Milwaukee & Madison, WI; Minneapolis/St. Paul & Little Falls, MN; Fargo, ND; Sioux Falls, SD; Des Moines, IA; Omaha, NE; Denver, CO; Pierre, SD; Cheyenne, WY; Salt Lake City, UT; Boise, ID; Butte & Helena, MT; Spokane & Seattle, WA; Portland, OR; San Francisco, Oakland, & Sacramento, CA; Reno, NV; Los Angeles & San Diego, CA; Tucson, AZ; Lordsburg, NM; El Paso, TX; Santa Fe, NM; Abilene, Fort Worth & Dallas, TX; Oklahoma City, Tulsa & Mukkogee, OK; Little Rock, AR; Memphis & Chattanooga, TN; Birmingham, AL; Jackson, MS; New Orleans, LA; Jacksonville, FL; Spartensburg, SC; Greensboro & Winston-Salen, NC; Richmond, VA; Washington, D.C.; Baltimore, MD; Atlantic City, NJ; Wilmington, DE; Philadelphia, PA; New York, NY.)

US Ambassador to France Myron T. Herrick, Lindbergh's host in Paris, contributed an impassioned foreword to "WE". "Flying was his trade, his means of livelihood," Herrick wrote. "But the love of it burned in him with fine passion, and now that his fame will give him a wider scope of usefulness, he has announced that he will devote himself wholeheartedly to the advancement of aeronautics. His first step in that direction is the publishing of this book and no one can doubt that its influence will be of enormous value in pushing on man's conquest of the air. It will be idle for me or any one else to estimate now what these results will be. But America vibrates with glowing pride at the thought that out from our country has come this fresh spirit of the air and that the whole world hails Lindbergh not only as a brave aviator but as an example of American idealism, character and conduct." In addition to Herrick's foreword, also included as an appendix is an 85-page essay by editor Green entitled A Little of what the World thought of Lindbergh describing the post-flight welcomes in Paris, Brussels, London, Washington, New York and St. Louis. (Note: Author's Note: "I have asked Fitzhugh Green to write a brief account of my various receptions not only because I think he has caught the spirit of what I have tried to do for aviation, but because I trust his judgement in selection of material." Charles A. Lindbergh (facsimile autograph), "WE", p. 232) While the precipitating event for the publication of "WE" was the solo non-stop flight from New York to Paris, Lindbergh's account of this takes up only 18 pages (pp. 213–230) in the book which is mostly about his life before May 20, 1927. It would not be until Lindbergh wrote his Pulitzer Prize-winning The Spirit of St. Louis a quarter-of-a-century later in 1953 that he provided a first-hand book-length account of the flight itself.

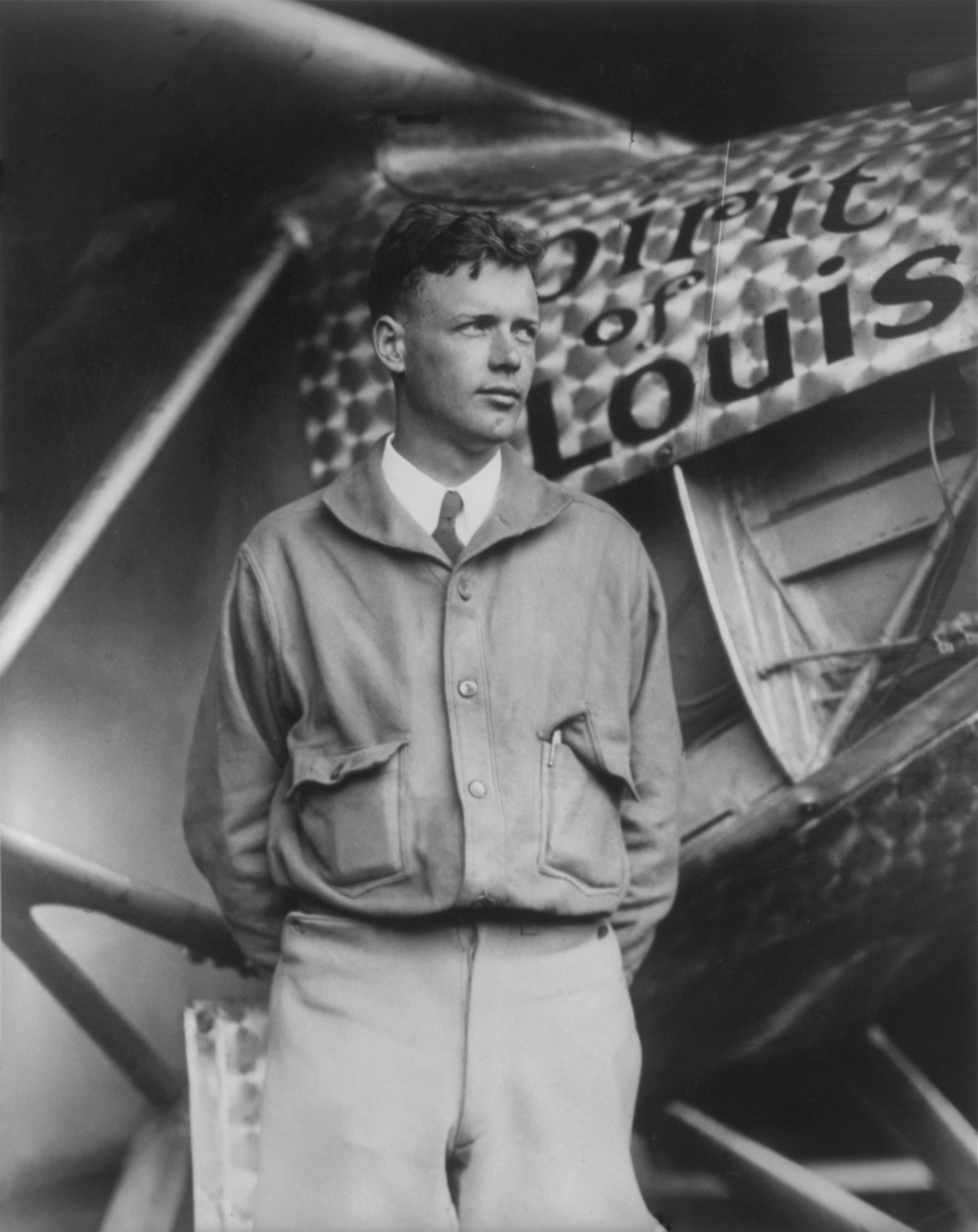
"WE": Lindbergh and the Spirit of St. Louis in 1927

Reviews for the book were generally positive although expressed disappointment that so little of the text provided an account of the preparation for and the flight to Paris itself. "Now that Lindbergh has spoken, we inquisitors are apt to be disappointed, at least upon superficial reading of his story," noted Horace Green in his review of "WE" in the New York Times in which he nonetheless applauded Lindbergh's meticulous attention to detail. "Where is the 'inside' story that 50,000 advance buyers of the volume have been led to expect? There is none. And on second thought it is apparent that if the recital was to be in any degree a real Lindbergh product there could be no inside story. The young flying Colonel, as his friends know, has no Imagination in the personal sense, but great Imagination in the mechanical sense. His mind works without embroidery. He thinks and speaks in condensed terms suitable to his purpose. One is grateful to say that the delay in publication of the long heralded "WE" whether brought about by Lindbergh's refusal to be stampeded or by the counsel of other heads, has permitted Lindbergh to tell his own story without the interpolations, as they are known in the editorial world, of too many ghosts."

== Quotation ==
Lindbergh noted in "WE" that his year of US Army flight training (1924–25) was the key factor in his development as both a focused, goal-oriented individual, and as a skillful and resourceful aviator capable of making his remarkable transatlantic flight just two years later.

"Always there was some new experience, always something interesting going on to make the time spent at Brooks and Kelly one of the banner years in a pilot's life," Lindbergh noted. "The training is difficult and rigid, but there is none better. A cadet must be willing to forget all other interest in life when he enters the Texas flying schools and he must enter with the intention of devoting every effort and all of the energy during the next 12 months towards a single goal. But when he receives the wings at Kelly a year later, he has the satisfaction of knowing that he has graduated from one of the world's finest flying schools."
