= Norman Thompson N.T.2B =

British single-engined flying boat trainer

N.T.2B
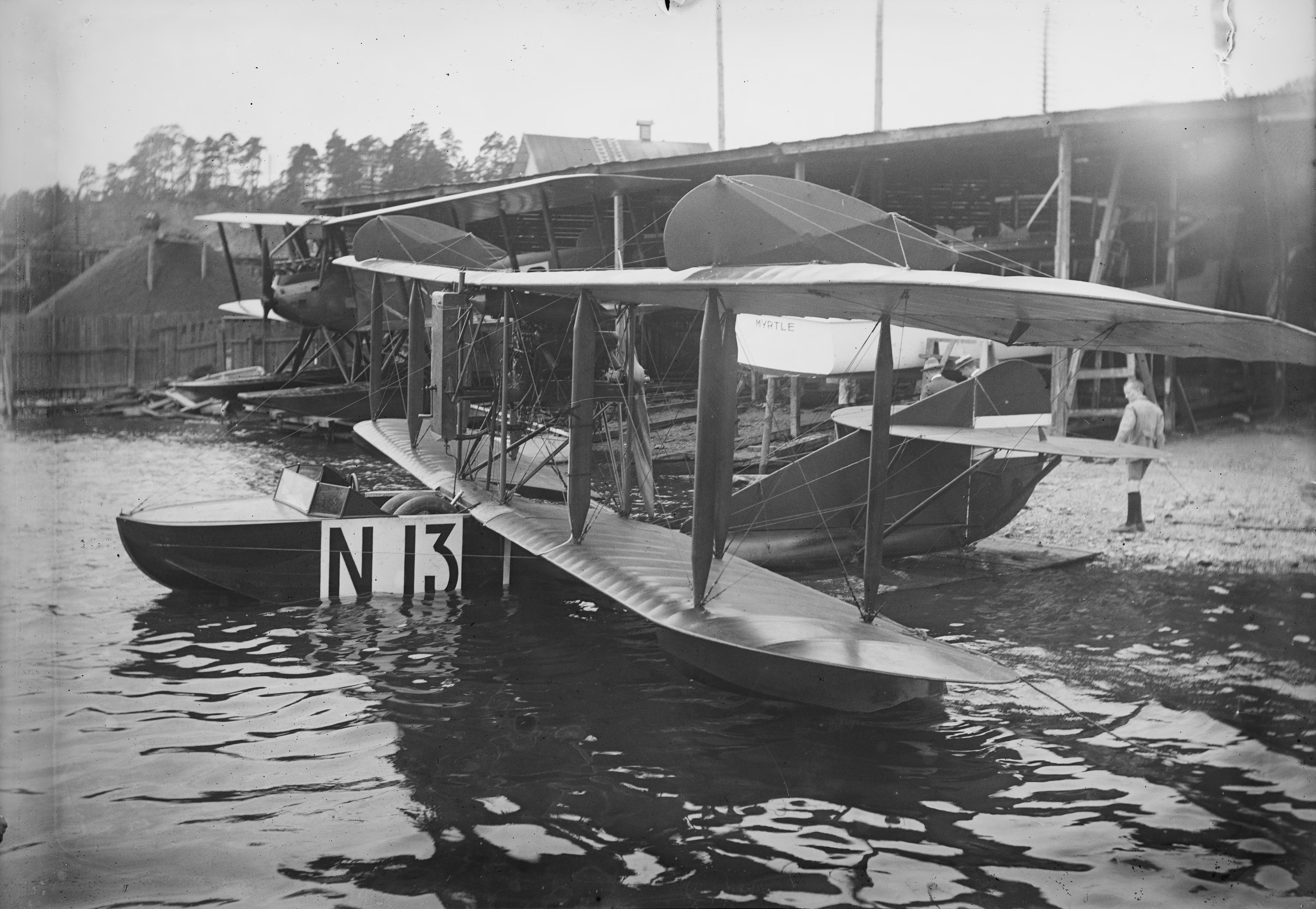
- Norwegian N.T.2B with semi-enclosed cockpit at Oslo.

General information
- Type: Flying boat trainer
- Manufacturer: Norman Thompson Flight Company
- Designer: Francis Percy Beadle
- Primary user: Royal Naval Air Service

History
- First flight: 1917
- Developed from: White and Thompson No. 3

The Norman Thompson N.T.2B was a British single-engined flying boat trainer of the First World War. A single-engined biplane, the N.T.2B was adopted as a standard flying boat trainer by the Royal Naval Air Service, training pilots for larger patrol flying boats such as the Felixstowe F.2.

== Development and design ==
In late 1916, the Norman Thompson Flight Company, who had previously built 20 FBA Type B flying boat trainers, proposed to design and build a new trainer for pilots needed for large patrol flying boats such as the Curtiss Americas, Felixstowe F.2, and Norman Thompson's own N.T.4. The British Admiralty accepted the Norman Thompson proposal, and placed an order for 10 aircraft in November 1916 for the Royal Naval Air Service (RNAS).

The resulting aircraft, designated N.T.2B, was a single-engined pusher biplane, with unequal span two-bay wings and powered by a 160 hp (119 kW) Beardmore 160 hp engine mounted between the wings driving a four-bladed propeller. The trainee pilot and instructor sat side by side in an enclosed cockpit, fitted with dual controls.

While initial production was powered by the Beardmore, or by 150 hp (112 kW) Hispano-Suiza engines, later aircraft were fitted with a 200 hp (149 kW) Sunbeam Arab, which was mounted slightly to starboard of the centreline of the aircraft to overcome the greater torque of the more powerful engine. The Arab, however, proved unreliable, and the powerplant was changed again, to the 200 hp (149 kW) Hispano-Suiza 8 engine, which was mounted at an angle to overcome a similar torque problem as was observed with the Arab.

The RNAS's (and after 1 April 1918, the Royal Air Force's) needs for the N.T.2B were beyond the capacity of Norman Thompson, so orders were placed with Supermarine and S. E. Saunders, as well as with the parent company.^{[a]} At least 294 had been ordered by the end of the First World War, which brought about large scale cancellations.^{[b]}

== Operational history ==
The first N.T.2B was delivered to the RNAS flying school at Calshot on 8 July 1917, the type becoming the standard training flying boat of the RNAS and RAF until the end of the First World War, although delivery delays caused by the engine problems caused a backlog in training flying boat pilots. Seventy-nine were on charge with the RAF on 31 October 1918. It operated at bases at Felixstowe and Lee-on-Solent as well as Calshot.

Following the end of the war, N.T.2Bs were sold to the air forces of Estonia, Peru and Norway. Civil N.T.2Bs were flown in Norway and Canada, where one aircraft remained in use for forestry patrols until 1929.

== Operators ==
Canada

- Royal Canadian Air Force

Estonia

- Estonian Air Force - 2 aircraft

Japan

- Imperial Japanese Navy

Norway

- Royal Norwegian Air Force

Peru

- Peruvian Air Force - 2 Handley Page Ltd aircraft sent in 1919

United Kingdom

- Royal Naval Air Service
- Royal Air Force

== Specifications (N.T.2B - Arab engine) ==
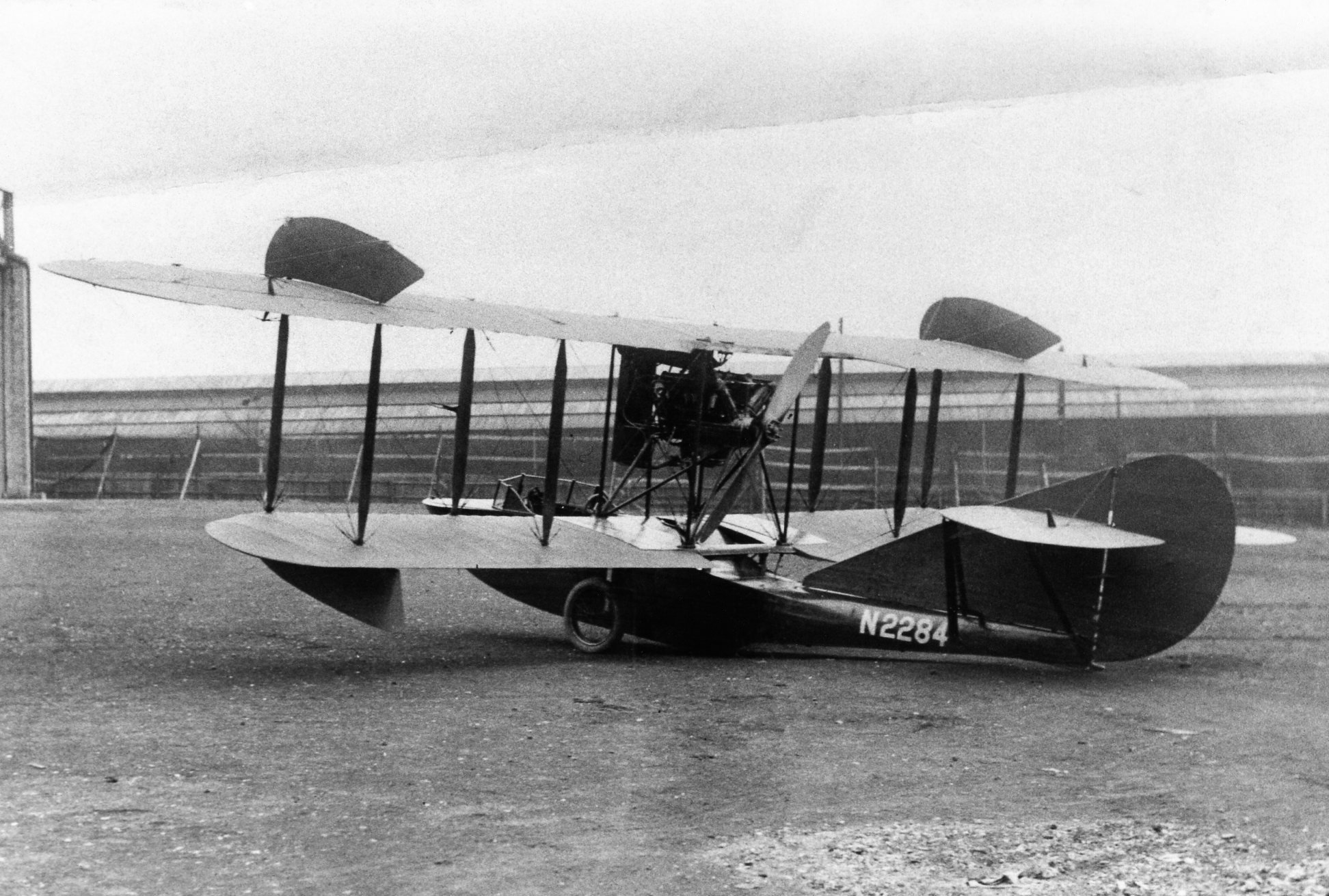
Rear left quarter view.

Data from British Aeroplanes 1914-18

General characteristics

- Crew: 2
- Length: 27 ft 4.5 in (8.344 m)
- Wingspan: 48 ft 4.75 in (14.7511 m)
- Height: 10 ft 8 in (3.25 m)
- Wing area: 453 sq ft (42.1 m^{2})
- Empty weight: 2,321 lb (1,053 kg)
- Gross weight: 3,169 lb (1,437 kg)
- Powerplant: 1 × Sunbeam Arab V-8 water-cooled piston engine, 200 hp (150 kW)
- Propellers: 4-bladed fixed-pitch pusher propeller

Performance

- Maximum speed: 85 mph (137 km/h, 74 kn) at 2,000 ft (610 m)
- Service ceiling: 11,400 ft (3,500 m)
- Time to altitude: 10,000 ft (3,048 m) 33 minutes 40 seconds
- Wing loading: 7 lb/sq ft (34 kg/m^{2})
- Power/mass: 0.063 hp/lb (0.104 kW/kg)

== See also ==
Related development

- White and Thompson No. 3

Aircraft of comparable role, configuration, and era

- Curtiss Model F
- FBA Type A

Related lists

- List of flying boats and floatplanes
- List of aircraft of the Royal Naval Air Service

== Notes ==
- ^{a} The Norman Thompson Flight Company had gone into receivership in 1918, after delays in placing orders for new aircraft. Production continued at Norman Thompson's (and orders continued to be placed) despite this. Norman Thompson Flight Company became part of Handley Page in 1919.
- ^{b} Estimates of the number of aircraft produced vary, with London giving production of 107–121, and Bruce estimating at least 150 built.
