= White & Thompson No. 1 Seaplane =

British built twin-engined biplane flying boat

No. 1 Seaplane
- Circuit of Britain No.1 Seaplane, summer 1914.

General information
- Type: Flying boat
- National origin: United Kingdom
- Manufacturer: White & Thompson
- Designer: Norman Thompson
- Status: Prototype
- Number built: 1

History
- First flight: October 1914

The White & Thompson No. 1 Seaplane (also No. 1 Flying boat) was the first British built twin-engined biplane flying boat, assembled just prior to the outbreak of the First World War to compete in an air-race around the UK. It was unsuccessful, only the single prototype being built.

== Design and development ==
In 1914, the White and Thompson Company Limited, of Bognor Regis, England, who had become exclusive licence holders for Curtiss flying boats for Great Britain the previous year, decided to build two different flying boats, designed by Norman Thompson, co-owner and the driving force behind White & Thompson, to compete in the Daily Mail £5,000 Circuit of Britain race for seaplanes, scheduled to start on 10 August that year. Thompson's designs were a single-engined flying boat, similar to the Curtiss Model F flying boat which Thompson had a licence for, and a larger twin-engined aircraft.

The twin-engined aircraft, the White & Thompson No. 1 Seaplane, was a biplane powered by two pusher Curtiss OX water-cooled V-8 engines driving three-bladed propellers with adjustable pitch. It was of wooden construction, with the fuselage built of elm and spruce planked with mahogany. The crew of two sat side-by side in a cockpit fitted with dual-controls just ahead of the wings. Its tail assembly had a large fin which was supplemented by two auxiliary fins mounted on the upper wing, and a high mounted horizontal tail.

== Operational history ==
Circuit of Britain, No.2 Seaplane, summer 1914, Norman Thompson standing alongside.

Although started later, the single-engined aircraft, the No. 2 Seaplane, flew first on 1 August 1914. The No. 1 was still not ready when the Circuit of Britain race was cancelled on 4 August due to the outbreak of World War I. Initial attempts in September 1914 to fly the No. 1 proved unsuccessful, it proving unable to leave the water. After a great deal of modification, supervised by White & Thompson's new chief designer, Percy Beadle, culminating in the fitting of horizontal planing fins to the hull, for the aircraft to finally able to make its maiden flight during October.

Although the No. 1 was impressed by the Royal Naval Air Service, it was never delivered, being retained by White & Thompson for testing, and indeed it is possible that it never flew again following its maiden flight.

== Specifications ==

Data from The Norman Thompson File

General characteristics

- Crew: 2
- Length: 32 ft 3 in (9.83 m)
- Upper wingspan: 52 ft 0 in (15.85 m)
- Lower wingspan: 40 ft 0 in (12.19 m)
- Height: 10 ft 6 in (3.20 m) (approx)
- Wing area: 500 sq ft (46 m^{2})
- Airfoil: RAF 6
- Empty weight: 2,000 lb (907 kg)
- Gross weight: 3,000 lb (1,361 kg)
- Fuel capacity: 90 imp gallons (410 L)
- Powerplant: 2 × Curtiss OX water-cooled V-8 engine, 90 hp (67 kW) each

Performance

- Maximum speed: 78 mph (126 km/h, 68 kn)
- Endurance: 6 hr

== See also ==
Related development

- Curtiss Model F
- America flying boat

Aircraft of comparable role, configuration, and era

- Felixstowe F.1
