= Curtiss Model K =

American 1915 single engine flying boat

Model K
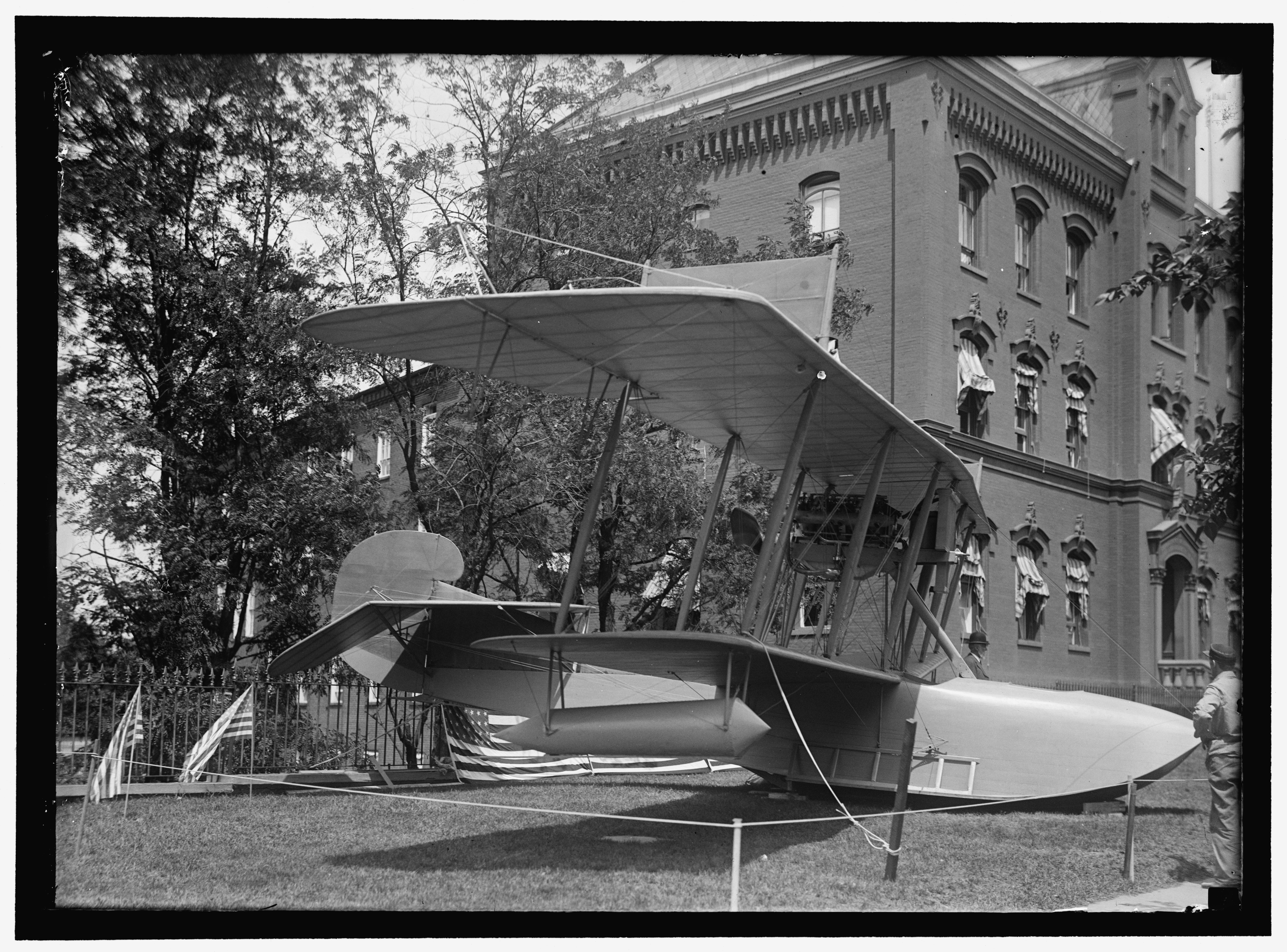

General information
- Type: Flying boat
- National origin: United States of America
- Manufacturer: Curtiss
- Primary user: Imperial Russian Navy
- Number built: at least 51

History
- First flight: January 1915
- Developed from: Curtiss Model F

The Curtiss Model K, also known as the Model 4, was an American single-engined flying boat of World War I. It was an enlarged derivative of Curtiss's Model F and about 50 were built for export to the Imperial Russian Navy.

== Design and development ==
In 1914, the Curtiss Aeroplane Company developed its Model K, an enlarged development of its successful Model F flying boat. It was a three-bay biplane powered by a 150 hp (112 kW) Curtiss V-X engine mounted in a pusher configuration between the wings. Unlike the Model F, its wings were staggered and slightly swept, while its ailerons were mounted on the upper wing instead of between the wings.

The first flight of the Model K was delayed by problems with its engine until January 1915, with it being claimed that the aircraft was the largest single-engined flying boat in the world at the time.

== Operational history ==
While the Model K did not attract orders from home, attempts to export it were more successful, resulting in an order for at least 51 aircraft in both flying boat and landplane versions from the Imperial Russian Navy in 1914. (Note: Johnson states that the order, for 54 aircraft was placed in late 1915, with deliveries starting in 1916.) The crated aircraft were shipped via Vancouver and Vladivostok, resulting in serious delays in the aircraft being reassembled, such that many of them were unseaworthy due to their hulls having cracked.

== Operators ==
Russian Empire

- Imperial Russian Navy

== Specifications ==
Data from Curtiss Aircraft 1907–1947

General characteristics

- Crew: three
- Length: 31 ft 5 in (9.58 m)
- Wingspan: 55 ft 10 in (17.01 m)
- Wing area: 592 sq ft (55.0 m^{2})
- Empty weight: 2,700 lb (1,225 kg)
- Gross weight: 3,900 lb (1,769 kg)
- Powerplant: 1 × Curtiss V-X , 150 hp (110 kW)

Performance

- Maximum speed: 70 mph (110 km/h, 61 kn)
- Range: 364 mi (586 km, 316 nmi)
- Rate of climb: 150 ft/min (0.76 m/s)
