= Curtiss C-1 Canada =

Twin-engined bomber aircraft of the First World War

C-1 Canada
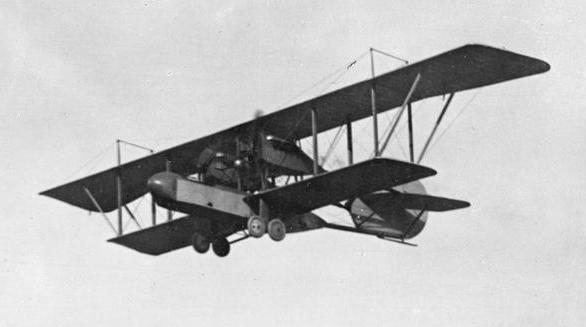

General information
- Type: Bomber aircraft
- National origin: United States/Canada
- Manufacturer: Curtiss
- Number built: 12

History
- First flight: 3 September 1915
- Developed from: Curtiss America

The Curtiss C-1 Canada was a twin-engined bomber aircraft of the First World War which was designed by Curtiss of America to be built by their Canadian subsidiary for the British Royal Naval Air Service and Royal Flying Corps. Although large orders were placed, only twelve were built, the type being rejected in favour of more capable aircraft such as the Handley Page O/100.

== Design and development ==
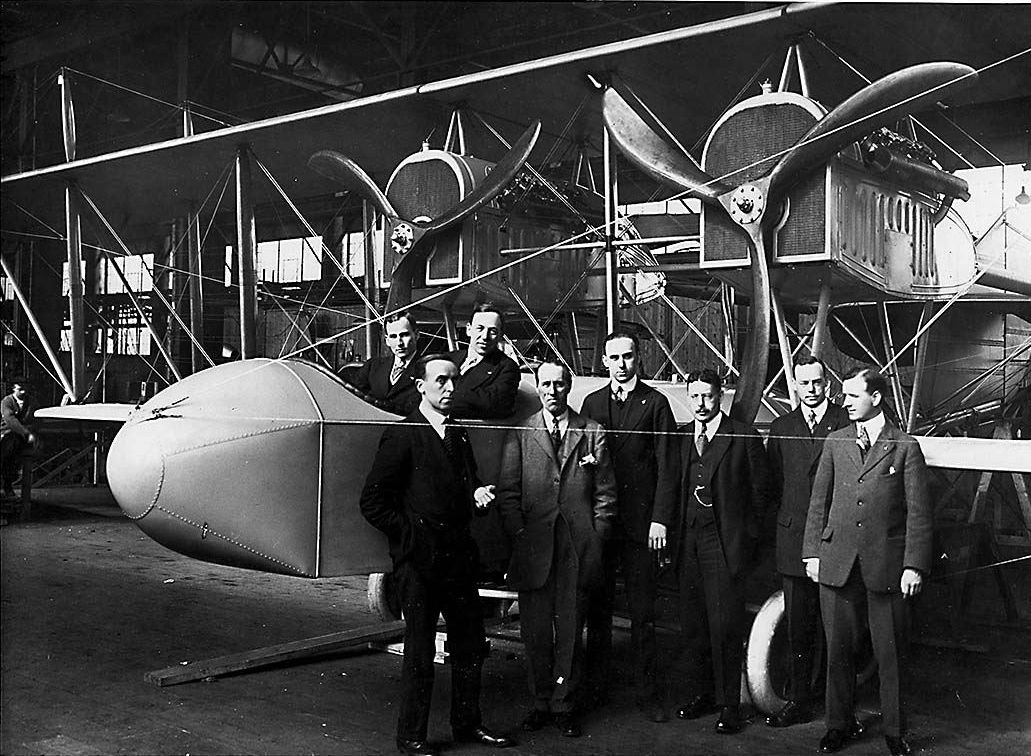
Curtiss C-1 Canada on completion in 1916

In 1915, Curtiss designed a twin-engined landplane bomber based on its Curtiss Model H flying boat that had been designed for an attempt to fly across the Atlantic Ocean non-stop, and was in production for Britains's Royal Naval Air Service (RNAS). The RNAS was interested in Curtiss's design, and placed an order for a single prototype. As Curtiss's Hammondsport and Buffalo, New York factories were busy building JN trainers and H-4 flying boats, it was decided to give responsibility for the new bomber, the C-1, to Curtiss's new Canadian subsidiary, Curtiss Aeroplane and Motors, Ltd. (later to become Canadian Aeroplanes Ltd. when taken over by the Canadian government), based at Toronto, giving rise to the name Curtiss Canada.

The Canada used the unequal span biplane wings and 160 hp (120 kW) Curtiss V-X engines of the H-4 flying boat, but the rest of the design was new. The fuselage was a long nacelle attached to the lower wing, with two gunners sitting side-by-side in an open cockpit in the nose of the nacelle, with the pilot sitting alone in a separate cockpit at the rear of the nacelle, behind the wings. The tail surfaces, with had a single vertical fin, were carried on twin tailbooms extending from the rear of the engine nacelles, with a third, lower, tailboom from the rear of the fuselage nacelle. It had a conventional landing gear with twin, tandem mainwheels and a tailskid. An early form of autopilot, the Sperry stabilizer, was fitted to improve stability for bombing.

Construction of the prototype started in May 1915, and was first flown on 3 September 1915, powered by two 90 hp (67 kW) Curtiss OX-5 engines as the planned V-Xs were unavailable. Further orders were placed for 100 production aircraft for the RNAS, and another prototype and ten production aircraft for the Royal Flying Corps.

== Operational history ==
The first Curtiss Canada was delivered by ship to Britain in late 1915, being reassembled at Farnborough for the RFC, flying again in January 1916. It was damaged in a crash in February, being rebuilt with modified wings. When tested in April, its performance proved to be poor. While the ten production aircraft for the RFC were delivered un-assembled to Farnborough by July that year, the RFC had abandoned the Canada, and these aircraft were never re-assembled. The RNAS received one prototype, cancelling its orders as the greatly superior Handley Page O/100 was coming into service.

== Specifications ==
Data from Curtiss Aircraft 1907–1948

General characteristics

- Crew: 3
- Length: 33 ft 4 in (10.17 m)
- Upper wingspan: 75 ft 10 in (23.11 m)
- Lower wingspan: 48 ft (15 m)
- Height: 15 ft 6 in (4.72 m)
- Empty weight: 4,700 lb (2,132 kg)
- Gross weight: 6,300 lb (2,858 kg)
- Powerplant: 2 × Curtiss V-X inline, 160 hp (120 kW) each

Performance

- Maximum speed: 90 mph (140 km/h, 78 kn)
- Range: 600 mi (970 km, 520 nmi)

Armament

- Guns: 2× .303 in (7.7 mm) Lewis guns
- Bombs: provision for bombs
