= Curtiss V-2 =

V-2
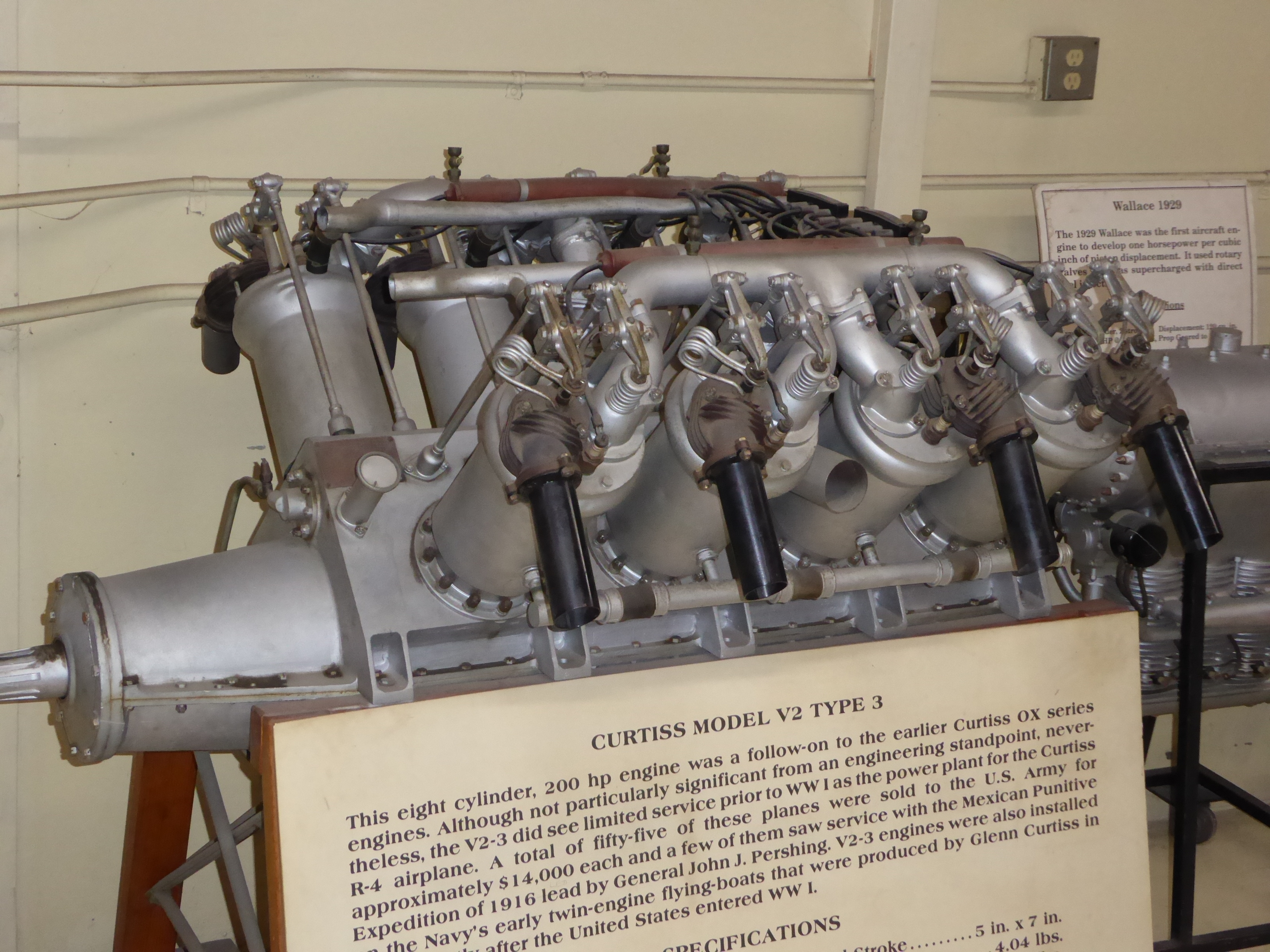
- Type: V-8 liquid-cooled Aero-engine
- National origin: United States of America
- Manufacturer: Curtiss Aircraft
- Number built: 3

The Curtiss V-2 Type 3 (V-2-3) was a liquid-cooled V8 aircraft engine.

== Applications ==
- Canadian Vickers HS-3L Canadian Carrier
- Carlson-Lynch Vertipactor
- Curtiss Model BT
- Curtiss Model R
- Jannus Brothers 1915 Flying Boat

== Specifications ==
Data from: Aerofiles Powerplants

=== General characteristics ===
- Type: liquid-cooled V8 aircraft engine
- Displacement: 1,009.56 cu in (16.5437 L)
- Dry weight: 690 lb (310 kg)

=== Components ===
- Cooling system: Liquid-cooled

=== Performance ===
- Power output: 200 hp (150 kW) at 1400 rpm
