= Marshall Earle Reid =

American aviation pioneer

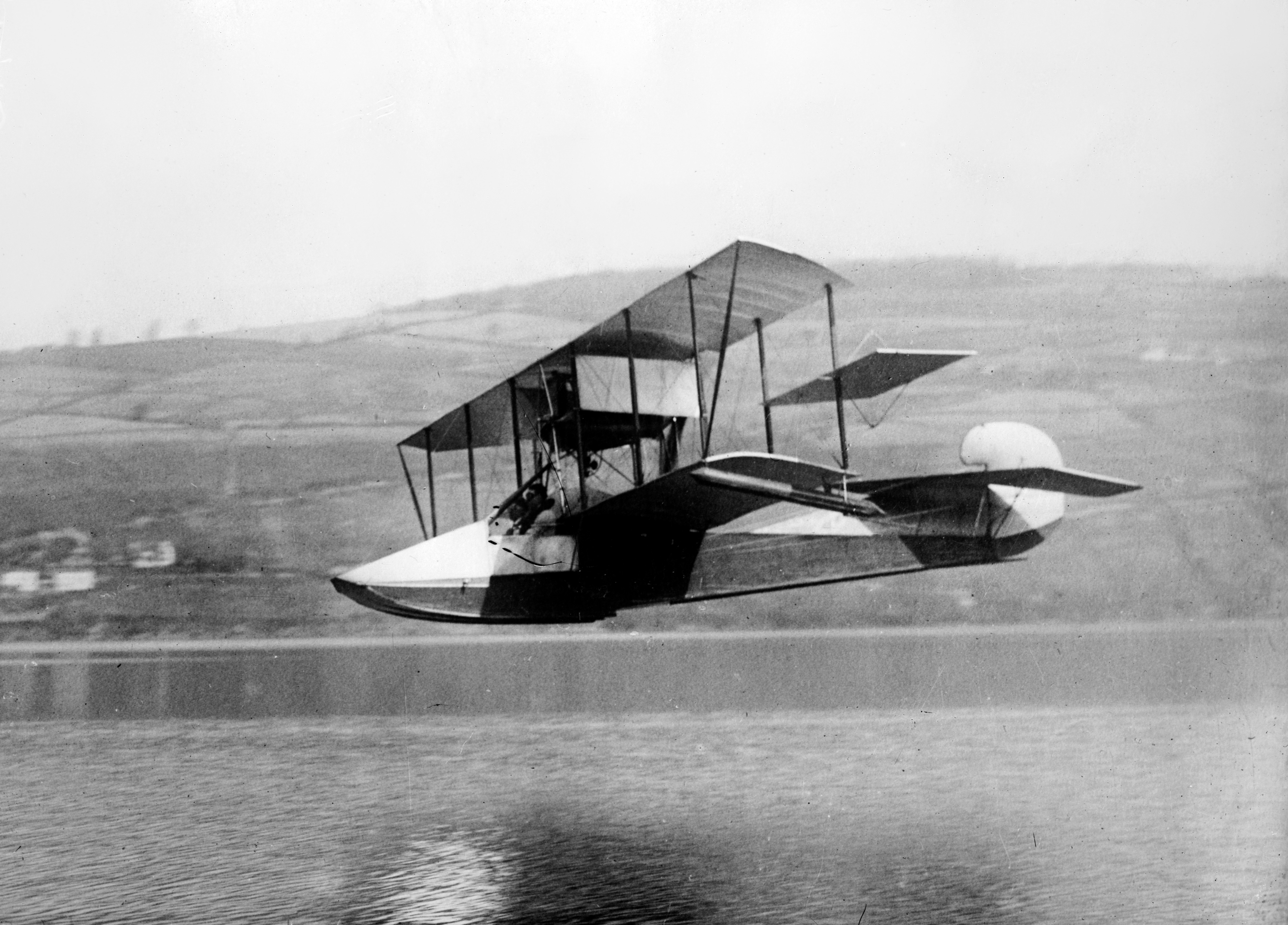
Marshall Earle Reid at Keuka Lake in his Curtiss Model F seaplane

Marshall Earle Reid (August 31, 1887 – December 5, 1955) was an early aviator.

== Biography ==
He was born on August 31, 1887, in Philadelphia to Josephine Elizabeth Myers and Marshall Earl Reid Sr.

On May 4, 1912, he started from Hempstead, Long Island intending to fly to Philadelphia. Near Elizabeth, New Jersey, his biplane crashed but Reid and his passenger George William Beatty crash-landed without injury.

On October 11, 1912, he and Henry Croskey Mustin, his brother-in-law (his sister Helen R. Reid Mustin's husband's brother), flew from Cape May Point, New Jersey.

On June 8, 1912, he was able to travel from Staten Island to Trenton, New Jersey, at 75 miles per hour.

He died on December 5, 1955, at his home in Baltimore, Maryland.
