= White & Thompson Bognor Bloater =

Bognor Bloater
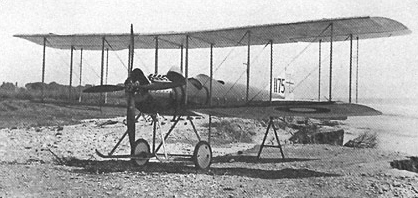

General information
- Type: Reconnaissance and coastal patrol biplane
- National origin: United Kingdom
- Manufacturer: White & Thompson
- Designer: Francis Percy Beadle
- Primary user: Royal Naval Air Service
- Number built: 12

History
- Introduction date: 1915
- First flight: 8 March 1915
- Retired: 1916

The White & Thompson Bognor Bloater was a British First World War two-seat reconnaissance biplane. It was designed and built by White & Thompson Limited of Middleton-on-Sea, near Bognor Regis, Sussex for the Admiralty as a competitor to the Royal Aircraft Factory BE.2. Designated N.T.3 by White & Thompson, it is not known if there was an official designation for the aircraft, which was known in service with the nickname Bognor Bloater.

== Design and development ==
The Bloater was a conventional unequal-span tractor biplane with a monocoque fuselage and powered by a 70 hp (52 kW) Renault engine. Twelve were ordered but only ten were delivered, the other two retained for spares. The Bloater nickname came from the unusual copper-sewn cedar monocoque fuselage built by S.E Saunders (later Saunders-Roe) the first production aircraft to use the monocoque technique.

The prototype was first flown on 8 March 1915 at Bognor by Gordon England.

== Operational history ==
The Bloaters entered service with the Royal Naval Air Service in 1915 and had only limited service in communications and training roles but mainly on coastal patrols from the air stations at Eastbourne, Great Yarmouth and Killingholme.

== Operators ==
United Kingdom

- Royal Naval Air Service

== Specifications ==
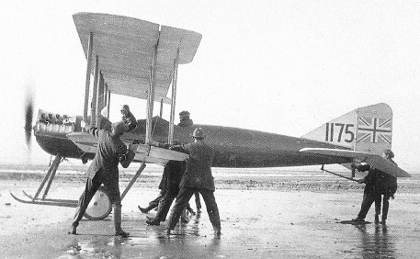
Side elevation

Data from The Norman Thompson File

General characteristics

- Crew: 2 (pilot, observer)
- Length: 28 ft 3 in (8.61 m)
- Wingspan: 37 ft 0 in (11.28 m)
- Height: 12 ft 0 in (3.66 m)
- Powerplant: 1 × Renault 70 hp , 70 hp (52 kW)

== See also ==
Related lists

- List of aircraft of the Royal Naval Air Service
