= Curtiss Model R =

1915 American utility aircraft

Model R
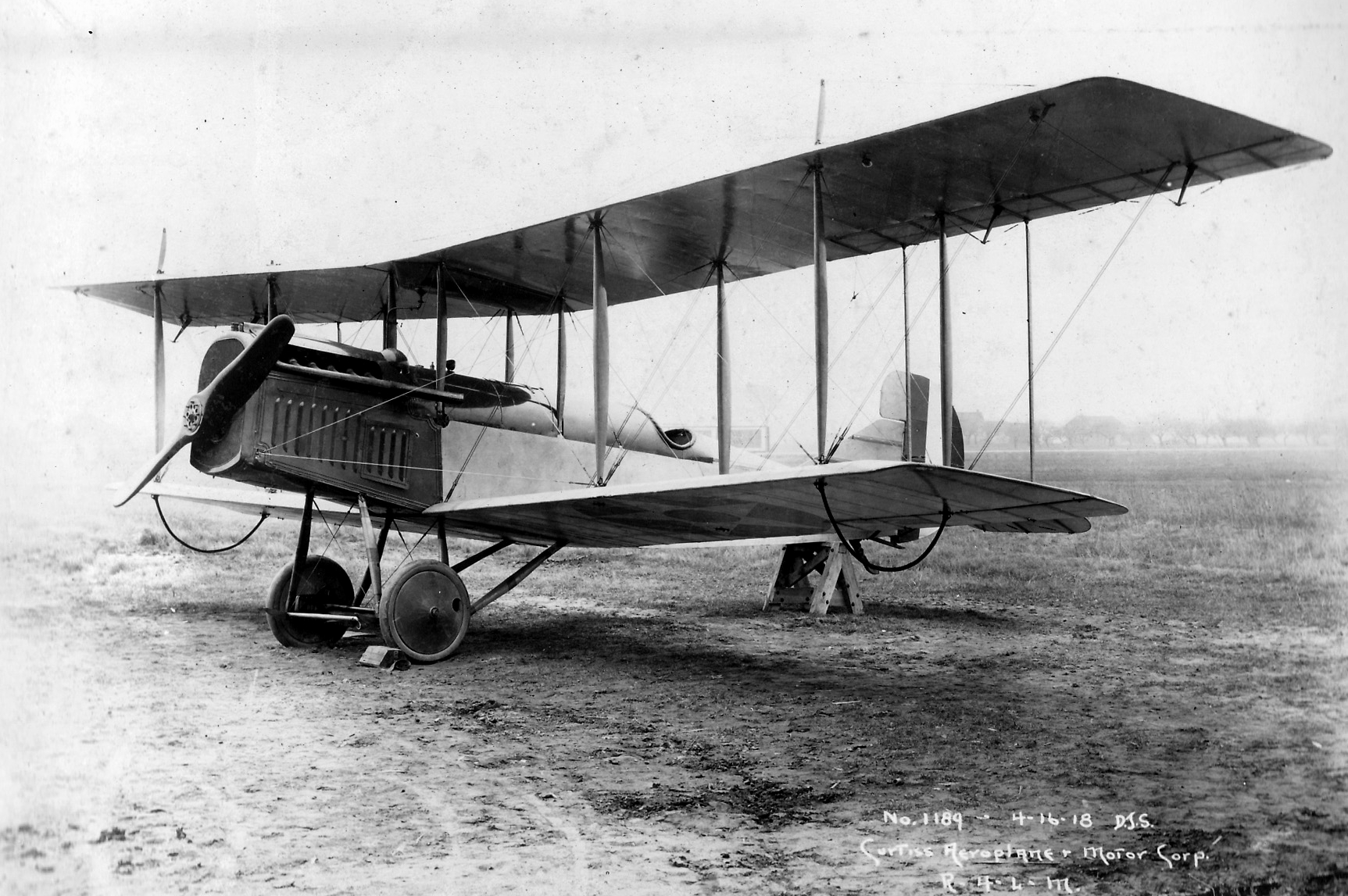
- Curtiss R-4L

General information
- Type: Military utility aircraft
- Designer: Curtiss
- Primary user: United States Army, United States Navy
- Number built: ca. 290

History
- First flight: 1915

The Curtiss Model R was a utility aircraft produced for the United States Army and Navy during World War I. It was a conventional, two-bay biplane with slightly staggered wings of unequal span. The aircraft was provided with two open cockpits in tandem and fixed tailskid undercarriage, but many were built for the Navy with twin floats replacing the wheels. During the course of the war, Model Rs were used for general liaison and communication duties, as well for observation, training, and as air ambulances. In practice, the Curtiss powerplants supplied with these aircraft proved insufficient and were mostly replaced with Liberty engines. The Navy's Model R-3 floatplane had extended-span, three-bay wings, and was intended for use as a torpedo bomber. Some of these were later fitted with wheeled undercarriage and transferred to the Army as bombers under the designation Model R-9.

== Operators ==
United Kingdom

- Royal Navy Air Service

United States

- United States Army
- United States Navy

== Variants ==
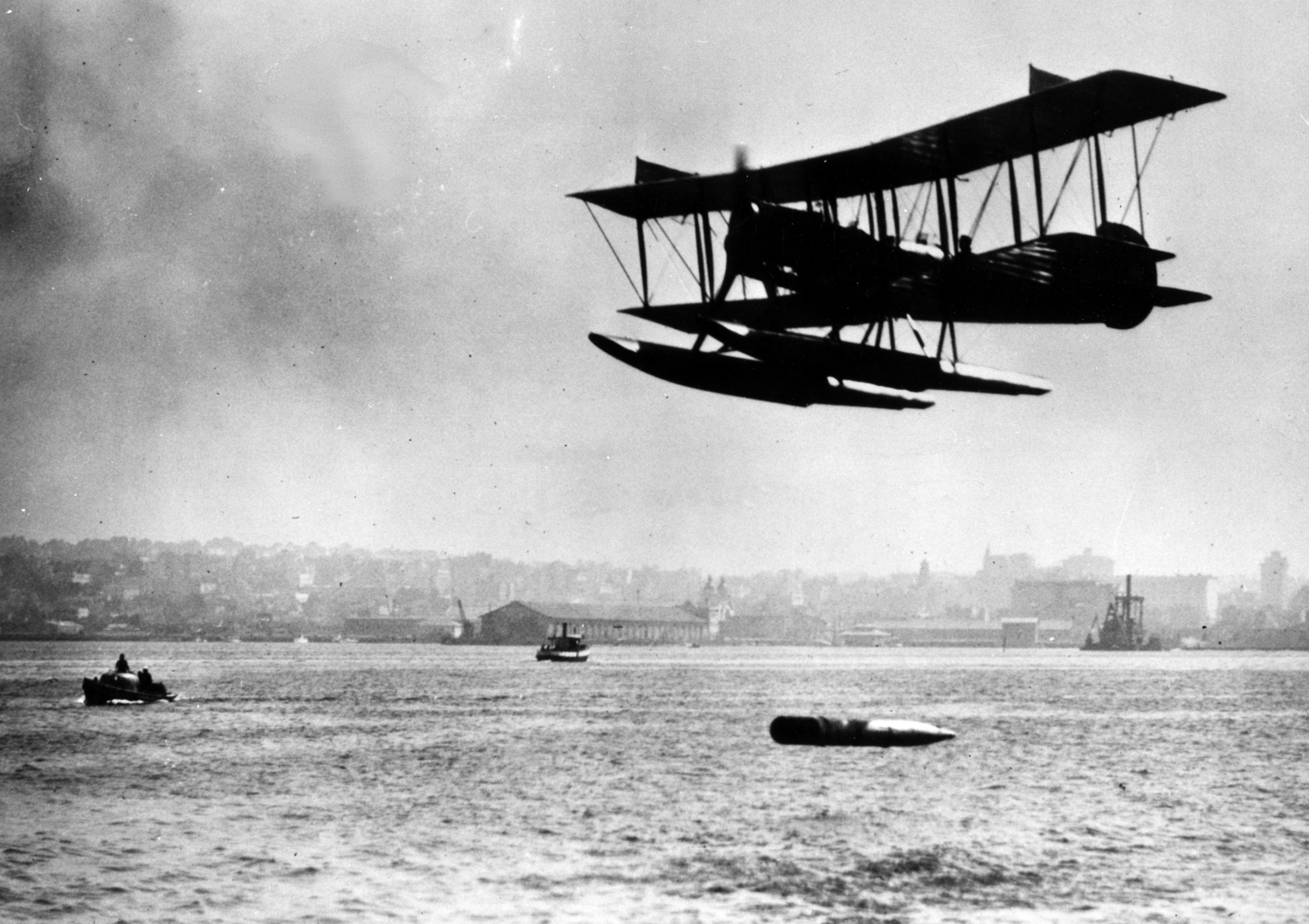
A U.S. Navy R-6L dropping a torpedo.

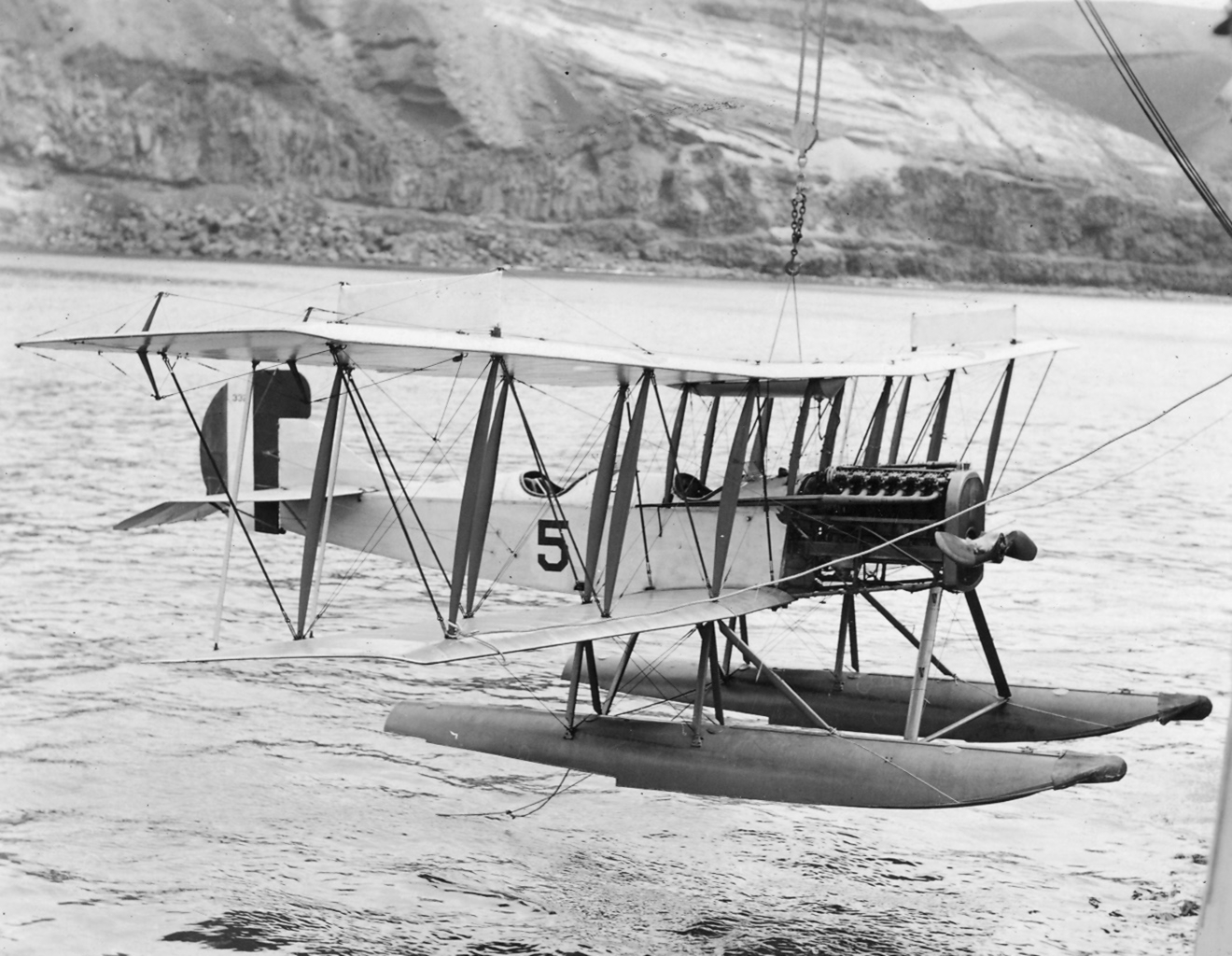
A U.S. Navy R-9.

Model R
Prototype with highly-staggered, equal-span wings and with single long cockpit for pilot and observer. Powered by 160 hp (119 kW) Curtiss V-X engine.
Model R-2
Initial production version, fitted with uneven-span staggered wings and individual, widely-separated cockpits for pilot and observer. 12 built for US Army and 100 for Royal Navy Air Service.
Model R-2A
One-off version, with equal-span wings, which broke the American altitude record of 8,105 ft (2740 m) in August 1915. One built.
Model R-3
Floatplane version for the US Navy, with increased wingspan (57 ft 1 in) wings. Two built.
Model R-4
Improved version of R-2 for US Army, powered by 200 hp (149 kW) Curtiss V-2-3 engine. At least 55 built.
Model R-4L
Model R-4s refitted with Liberty L-12. Several converted plus 12 new build aircraft.
Model R-4LM
Conversion of R-4L into mailplane for US Army, with front cockpit converted to mail compartment with capacity for 400 lb (181 kg) of mail.
Model R-6
Two-seat floatplane with long-span wings of R-3 but powered with Curtiss V-2-3 engine. 76 delivered to US Navy plus some floatplanes and landplanes for US Army. Used for torpedo-bomber trials post war.
Model R-6L
Model R-6 with 360 hp (269 kW) Liberty L-12 engine. 40 converted from R-6 plus 122 built new.
Model R-7
Long range landplane built for The New York Times for an attempted to fly non-stop from Chicago to New York in 1916. It failed to complete the flight but still set an American distance record of 452 miles (727 km). Fitted with long-span wings as R-3 and R-6 and powered by Curtiss V-2-3 engine. One built.
Model R-9
Two-seat bomber version for the US Navy, similar to R-6, but with crew positions reversed so pilot sat in front cockpit and observer in rear. 112 built for the US Navy, ten of which transferred to US Army.
Pusher R
1916 pusher version, based on wings of R, with new fuselage nacelle accommodating two crew. One built.
Twin R
One-off experimental twin-engined conversion of R-2.

== Specifications (R-2) ==
Data from Curtiss Aircraft 1907–1947

General characteristics

- Crew: 1
- Capacity: 1 pax
- Length: 24 ft 4.375 in (7.42633 m)
- Upper wingspan: 45 ft 11.5 in (14.008 m)
- Lower wingspan: 38 ft 5.875 in (11.73163 m)
- Wing area: 504.88 sq ft (46.905 m^{2})
- Airfoil: RAF 6
- Empty weight: 1,822 lb (826 kg)
- Gross weight: 3,092 lb (1,403 kg)
- Powerplant: 1 × Curtiss V-X V-8 water-cooled piston engine, 160 hp (120 kW)
- Propellers: 2-bladed fixed-pitch propeller

Performance

- Maximum speed: 86 mph (138 km/h, 75 kn)
- Endurance: 6 hours 42 minutes
- Time to altitude: 4,000 ft (1,200 m) in 10 minutes

== See also ==
Related development

- Naval Aircraft Factory PT
