= Short S.38 =

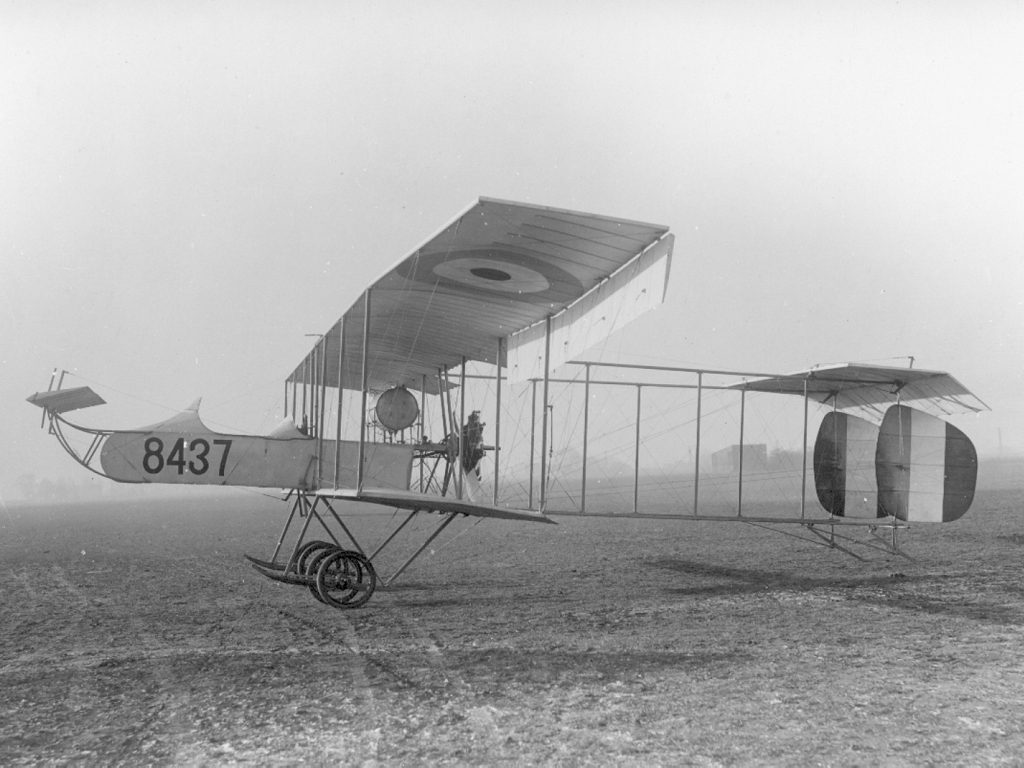
- A Norman Thompson Flight Company-built aircraft with modified landing gear, delivered in 1916

General information
- Type: Coastal patrol, trainer
- National origin: United Kingdom
- Manufacturer: Short Brothers
- Number built: 48

History
- First flight: 30 August 1912

The Short S.38 was an early British aircraft built by Short Brothers.

== Design and development ==
The Short S.38 was originally a Short S.27 with the manufacturer's number S.38. After an accident when hoisting this aircraft aboard HMS London the remains were returned to Shorts, where the aircraft was rebuilt with extensive modifications, the resulting design becoming known as the Short S.38 type.

The rebuilt S.38 had the same basic layout as the original aircraft, being an unequal-span pusher biplane with a forward-mounted elevator and an empennage carried on wire-braced wooden booms behind the wing. It differed in having new wings of increased span, a nacelle to accommodate the two crew members seated in tandem, and modified tail surfaces, the tailplane being enlarged and twin rudders fitted. The front elevator was mounted on booms, as on the original aircraft.

Production aircraft differed in having the front elevator mounted on an upswept outrigger on the front of the nacelle. Additionally, the outer panels of the upper wing had a swept back leading edge, and were rigged with a slight dihedral.

== Service history ==
The aircraft was first flown by Lt. C.R. Samson on 30 August 1912.

Shorts subsequently built nine production aircraft (c/n S.54-62), with some remaining in use with the RNAS after the outbreak of World War I, being used for coastal patrol work at RNAS Great Yarmouth, and later for training purposes at RNAS Eastchurch. In 1915, the RNAS, pleased with their Short pushers, wanted to place orders for further S.38-type aircraft for use as basic trainers. As Short Brothers was busy building later types, orders were instead placed with subcontractors, twelve aircraft being built by Pemberton-Billing Ltd and 24 S.38s by White and Thompson, with deliveries continuing until 1916 and the type remaining in service until 1917.

== Accidents and incidents ==
The type had two fatal accidents:

- 12 September 1915 – Serial number 65 was destroyed in a midair collision with a Caudron G.III at Eastchurch, pilots of both aircraft killed.
- 10 January 1916 – Serial number 3148 crashed while low-flying near Eastbourne, two crew killed.

== Specifications ==
Data from Barnes 1967, p.70

General characteristics

- Crew: two (pilot and observer)
- Length: 35 ft 6 in (10.82 m)
- Wingspan: 52 ft (16 m)
- Wing area: 500 sq ft (46 m^{2})
- Empty weight: 1,100 lb (499 kg)
- Gross weight: 1,500 lb (680 kg)
- Powerplant: 1 × Gnome Lambda 7-cylinder air-cooled radial

Performance

- Maximum speed: 58 mph (93 km/h, 50 kn)
- Range: 290 mi (464 km, 250 nmi)
- Endurance: 5 hours
- Wing loading: 3.0 lb/sq ft (15 kg/m^{2})
