= Naval Aircraft Factory PT =

PT
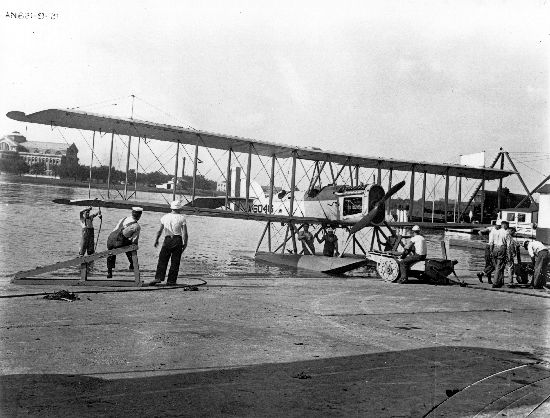

General information
- Type: Floatplane
- National origin: United States
- Manufacturer: Naval Aircraft Factory
- Primary user: United States Navy
- Number built: 33

History
- First flight: 1922

The Naval Aircraft Factory PT were two types of floatplanes built from surplus and spare parts by the United States Navy's Naval Aircraft Factory.

== Development ==
With a shortage of funds at the end of the First World War, the Naval Aircraft Factory built 33 aircraft of two types using surplus assemblies. Both were twin float biplanes based on the fuselage and tail unit of the Curtiss R-6L; the PT-1 was fitted with the 62 ft (18.90m) wings from the Curtiss HS-1L, and the PT-2 fitted with the 74 ft (22.57m) wings from the Curtiss HS-2L.

== Variants ==
PT-1
Fuselage and tail unit of a Curtiss R-6L fitted with wings from a Curtiss HS-1L, 15 built.
PT-2
Fuselage and tail unit of a Curtiss R-6L fitted with wings from a Curtiss HS-2L, 18 built.

== Operator ==
United States

- United States Navy

== Specifications (PT-2) ==
General characteristics

- Length: 38 ft 5 in (11.71 m)
- Wingspan: 74 ft 0.25 in (22.57 m)
- Powerplant: 1 × Liberty piston engine , 330 hp (246 kW)

Performance

== See also ==
- Curtiss R-6
- Curtiss HS-1L
- Curtiss HS-2L

Related lists

- List of military aircraft of the United States (Naval)
- List of flying boats and floatplanes
