= Norman Thompson Flight Company =

British flying boat manufacturer of the 1910s

- Company type: Aircraft manufacturer
- Industry: Aviation
- Predecessor: White and Thompson Company
- Founded: 8 June 1912 (White and Thompson)
- Defunct: 12 July 1919
- Fate: Voluntary liquidation – factories and stock purchased by Handley Page
- Successor: Handley Page Ltd
- Headquarters: Bognor Regis
- Key people: Norman Arthur Thompson; Dr. Douglas White; Glen Curtiss; Eric Gordon England; John Cyril Porte; Francis Percy Beadle

The Norman Thompson Flight Company was a British aircraft manufacturer specialising in the construction of flying boats. It was formed as the White and Thompson Company in 1912, and designed and built the Norman Thompson NT.4 patrol aircraft and the N.T.2B flying boat trainer for the Royal Naval Air Service during the First World War, but production problems led to the company entering receivership in 1918, being liquidated in 1919.

== History ==
In 1909, Norman Arthur Thompson, an Electrical Engineer born in 1874 at Streatham, London, became interested in the science and practice of Aeronautics after reading two books by the pioneer aerodynamacist Frederick W. Lanchester. Thompson, after securing finance from Dr Douglas White, a wealthy friend, approached Lanchester and persuaded him to collaborate on designing an aircraft. Lanchester designed a two-seat pusher configuration biplane powered by two 50 hp (37 kW) rotary engines, the Thompson-Lanchester No. 1 Biplane or Gray Angel. This was completed during 1910, but proved incapable of any more than brief hops, and was eventually scrapped.

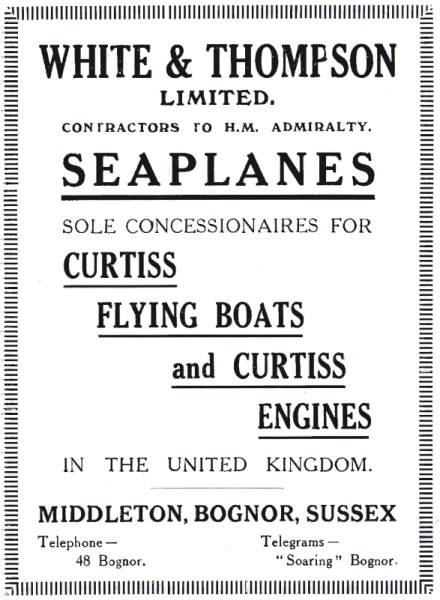
Advertisement, January 1915

Despite these setbacks, which used up most of White's initial capital, Thompson and White set up a limited company, "White and Thompson" on 8 June 1912 to continue their aviation business. In early 1913 Thompson, working on his own without the involvement of Lanchester designed a second aircraft, the Norman Thompson No. 1 Biplane, another pusher, this time powered by a single 100 hp (75 kW) water-cooled ABC engine, which successfully flew. This was not progressed further, however, as White and Thompson was hired to maintain a Curtiss Model F flying boat, and was appointed the exclusive European agents for Curtiss in February 1914.

In the summer of 1914, White and Thompson designed and built two flying boats to compete in the Daily Mail £5,000 Circuit of Britain race for seaplanes, a single-engined flying boat, and a larger twin-engined aircraft. Although the race was cancelled owing to the outbreak of the First World War, the single-engined aircraft was successful, and a further eight were built for the RNAS as the White and Thompson No. 3, being delivered in 1915, as were 10 examples of the "Bognor Bloater", a single-engined landplane.

White left White and Thompson in 1915 to join the Royal Army Medical Corps, the company being re-organised as the Norman Thompson Flight Company, and expanding its factories to cope with increased demand for its aircraft, orders being placed for the N.T.4, a twin-engined patrol flying boat of similar size to the Curtiss H-4 Small America, and the N.T.2B, a single-engined flying boat trainer. A change in RNAS requirements lead to the sudden cancellation of orders for the N.T.4. however, while engine problems caused delays to the delivery of N.T.2Bs.

These problems caused Norman Thompson to go into receivership on 19 April 1918, an attempt to sue Curtiss over breaking the 1914 agreement for White and Thompson to have exclusive sales rights in Europe getting nowhere. The Norman Thompson Flight Company went into Voluntary liquidation on 12 July 1919, the company's factory and stock being purchased by Handley Page.

== Aircraft ==
- White & Thompson No. 1 Seaplane
- White and Thompson No. 3
- White & Thompson Bognor Bloater
- Norman Thompson N.1B
- Norman Thompson N.T.2B
- Norman Thompson N.T.4

== See also ==
- Short S.38
