= Carlson-Lynch Vertipactor =

1920s American VTOL aircraft

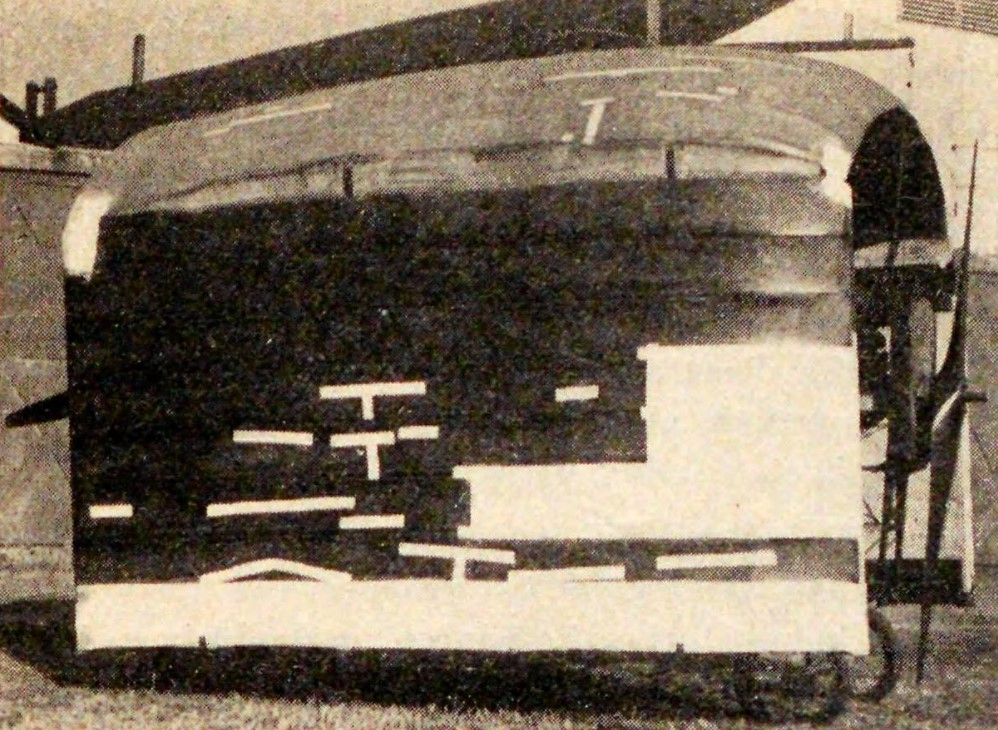
- Side view of the Carlson-Lynch Vertipactor

General information
- Type: VTOL aircraft
- Manufacturer: Ivar Carlson; John Henry Lynch
- Number built: 1

History
- Introduction date: 1923

The Carlson-Lynch Vertipactor was an experimental VTOL aircraft designed and built by two American inventors — Ivar Carlson and John Lynch — in the early 1920s and tested at Curtiss Field, Long Island, New York. It did not fly.

== Design and development ==
The Vertipactor was a wingless airplane, designed to rise vertically by virtue of the slipstream from two propellers interacting with a canopy covering the aircraft, pushing the aircraft in a vertical direction upwards. The craft was fitted with a large canopy which enveloped the whole craft. The canopy had two vertical side walls connected to an arch at the top of the craft and was open at each end. Propellers at each end of the craft would force air into the Vertipactor and with the propwash then moving downwards, generating a lifting thrust. Within the canopy was a box-like girder fuselage, with a 200 hp Curtiss engine and propeller fitted at each end. The craft was fitted with a four-wheeled undercarriage.

In 1922, Carlson was granted patent No. 1,405,667, for an "Aeroplane", embodying the principle behind the Vertipactor.

== Operational history ==
The craft was said by its inventors that, in December 1922, it made a flight lasting 15 minutes, rising to an altitude of 6 ft (1.8 m). Contemporary newspaper reports from July 1923 indicated that the craft would be undergoing formal testing at Curtiss Field (now known as Columbia Field), near Mineola, Long Island, New York, however the outcome of those tests are not known. A February 1924 magazine article appears to have been the last time the craft had been mentioned in the press, but without mention being made of it having flown.

== Specifications ==
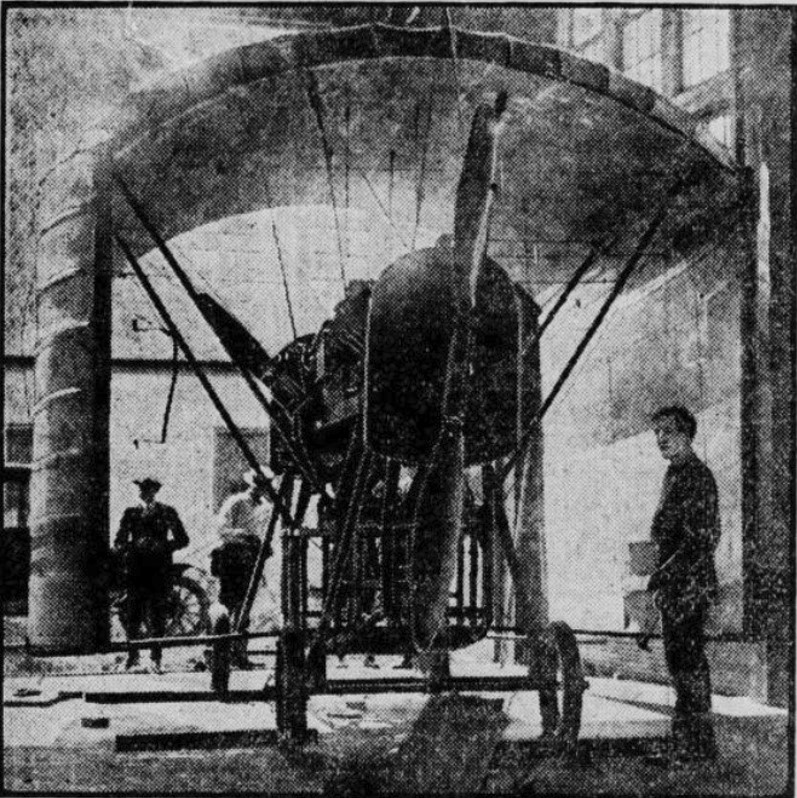
Front view of the Vertipactor

Data from Proceedings of the United States Naval Institute and New York Times

General characteristics

- Crew: 1
- Length: 15 ft (4.6 m)
- Wingspan: 12 ft (3.7 m)
- Height: 12 ft (3.7 m)
- Gross weight: 3,000 lb (1,361 kg)
- Powerplant: 2 × Curtiss , 200 hp (150 kW) each

Performance
