= White and Thompson No. 3 =

British flying boat of the First World War

White and Thompson No.3
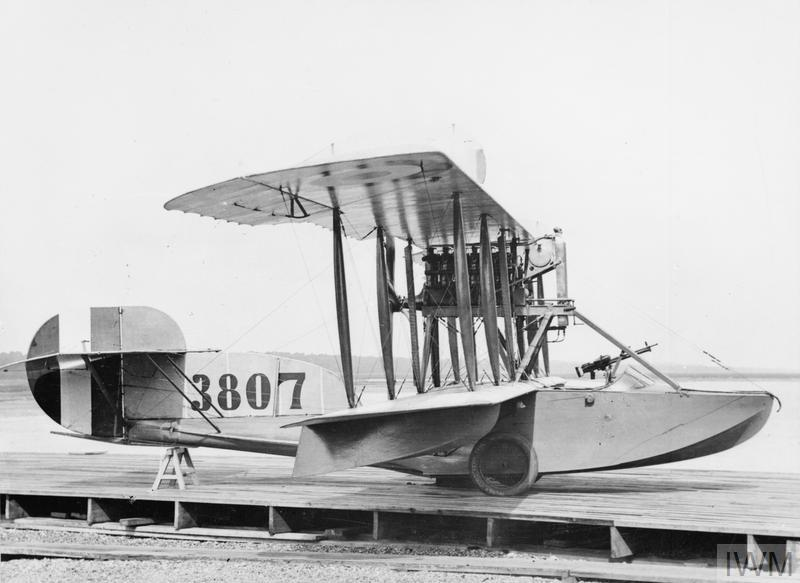

General information
- Type: Flying boat
- National origin: United Kingdom
- Manufacturer: White and Thompson
- Designer: Norman Thompson
- Primary user: Royal Naval Air Service
- Number built: 9

History
- First flight: 1 August 1914
- Developed from: White and Thompson No. 2

The White and Thompson No. 3 was a British flying boat of the First World War. While the prototype was originally designed to compete in an air-race around the UK, eight more similar aircraft were built for the Royal Naval Air Service.

== Development and design ==
In 1914, the White and Thompson Company Limited of Bognor Regis, England, who had become exclusive licence holders for Curtiss flying boats for Great Britain the previous year, decided to build two different flying boats: a single-engine and a larger twin-engine machine. They were set to compete in the Daily Mail £5,000 Circuit of Britain race for seaplanes, scheduled to start on 10 August that year.

The first to be completed was the single-engine machine, designated the White and Thompson No. 2 Flying Boat. This was a two-bay, uneven-span pusher biplane powered by a 120 hp (90 kW) Beardmore-built Austro Daimler engine mounted between the upper and lower wings. Its hull, the construction of which was subcontracted to S. E. Saunders, was of copper sewn mahogany (or Consuta) over a wooden frame and carried a crew of two in a side-by-side cockpit. It first flew on 1 August 1914, but was impressed by the Royal Naval Air Service owing to the situation in Europe, with Britain declaring war with Germany on 4 August.

An order for eight similar flying boats followed, designated White and Thompson No.3. These had rounded wingtips and a larger tail fin, and had the central fin surface that was mounted above the upper wing centre-section on the prototype replaced by two smaller surfaces above the wings. The production aircraft were powered by a 120 hp Beardmore engine, although one aircraft was fitted with a 150 hp (112 kW) Hispano-Suiza.

== Operational history ==
The prototype, fitted with bomb-racks, proved reliable and popular, and was operated by the RNAS until being wrecked in June 1915. The first production aircraft was delivered to No. 1 Squadron RNAS on 7 February 1915. The No. 3 flying boats, which could be fitted with a Lewis gun on the port side of the cockpit were used for anti-submarine patrols from various bases both in the United Kingdom and France (with one force landing in the Netherlands and being interned) and latterly for training.

== Operators ==
United Kingdom

- Royal Naval Air Service
  - No.1 Squadron RNAS

== Specifications of prototype ==
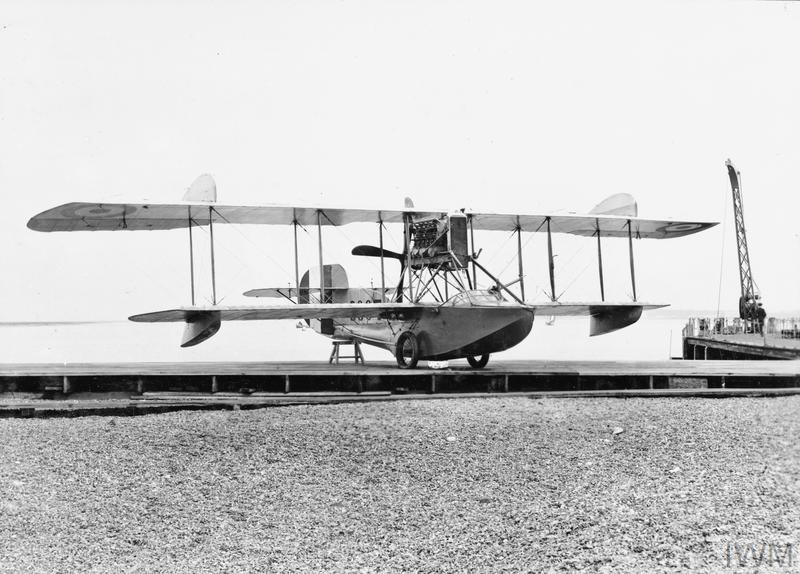
Front right quarter view.

Data from Bognor's Boats

General characteristics

- Crew: 2
- Length: 27 ft 6 in (8.38 m)
- Wingspan: 45 ft 0 in (13.72 m)
- Height: 10 ft 5 in (3.18 m)
- Wing area: 400 sq ft (37 m^{2})
- Airfoil: RAF 6
- Empty weight: 1,600 lb (726 kg)
- Gross weight: 2,400 lb (1,089 kg)
- Powerplant: 1 × Austro-Daimler 120hp 6-cylinder water-cooled in-line piston engine, 120 hp (89 kW)
- Propellers: 4-bladed fixed-pitch propeller

Performance

- Maximum speed: 70 mph (110 km/h, 61 kn)

85 mph (74 kn; 137 km/h) - production aircraft

- Endurance: 6 hours
- Time to altitude: 10,000 ft (3,048 m) in 33 minutes 40 seconds
- Wing loading: 6 lb/sq ft (29 kg/m^{2})
- Power/mass: 0.05 hp/lb (0.082 kW/kg)

Armament

- Guns: 1x .303 in (7.70 mm) (7.7 mm) Lewis gun

== See also ==
Related development

- Curtiss Model F
- Norman Thompson N.T.2B

Related lists

- List of flying boats and floatplanes
- List of aircraft of the Royal Naval Air Service

== Bibliography ==
- Bruce, J. M. British Aeroplanes 1914–18. London:Putnam, 1957.
- Goodall, Michael H. The Norman Thompson File. Tunbridge Wells, UK: Air-Britain, 1995. ISBN 0-85130-233-5.
- Klaauw, Bart van der (March–April 1999). "Unexpected Windfalls: Accidentally or Deliberately, More than 100 Aircraft 'arrived' in Dutch Territory During the Great War". Air Enthusiast (80): 54–59. ISSN 0143-5450.
- London, Peter. "Island Pioneers; Aircraft Production Origins on the Isle of Wight". Air Enthusiast, No. 56, Winter 1994. Stamford, UK:Key Publishing. ISSN 0143-5450. pp. 71–77.
- London, Peter. "Bognor's Boats: The Aircraft of Norman Thompson". Air Enthusiast, No. 66, November–December 1996. Stamford, UK:Key Publishing. ISSN 0143-5450. pp. 70–75.
- Thetford, Owen. British Naval Aircraft since 1912. London:Putnam, Fourth edition, 1978. ISBN 0-370-30021-1.
