= Norman Thompson N.T.4 =

Twin-engined British flying boat

N.T.4
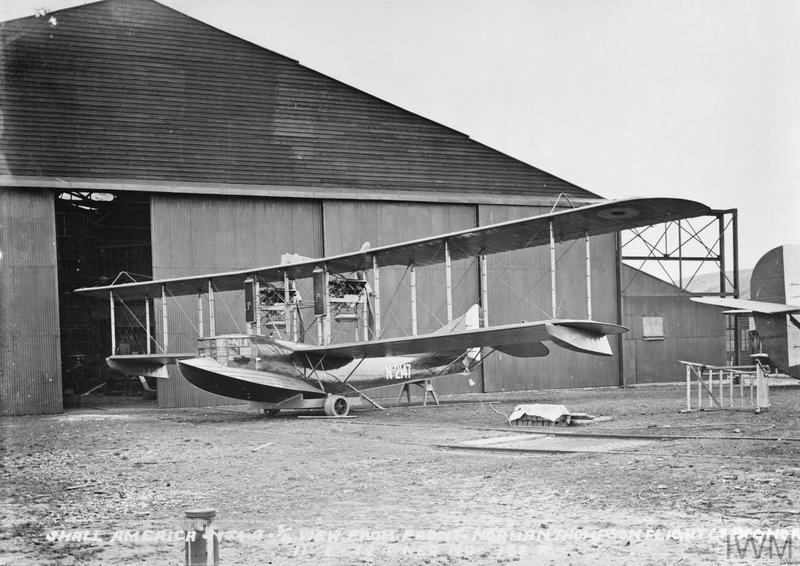
- NT4A, February 1918.

General information
- Type: Patrol Flying Boat
- Manufacturer: Norman Thompson Flight Company
- Designer: Francis Percy Beadle
- Primary user: Royal Naval Air Service
- Number built: 26 (N.T.4), 44 (N.T.4A), 2 (N2C)

History
- Introduction date: 1916
- First flight: October 1916
- Retired: 1918
- Variant: Gosport Mail

The Norman Thompson N.T.4 was a twin-engined British flying boat of the First World War. Although less well known than similar Curtiss and Felixstowe flying boats, 50 were ordered for Britain's Royal Naval Air Service.

== Development and design ==
The White and Thompson company was formed by Norman Thompson and Douglas White in 1912 at Bognor Regis, Sussex to design and build aircraft. It built several models of aircraft in small numbers, before being renamed the Norman Thompson Flight Company in September 1915.

The first aircraft to be produced by the renamed company was a twin-engined patrol flying boat, the Norman Thompson N.T.4. This was a three bay biplane powered by two pusher Hispano-Suiza engines mounted between the wings and was fitted with an enclosed, heavily glazed cockpit for its four-man crew.

An initial order for ten aircraft for the Royal Naval Air Service was placed in December 1915, with the first prototype flying in October 1916. Further orders were placed in 1917 bringing the total ordered to 50. Production continued through 1917, but in 1918, following a change in policy on anti-submarine aircraft, the final contract for 20 aircraft was cancelled. Total production was 26 aircraft, continuing until June 1918.

Norman Thompson produced a revised design to meet the requirements of Admiralty Specification N.2C, to replace the N.T.4. This type, designated the Norman Thompson N.2C used the wings of the N.T.4 but with a new hull resembling that of the Porte/Felixstowe boats. Power was by two 200 hp (149 kW) Sunbeam Arab engines. The first prototype attempted to fly on 1 August 1918, but required changes to the hull before it was capable of take-off. Water handling remained poor, and the aircraft was tail heavy in flight. It was abandoned following the end of the war.

== Operational history ==
The N.T.4 entered service with the RNAS in 1916, being operated on anti-submarine patrols over the North Sea and English Channel but were mainly used for training, as larger aircraft were more suitable for patrol purposes. Many of the aircraft produced in 1918 were delivered straight to storage and were never used. Owing to its similarity in size to the Curtiss H-4, it shared the Curtiss flying boat's nickname of America, being renamed Small America when the larger Curtiss H-12 (known as Large America) and Felixstowe F.2 flying boats came into service.

== Variants ==
N.T.4
Initial batch of six aircraft. Powered by two 150 hp Hispano-Suiza engines.
N.T.4A
Main production type. Powered by 200 hp geared Hispano-Suiza engines. 44 built.
N2C
Improved version with hull similar to Felixstowe flying boats, powered by two Sunbeam Arab engines. Two prototypes only built in 1918.

== Operators ==
United Kingdom

- Royal Naval Air Service

== Specifications (N.T.4A) ==
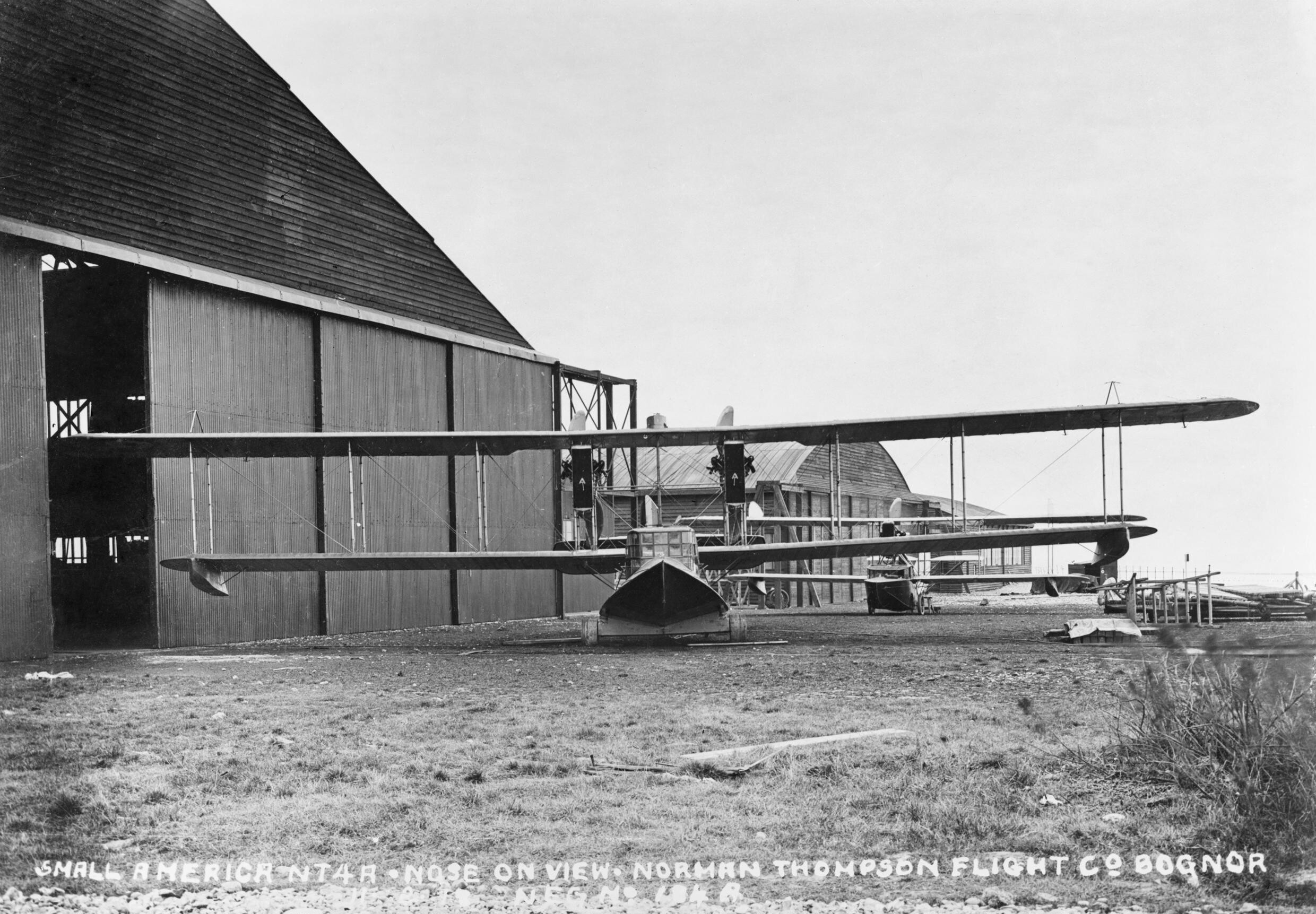
"NOSE ON VIEW", fitted with 2 x 150 h.p. Hispano-Suiza engines, February 1918.

Data from British Naval Aircraft since 1912

General characteristics

- Crew: 4
- Length: 41 ft 6 in (12.65 m)
- Wingspan: 78 ft 7 in (23.95 m)
- Height: 14 ft 10 in (4.52 m)
- Wing area: 936 sq ft (87.0 m^{2})
- Empty weight: 4,572 lb (2,074 kg)
- Gross weight: 6,469 lb (2,934 kg)
- Powerplant: 2 × Hispano-Suiza 8B V-6 water-cooled piston engines, 200 hp (150 kW) each
- Propellers: 2-bladed fixed-pitch propellers

Performance

- Maximum speed: 95 mph (153 km/h, 83 kn) at 2,000 ft (610 m)
- Cruise speed: 69 mph (111 km/h, 60 kn)
- Endurance: 6 hours
- Service ceiling: 11,700 ft (3,600 m)
- Time to altitude: 10,000 ft (3,048 m) 31 minutes 5 seconds
- Wing loading: 6.91 lb/sq ft (33.7 kg/m^{2})
- Power/mass: 0.062 hp/lb (0.102 kW/kg)

Armament

- Guns: Provision for Lewis guns firing through side window
- Bombs: Bomb racks under lower wing

== See also ==
Related development

- Gosport Mail

Aircraft of comparable role, configuration, and era

- Curtiss H-4
- Curtiss H-12
- Felixstowe F.2
