= Curtiss V =

Curtiss engine

Model "V"
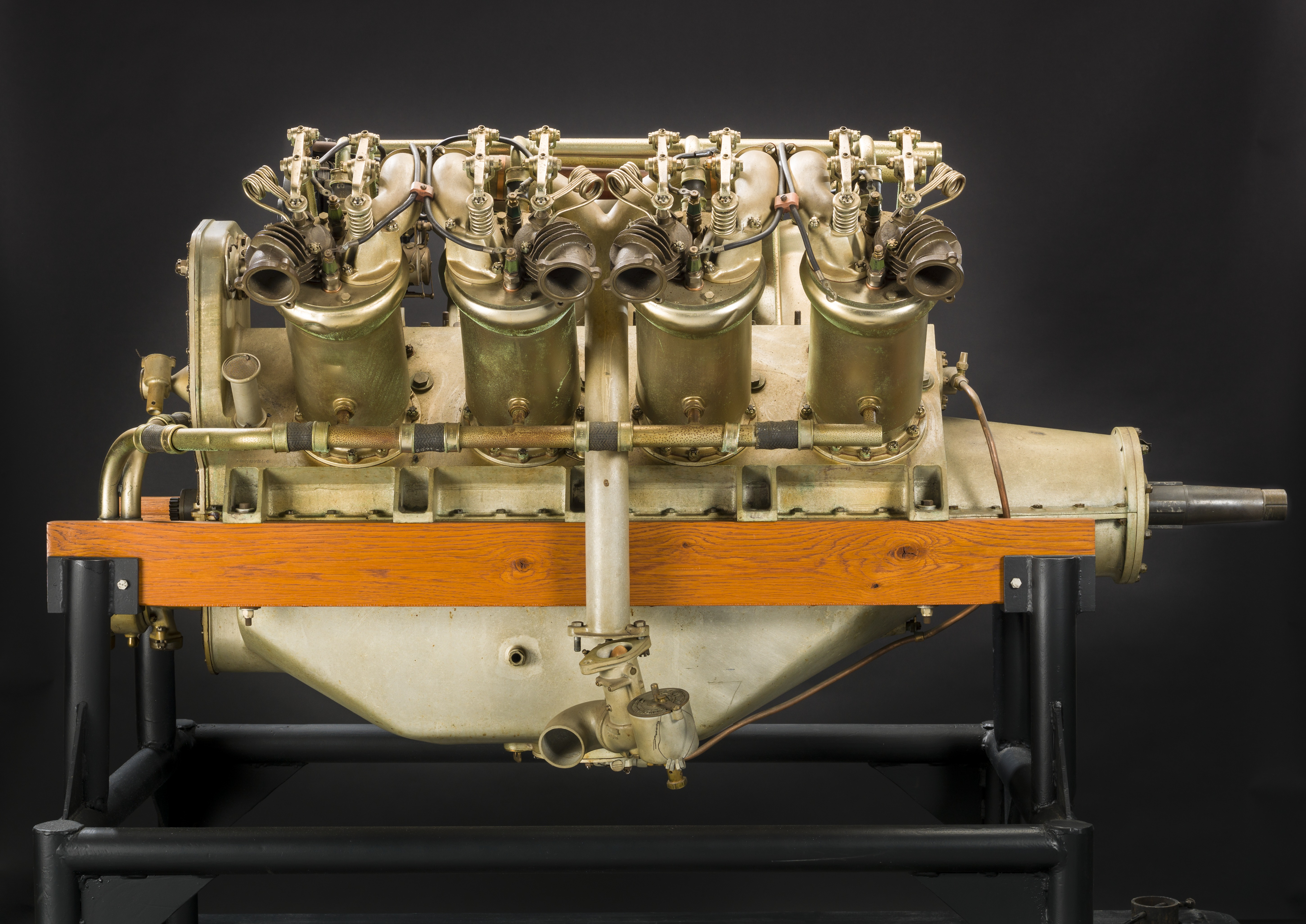
- Curtiss V-X aircraft engine
- Type: V-8 piston engine
- National origin: United States
- Manufacturer: Curtiss Aeroplane and Motor Company
- First run: 1915
- Major applications: Curtiss Model R
- Developed into: Curtiss V-2

The Curtiss V is a 160 hp (120 kW) water-cooled V-8 aero-engine. A nearly identical engine rated for 180 hp (130 kW) was marketed as the V-X.

The engine was produced at Curtiss's Hammondsport and Buffalo facilities from 1915 to power the Curtiss R-series biplane trainers.. Curtiss continued development of the "V" series eventually producing the 200 hp (150 kW) Curtiss V-2.

With the onset of World War I, Curtiss shifted its focus to the 67 kW (90 hp) Curtiss OX-5, which became the primary powerplant for the Curtiss JN Jenny trainer aircraft. The introduction of the government’s Liberty L-12 engine addressed the demand for higher power, leading to the discontinuation of the V series before it reached mass production.

== Variants ==
V
Rated for 160 hp (120 kW) at 1,100 rpm
V-X
Rated for 180 hp (130 kW) at 1,400 rpm

== Applications ==
- Curtiss Model R

== Specifications (V-X) ==
Data from the Smithsonian

=== General characteristics ===
- Type: 8-cylinder water-cooled Vee piston engine
- Bore: 5 in (127 mm)
- Stroke: 7 in (178 mm)
- Displacement: 1,100 cu in (18.0 L)
- Length: 75.5 in (1,918 mm)
- Width: 44.5 in (1,130 mm)
- Height: 56 in (1,422 mm)

=== Components ===
- Valvetrain: One intake and one exhaust valve per cylinder, pushrod-actuated
- Cooling system: Water-cooled

=== Performance ===
- Power output: 180 hp (134 kW) at 1,400 rpm

== See also ==
- List of aircraft engines
