= Curtiss Model F =

American 1912 single engine flying boat

Model F
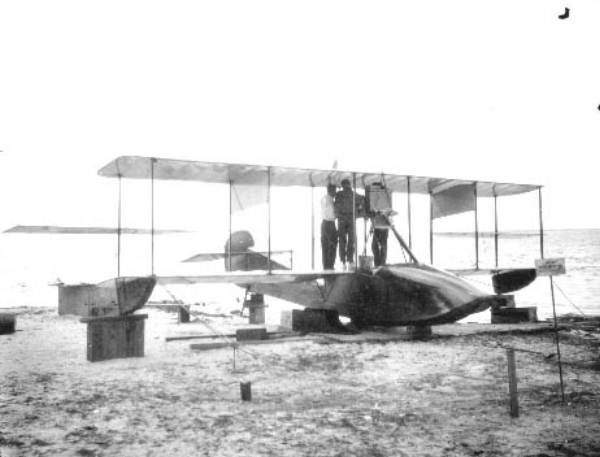

General information
- Type: Utility flying boat
- Manufacturer: Curtiss Aeroplane and Motor Company
- Designer: Glenn Curtiss
- Primary users: United States Navy Russian Navy; Italian Navy
- Number built: over 150

History
- First flight: 12 January 1912

The Curtiss Models F made up a family of early flying boats developed in the United States in the years leading up to World War I. Widely produced, Model Fs saw service with the United States Navy under the designations C-2 through C-5, later reclassified to AB-2 through AB-5. Several examples were exported to Russia, and the type was built under license in Italy.

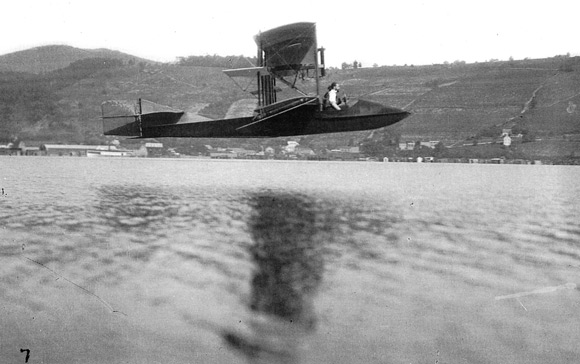
First successful flight of the Curtiss Flying Fish over Keuka Lake, July 1912.

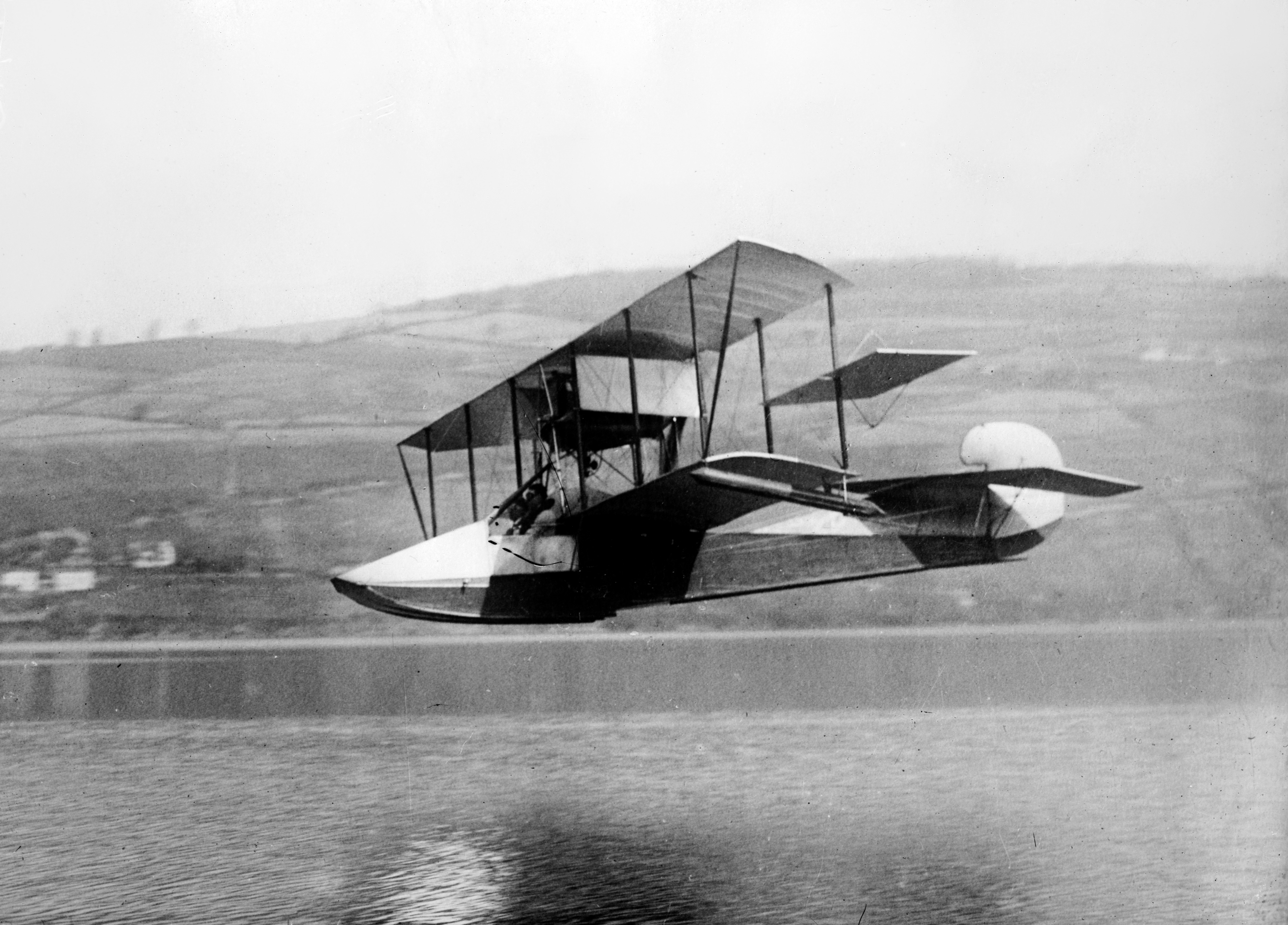
Marshall Earle Reid at Lake Keuka in his Curtiss seaplane, 1912. Note the step in the hull.

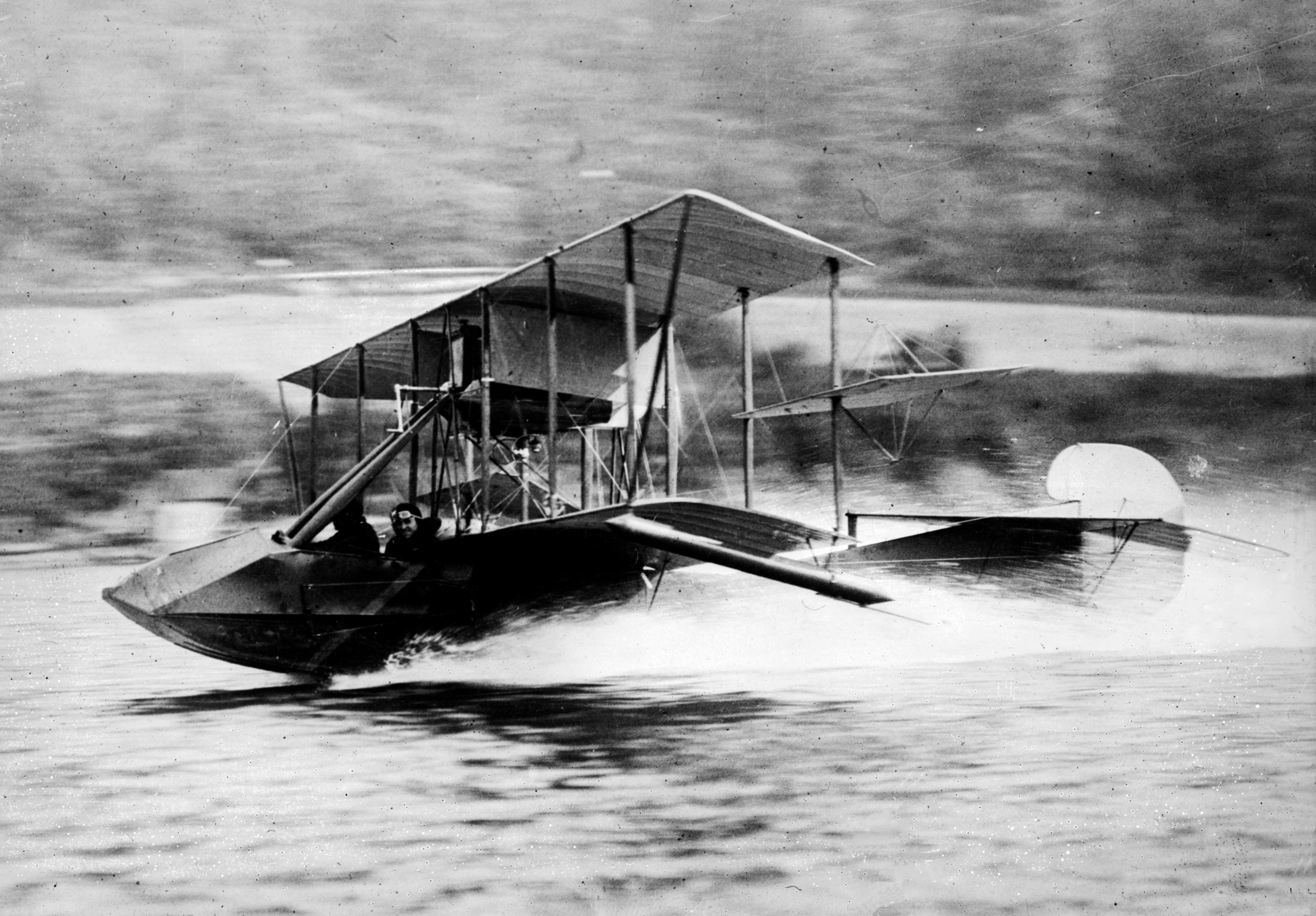
Gustave Maurice Heckscher in his Curtiss seaplane at 60 miles per hour, 1912.

== Design and development ==
In configuration, these were biplane flying boats powered by a single engine mounted amongst the interplane struts and driving a pusher propeller. The pilot and a single passenger sat side by side in an open cockpit. The wing cellule was derived from the Model E landplane and was of two-bay, unstaggered, equal-span construction with large ailerons mounted on the interplane struts and extending past the span of the wings themselves. The earliest examples of this design were built and sold by Curtiss in 1912 without any designation applied to them; the Model F name only coming into use the following year. Confusingly, Curtiss also used the designation Model E to refer to some early machines in this family, although these were quite distinct from Curtiss landplanes that bore this same designation and all but identical to the Model Fs.

Model Fs built from 1918 featured a revised, unequal-span wing that incorporated the ailerons into the upper wing and sponsons on the sides of the hull to improve the aircraft's handling in water. These were known as the Model MF (for Modernised-F), and years later as the Seagull in the postwar civil market.

== Operational history ==
The US Navy initially purchased four of these aircraft in addition to the Freak Boat (C-1/AB-1) that it had already obtained and which was retrofitted to approximately the same design as the others. One of these, the C-2 became the first aircraft to fly under automatic control on 30 August 1913 when fitted with a gyroscopic stabiliser designed by Elmer Sperry. The same aircraft (by now redesignated AB-2) then became the first aircraft to be launched by catapult from a warship while underway when it took off from USS North Carolina on 5 November 1915, piloted by Captain Henry C. Mustin, Navy Air Pilot No.3, and Naval Aviator No. 11. Her sister, AB-3, became the first US heavier-than-air aircraft to see military action when launched from the USS Mississippi on 25 April 1914 on a scouting mission over Veracruz during the United States Occupation of Veracruz.

The US Navy bought another eight aircraft before the end of 1916, but orders in quantity only came following the type's selection as the Navy's standard flying-boat trainer in April 1917. An initial batch of 144 of the basic F model were ordered, followed by 22 MFs in 1918. Another 80 MFs were produced under license by the Naval Aircraft Factory. This aircraft was especially useful for training because of its favorable stall recovery, while many other aircraft of the era were likely to stall into a spin. A small number of Model Es and Fs were also purchased by the US Army.

The Russian Navy purchased two batches of Model Fs in 1913-14 and operated them as part of the Black Sea and Baltic Sea fleets until replaced by the Model K shortly thereafter. In Italy, the Curtiss representative Enea Bossi secured rights for local license-production of the Type F by the Zari brothers, who built eight examples at their workshop in Bovisa, Milan. The first of these was demonstrated to the Italian Navy on Lake Como on 22 September 1914. The Model F was adopted by Regia Marina on the battleship Dante Alighieri, cruisers Amalfi and San Marco, and the seaplane tender Elba.

Rogers Airlines operated a postwar fleet of ten Curtiss Seagulls as late as 1927. The aircraft flew routes out of Miami and Nassau in the winter months and returned to upstate New York for maintenance and barnstorming in the summer.

== Variants ==
Model E
Designation sometime erroneously applied to certain early members of this family.
Model F
Standard production model from 1912 onwards, received this designation 1914, and given numerical designation of Model 7 in 1930.
Sperry-Curtiss
Amphibious version of Model E for Lawrence Sperry.
School Machine
Trainer with nose boarding ramp.
Sport Boat
Three-seat deluxe version.
Reid Hydroaeroplane
Custom version for Marshall Reid with shoulder-yoke aileron controls.
Model FL
Model F fitted with wings from Curtiss Model L. Single example, also designated Model 7 built 1917.
Model BAT
Tractor-engined prototype for MF, later designated Model 13 in Curtiss sequence.
Model BAP
Pusher-engined prototype for MF similar to BAT, later designated Model 14 in Curtiss sequence.
Model MF
Modernised version of 1914, production standard from 1918 onwards, later designated Model 18
Cox-Klemin CK-14
Model MFs rebuilt and modified to use 180 hp Hispano Suiza engine
Seagull
Postwar civil version of MF with two additional seats, later designated Model 25. Approximately 16 sold.
Crane
Amphibious version of Seagull, later designated Model 20.
Judson Triplane
Enlarged custom triplane version.
McCormick Flying Boat
Enlarged, five-seat custom version for Harold Fowler McCormick.

== Operators ==
Brazil

- Brazilian Naval Aviation

Kingdom of Italy

- Regia Marina

New Zealand

- Walsh Brothers Flying School, New Zealand, 5 aircraft used to train pilots for the Royal Flying Corps

Ottoman Empire

- Ottoman Navy - one Model F

Russian Empire

- Imperial Russian Navy - received two batches of Model Fs in 1913–14.

United Kingdom

- White and Thompson - one Model F

United States

- United States Navy
- United States Army
- American Trans-Oceanic Company

== Surviving aircraft ==
- The engine and radiator of a Model F are preserved at the Cradle of Aviation Museum on Long Island.
- Parts of Model F serial number 112, which crashed in Connecticut in 1915, were incorporated into a restoration by Century Aviation in Wenatchee, WA in 2016–2018. The plane took its first flight on Moses Lake in Washington on August 21, 2018.
- Curtiss MF/ Seagull NC903 (ex C903, US Navy A5541) is on display at the Omaka Aviation Heritage Centre, New Zealand.

== Specifications (1917 Model F) ==
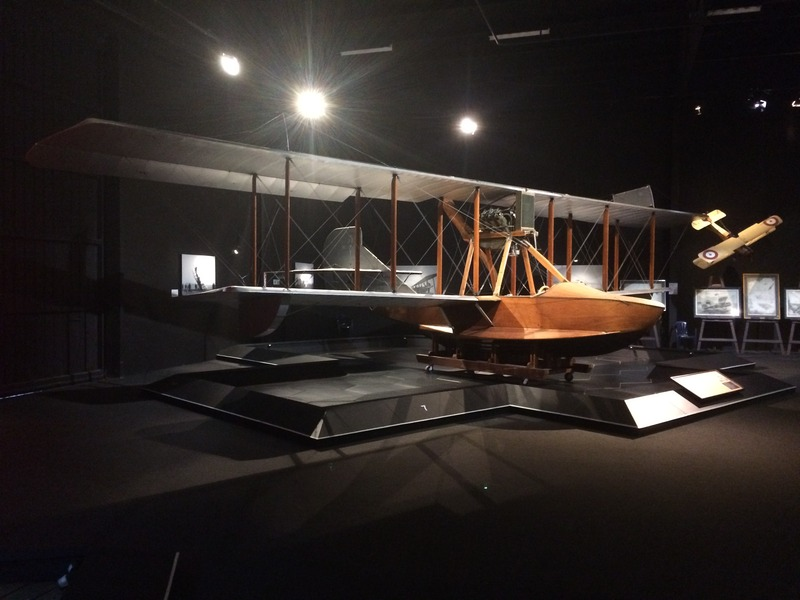
Curtiss MF NC903 on display at the Omaka Aviation Heritage Centre in 2017

Data from Curtiss Aircraft 1907–1947

General characteristics

- Crew: 2
- Capacity: 1 x stretcher in ambulance conversions
- Length: 27 ft 9 3/4 in (8.48 m)
- Wingspan: 45 ft 1 3/8 in (13.75 m)
- Height: 11 ft 2 13/16 in (3.42 m)
- Wing area: 387 sq ft (36.0 m^{2})
- Airfoil: USA 1
- Empty weight: 1,860 lb (844 kg)
- Gross weight: 2,460 lb (1,116 kg)
- Powerplant: 1 × Curtiss OXX-3 V-8 water-cooled piston engine, 100 hp (75 kW)
- Propellers: 2-bladed fixed-pitch pusher propeller

Performance

- Maximum speed: 69 mph (111 km/h, 60 kn)
- Endurance: 5 hours 30 minutes
- Service ceiling: 4,500 ft (1,400 m)
- Time to altitude: 2,300 ft (700 m) in 10 minutes

== See also ==
Related development

- Curtiss Model E
- America flying boat
- White and Thompson No. 3
- Curtiss Model K

== Bibliography ==
- Bowers, Peter M. (1979). Curtiss aircraft, 1907-1947. London: Putnam. ISBN 0-370-10029-8.
- Elliot, Bryn (March–April 1997). "Bears in the Air: The US Air Police Perspective". Air Enthusiast. No. 68. pp. 46–51. ISSN 0143-5450.
- Hagedorn, Dan (March–May 1992). "Curtiss Types in Latin America". Air Enthusiast. No. 45. pp. 61–77. ISSN 0143-5450.
