= List of tailless aircraft =

A tailless aircraft is one which has no separate horizontal stabilizer or control surface, either behind or in front of the main wing.

== List of aircraft ==
Type	Country	Class	Role	Date	Status	No.	Notes
Aériane Swift	US	Glider		1989		n/a	Foot-launched.
Aerospatiale-BAC Concorde	France & UK	Jet	Transport	1969	Production	20	SST.
AeroVironment Wasp III	US	Propeller	UAV	2007		n/a	Date of service entry with USAF
Akaflieg München Mü5 Wastl	Germany	Glider	Experimental	1929	Prototype	1	
Akaflieg Braunschweig SB-13 Arcus	Germany	Glider	Experimental	1988	Prototype	1	
Antonov E-153	USSR	Jet	Fighter	1947	Prototype	1	
Arup S-1	US	Propeller	Experimental	1932	Prototype	1	Rounded "heel wing".
Arup S-2	US	Propeller	Experimental	1933	Prototype	1	Rounded "heel wing".
Arup S-3	US	Propeller	Experimental	1934	Prototype	1	Rounded "heel wing".
Arup S-4	US	Propeller	Experimental	1935	Prototype	1	Rounded "heel wing".
Avro 707	UK	Jet	Experimental	1949	Prototype	5	Research for Avro Vulcan thick delta wing, 1/3 scale of Vulcan.
Avro CF-105 Arrow	Canada	Jet	Fighter	1958	Prototype	5	Supersonic.
Avro Vulcan	UK	Jet	Bomber	1952	Production	136	Subsonic.
BAC 221	UK	Jet	Experimental	1964	Prototype	2	Ogee wing. Modified version of the Fairey Delta 2.
BAE Systems Corax	UK	Jet	UAV	2004	Prototype	n/a	
Baynes Bat	UK	Propeller	Transport	1943	Prototype	1	
Boulton Paul P.111	UK	Jet	Experimental	1950	Prototype	1	Delta wing.
Cheranovskii BICh-26	USSR	Jet	Fighter	1948	Prototype	n/a	
Chizhevski BOK-5	USSR	Propeller	Private	1937	Prototype	1	
Briffaud GB-6	France	Propeller	Private	1955	Prototype	1	
Brochocki BKB-1	Canada	Glider	Private	1959	Prototype	1	
Charpentier C1	France	Propeller	Private	1934	Prototype	1	Trimotor.
Convair XF-92A	US	Jet	Fighter	1948	Prototype	1	
Convair F2Y Sea Dart	US	Jet	Fighter	1953	Prototype	5	Supersonic flying boat.
Convair F-102 Delta Dagger	US	Jet	Fighter	1953	Production	1,000	Supersonic.
Convair F-106 Delta Dart	US	Jet	Fighter	1956	Production	342	Supersonic.
Convair B-58 Hustler	US	Jet	Bomber	1956	Production	116	Supersonic.
Dassault MD 550 Mystère-Delta	France	Jet	Fighter	1955	Prototype	n/a	In modified form renamed the Mirage I.
Dassault Mirage III	France	Jet	Fighter	1956	Production	1,422	Supersonic jet. Many derivatives.
de Havilland DH.108 Swallow	UK	Jet	Experimental	1946	Prototype	3	
Douglas F4D Skyray	US	Jet	Fighter	1951	Operational	422	
Dunne D.1	UK	Glider	Experimental	1907	Prototype	1	Biplane. Failed to fly with pusher power module.
Dunne D.3	UK	Glider	Experimental	1908	Prototype	1	Biplane.
Dunne D.4	UK	Propeller	Experimental	1908	Prototype	1	Pusher biplane.
Dunne D.5	UK	Propeller	Experimental	1910	Prototype	1	Pusher biplane.
Dunne D.6	UK	Propeller	Experimental	1910	Prototype	1	Pusher. Failed.
Dunne D.7	UK	Propeller	Experimental	1911	Prototype	1	Pusher.
Dunne D.8	UK	Propeller	Experimental	1911	Operational	2	Pusher biplane.
EFW N-20	Switzerland	Jet	Experimental	1948	Prototype	3	N-20.01 gilder, .02 Arbalète and .03 Aiguillon.
Fairey Delta 2	UK	Jet	Experimental	1954	Prototype	2	First aircraft to exceed 1,000 miles per hour. Later modified as the BAC 221.
Fauvel AV.36	France	Glider	Private	1951	Homebuilt	100+	and others by Charles Fauvel.
FMA I.Ae 38	Argentina	Propeller	Transport	1960	Prototype	1	Designed by Reimar Horten.
General Aircraft GAL.56	UK	Glider	Experimental	1944	Prototype	4	
General Dynamics F-16XL	US	Jet	Experimental	1982	Prototype	2	Cranked delta wing.
Gotha Go 147	Germany	Propeller	Patrol	1936	Prototype	1	
Granger Archaeopteryx	UK	Propeller	Private	1930	Prototype	1	
Haig Minibat	US	Motor glider	Private	1979	Homebuilt	10+	
HAL Tejas	India	Jet	Fighter	2001	Production	33	
Handley Page HP.75 Manx	UK	Propeller	Experimental	1943	Prototype	1	Pusher.
Handley Page HP.115	UK	Jet	Experimental	1961	Prototype	1	Sharply swept delta wing.
Hawker P.1077	UK	Jet	Fighter	1949	Prototype	0	
Hawker Siddeley HS 138	UK	Jet	Strike fighter	1969	Prototype	0	Tailess VTOL delta wing.
Hispano HA P-300 (HA-23P)	Spain	Glider	Experimental	1959/60	Prototype	1	Developed into the Egyptian Helwan HA-300 tailed jet.
Hoffman Flying Wing	US	Propeller	Experimental	1934	Prototype	1	Arup-type "heel wing".
Horten Aircraft HX-2	Germany	Propeller	Experimental	2018	Prototype	n/a	
I.Ae. 34 Clen Antú	Argentina	Glider		1949		6	Designed by Reimar Horten and manufactured by the FMA.
I.Ae. 41 Urubú	Argentina	Glider		1953		5	Designed by Reimar Horten in Argentina.
Interstate XBDR	US	Jet	UAV	1944	Project	0	TV-guided cruise missile.
Kalinin K-12	USSR	Propeller	Experimental	1936	Prototype	1	
Kasper Bekas	US	Glider	Experimental	1968	Prototype	3	
Kimura/Kayaba HK-1	Japan	Glider	Experimental	1939	Prototype	1	
Kayaba Ku-2	Japan	Glider	Experimental	1940	Prototype	1	
Kayaba Ku-3	Japan	Glider	Experimental	1941	Prototype	1	
Kayaba Ku-4	Japan	Propeller	Experimental	1941	Project	0	Cancelled before it flew.
Kollman Raptor	US			1994		n/a	
Lippisch delta	Germany	Propeller	Experimental	1931-45	Prototype	n/a	Several types.
Lockheed A-12	US	Jet	Reconnaissance	1962	Production	n/a	Mach 3 capability. Long forward-fuselage chines. Several derivatives, especially the SR-71 Blackbird.
Lockheed Martin X-44 MANTA	US	Jet	Experimental	2000	Project	0	Multi-Axis No-Tail Aircraft.
Marske Monarch	US	Glider	Experimental	1974	Homebuilt	n/a	
Marske Pioneer	US	Glider	Experimental	1968	Homebuilt	17	One example built of the Pioneer 1, at least 16 of the Pioneer II.
Marske XM-1	US	Glider	Experimental	1957	Prototype	1	
Messerschmitt Me 163 Komet	Germany	Rocket	Fighter	1941	Production	~370	
Mitchell U-2 Superwing	US	Glider	Experimental	1980	Homebuilt	n/a	
John K. Moody/Larry Mauro Easy Riser	US	Propeller	Experimental	1975		n/a	
Napier tailless fighter	UK	Propeller	Experimental	1946	Prototype	0	Concept using Sabre E.122 3350 hp engine with contra-rotating propellers.
Nike PUL 9	Germany	Propeller	Experimental	1990	Prototype	1	
Northrop X-4 Bantam	US	Jet	Fighter	1948	Prototype	2	
Northrop Grumman RQ-180	US	Jet	UAV	2015	Prototype	n/a	Stealth surveillance aircraft.
University of Pretoria Exulans	South Africa	Glider	Experimental	1989	Prototype	2	Exulans I and II. "Gull" variable-sweep wing.
Saab 35 Draken	Sweden	Jet	Fighter	1955	Production	651	Supersonic jet. Double-delta planform.
Short SB.1	UK	Glider	Experimental	1951	Prototype	1	Aero-isoclinic wing.
Short SB.4 Sherpa	UK	Jet	Experimental	1953	Prototype	1	Aero-isoclinic wing.
Soldenhof So.A	Switzerland	Propeller	Private	1930	Prototype	1	Pusher.
Sypaq Corvo Precision Payload Delivery System	Australia	Propeller	UAV	2019	Operational	n/a	Electric powered stealth waxed cardboard 2m (6.6 ft) wingspan surveillance aircraft.
Tupolev Tu-144	USSR	Jet	Transport	1968	Operational	16	SST.
Vought F7U Cutlass	US	Jet	Multirole Fighter	1948	Operational	320	
Westland-Hill Pterodactyl	UK	Propeller	Experimental	1920s-1930s	Prototype	3	Series of types, 3 actually built.
Weltensegler	Germany	Glider	Private	1921	Prototype	1	
Chengdu J-36	China	Jet	Fighter	2024	Prototype	3	
Shenyang J-50	China	Jet	Fighter	2024	Prototype	1	

== See also ==
- Blended wing body
- Flying wing
