= List of experimental aircraft =

List of aircraft produced by a number of countries to test new concepts and technology

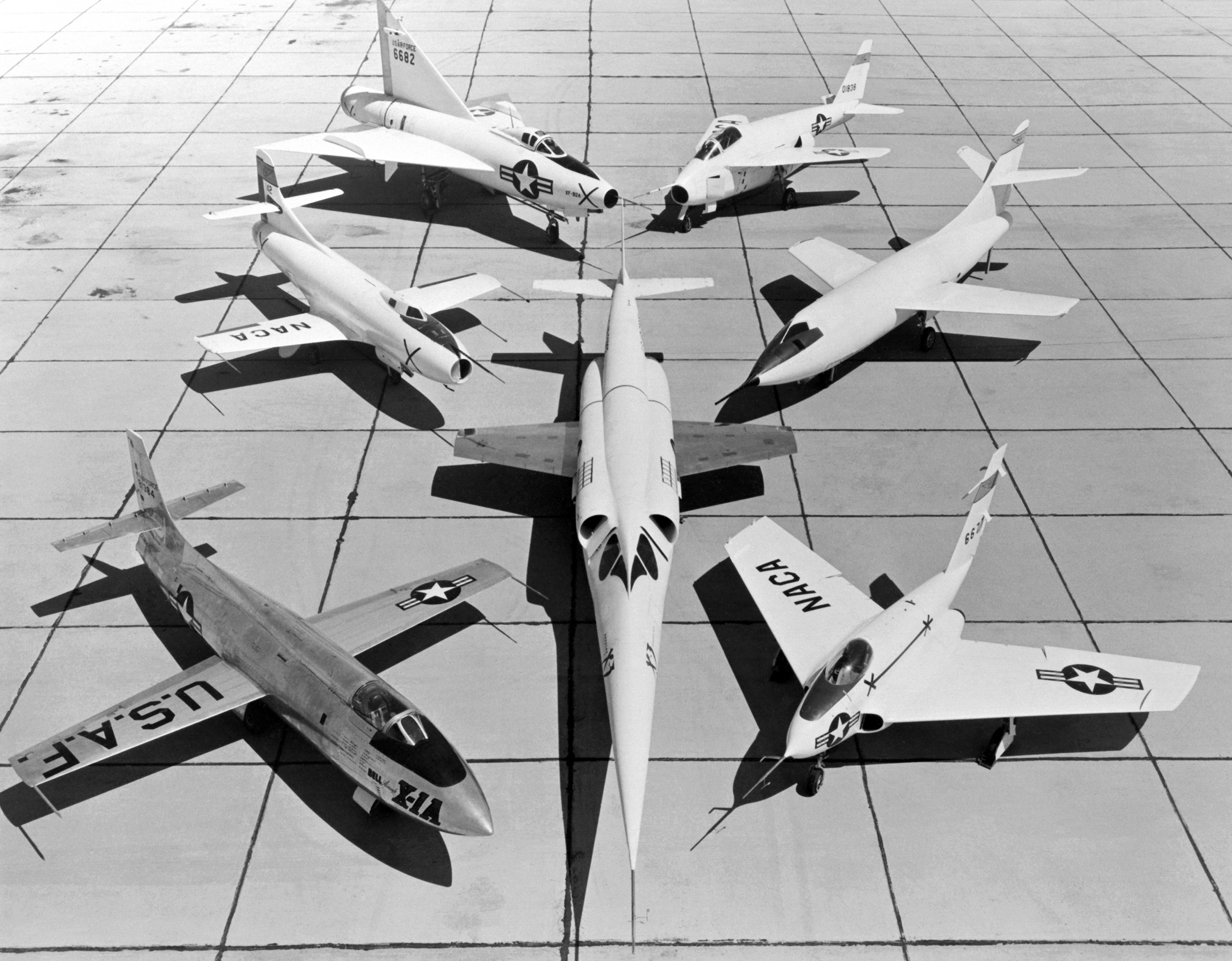
A group of 1950s NACA research aircraft

As used here, an experimental or research and development aircraft, sometimes also called an X-plane, is one which is designed or substantially adapted to investigate novel flight technologies.

== Argentina ==
- FMA I.Ae. 37 glider – testbed for production fighter

== Australia ==
- GAF Pika – manned test craft for drone program

== Brazil ==
- Baumgartl PB-60 – towed experimental rotor kite

== Canada ==
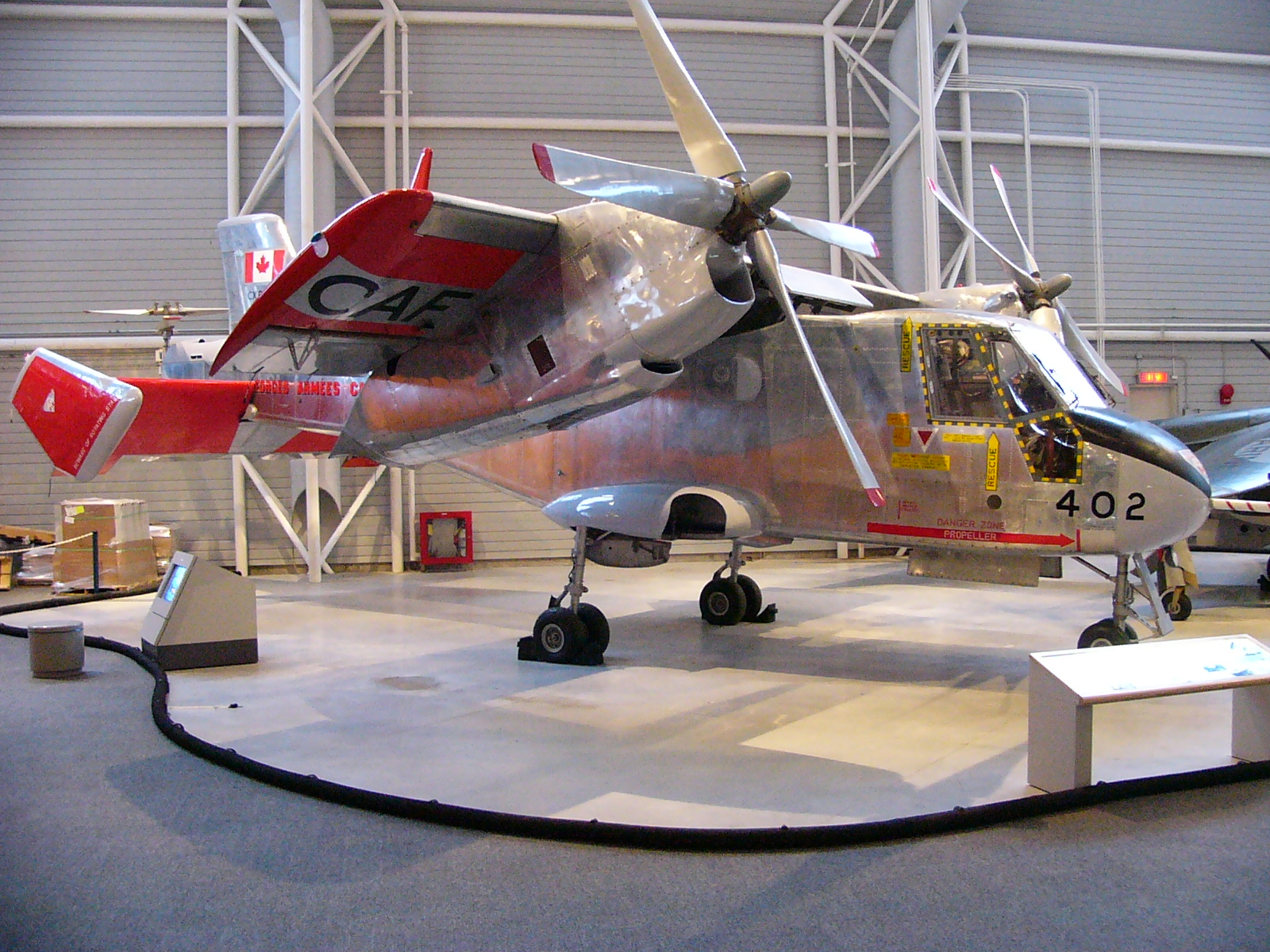
Canadair CL-84 Dynavert tilt-wing VTOL research aircraft

- AEA Silver Dart (1909) – First aircraft to fly in Canada
- Avro Canada Avrocar – Ducted fan VTOL
- Birdman Project 102 –
- Canadair CL-52 – jet engine testbed (converted Boeing B-47)
- Canadair CL-84 Dynavert – tilt-wing VTOL
- de Havilland Canada C-8A – Quiet Short-Haul Research Aircraft
- de Havilland Canada C-8A – Air-Cushion Landing System
- de Havilland Canada C-8A – Augmentor Wing
- Marsden Gemini – variable-geometry glider
- NRC tailless glider – tailless flying wing
- UTIAS Ornithopter No.1

== France ==
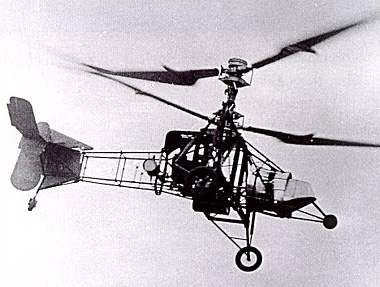
Breguet-Dorand Gyroplane Laboratoire

- Aérocentre NC.130 1939 – High-altitude flight
- Aérospatiale Ludion 1967 – Thrust vectored rocket VTOL
- Arsenal-Delanne 10 – Tandem wing
- Arsenal VG 70 – High speed research
- Arsenal O.101 – Aerodynamic research
- Arsenal 2301/SFECMAS 2301 and SFECMAS 1301 – Supersonic research glider
- Breguet-Dorand Gyroplane Laboratoire – Experimental helicopter
- Breguet-Richet Gyroplane – Experimental helicopter
- Breguet Laboratoire Eiffel – Monoplane testbed
- Dassault Balzac V – VTOL testbed
- Dassault Mirage IIIV – VTOL testbed
- Dassault Milan – Canard research
- Dassault Mirage G – Variable geometry
- Dassault LOGIDUC – Unmanned combat aerial vehicle UCAV development
- Dassault nEUROn – UCAV technology demonstrator
- Farman F.1010 – Heavy cannon flight testing
- Farman F.1020 – Semi-circular wing
- Fouga Gemeaux – Engine testbed
- Gastambide-Levavasseur Variable Surface Aircraft – Variable chord wing testbed
- Gérin Varivol – Variable chord wing testbed

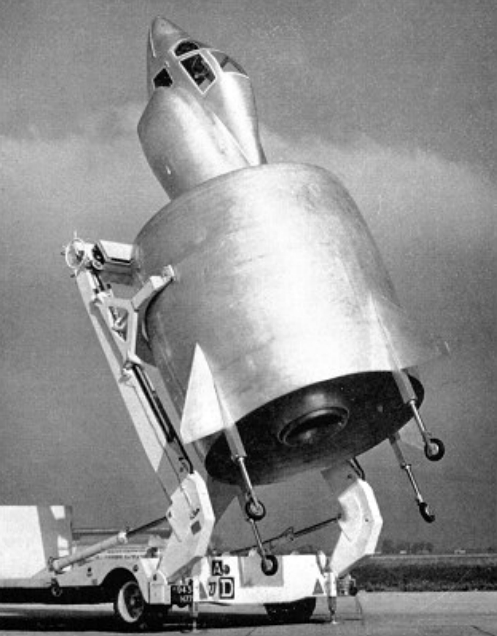
SNECMA Coléoptère experimental tailsitter in 1959

- Hanriot HD.28 – tested a Vee tail
- Hurel-Dubois HD.10 – Very high aspect ratio wings
- Leduc 0.10 – Ramjet
- Leduc 0.21 – Ramjet
- Makhonine Mak-10 – Variable span wing
- Messier Monoplace Laboratorie – Retractable bicycle undercarriage testbed.
- Nord 500 – VTOL tilt ducted fan research aircraft
- Nord 1402/1405 Gerfaut – Delta wing research aircraft
- Nord 1500 Griffon – Ramjet
- Nord 1601 – Swept wing research aircraft
- Payen PA-22 – Tandem delta/normal wings
- Payen Pa 49 – Tandem delta/normal wings
- Potez-CAMS 160 – 5/13th scale six engine aerodynamic testbed for development of CAMS 161
- Robin X4 – Materials and configuration testbed
- SNECMA Atar Volant – Vertical lift jet
- SNECMA Coléoptère – Vertical lift annular wing
- Sud Est SE-1210 scale aerodynamic testbed for SE-1200 transatlantic flying boat
- Sud-Ouest Ariel – Tip-jet rotor helicopter
- Sud-Ouest Farfadet – Convertiplane
- Sud-Ouest Triton – First French jet aircraft

== Germany ==
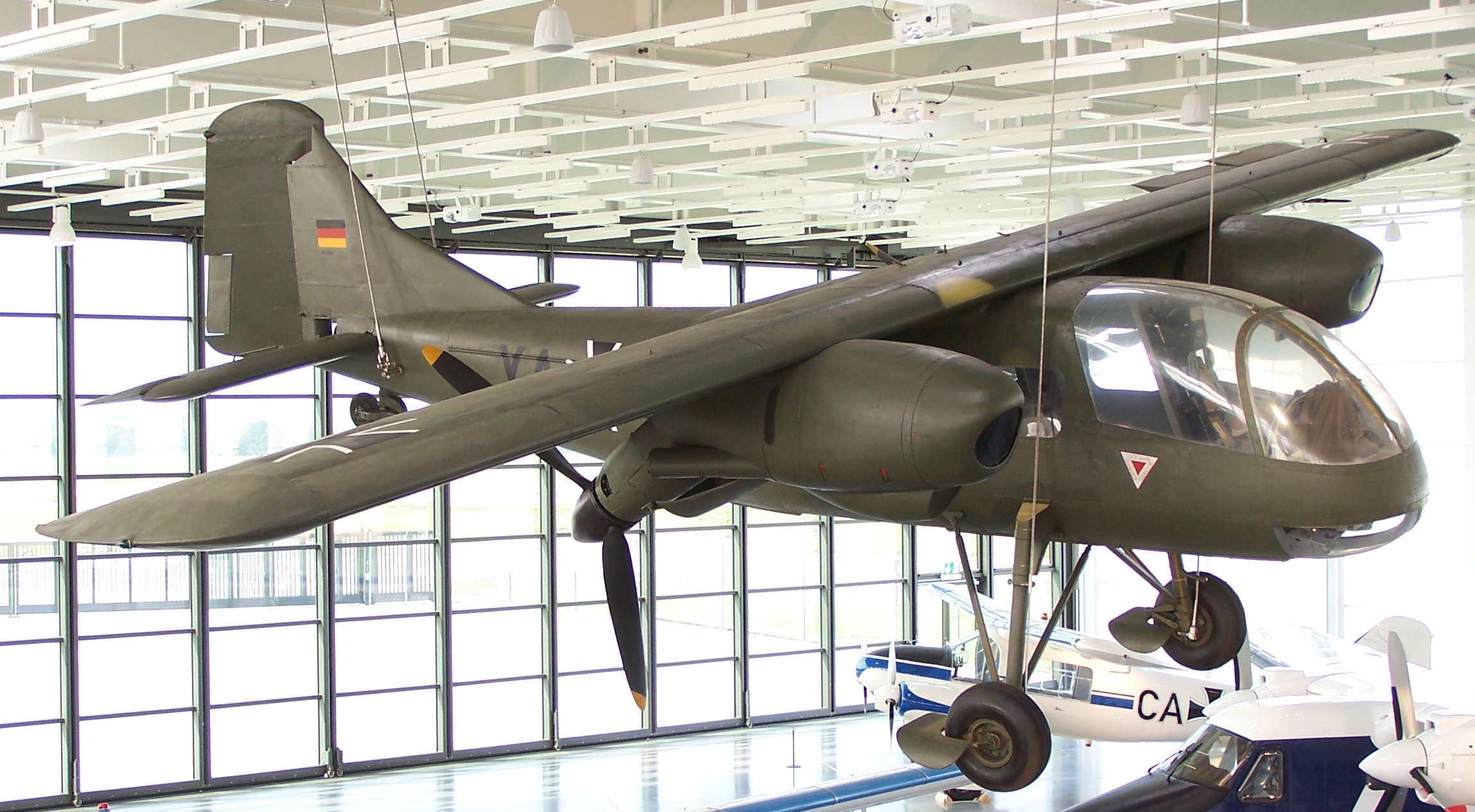
Dornier Do 29 tilt rotor STOL

- Akaflieg Berlin B 9 1943. – Prone pilot
- Albatros L.81 – Elektron metal structure testbed
- AVA AF 1 – Augumented lift
- DFS 194 1940 – Tailless rocket aircraft used in development of Me 163
- DFS 346 1948 – Supersonic reconnaissance aircraft used for research
- Dassault/Dornier Alpha Jet TransSonische Tragflügel (TST) – Transonic supercritical wing research
- Dornier Do 29 – Tilt rotor STOL

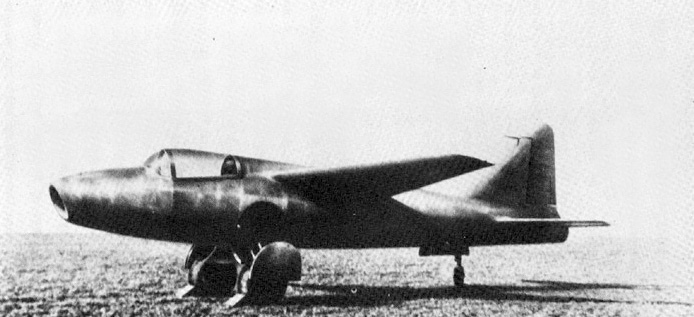
Heinkel He 178 pioneering turbojet-powered aircraft

- Dornier Do 31 – Experimental VTOL transport
- EWR VJ 101 – Experimental tiltjet VTOL fighter
- Fieseler Fi 158 – Testbed for radio control system
- Flettner airplane – Magnus effect test vehicle
- Flettner Fl 185 – Gyrodyne
- Focke-Wulf F 19 – Multi-engined canard demonstrator
- Fokker V.1 – Structures and aerodynamics testbed
- Göppingen Gö 8 – Development aircraft for Do 214
- Göppingen Gö 9 – Pusher (behind tail) aerodynamic testbed for Dornier Do 335 development
- Gotha Go 147 – Tailless research aircraft

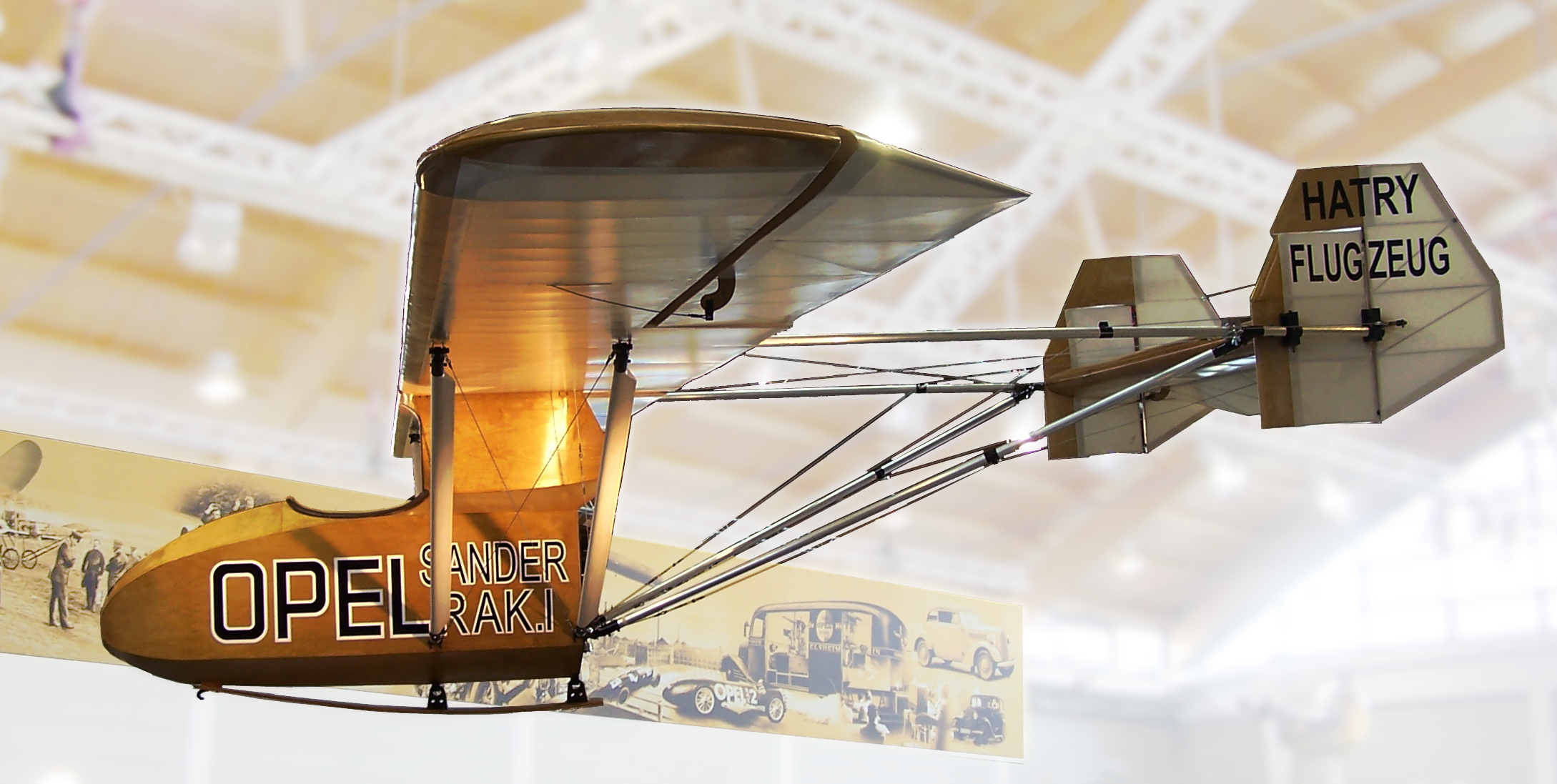
Opel RAK.1 rocket engine research aircraft

- Heinkel He 119 – High-performance research aircraft
- Heinkel He 176 – Rocket research aircraft
- Heinkel He 178 – Jet engine research aircraft
- Horten H.III – Flying wing
- Horten H.IV – Flying wing
- Horten Ho VI – Flying wing
- Junkers J 1 – Pioneering all-metal cantilever monoplane (1915)
- Junkers EF 61 – Pressurization
- Junkers Ju 49 – High-altitude test aircraft
- Lippisch Delta IV – Delta wing
- Lippisch DM-1 1944 – Delta wing glider
- Lippisch Ente – Rocket-powered canard technology demonstrator
- Lippisch P.13a – Coal-powered delta wing
- Messerschmitt Me P.1101 – Variable geometry (swing-wing) jet
- Opel RAK.1 – Rocket propulsion technology demonstrator
- RFB X-113 – Wing in ground effect vehicle
- RFB X-114 – Wing in ground effect vehicle
- Sack AS-6 – Disk wing technology demonstrator
- Schmeidler SN.2 – Wing flaps
- VFW VAK 191B – VTOL fighter
- Zeppelin-Lindau V I – All-metal stressed skin construction

== Italy ==
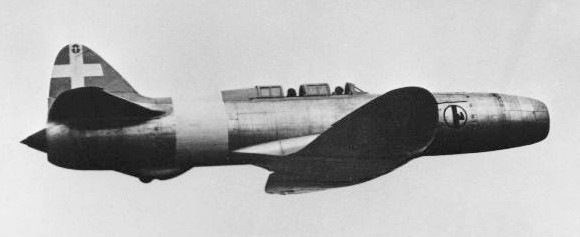
Caproni-Campini N.1/CC.2 experimental motorjet and second jet aircraft to fly

- Ambrosini Sagittario 1953 – Swept wing research aircraft
- Bossi-Bonomi Pedaliante 1936 – Human-powered aircraft
- Caproni Campini N.1 1940 – Jet engine research
- Jona J-6 – Tilting wing stabilisation system
- Lualdi-Tassotti ES 53 – Gyro stabilized helicopter
- Piaggio P.111 – High-altitude research
- S.C.A. SS.2 – Experimental canard
- S.C.A. SS.3 Anitra – Experimental canard
- Stipa-Caproni – Ducted prop research
- Sandro Simoncini - Experimental helicopter

== Poland ==
- Flugtechnische Fertigungsgemeinschaft Prag FGP 227 – Scale proof of concept for German BV 238
- Lala-1 – Jet biplane testbed for PZL M-15 Belphegor

== Japan ==
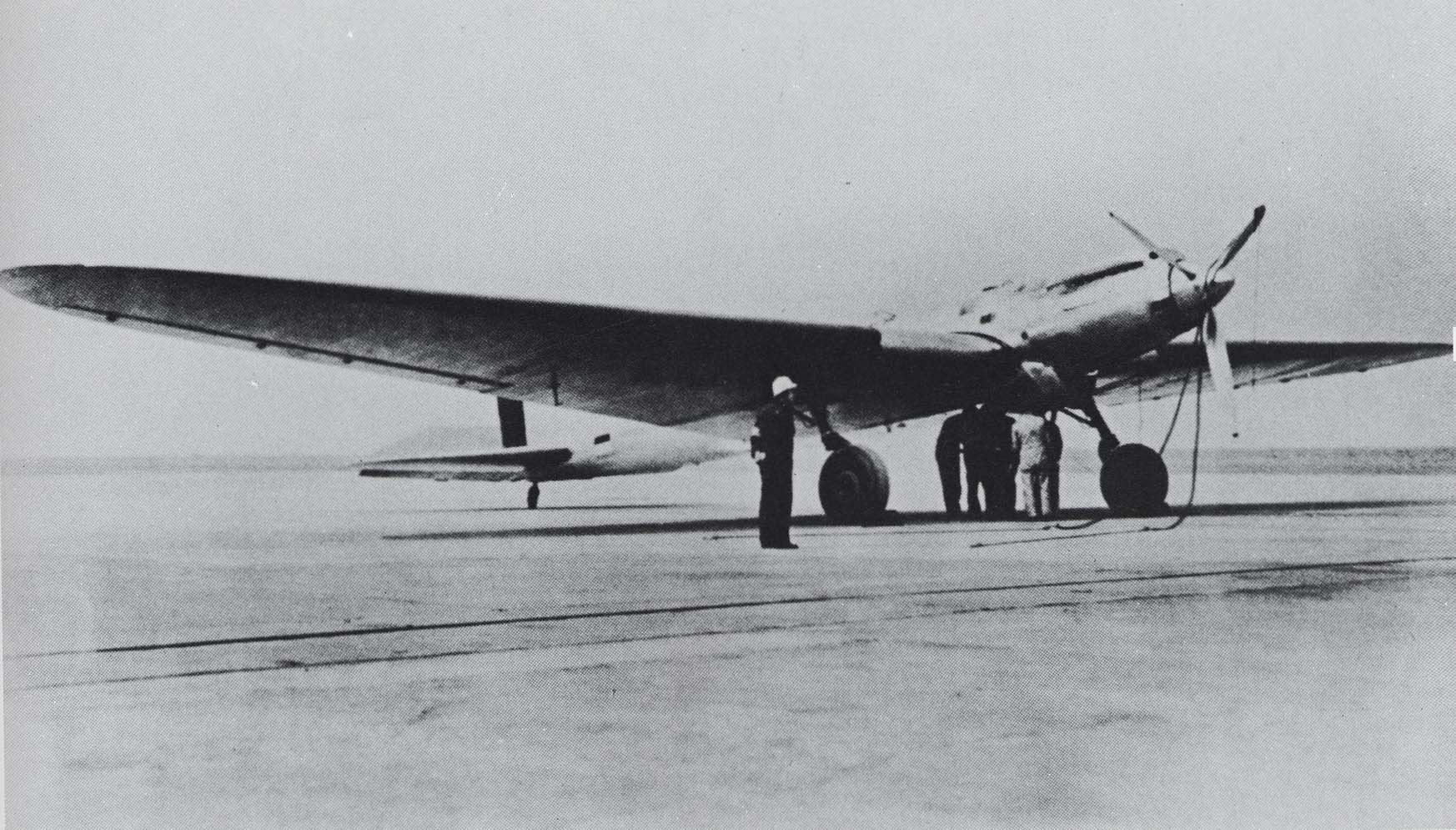
Gasuden Koken

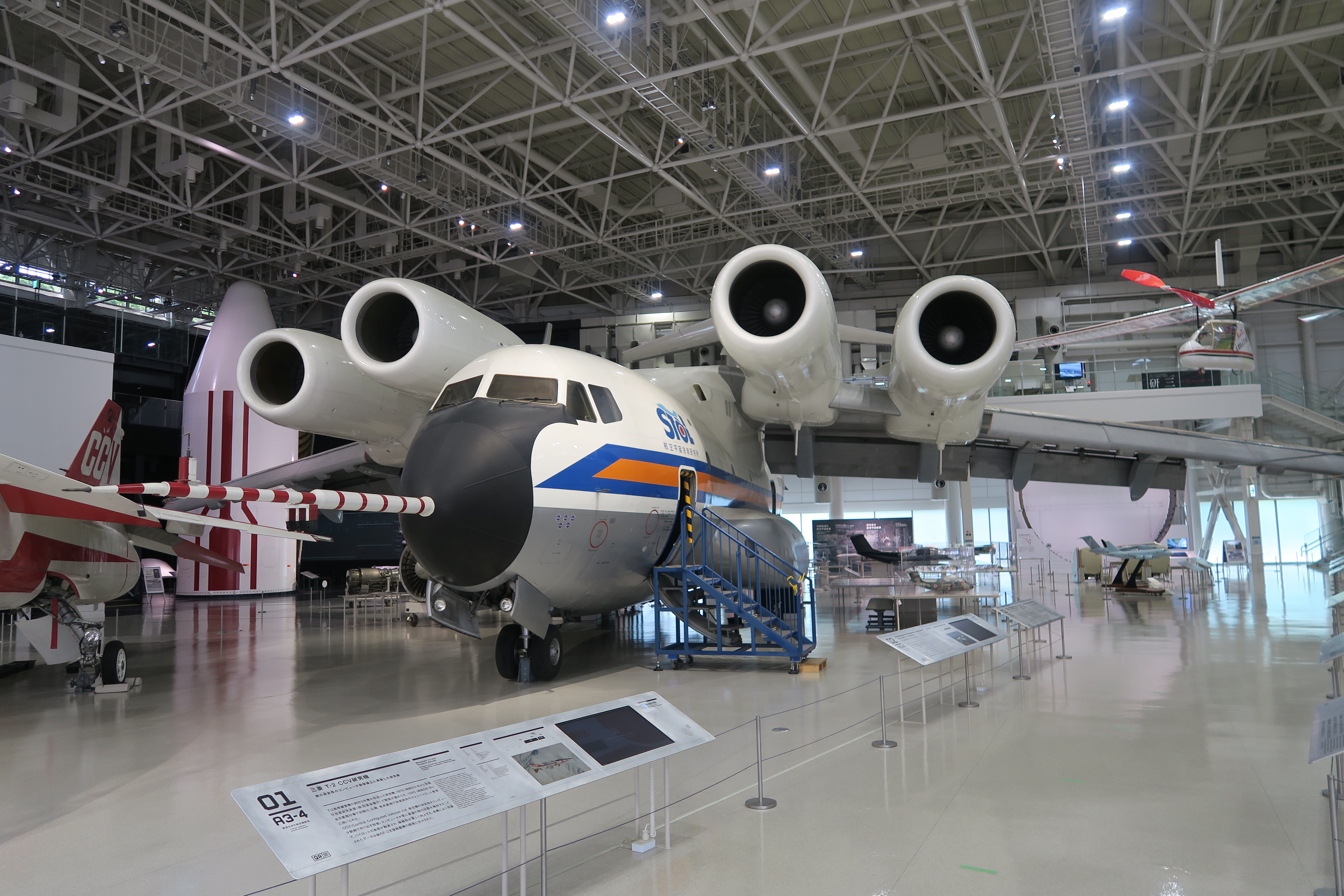
- NAL Asuka
  Gasuden Koken 1937 – Long range experimental aircraft
- Honda MH02 1993 – Over wing engines, forward swept wing
- Kawasaki Ki-78 1942 – High speed research aircraft
- Kayaba Ku-2 1940 – Tailless glider
- Kayaba Ku-3 – Tailless glider
- Kayaba Ku-4 – Tailless research aircraft
- Kimura HK-1 – Tailless glider
- Mitsubishi RP-1 – Experimental helicopter
- MXY-6 – Canard scale testbed for Kyushu J7W
- X1G – High-lift device based on Saab 91 Safir
- National Aerospace Laboratory (NAL) Asuka – STOL
- Shin Meiwa UF-XS – Proof of concept demonstrator for Shin Meiwa US-1A
- Mitsubishi T-2CCV - Experimental aircraft for CCV technology
- Mitsubishi X-2 Shinshin – Advanced stealth technology demonstrator

== Russia/Soviet Union ==
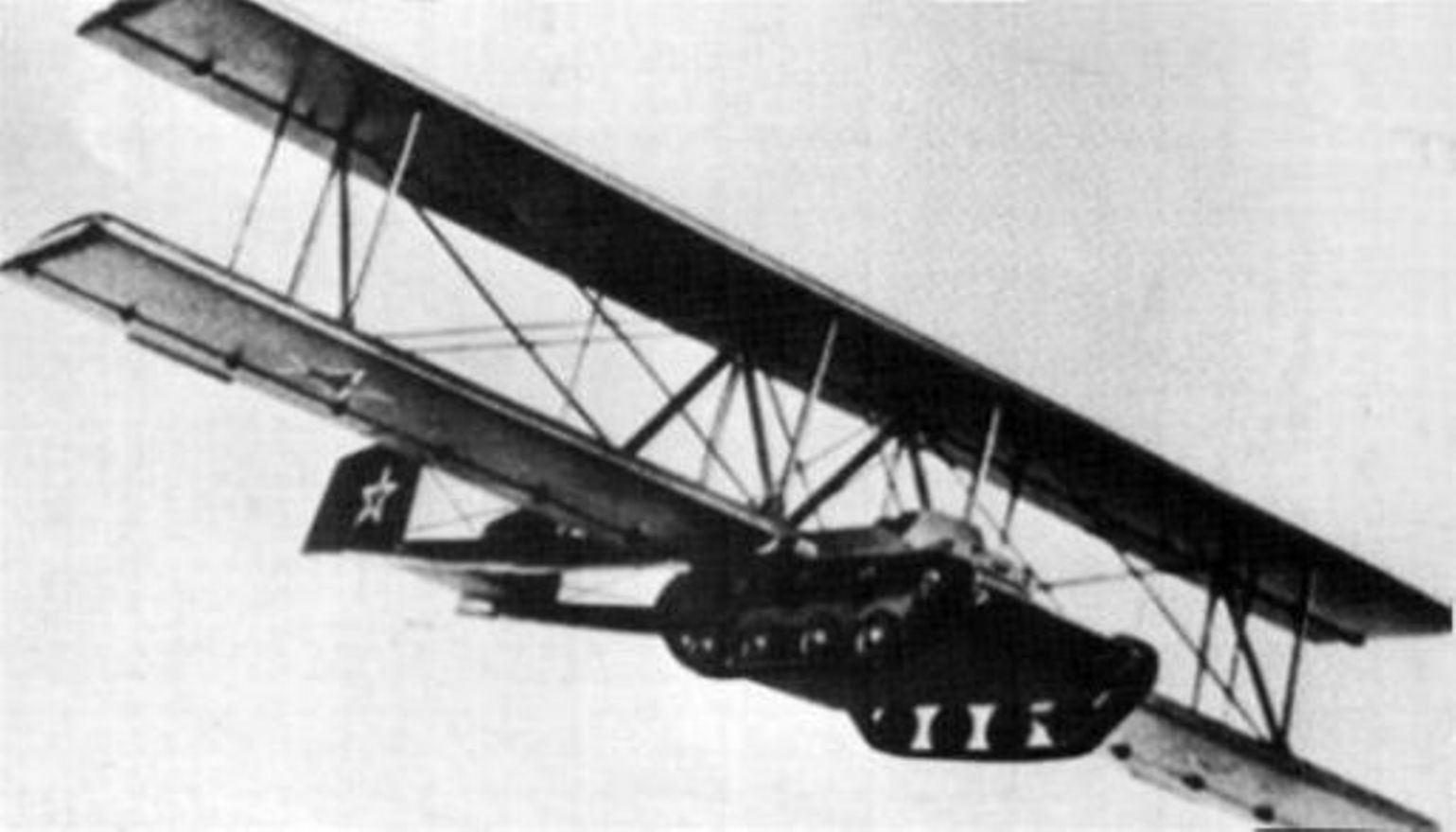
Antonov A-40 tank glider

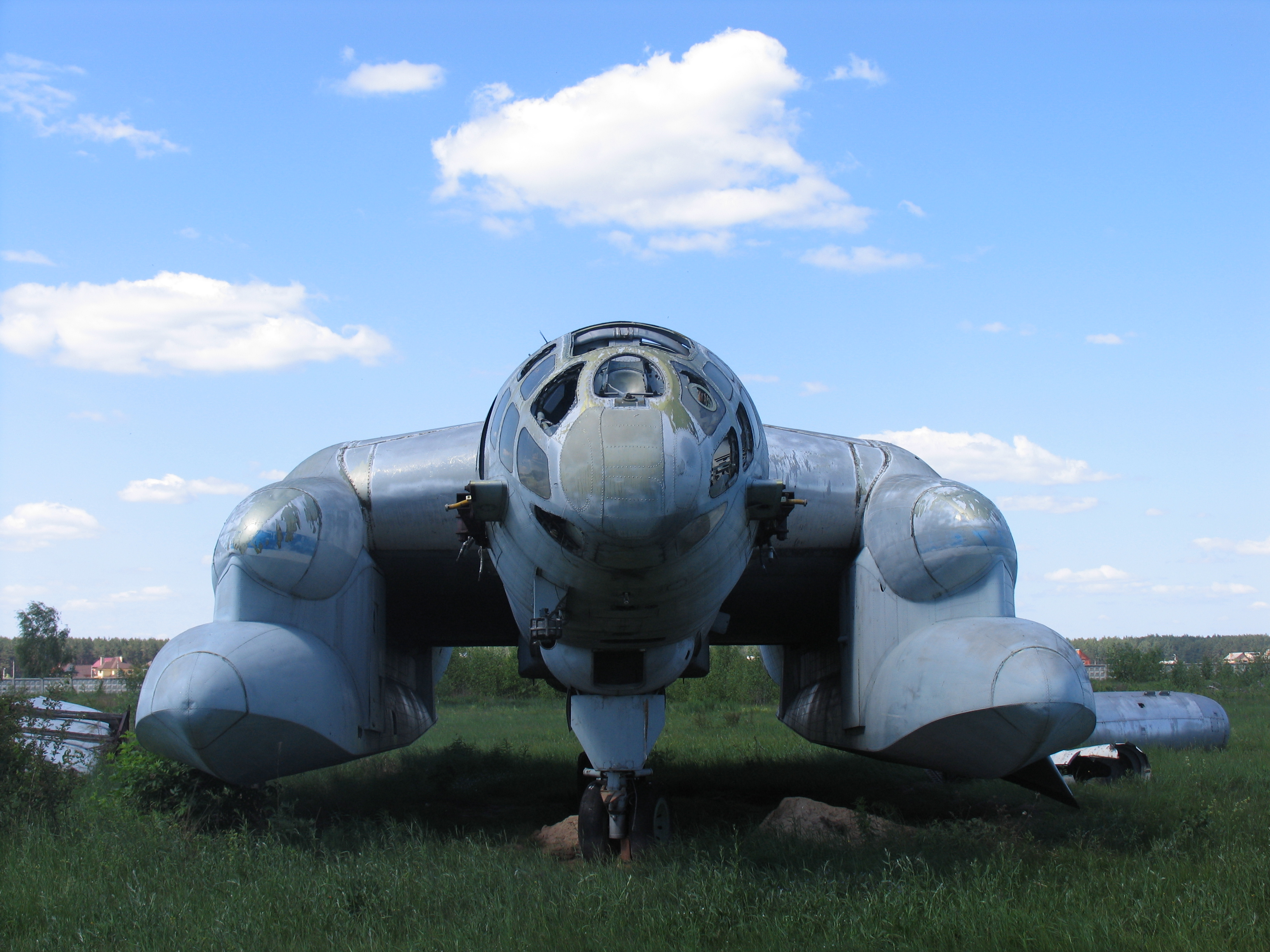
Bartini Beriev VVA-14 Ekranoplan

- Alexeyev – Ekranoplans
- Antonov A-40 1942 – Tank glider
- Antonov 181 – Blown channel wing demonstrator
- Bartini Beriev VVA-14 1972 – Ekranoplan ground effect vehicle
- Bartini Stal-6 – High speed aircraft
- Chyeranovskii BICh-3 – Tailless delta research aircraft
- Chyeranovskii BICh-11 – Flying wing to test wingtip rudders
- Chyeranovskii BICh-16 – Human-powered ornithopter
- Chyeranovskii BICh-18 – Human-powered ornithopter
- Chizhevski BOK-1 – High-altitude research aircraft
- Chizhevski BOK-5 – Tailless research aircraft
- Grigorovich I-Z – Recoilless cannon evaluation
- Grushin Octyabrenok – Tandem wing
- Ilyushin Il-76LL – Engine testbeds (5)
- Kozlov PS – Visibility (covered in transparent material)
- MAI EMAI – Magnesium construction
- Mikoyan-Gurevich MiG-8 Utka – Pusher canard proof of concept (1945)
- Mikoyan-Gurevich MiG-105 – Lifting body
- Mikoyan Project 1.44 – Technology demonstrator
- Mikoyan-Gurevich N – Mixed propulsion system

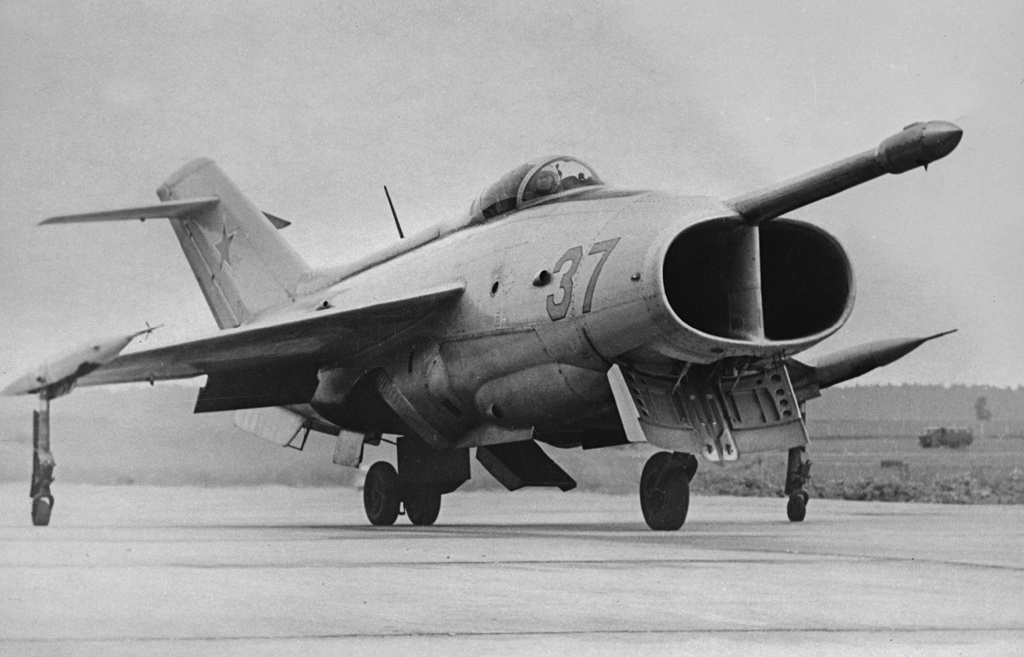
Yakovlev Yak-36 VTOL research vehicle

- Moskalyev SAM-9 Strela – Delta wing
- NIAI RK – Telescopic wings
- NIAI RK-I – Telescopic wings
- Nikitin PSN-2 – Glider bombers
- Sukhanov Diskoplan – Disk wings
- Sukhoi T-10 – Technology demonstrator
- Sukhoi T-58VD – VTOL research aircraft
- Sukhoi Su-47 – Technology demonstrator
- Thermoplan – Heavy lift lenticular-shaped hybrid airship technology demonstrator
- Tsybin LL – Forward swept wing
- Tsybin NM-1 – Proof of concept
- Tupolev Tu-95LAL – Nuclear-powered aircraft
- Ushakov – Flying submarines
- Yakovlev Yak-36 – VTOL technology demonstrator
- Yakovlev Yak-42LL – Progress D-236 propfan engine testbed
- Yakovlev Yak-1000 – Supersonic technology demonstrator
- Zveno project – Parasite fighters

== Spain ==
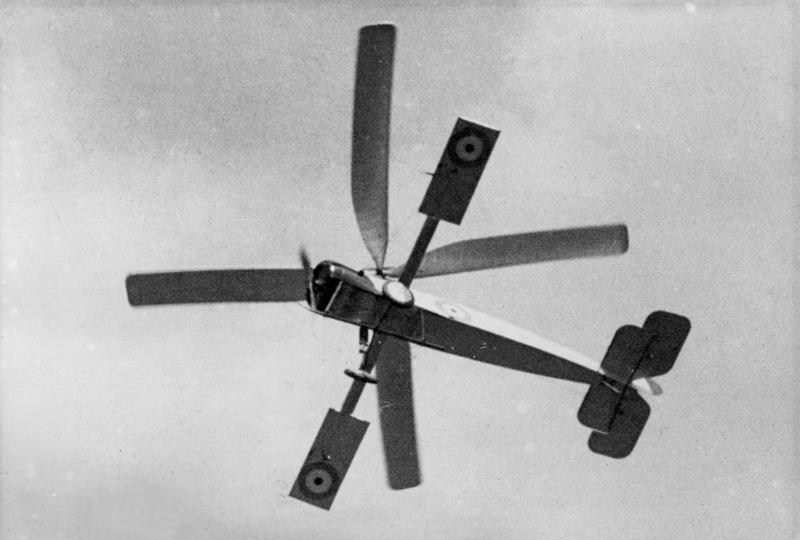
Cierva C.6 autogiro

- Cierva C.4 1923 – Experimental autogyro, first to fly
- Cierva C.6 1924 – Experimental autogyro

== Sweden ==
- Saab 201 - Aerodynamic testbed for Saab 29 Tunnan
- Saab 202 – Aerodynamic testbed for Saab 32 Lansen
- Saab 210 1952 – Aerodynamic testbed for double delta concept for Saab 35 Draken

== Switzerland ==
- Solar Impulse Project – Solar power technology demonstrator

== United Kingdom ==
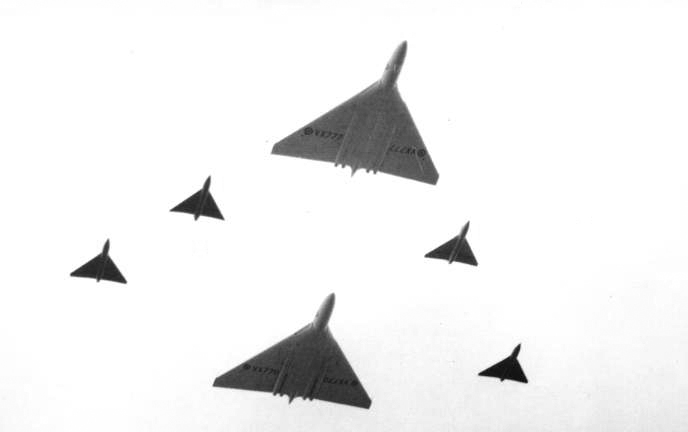
Avro 707 research aircraft in formation with Avro Vulcan bomber prototypes

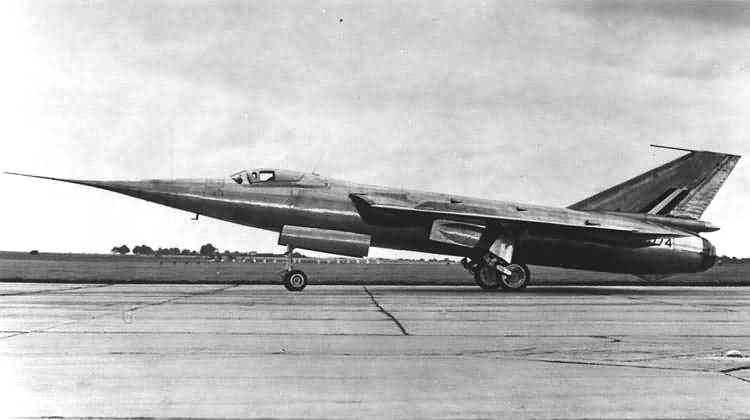
Fairey Delta 2 research aircraft

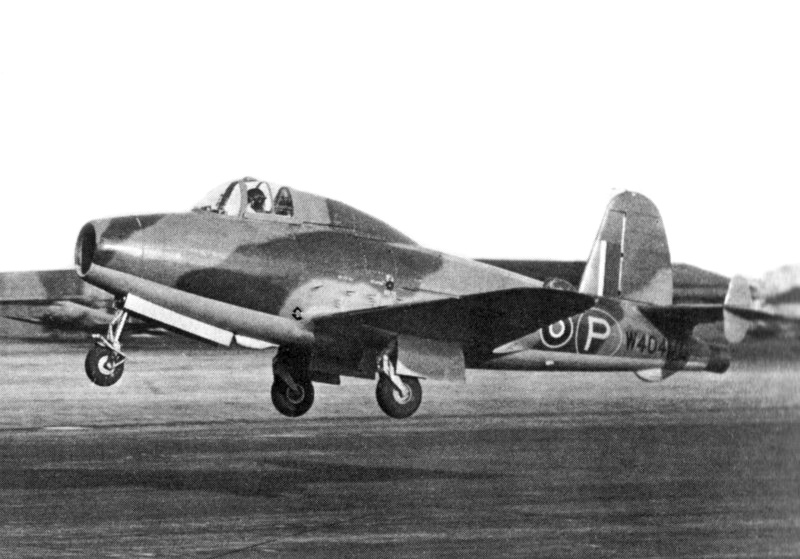
Gloster E.28/39 jet engine research aircraft

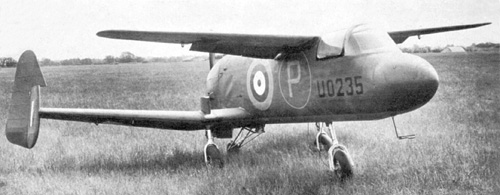
Miles M.35 Libellula canard research aircraft

- Armstrong Whitworth Ape 1926 – Variable configuration aerodynamic test vehicle
- Armstrong Whitworth A.W.52 1947 – Jet powered flying wing
- Avro 707 1949 – Aerodynamic proof of concept for Avro Vulcan delta wing bomber
- Avro Ashton – Jet engine research vehicle based on Avro Tudor
- BAC 221 – High speed delta wing research
- Baynes Bat – Experimental tailless glider
- Blackburn B-20 – Retractable hull seaplane
- Boulton Paul P.6 – Wing research
- Boulton Paul P.92 – Half-scale proof of concept for turret fighter
- Boulton Paul P.111 – Delta-wing research aircraft
- Boulton Paul P.120 – Delta-wing research aircraft
- Bristol 138 – High-altitude research aircraft
- Bristol 188 – High speed flight research
- British Aerospace EAP – Technology demonstrator
- Cierva W.9 – Experimental helicopter with anti-torque jet efflux
- de Havilland DH 108 Swallow – Swept wing tailless transsonic research aircraft
- English Electric P.1A – Supersonic research aircraft
- modified Fairey Battle – Engine testbed for Rolls-Royce Exe, Fairey Prince (H-16) and Napier Dagger.
- Fairey Delta 1 – Delta-wing research aircraft
- Fairey Delta 2 – Delta-wing research aircraft
- Fairey Jet Gyrodyne – Jet-powered rotor technology demonstrator
- Folland Fo.108 – Engine test bed
- General Aircraft GAL.56 – Tailless swept wing glider
- Gloster E.28/39 – Jet engine research
- Gloster Meteor F8 "Prone Pilot" – Prone position flight control research
- Gloster Trent Meteor – Turboprop propulsion
- Hafner A.R.III Gyroplane – Experimental autogyro
- Handley Page H.P.17 – Aerodynamic slot research
- Handley Page H.P.20 – Aerodynamic slot research
- Handley Page H.P.75 Manx – Tailless flight research
- Handley Page HP.88 – Handley Page Victor aerodynamic testbed
- Handley Page HP.115 – Low speed delta-wing research
- Hawker P.1052 – Swept wing testbed
- Hawker P.1072 – Armstrong Siddeley Snarler rocket booster testbed
- Hawker P.1127 – V/STOL technology demonstrator, led to Hawker Harrier
- Hillson Bi-mono – Slip-wing research
- Hunting H.126 – Blown flap research
- Miles M.3E Gillette Falcon – High speed flight research
- Miles M.30 – Blended wing body design
- Miles M.35 Libellula – Tandem-wing fighter testbed
- Miles M.39B Libellula – Tandem-wing research
- Miles M.52 – Supersonic flight research
- Parnall Parasol – Wing pressure and aileron testing
- Parnall Peto – Experimental submarine-launched aircraft
- Parnall Prawn – Flying boat testing buried engine with variable-angle thrust line
- Reid and Sigrist R.S.4 Bobsleigh – Prone-pilot research
- Rolls-Royce Thrust Measuring Rig – Low speed VTOL control test rig

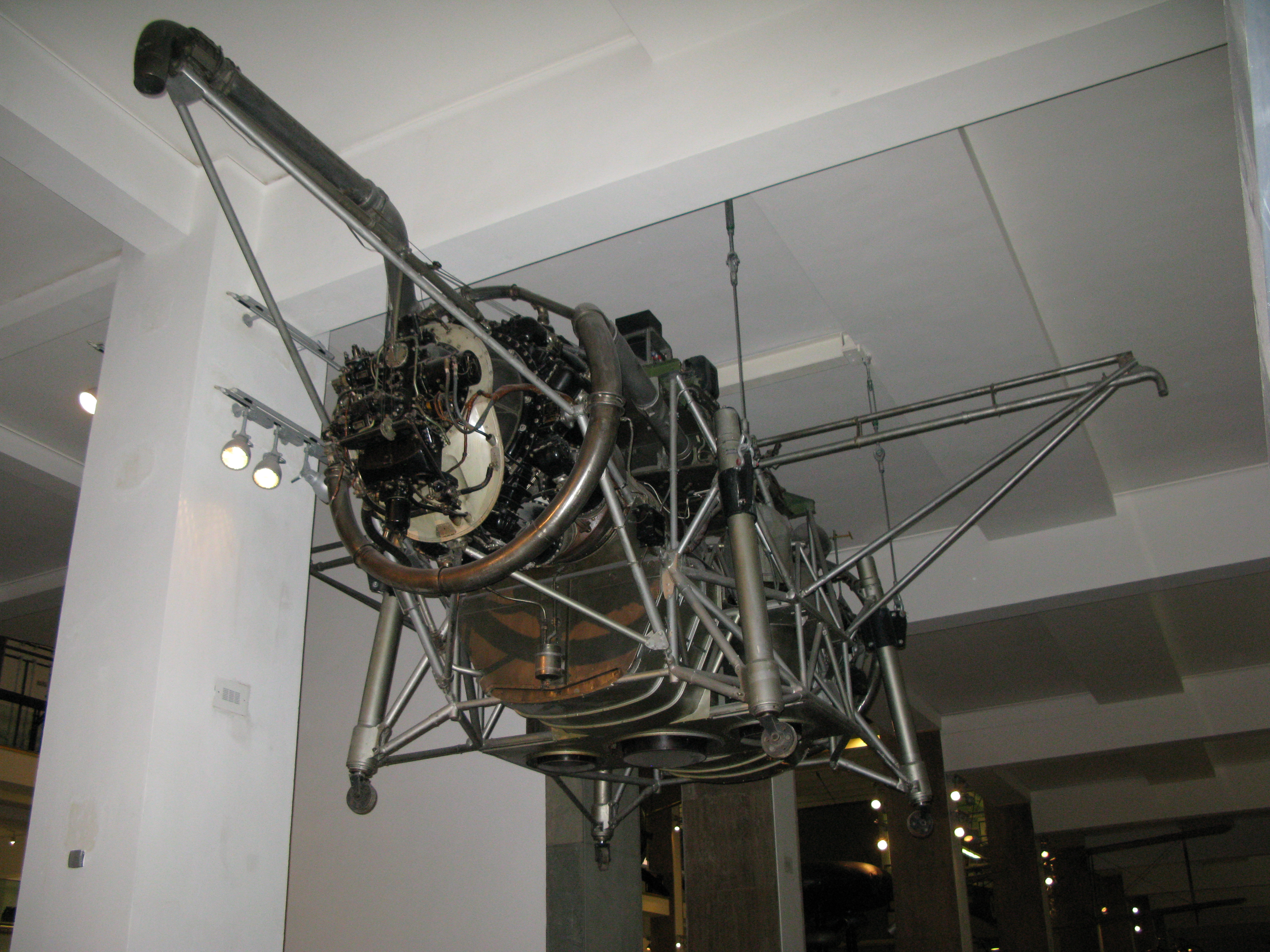
Rolls-Royce thrust measuring rig VTOL testbed

- Saro Shrimp – Experimental half-scale flying boat for development of cancelled Saunders-Roe S.38
- Saunders-Roe SR.53 – Mixed rocket/jet propulsion development aircraft for cancelled Saunders-Roe SR.177
- Short Cockle – Metal construction technology demonstrator for flying boats
- Short Mussel – Testing metal construction techniques for aircraft floats
- Short S.6 Sturgeon – Tested aluminium construction techniques for aircraft
- Short S.31 – Half-scale model for Short Stirling development
- Short SB.1 – Tailless glider for isoclinic wing research
- Short SB.4 Sherpa – Powered isoclinic wing research
- Short SB.5 – English Electric Lightning wing research
- Short SC.1 – VTOL research
- Short Silver Streak – Stressed skin construction, developed into Short Springbok
- Supermarine 508 – Development aircraft with vee tail
- Supermarine 525 – Swept wing development aircraft for Supermarine Scimitar program
- Vickers Type 618 Nene-Viking – Jet engine testbed
- Vickers Type 470 and Type 486 Wellington – Whittle jet engine testbeds
- Vickers Type 602 Wellington Mark X – Rolls-Royce Dart turboprop testbed
- Westland-Hill Pterodactyl – Tailless monoplane testbeds
- Youngman-Baynes High Lift – Youngman flap testbed

== United States ==
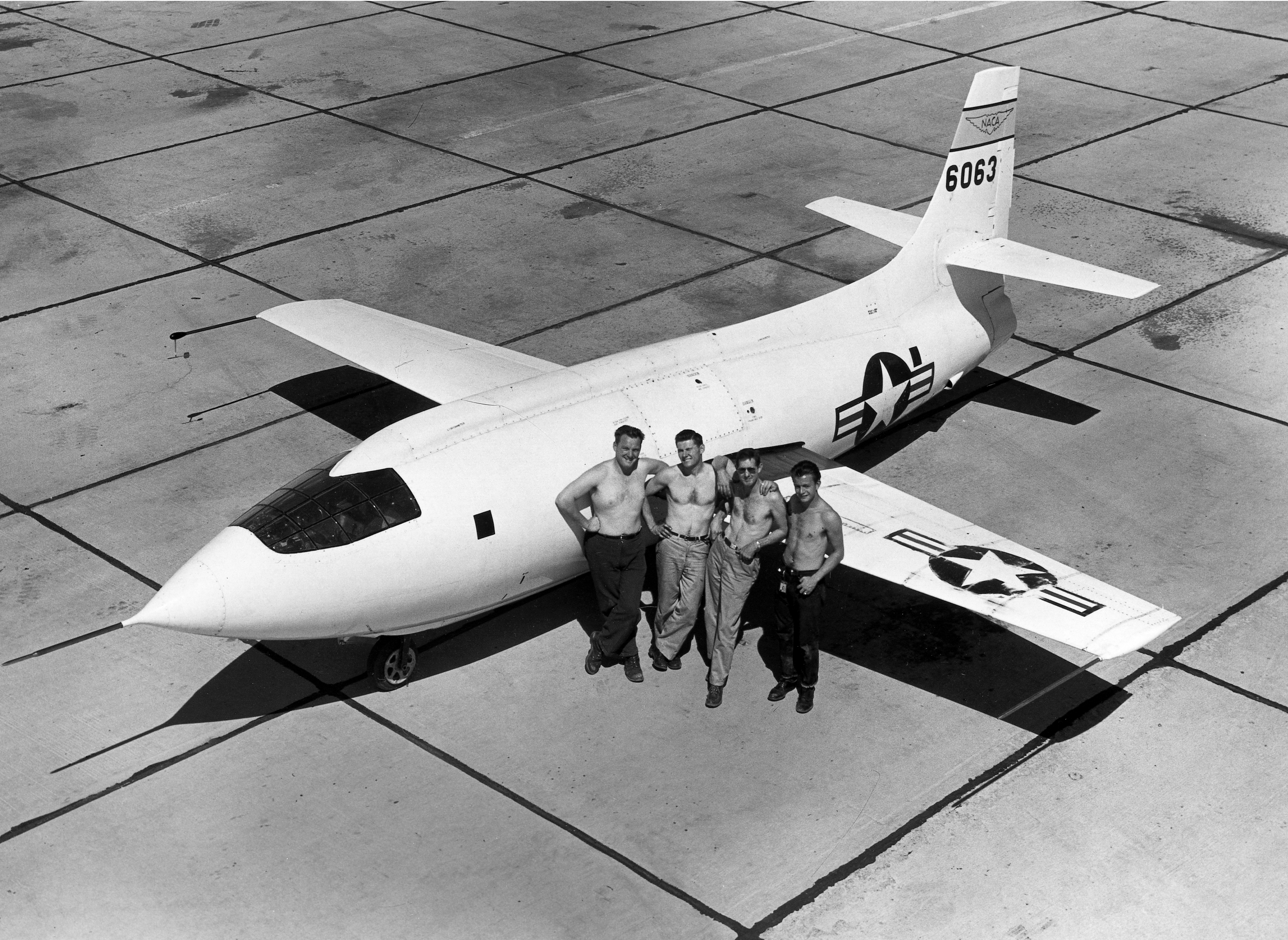
Bell X-1 supersonic research aircraft

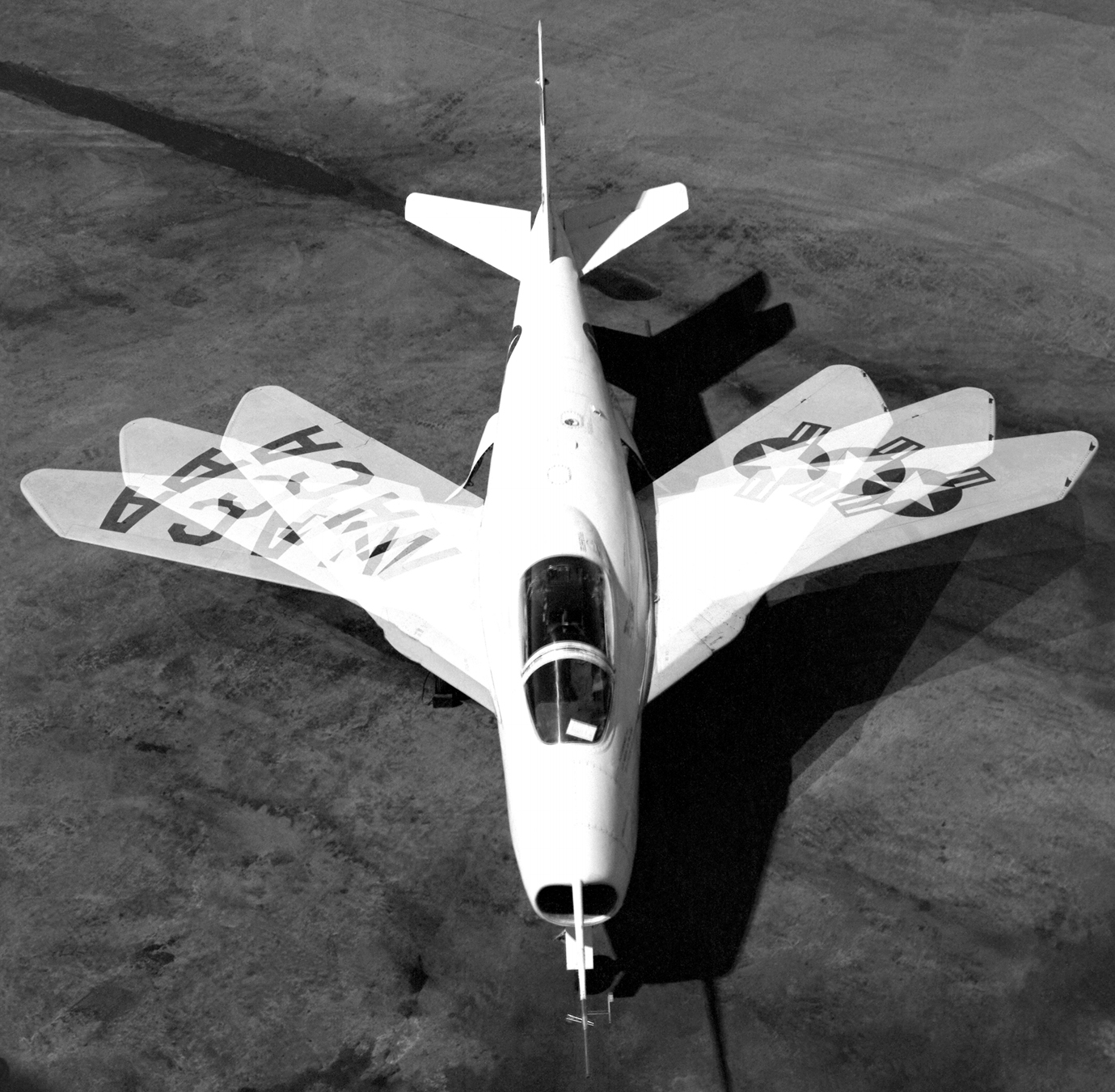
Bell X-5 variable-sweep wing testbed

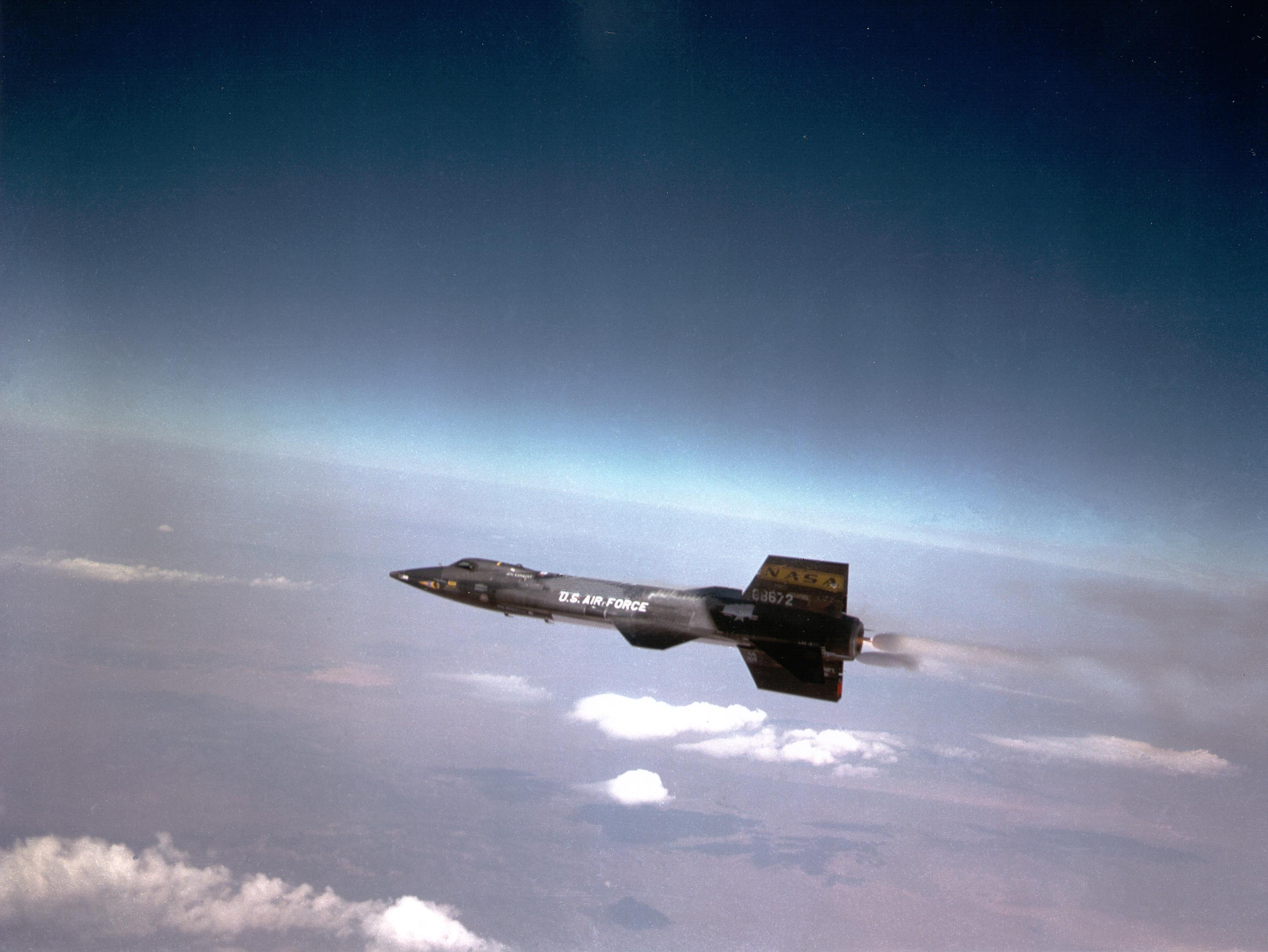
North American X-15 hypersonic rocket-powered research aircraft

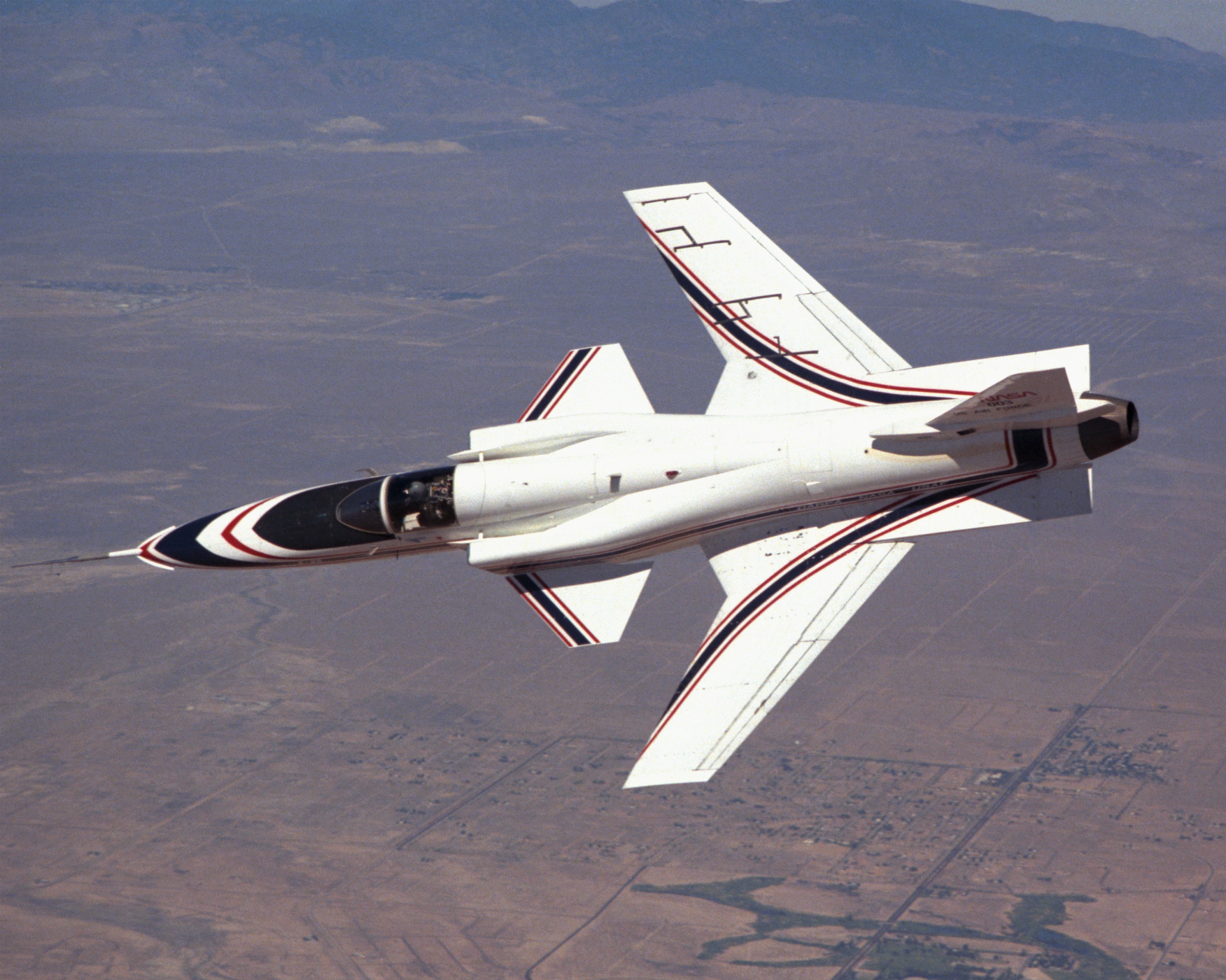
Grumman X-29 forward swept wing and stability research aircraft

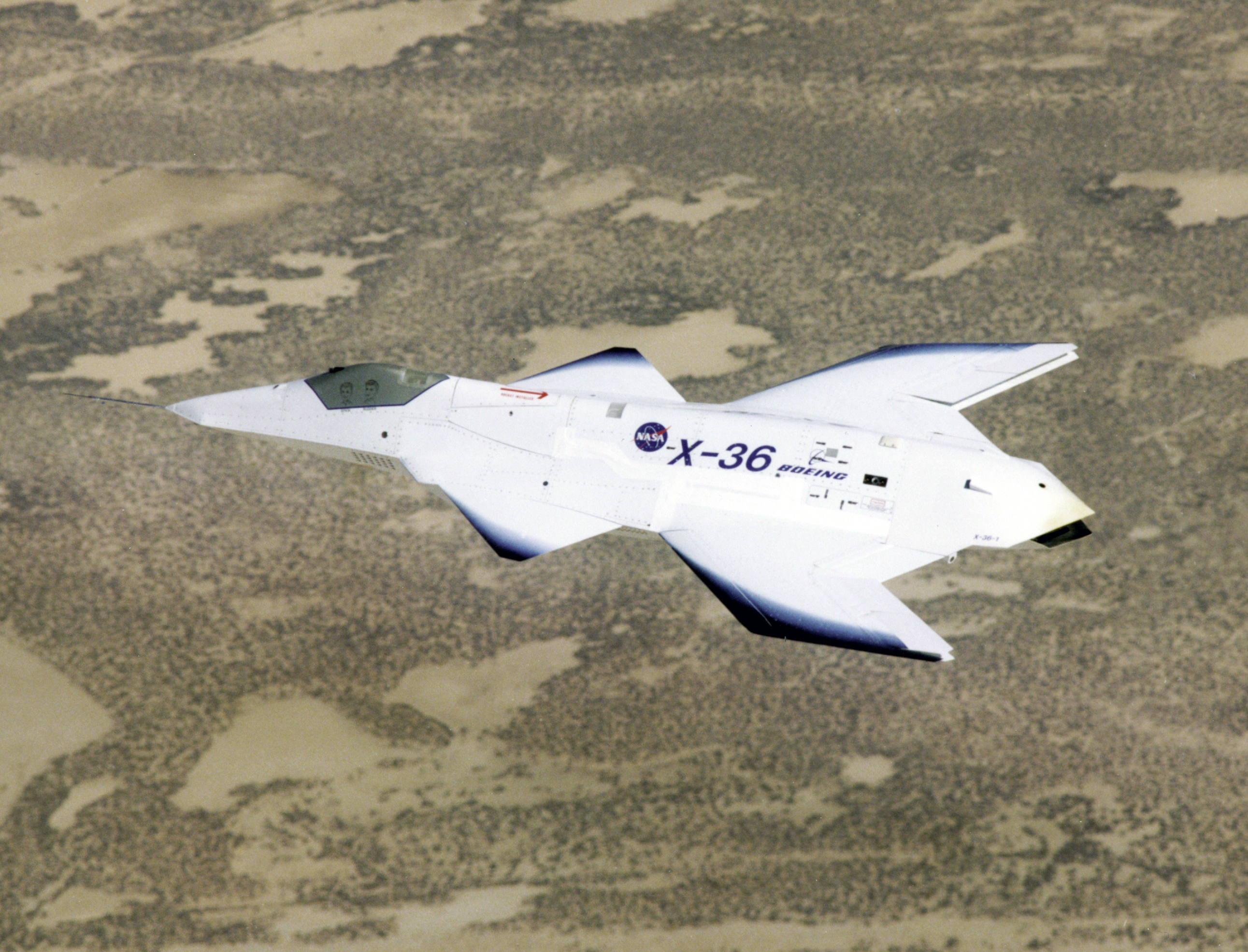
McDonnell Douglas X-36 in flight

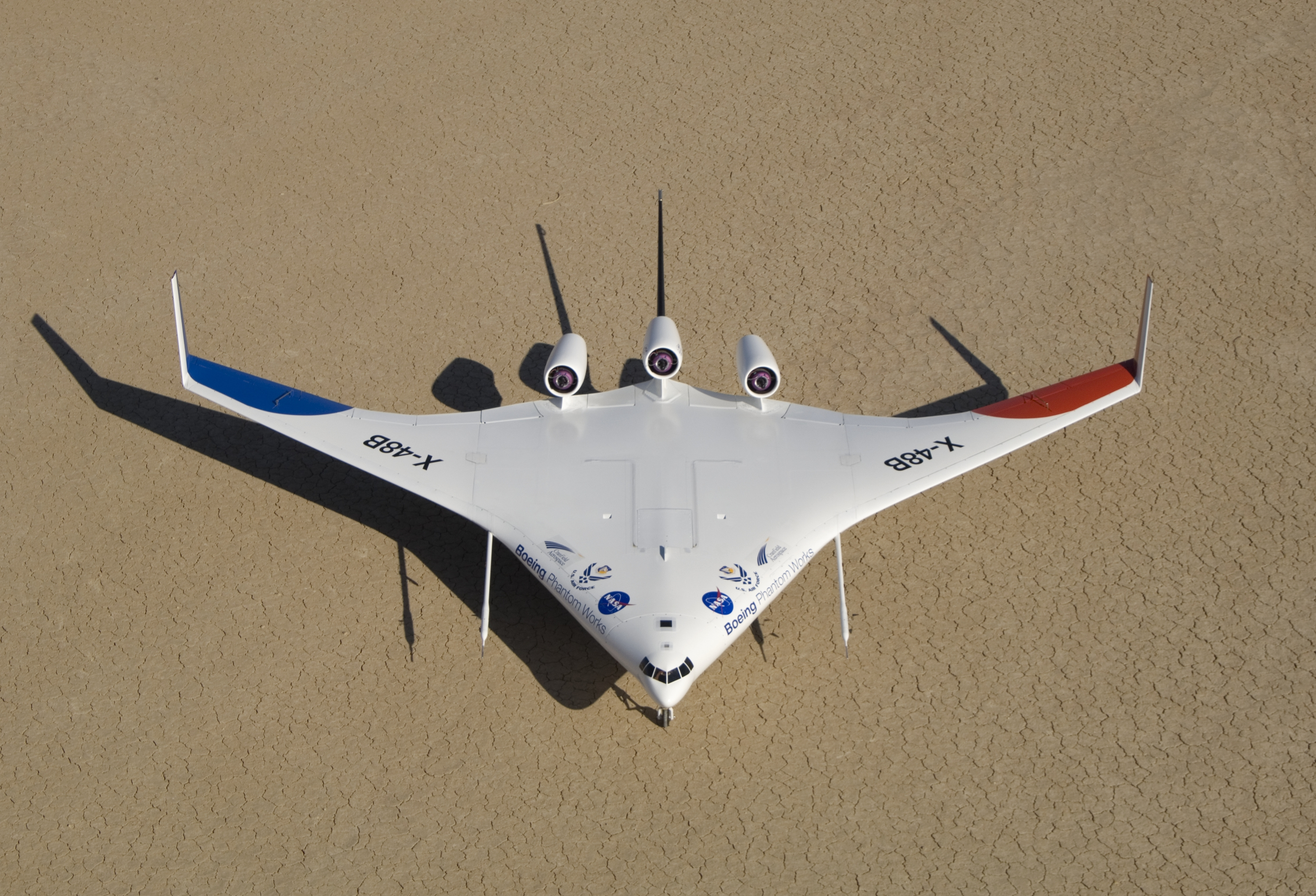
Boeing X-48B from above

=== X-planes ===
- Bell X-1 – Supersonic flight and sound barrier
- Bell X-2 – Mach 2–3 supersonic flight
- Douglas X-3 Stiletto – Sustained supersonic flight
- Northrop X-4 Bantam – Tailless aircraft
- Bell X-5 – Variable-sweep wing
- Convair X-6 – Nuclear reactor test aircraft (for nuclear-powered aircraft)
- Lockheed X-7 – Unmanned ramjet and guidance test missile
- Aerojet General X-8 – Sounding rocket (became Aerobee)
- Bell X-9 Shrike – Guided missile
- North American X-10 – Unmanned missile technology demonstrator
- Convair X-11 – Single engine missile testbed for Atlas
- Convair X-12 – Three engine missile testbed for Atlas
- Ryan X-13 Vertijet – Tail sitter VTOL jet
- Bell X-14 – Thrust vectoring VTOL jet
- North American X-15 – Hypersonic rocket-powered research aircraft (Mach 6)
- Bell X-16 - High-altitude reconnaissance jet
- Lockheed X-17 – Research rocket testing high mach re-entry
- Hiller X-18 – Tiltwing STOVL cargo aircraft
- Curtiss-Wright X-19 – VTOL tiltrotor
- Boeing X-20 Dyna-Soar – Spaceplane program
- Northrop X-21 – Laminar flow wing
- Bell X-22 – Ducted fan V/STOL
- Martin X-23 PRIME – Lifting body reentry vehicle testbed
- Martin Marietta X-24 – Lifting body test aircraft
- Bensen X-25 – Single-seat autogyro
- Schweizer X-26 Frigate – Sailplane
- Lockheed X-27 Lancer – high-performance technology demonstrator based on Lockheed CL-1200
- Pereira X-28A Sea Skimmer – Single-seat flying boat for US Navy
- Grumman X-29 – Forward-swept wing test aircraft
- Rockwell X-30 – Single-stage-to-orbit spacecraft
- Rockwell-MBB X-31 – Extreme angle of attack test aircraft
- Boeing X-32 – Joint Strike Fighter Program technology demonstrator
- Lockheed Martin X-33 – Unmanned scale demonstrator for VentureStar single stage to orbit spacecraft
- Orbital Sciences X-34 – Reusable launch vehicle testbed
- Lockheed Martin X-35 – Joint Strike Fighter Program technology demonstrator, developed into F-35 Lightning II
- McDonnell Douglas X-36 – Tailless fighter research agility aircraft
- Boeing X-37 – Reusable unmanned spacecraft
- NASA X-38 – Crew return vehicle for International Space Station (cancelled after tests)
- X-39 – Reserved for USAF/DARPA program use
- Boeing X-40 Space Maneuver Vehicle – Testbed for X-37 guidance and flight characteristics
- X-41 Common Aero Vehicle – Classified DARPA/NASA maneuvering re-entry vehicle
- X-42 Pop-Up Upper Stage – Classified rocket upper stage
- NASA X-43 Hyper-X – Hypersonic scramjet
- Lockheed Martin X-44 MANTA – Multi-axis tailless aircraft concept
- Boeing X-45 – Unmanned combat air vehicle
- Boeing X-46 – Unmanned combat air vehicle (proposal only)
- Northrop Grumman X-47A Pegasus – Unmanned combat air vehicle
- Northrop Grumman X-47B Iron Raven – Aircraft carrier capable unmanned combat air vehicle technology demonstrator
- Boeing X-48 – Blended wing aircraft
- Piasecki X-49 – Compound helicopter technology demonstrator
- Boeing X-50 Dragonfly – Gyrodyne unmanned aerial vehicle
- Boeing X-51 Waverider – Mach 5+ scramjet missile demonstrator
- Boeing X-53 Active Aeroelastic Wing – Wing warping flight demonstrator
- Gulfstream X-54 – Supersonic boom intensity research and demonstration aircraft
- Lockheed Martin X-55 – Advanced composites technology demonstrator
- Lockheed Martin X-56 – Flutter suppression and gust load testing unmanned testbed
- NASA X-57 Maxwell - Electric-powered light aircraft
- Lockheed Martin X-59 QueSST - Low-boom supersonic aircraft
- Generation Orbit X-60 - Air-launched single stage suborbital rocket vehicle
- Dynetics X-61 Gremlins - Unmanned aerial vehicle
- General Dynamics X-62 VISTA - Variable stability, thrust vectoring (formerly known as NF-16D VISTA)
- ABL Space Systems X-63 - Aerospike variant of RS1 rocket booster
- Invocon X-64 - Recoverable suborbital rocket
- Aurora X-65 CRANE - active flow control demonstrator
- Boeing X-66 - Truss-Based Wing demonstrator
- NASA X-70 Fractal - advanced flight control demonstrator

=== Other experimental types ===
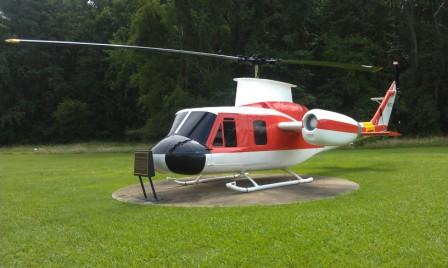
US Army Bell 533 high speed helicopter research aircraft

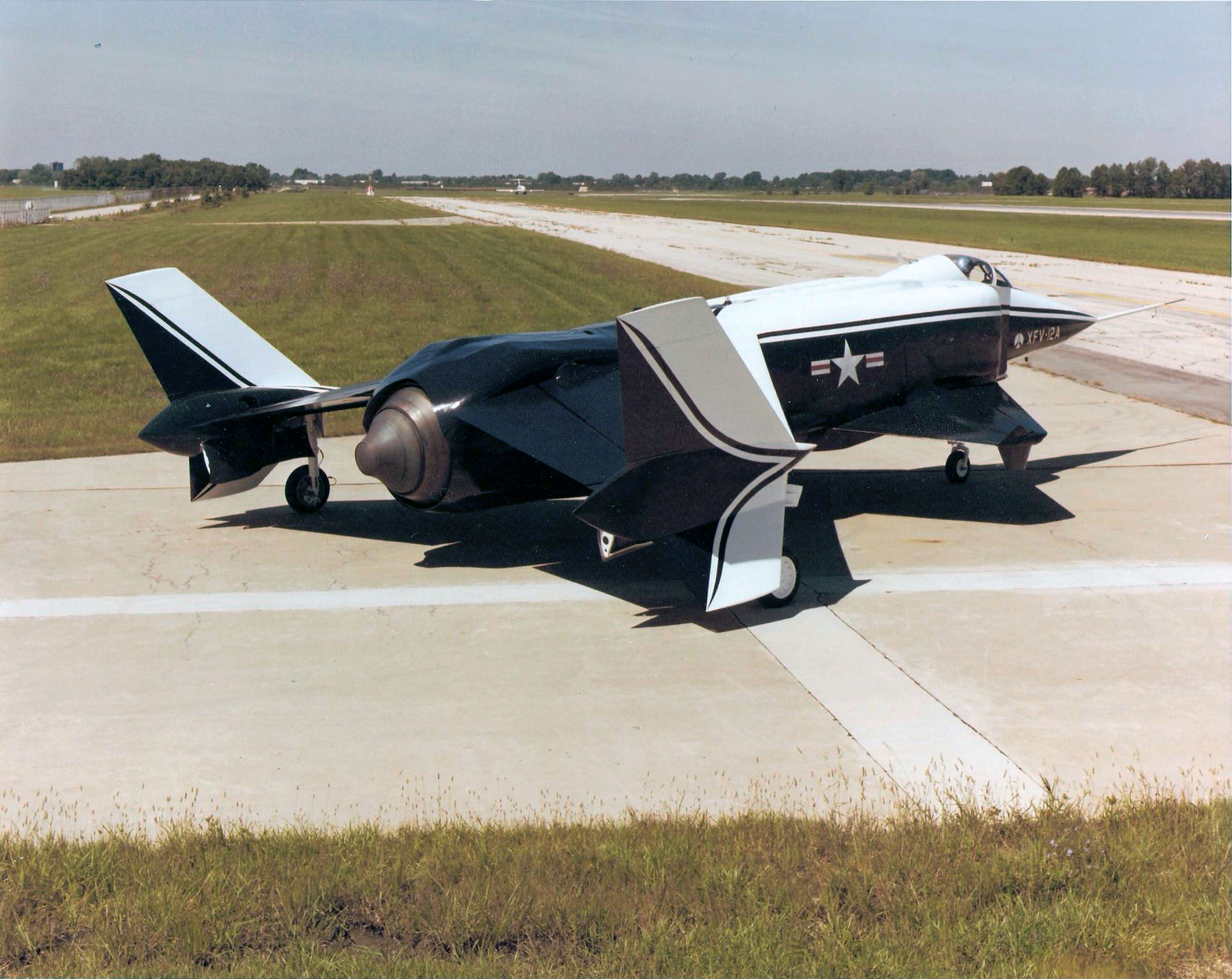
XFV-12A on ramp at NAA in Columbus, Ohio

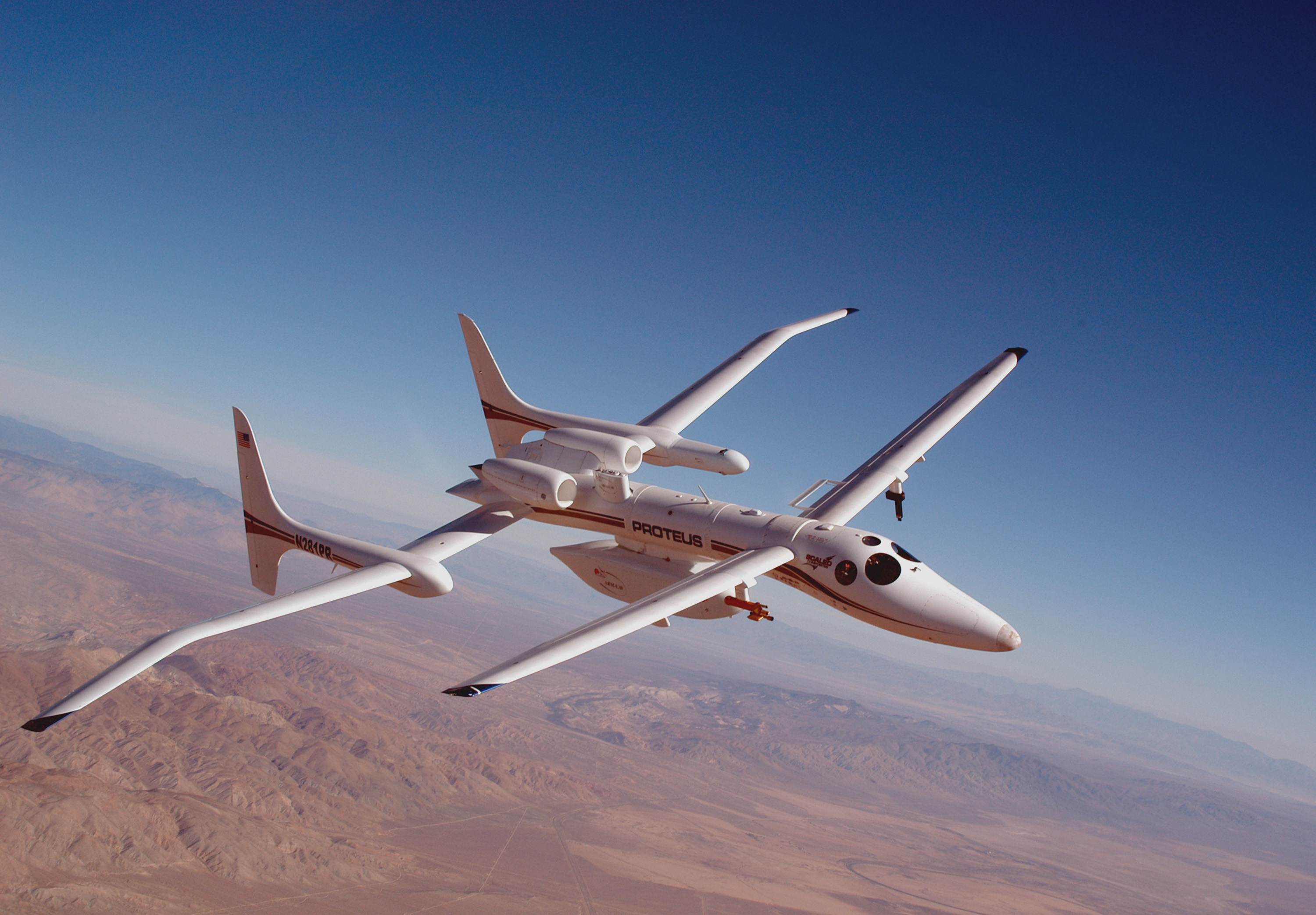
Scaled Composites Proteus in flight during 2002 for US Department of Energy ARM-UAV program

- Acme Sierra 1959 – Technology demonstrator
- AstroFlight Sunrise 1974 – Solar powered drone
- Ball-Bartoe Jetwing 1977 – Blown wing research
- Bell D-292 1985 – Advanced Composite Airframe Program
- Bell L-39 1946 – Swept wing research
- Bell Model 65 1954 – Tiltjet VTOL
- Bell XV-15 1977 – Tiltrotor VTOL, precursor to V-22 Osprey
- Bell 533 1962 – US Army high speed helicopter experiments
- Boeing ecoDemonstrator 2012 – Airliner fuel efficiency and noise reduction technologies
- Budd BB-1 Pioneer 1931 – Stainless steel construction
- Burnelli RB-1 1921 – Lifting body proof of concept vehicle
- Carlson-Lynch Vertipactor 1923 – Wingless VTOL aircraft
- Chrysler VZ-6 1959 – Ducted fan
- Convair NB-36 1955 – Nuclear propelled aircraft testbed
- Convair XFY Pogo 1954 – Fixed propeller VTOL
- Curtiss-Wright VZ-7 1958 – Quadcopter
- Curtiss-Wright X-100 1963 – Tilt rotor VTOL (developed into X-200 and X-19)
- Custer Channel Wings 1953 – Blown half-barrel wings
- Doak VZ-4 1958 – Tilt-fan VTOL
- Douglas D-558-I Skystreak 1947 – Supersonic research
- Douglas D-558-II Skyrocket 1948 – Supersonic research
- Fairchild VZ-5 1959 – Deflected air VTOL
- Farrar LSG-1 Bird Flight Machine 1969 – Glider to research bird flight

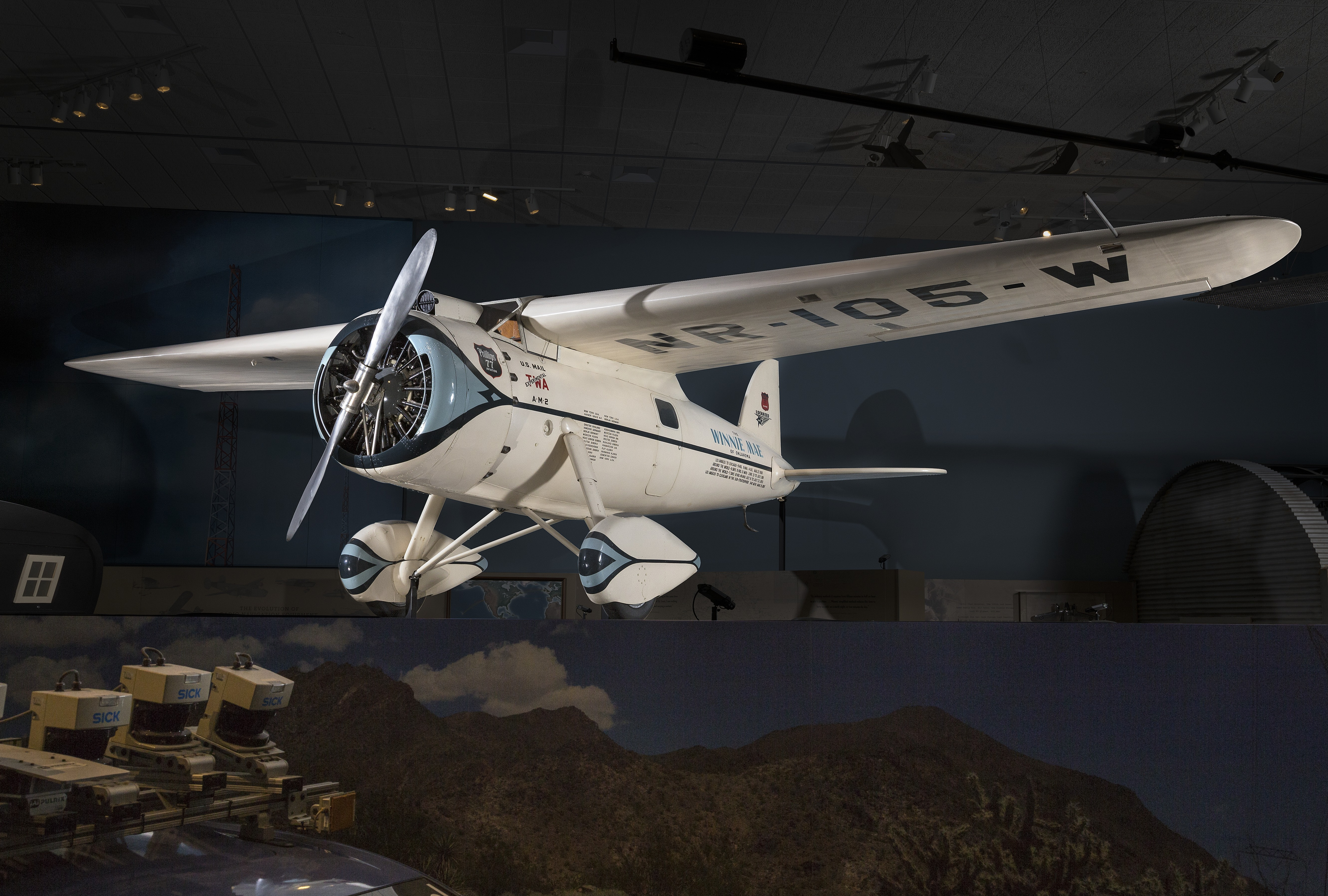
Lockheed Vega Winnie Mae high-altitude research aircraft – confirmed existence of jet stream

- General Dynamics F-16XL 1982 – Relaxed stability delta wing, boundary layer suction laminar flow
- General Dynamics F-16 VISTA 1992 – Variable stability, thrust vectoring (Redesignated X-62 Vista in 2021)
- General Electric GE36 testbed 1986 – Propfan engine testbed on a modified Boeing 727
- Goodyear Inflatoplane 1956 – Inflatable rescue aircraft technology demonstrator
- Gossamer Albatross 1979 – Human-powered flight
- Gossamer Condor 1977 – Human-powered flight
- modified Grumman Gulfstream II – Engine testbed for the NASA Propfan Test Assessment (PTA)
- Hiller VZ-1 Pawnee 1955 – Direct lift rotor platform
- Hypersonic Technology Vehicle 2 2010 – Hypersonic glider
- Kaman K-125 1947 – Intermesh twin rotor helicopter, servo-flap control
- Kaman K-16 – Modified Grumman Goose for tiltwing V/STOL research
- Lockheed Altair 1938 – Twinned engine testbed (both engines were in a single cowl)
- NASA Dryden Lockheed C-140 Jetstar 1964 – Electronic variable stability, propfan engine (1981) and laminar flow wing testbed (1985)
- Lockheed Have Blue – Stealth technology demonstrator
- Lockheed Vega Winnie Mae – high-altitude research – confirmed existence of jet stream
- Lockheed QT-2 – Quiet Thruster noise suppression experiments
- Lockheed XC-35 – Pressurized cabin development

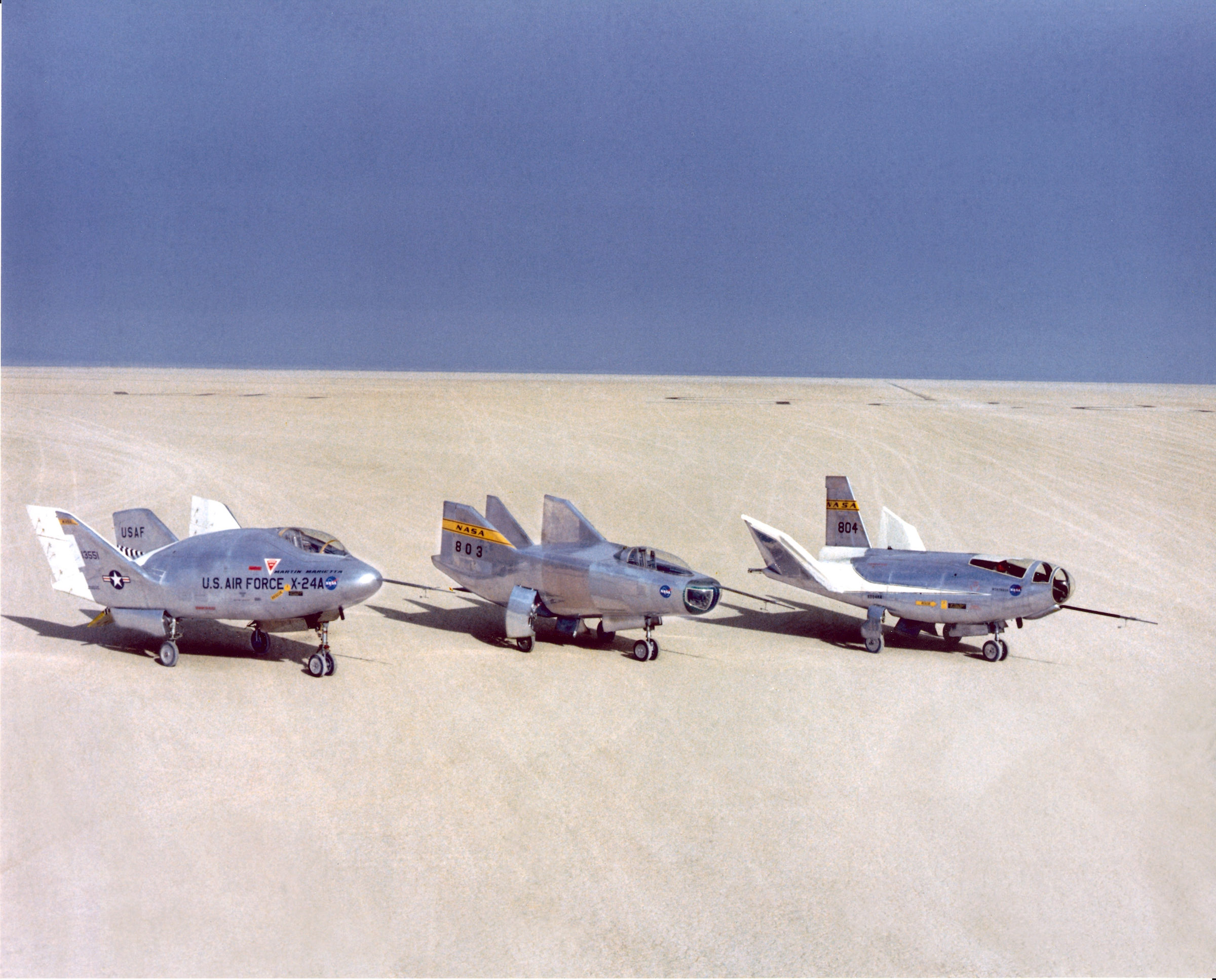
Lifting body research aircraft – from left to right, X-24A, M2-F3 and HL-10

- Lockheed XV-4 Hummingbird – Jetlift VTOL
- LTV XC-142 – VTOL transport technology demonstrator
- Martin 162A Tadpole Clipper – Proof of concept aircraft
- Martin XB-26H Marauder – Tandem undercarriage
- McDonnell Douglas MD-81 UHB – General Electric GE36 and PW-Allison 578-DX propfan engine testbed
- McDonnell Douglas F-15 STOL/MTD – Thrust vector, flight control system testbed
- NASA AD-1 – Oblique Wing
- NASA Environmental Research Aircraft and Sensor Technology experimental aircraft – ALTUS, Pathfinder and Helios
- NASA Hyper III – Lifting body remotely piloted vehicle
- NASA M2-F1 – Lifting body/re-entry vehicle
- NASA Pathfinder – Solar-powered aircraft
- Northrop F-5 Shaped Sonic Boom Demonstrator – Shockwave reduction

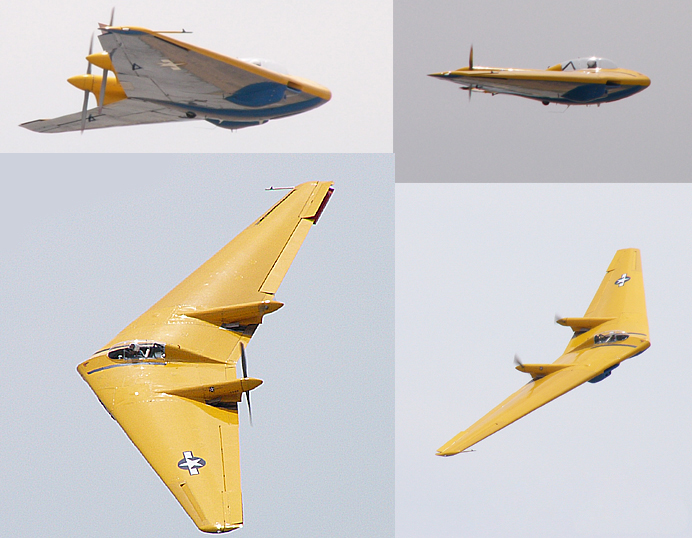
Northrop N-9M flying wing

- Northrop HL-10 – Lifting body/re-entry vehicle research
- Northrop M2-F2 – Lifting body/re-entry vehicle research
- Northrop M2-F3 – Lifting body/re-entry vehicle research
- Northrop N-1M – Flying wing research
- Northrop N-9M – Flying wing proof of concept aircraft for Northrop YB-35
- Northrop Tacit Blue – Stealth technology demonstrator
- Piasecki PV-2 – Helicopter technology demonstrator
- Piasecki VZ-8 Airgeep – Liftfan VTOL research
- Piasecki PA-97 1980 – Heavy lifter
- Republic XF-84H "Thunderscreech" – Supersonic propeller testbed
- Republic XF-91 Thunderceptor – Inversely tapered swept wing
- Rockwell HiMAT – Maneuverability and control research
- Rockwell XFV-12 – Augmented wing vectored thrust VTOL
- Rotary Rocket Roton 1999 – Single stage to orbit helicopter rocket
- Ryan VZ-3 Vertiplane 1958 – Blown flap VTOL research
- Ryan XV-5 Vertifan 1964 – Fan lift VTOL research
- Sawyer Skyjacker II – Low aspect ratio research aircraft

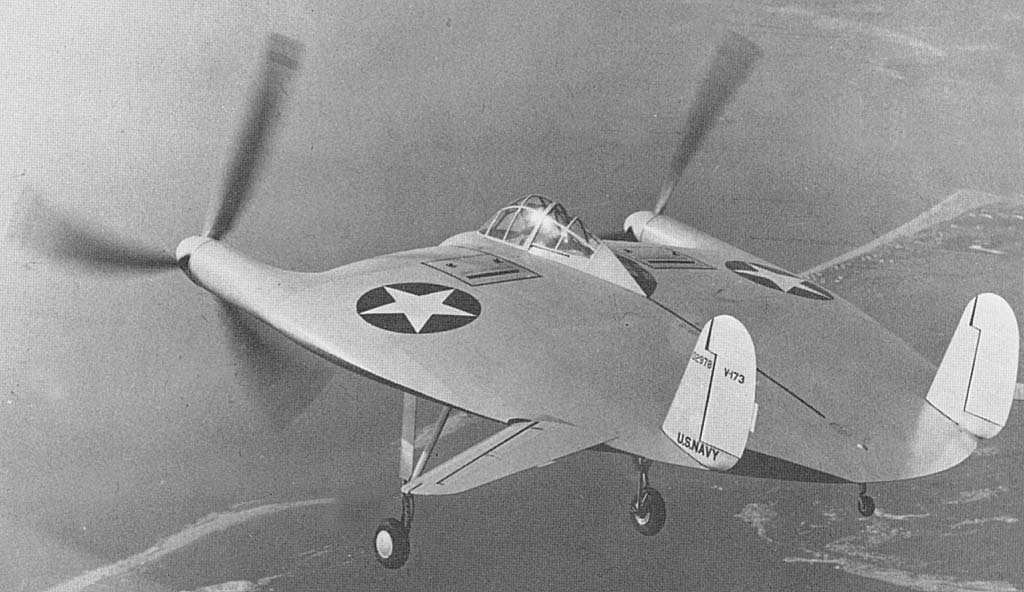
Vought V-173 disk wing research aircraft

- Scaled Composites Proteus 1998 – Telecommunication relay testbed
- Schweizer SGS 1-29 1958 – Laminar flow research on wings made of metal
- Sikorsky S-69 1981 – Compound co-axial research
- Sikorsky S-72 1976 – Helicopter/aircraft hybrid research
- Sikorsky S-75 1984 – Advanced Composite Aircraft Program
- Sikorsky S-76 SHADOW 1985 – Sikorsky Helicopter Advanced Demonstrator and Operator Workload
- Stinson L-1 Vigilant – One example modified for boundary layer experiments
- Travel Air 2000 – One modified for Besler steam powered aircraft
- Vertol VZ-2 – tilt wing VTOL research
- Vought V-173 – Disk wing research for Vought XF5U
- Vought V-326 – High-altitude test aircraft
- Vought-Sikorsky VS-300 – Helicopter

== See also ==
- List of German WW II prototypes and projects
