= Kayaba Ku-4 =

Japanese experimental aircraft

Ku-4
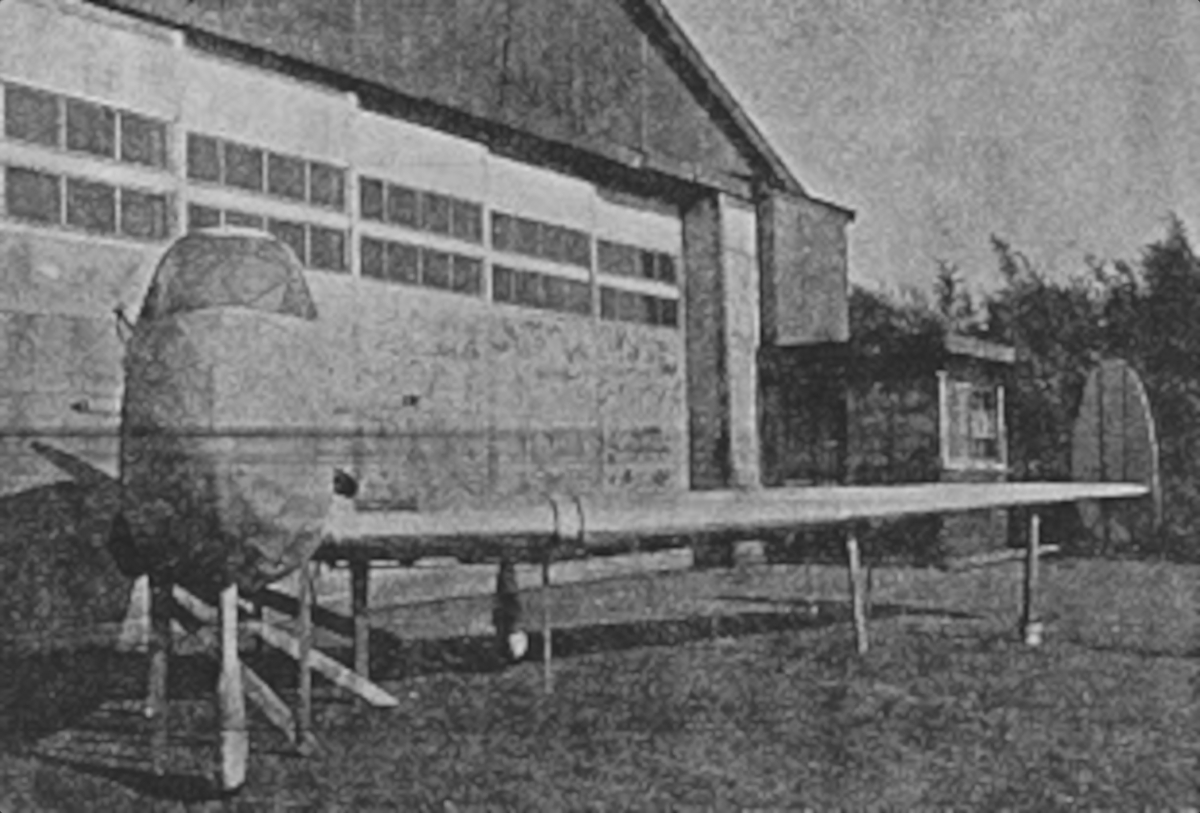

General information
- Type: Research aircraft
- National origin: Japan
- Manufacturer: Kayaba Industry
- Designer: Hidemasa Kimura
- Status: Cancelled project

The Kayaba Ku-4 was a research aircraft built in Japan in 1940 to investigate the possibilities of tailless aircraft designs. It followed designer Hidemasa Kimura's successful Ku-2 and Ku-3 designs for the Imperial Japanese Army. While these previous aircraft had been gliders, however, the Ku-4 was to be powered by a pusher engine. It had a low, swept wing, and like the Ku-2, fins at the wingtips.

Work on the prototype was well advanced by April 1941, but the following month, Kimura's relationship with the Army soured following the crash of the Ku-2. The Ku-4 was canceled, and Kimura eventually received only ¥17,000 of the ¥200,000 that had been promised for the development of his tailless designs.

== Specifications (as designed) ==
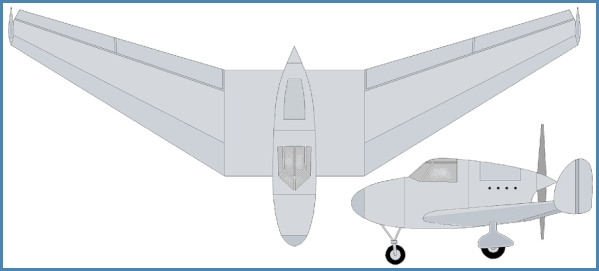

General characteristics

- Crew: One pilot
- Length: 3.42 m (11 ft 3 in)
- Wingspan: 9.80 m (32 ft 2 in)
- Wing area: 9.0 m^{2} (97 sq ft)
- Powerplant: 1 × piston engine , 90 kW (120 hp)

Performance

- Maximum speed: 180 km/h (110 mph, 96 kn)
- Range: 300 km (190 mi, 170 nmi)

== See also ==
Aircraft of comparable role, configuration, and era

- Handley Page Manx

Related lists

- List of experimental aircraft
- List of tailless aircraft
