= KYB Corporation =

Japanese automotive company

- Company type: Public KK
- Traded as: TYO: 7242
- Industry: Automotive
- Founded: (November 19, 1919; 106 years ago)
- Founder: Shiro Kayaba
- Headquarters: World Trade Center Building, 4-1, Hamamatsu-cho 2-chome, Minato-ku, Tokyo 105-6111, Japan
- Key people: Tadahiko Ozawa (Chairman); Masao Usui (President and CEO)
- Products: Automotive components; Hydraulic components; Aircraft components; Welfare and environmental products
- Revenue: ▲US$ 3.42 billion (FY 2013) (JPY 352.71 billion) (FY 2013)
- Net income: ▲US$ 123.89 million (FY 2013) (JPY 12.76 billion) (FY 2013)
- Number of employees: 14,754 (consolidated, as of March 31, 2018)
- Website: Official website

KYB Corporation (KYB株式会社, KYB kabushiki gaisha; formerly Kayaba Kogyo kabushiki gaisha (カヤバ工業株式会社) until 1 October 2015) is a Japanese, Tokyo-based automotive company.

Among KYB's main products company are shock absorbers, air suspensions, power steering systems, hydraulic pumps, motors, cylinders, and valves. It is one of the world's largest shock absorber manufacturers and it also has the largest market share of concrete mixer trucks in Japan, with 85% of the market.

The company has 34 manufacturing plants and 62 offices in 21 countries. KYB's American aftermarket distribution of automotive shocks and struts is headquartered in Greenwood, Indiana, with additional KYB manufacturing and distribution facilities in metro Chicago, Southern California, and metro Indianapolis. KYB Americas employs more than 100 people in all facilities. Shocks and struts for vehicles are the most popular KYB products distributed in North America.

== Business segments and products ==
=== Automotive and motorcycle products ===
==== Automotive components ====
- Shock absorbers
- Semi-active air suspensions
- Adjustable shock absorbers
- Power steering systems
- Electric power steering units (EPS)
- Four-wheel steering (4WS) electric actuator
- Solenoid
- Sensors
- Noise resistant pressure sensors

==== Motorcycle components ====
- Suspensions
- Shock absorbers for ATVs
- Shock absorbers for snowmobiles

=== Hydraulic components ===
- used in construction machinery, industrial vehicles, agricultural machinery, railroad equipment, industrial machinery, building equipment, civil engineering equipment and stage equipment

==== Testers ====
- High precision leak tester
- Portable fatigue testers
- Gate type fatigue testers
- Torsional fatigue testers
- Internal pressure fatigue testers
- Shock absorbers testers
- Noise check systems
- Road simulators for automobiles
- Road simulators for motorcycles
- Simulators for research and training

=== Aeronautical, special-purpose vehicles and marine products ===
- Aircraft components
- Special-purpose vehicles
- Marine components

=== Environment, welfare and disaster prevention products ===
- Self-propelled waste checker conveyors
- Earthquake simulator trucks
- Biomixers
- Chipping vehicle for pruned branches
- Vehicle for shredding sensitive documents
- Shock absorbers for chair skis
- Solar projectors
- Mobile keeper (remote monitor camera with server function)

== Aircraft manufacturing ==
=== Aircraft manufacturing during and after World War II ===
The company between 1939 and 1941 developed several gliders, autogyros and research aircraft for the Imperial Japanese Army. These are:

- Kimura HK-1
- Kayaba Ku-2
- Kayaba Ku-3
- Kayaba Ku-4
- Kayaba Ka-Go
- Kayaba Ka-1
- Kayaba Ka-2

After the war, in 1954, the company built a gyrodyne, named Kayaba Heliplane. The development of this aircraft started in 1952 when Shiro Kayaba, the founder of the company, obtained the fuselage of a Cessna 170B and, over the course of two years, turned it into a convertiplane.

== Scandal ==
- In October, 2018, Kayaba Industry said it had falsified data on the quality of some of its shock absorbers which were used in over 70 government and municipal office buildings including Tokyo Sky Tree, Tokyo Station and facilities for 2020 Summer Olympics since at least 2003 in Japan. In addition, all the faulty Japanese quake absorbers were only exported to Taiwan.

== See also ==
- Shock absorber
- Car suspension
- Motorcycle suspension
- Motorcycle fork
