= LSG-1 =

LSG-1 or LSG1 may refer to:

- Farrar LSG-1 Bird Flight Machine, research glider
- LSG1, a human enzyme
