= Antonov E-153 =

General information
- Type: Tailless fighter plane
- National origin: Soviet Union
- Manufacturer: Antonov
- Number built: 1

The Antonov E-153 (Russian: Э-153) was a prototype Soviet experimental fighter designed by Oleg Antonov.

== History ==
The E-153 project represents the first (of two known) attempts by aircraft designer Oleg Antonov to create fighter aircraft. With an initiative proposal to create a fighter, Oleg K. Antonov turned to the USSR Ministry of Aviation Industry at the beginning of 1947, in response, where he received the approval of M.V. Khrunichev.

== See also ==
- List of tailless aircraft
