= Handley Page Manx =

Experimental British aircraft from World War II

HP.75 Manx
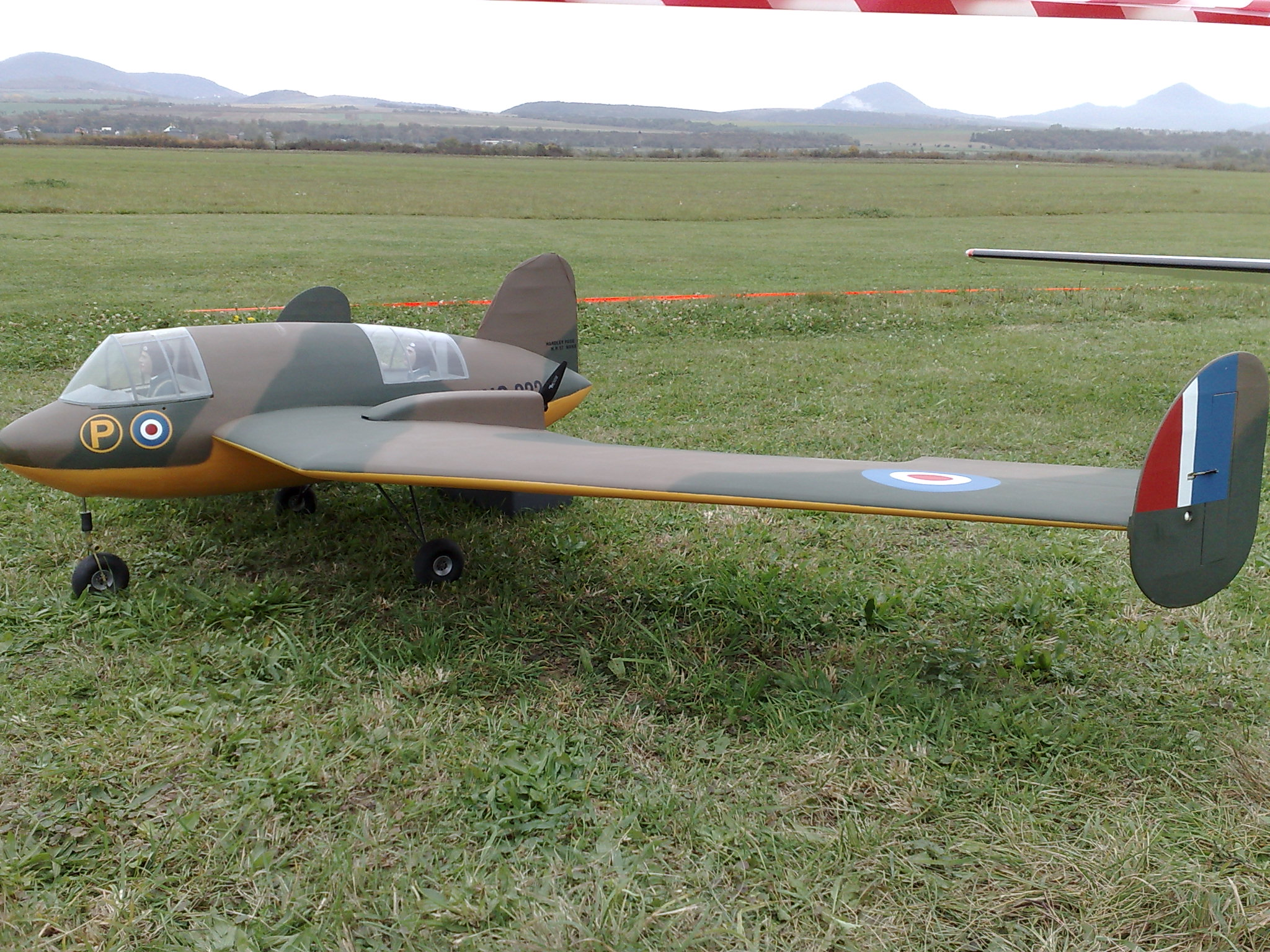
- Modern radio-controlled model of the Manx

General information
- Type: Experimental
- National origin: United Kingdom
- Manufacturer: Handley Page
- Designer: Gustav Lachmann
- Number built: 1

History
- First flight: 11 June 1943

The Handley Page HP. 75 Manx was a British experimental aircraft designed by Handley Page that flew test flights in the early 1940s for possible transport, bomber and fighter aircraft projects. It was notable for its unconventional design characteristics, being a twin-engine tailless design of pusher configuration.

== Design and development ==
The Manx (named after a well-known breed of stub-tailed housecat) was built to participate in a flight research program investigating problems associated with tailless aircraft. The partially-swept wings supported the vertical stabilizers of a twin tail, with elevons for pitch and roll control.

Construction of the prototype was subcontracted to Dart Aircraft of Dunstable. There were serious issues encountered early in the development phase that caused a delay in the testing program. After it was delivered in 1939, redesigns had to be made because the Manx was too heavy, and there were also structural integrity issues with the main spar.

An unorthodox aspect of the Manx design incorporated into the aircraft was that the main undercarriage was retractable, while the nose gear remained fixed.

Taxi tests began in early 1940, but inspection revealed serious deterioration of the wing structures, which required extensive repair. These and further problems delayed the maiden flight until June 1943 (sources conflict as to whether it was 11 or 25 June.) The first flight was terminated early when the canopy was lost in mid-flight, but the pilot managed to land the plane safely. In December 1945 the Manx's regular crew were killed flying the Handley Page Hermes prototype. The Manx had accumulated only about 17 hours of flight time over approximately 30 flights when flight tests were finally terminated in April 1946. The sole example built was scrapped in 1952.

== Specifications (HP.75 Manx) ==
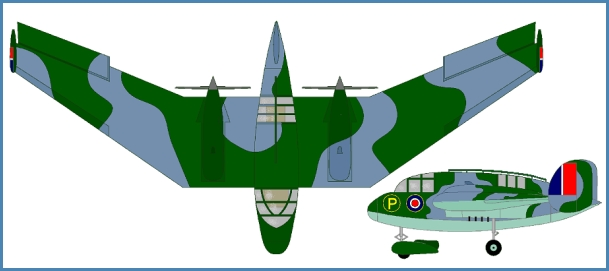
Handley Page Manx

Data from Jane’s Fighting Aircraft of World War II

General characteristics

- Crew: two, pilot and flight test observer
- Length: 18 ft 1 in (5.5 m)
- Wingspan: 40 ft 0 in (12.2 m)
- Wing area: 246 sq ft (22.9 m^{2})
- Empty weight: 3,000 lb (1,361 kg)
- Gross weight: 4,000 lb (1,814 kg)
- Powerplant: 2 × de Havilland Gipsy Major 4-cyl. inverted air-cooled inline piston engines, 140 hp (100 kW) each

Performance

- Maximum speed: 150 mph (240 km/h, 130 kn)
- Service ceiling: 15,000 ft (4,600 m)

== See also ==
Aircraft of comparable role, configuration, and era

- Armstrong Whitworth A.W.52
- Kayaba Ku-4
- Miles Libellula

Related lists

- List of experimental aircraft
- List of tailless aircraft
