= Charpentier C1 =

General information
- Type: Experimental aircraft
- National origin: France
- Designer: Jean Charpentier
- Status: Cancelled
- Number built: 1

History
- First flight: January 1934

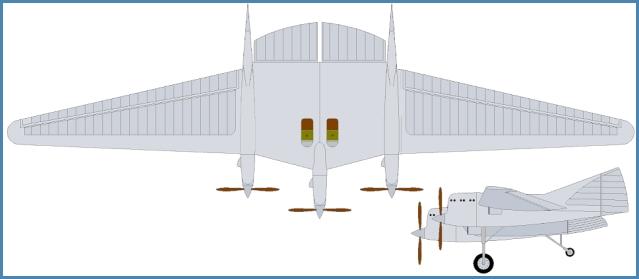
A Charpentier C1 design from 1935

The Charpentier C1 was a French tailless experimental aircraft that was designed by Jean Charpentier during the 1930s. The single prototype crashed on its first flight in January 1934 and further development was cancelled.

== Specifications (variant specified) ==
Data from Il ne vola qu'un court instant... le Charpentier C 1

General characteristics

- Length: 5.3 m (17 ft 5 in)
- Wingspan: 15 m (49 ft 3 in)
- Wing area: 24 m^{2} (260 sq ft)
- Gross weight: 2,400 kg (5,291 lb)
- Powerplant: 3 × Hispano-Suiza 6P water-cooled 6-cylinder inline reciprocating engine, 75 kW (100 hp) each
- Propellers: 2-bladed, 1.9 m (6 ft 3 in) diameter

Performance

== Bibliography ==
- Borget, Michel (November 1977). "Il ne vola qu'un court instant... le Charpentier C 1" [It Only Flew for a Short Time... The Charpentier C 1]. Le Fana de l'Aviation (in French) (96): 8–11. ISSN 0757-4169.
