= Kayaba Ku-3 =

Japanese experimental glider

Ku-3
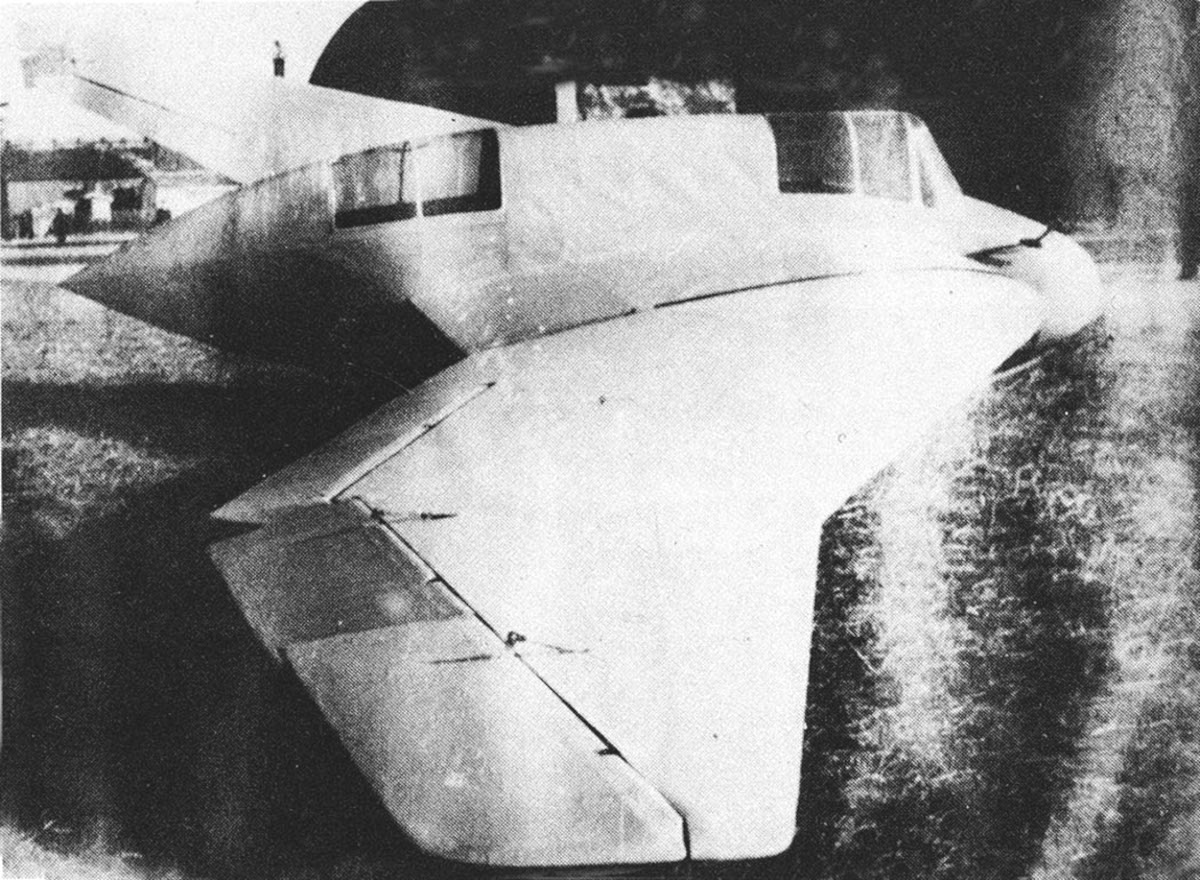

General information
- Type: Research glider
- National origin: Japan
- Manufacturer: Kayaba Industry
- Designer: Hidemasa Kimura and Joji Washimi
- Number built: 1

History
- First flight: February 1941

The Kayaba Ku-3 was a glider built in Japan in 1941 to investigate the possibilities of tailless aircraft. Building on the success of the Ku-2 design of the previous year, the Ku-3 was a substantially larger aircraft with several novel features. The small vertical fins of the Ku-2 were abandoned, leaving the Ku-3 with no vertical control surfaces.

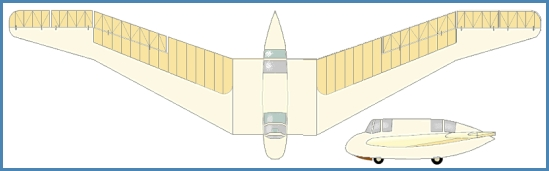

The crescent wing had three pairs of control surfaces on the trailing edge. The outer, less-swept wing sections had a greater dihedral than the inner sections.

The prototype crashed after 67 flights, when the test pilot was unable to recover from a spin.
