= Farrar LSG-1 Bird Flight Machine =

1969 experimental research glider

LSG-1 Bird Flight Machine

General information
- Type: Experimental research glider
- National origin: United States
- Designer: Demetrius F. Farrar Jr.
- Status: Production completed
- Primary user: Vanderbilt University
- Number built: one

History
- Introduction date: 1969

The Farrar LSG-1 Bird Flight Machine is an American, high-wing, V-tailed, single-seat, experimental research glider that was designed and built by Demetrius F. Farrar Jr. in 1969 for exploring aspects of bird flight.

== Design and development ==
The LSG-1 was specially designed by Farrar for research purposes as part of a Vanderbilt University project into how birds fly and was supported by the US National Science Foundation. The aircraft's design goals included a stall speed of 20 mph (32 km/h) and a 60-foot per minute (0.30 m/s) sink rate.

The aircraft is of mixed construction. The fuselage is made from a sandwich of balsa and fiberglass, while the wing is of wood and Kevlar, built on an aluminium spar. Its 61 ft (18.6 m) span wing employs an unusual Wortmann FX 05-H-126 airfoil, which was originally designed for helicopter use. This airfoil section was chosen because it has zero pitching moment, which thus allows moderate torsional loads despite the resulting glider's relatively large wing area of 230 sq ft (21 m^{2}). The LSG-1 has no glidepath control devices, such as dive brakes, making it a challenge to land. Despite its large wingspan the aircraft has a very low empty weight of 181 lb (82 kg), giving it a very low wing loading of 1.55 lb/sq ft (7.6 kg/m^{2}).

Only one LSG-1 was built and it was registered with the US Federal Aviation Administration in the Experimental - Amateur-built category.

== Operational history ==
The aircraft was used to explore bird exploitation of microlift under supervision of Gary Osoba. In August 2011, 42 years after it was completed, the aircraft was still on the FAA aircraft register and still owned by the designer. Its registration expired and was cancelled on 29 April 2013 and it is unknown if the aircraft still exists or not.

== Operators ==
- Vanderbilt University

== Specifications (LSG-1) ==
Data from Sailplane Directory

General characteristics

- Crew: one
- Wingspan: 61 ft (19 m)
- Wing area: 230 sq ft (21 m^{2})
- Aspect ratio: 16.18:1
- Airfoil: Wortmann FX 05-H-126
- Empty weight: 181 lb (82 kg)
- Gross weight: 356 lb (161 kg)

Performance

- Maximum glide ratio: 33:1
- Rate of sink: 63 ft/min (0.32 m/s)
- Wing loading: 1.55 lb/sq ft (7.6 kg/m^{2})

== See also ==
Related lists

- List of gliders
