= Kimura HK-1 =

Japanese experimental glider

HK-1
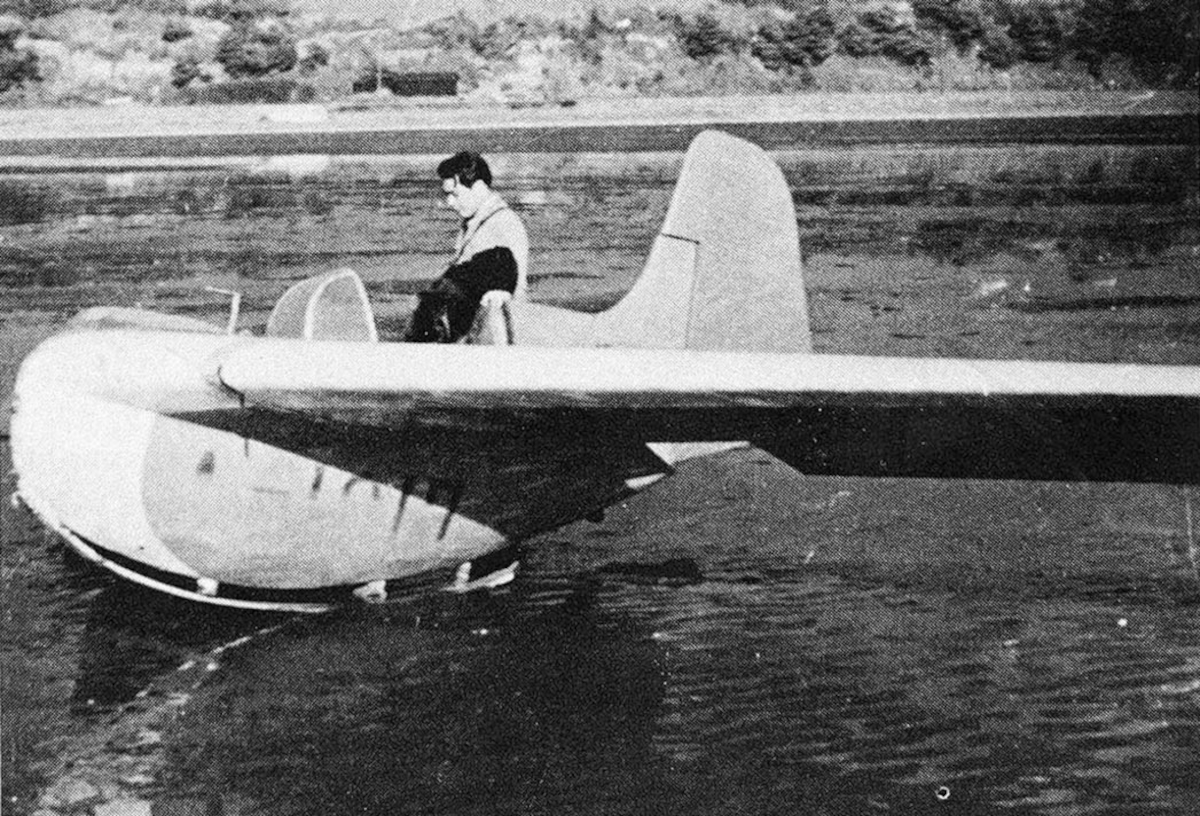

General information
- Type: Research glider
- National origin: Japan
- Manufacturer: Ito Airplane Works
- Designer: Hidemasa Kimura
- Status: Cancelled
- Number built: 1

History
- Introduction date: 1939
- Retired: 1940
- Developed into: Kayaba Ku-2

The Kimura HK-1 was a glider built in Japan in 1939 to investigate the possibilities of tailless aircraft. It was a single-seat design with an open cockpit, swept wings, and a single tail fin. The HK-1 made a total of 169 test flights between 15 December 1939 and 7 March 1940, towed aloft behind a car.

By this time, the glider's success had attracted the attention of the Army, which arranged to purchase the aircraft. It was taken to the Tachikawa factory for testing, but crashed after only 13 flights, on 16 April 1940. The design proved sufficiently interesting for the Army to commission further research into the tailless concept, which would lead to the Kayaba Ku-2.

== Specifications ==
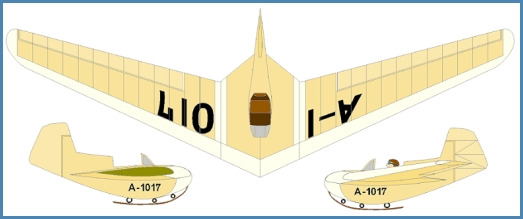

General characteristics

- Crew: One pilot
- Length: 3.50 m (11 ft 6 in)
- Wingspan: 10.00 m (32 ft 10 in)
- Height: 1.80 m (5 ft 11 in)
- Wing area: 14.0 m^{2} (151 sq ft)

Performance

- Maximum speed: 85 km/h (53 mph, 46 kn)
