= Kayaba Ku-2 =

Japanese experimental glider

Ku-2
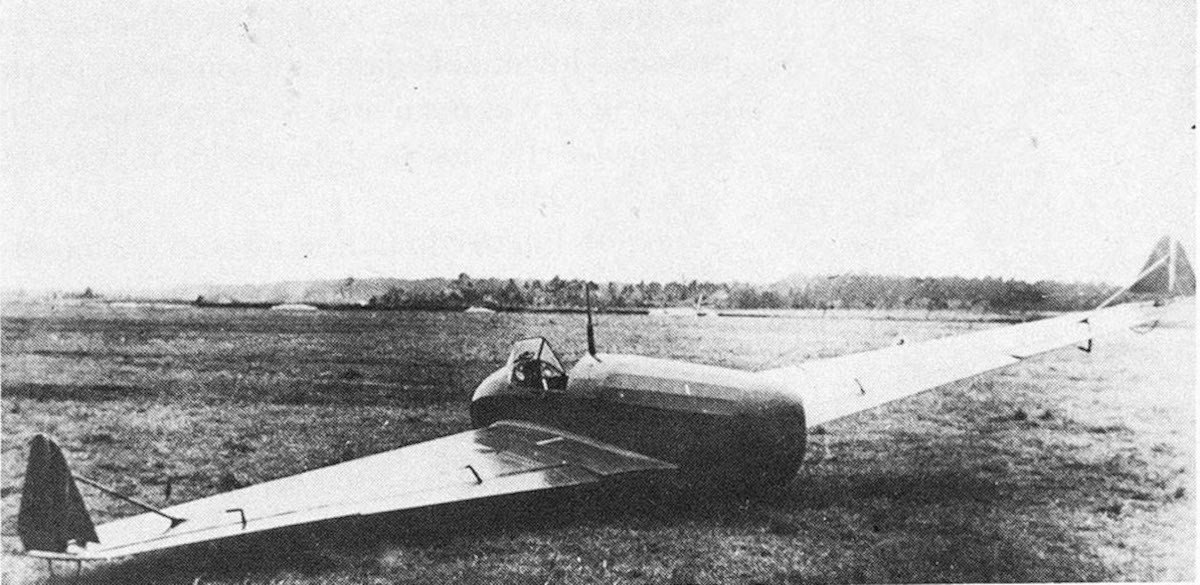

General information
- Type: Research glider
- National origin: Japan
- Manufacturer: Kayaba Industry
- Designer: Hidemasa Kimura
- Number built: 1

History
- First flight: October 1940

The Kayaba Ku-2 (萱場 2型無尾翼滑空機) was a glider built in Japan in 1940 to investigate the possibilities of tailless aircraft. It was developed as part of an Imperial Japanese Army contract that had been offered to designer Hidemasa Kimura following the successful flights of his HK-1 tailless glider over the previous years.

== History ==
Developed with the help of the Kayaba Industry's chief designer Shigeki Naito, the Ku-2 had a swept wing with two vertical fins at the end of the wings. The Ku-2 flew 262 test flights between October 1940 and May 1941 before being damaged beyond repair in a crash.

== Specifications ==
General characteristics

- Crew: One pilot
- Length: 3.04 m (10 ft 0 in)
- Wingspan: 9.80 m (32 ft 2 in)
- Wing area: 14.5 m^{2} (156 sq ft)

Performance

- Maximum speed: 75 km/h (47 mph, 41 kn)

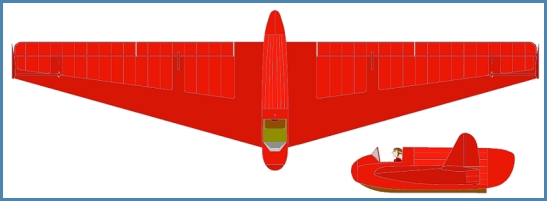
