= Keith-Lucas =

Keith-Lucas is a surname. This surname was used by three brothers in honour of their father Keith Lucas:

- Alan Keith-Lucas (1910–1995), social worker and professor
- David Keith-Lucas (1911–1997), aeronautical engineer
  - Sarah Keith-Lucas (born 1982), BBC weather presenter, granddaughter of David
- Bryan Keith-Lucas (1912–1996), political scientist

== See also ==
- Keith Lucas (disambiguation)
- Keith (surname)
- Lucas (surname)
