= Short Sturgeon =

Post war British target tug

Sturgeon
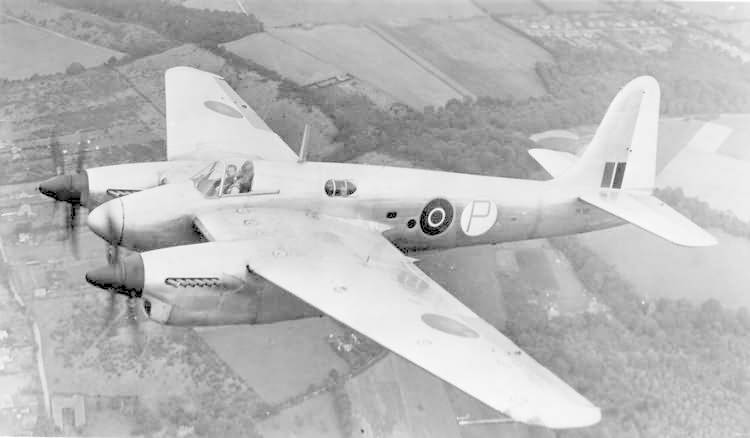
- Sturgeon Mk.1 torpedo bomber prototype

General information
- Type: Torpedo bomber Reconnaissance bomber Target tug Anti-submarine aircraft
- Manufacturer: Short Brothers
- Primary user: Fleet Air Arm
- Number built: 28

History
- First flight: 7 June 1946

The Short Sturgeon was a planned British carrier-borne reconnaissance bomber whose development began during Second World War with the S.6/43 requirement for a high-performance torpedo bomber, which was later refined into the S.11/43 requirement which was won by the Sturgeon. With the end of the war in the Pacific production of the aircraft carriers from which the Sturgeon was intended to operate was suspended and the original reconnaissance bomber specification was cancelled.

The Sturgeon was then redesigned as a target tug which saw service with the fleet for a number of years. Later, the basic Sturgeon design was reworked as a prototype anti-submarine aircraft. The many modifications that resulted turned the promising design into a "hapless and grotesque-looking hybrid."

== Design and development ==
The development process leading to the S.38 Sturgeon began with the 1943 S.6/43 requirement for a high-performance torpedo bomber with a bomb bay that could accommodate six 500-pound (230 kg) bombs or any of the current standard aerial torpedoes, operating from Audacious and Centaur-class aircraft carriers. A maximum all-up-weight of 24,000 lb (11,000 kg) was specified. Short Brothers were not invited to respond to S.6/43, but the preliminary responses from the other participating manufacturers indicated that a twin-engined design meeting all requirements was likely to weigh in excess of 24,000 lbs, while a single-engined design was unlikely to exceed the performance of in-service aircraft.

S.6/43 was allowed to proceed, and there are indications that Shorts submitted two uninvited tenders, a single-engined Bristol Centaurus design and a twin-Rolls-Royce Merlin design. However, none of the original S.6/43 submissions was adopted and no reference to the Shorts submissions has been located in the official documentation. Focus instead shifted to splitting the requirements, with the torpedo bomber requirement becoming O.5/43, eventually leading to the Fairey Spearfish, while S.11/43 was written for a reconnaissance aircraft able to operate as a bomber.

Specification S.11/43 called for the design and construction of a twin-engine naval reconnaissance aircraft for visual and photographic reconnaissance and shadowing, by day or night, and also able to operate as a bomber. The specification included a maximum all-up weight of 24,000 lb, height (stowed) of 17 ft (5.2 m), length of 45 ft (13.7 m) and a wingspan of 60 ft (18.3 m) (spread) / 20 ft (6.1 m) (folded). Powered wing-folding was also required.

Shorts submitted the twin-Merlin S.38 Sturgeon as their tender to S.11/43, while Armstrong Whitworth proposed the twin-Merlin powered AW.54. After the AW.54 was criticized for lack of power, the AW.54A with two MetroVick F.3 turbojets was submitted. Submissions were also made by Blackburn and Fairey (also with twin-Merlin designs) and by Westland with a mixed-power design comprising a Pratt & Whitney R-4360 Wasp Major radial in the nose and a Halford H.1 turbojet in the tail. On 19 October 1943, Shorts received the "Instruction to Proceed" and an order for three prototypes designated Sturgeon S.1, with military serials RK787, RK791 and RK794 assigned. The final tailored S.11/43 requirements followed in February 1944.

The pilot's cockpit was a sub-assembly bolted to the front of the spar, placing him level with the leading edge of the wing, the navigator was behind the centre section of the wing and the radio operator — separated from the navigator by his equipment — behind him. The navigator and radio operator entered through a door, which acted as a ladder when opened, in the starboard side with their seats being offset to port. The cameras were installed in the fuselage behind the radio operator. One of the Sturgeon's unfortunate failings was in placement of controls. The fire extinguisher switch was located next to the cockpit switches required for firing the engine starter cartridges, resulting in some inadvertent mishaps and some unintended hilarity for ground crews.

Armament would be two 0.5 in (12.7 mm) Browning machine guns in the nose with a 1,000-pound (450 kg) bomb or two 500-pound bombs or four 250-pound (110 kg) depth charges carried in the bomb bay and 16 underwing 60-pound (27 kg) RP-3 rockets carried under the wings. ASV radar was fitted and two F.52 cameras and a single F.24 camera were carried for the reconnaissance role. Normal fuel load was 410 imperial gallons (1,900 L; 490 US gal), but for reconnaissance missions a 180-imperial-gallon (820 L; 220 US gal) long-range fuel tank could be carried in the bomb bay.

The first Short Sturgeon I RK787 flew at Rochester Airport on 7 June 1946, proving to have excellent handling and appearing at Farnborough in July. By this time, Shorts had adopted the S.B.A.C universal designation system and the S.38 was re-designated the S.A.1. Deck landing trials were successfully completed in 1947. The contract was reassigned from Short Brothers to Short Brothers & Harland and the incomplete aircraft were moved to Belfast where the second prototype, RK791, flew from Sydenham, Belfast on 18 May 1948. RK791 competed in the Air League Challenge Cup Race of 1949 with an average speed of 295 mph.

With the end of the Second World War and the suspension of the Audacious and Centaur-class carriers the Royal Navy no longer had the platforms from which the Sturgeon was intended to operate and the requirement for the Sturgeon S.1 was cancelled. The production order for 30 aircraft was reduced to 23 and changed to a variant reworked under Q.1/46 to accommodate a largely shore-based target tug role as the S.39 (later re-indexed as the S.A.2) Sturgeon TT.2. The third prototype, RK794, was completed to TT.2 standard with a new serial, VR363.

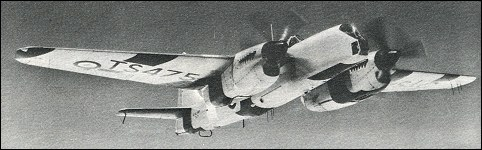
Sturgeon TT.2

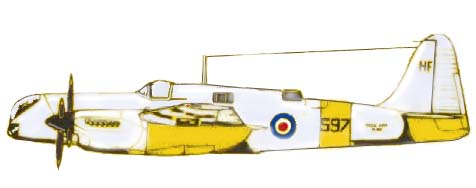
Sturgeon TT.2

The TT.2 was a large, but clean-looking twin-engined, mid-wing cantilever monoplane design with a distinctively elongated glazed nose in its target tug configuration. The all-metal monocoque fuselage was built in four sections ending at a cantilever tailplane with single fin and rudder. Rudder and tailplanes were fabric covered. The wing design featured a swept leading edge and taper on outboard sections, and wing folds outboard of the twin Merlin 140 engines driving contra-rotating propellers (which allowed shorter blades and the Merlins to be mounted closer to the centreline). The main wheels retracted rearwards into the engine nacelles while the tail wheel retracted forwards into the fuselage. Radiators were mounted in the leading edge between the nacelles and the fuselage.

The Sturgeon's post-war role began as a naval liaison and target tug aircraft with modifications to the nose, lengthened to provide a manned camera position forward of the propeller arcs, and a winch system. The crew of two included the pilot and the all-purpose "observer" who had to perform the functions of navigator, wireless operator, target operator and camera operator, for which the fuselage was deepened to allow the observer to crawl beneath the pilot's position, moving between stations in the nose and rear fuselage. In 1953, with the abandonment of throw-off target practice, the requirement for the camera nose disappeared and five TT.2s were converted into the S.B.9 Sturgeon TT.3 variant with a nose profile similar to that of the S.1.

The penultimate and last Sturgeons were rebuilt in 1949 as prototypes for the S.B.3, a proposed anti-submarine aircraft to M.6/49, powered by two Armstrong Siddeley Mamba AS Ma3 turboprops of 1,147 shaft horsepower (855 kW) driving two four-bladed propellers. The engine exhausts were directed downwards instead of to the rear. Another major modification was the grafting on of a gigantic bulbous nose that housed two radar operators in stations forward of the engines and the radar itself, below. Acute problems arising from the modifications led to the demise of the project, namely, "the efflux from the Mamba turboprops seriously destabilized the aircraft at some power settings and destroyed the good handling characteristics. It proved impossible to trim for safe flight on one engine which was a necessity for long endurance on anti-submarine patrols."

Short SB.3 ASW variant (WF632)

Two S.B.3 prototypes were ordered with the first, WF632 flying on 8 December 1950 at Belfast. The design proved extremely difficult to trim when flying on one engine and so unstable that no effort was made to resolve these problems; consequently, the project was cancelled before the second prototype, WF636 flew. Both aircraft had very short lives, being scrapped in 1951.

== Operational history ==
The main production variant, the TT.2 naval target tug spent most of its life with No. 728 Squadron at Hal Far, Malta. The type was also operated by No. 771 Squadron at RNAS Ford in 1950–1954. Their primary role as a target tug included towing targets for ground-to-air firing practice, photographic marking of ground-to-air firing, target towing for air-to-air practice by night and day, "throw-off" target practice and radar calibration.

All existing Sturgeon TT.2s were planned to be modified to a TT.3 standard during the early 1950s, however the conversion programme was halted after five aircraft. The extended TT.2 nose with its synchronised photographic equipment and crew station was removed and replaced by a smaller streamlined nose cone. With the change from carrier operations to ground bases, all deck-landing equipment was also eliminated as well as the wing being modified to have a manual folding gear in place of the TT.2's hydraulic system.

One TT.2 (VR363), piloted by "Jock" Eassie, was briefly utilised as a glider tug in flight tests of the Short SB.1. This experimental "tailless" glider, designed by David Keith-Lucas and Professor Geoffrey T. R. Hill, was built by Shorts as a private research venture to test the concept of the aero-isoclinic wing. The first towed launch of the SB.1 piloted by Shorts' Chief Test Pilot, Tom Brooke-Smith, took off from RAF Aldergrove on 30 July 1951. The SB.1 was towed behind to a 10,000 ft altitude with the flight completed successfully.

On the second flight of the day, the tow rope was extended and Brooke-Smith experienced the problems inherent in flying a light aircraft in the turbulence caused by the towing aircraft. Brooke-Smith had to cast off at low altitude and while attempting to side-slip out of the wake, struck the ground "nose-down" at 90 mph, injuring himself seriously and damaging the aircraft. With the extensive damage to the Short SB.1 necessitating a rebuild, the decision to power the modified glider (redesignated the Short SB.4 Sherpa) meant the end of the use of the Sturgeon tow aircraft in the programme.

== Variants ==
=== Sturgeon S.1 ===
Carrier-borne strike aircraft, one completed at Shorts, Rochester before production moved to Belfast. Three prototypes were ordered but the third was completed as the TT.2 prototype. The production contract for 30 S.1s to build at Rochester was cancelled.

=== Sturgeon TT.2 ===
Target tugs, two prototypes and 23 production aircraft ordered to be built at Belfast; some later converted to the TT.3 standard.

=== Sturgeon TT.3 ===
Revised target tug variant, five modified at Rochester from TT.2s.

=== S.B.3 ===
Prototype anti-submarine aircraft built in Belfast. Two prototypes ordered with the first flying on 12 August 1950 and then demonstrated at the 1950 Society of British Aerospace Companies' (SBAC) Farnborough Airshow; the second example was completed but never flown.

=== Jet Sturgeon night fighter ===
Drawings exist for a Sturgeon variant modified with two Rolls Royce AJ.40 turbofans in place of the Merlins and armed with four 20 mm Hispano cannon. This was linked to the 1945 decision by the Assistant Chief of the Naval Staff (Air) to order the evaluation of a Sturgeon night fighter derivative with improved performance as a low-risk alternative to the development of the De Havilland Sea Hornet NF.21 under N.21/45. As the Sea Hornet NF.21 was successful, no detailed development followed.

== Operators ==
=== United Kingdom ===
- Royal Navy, Fleet Air Arm
  - 703 Naval Air Squadron
  - 728 Naval Air Squadron
  - 771 Naval Air Squadron

== Specifications (Short S.B.9 Sturgeon TT.3) ==
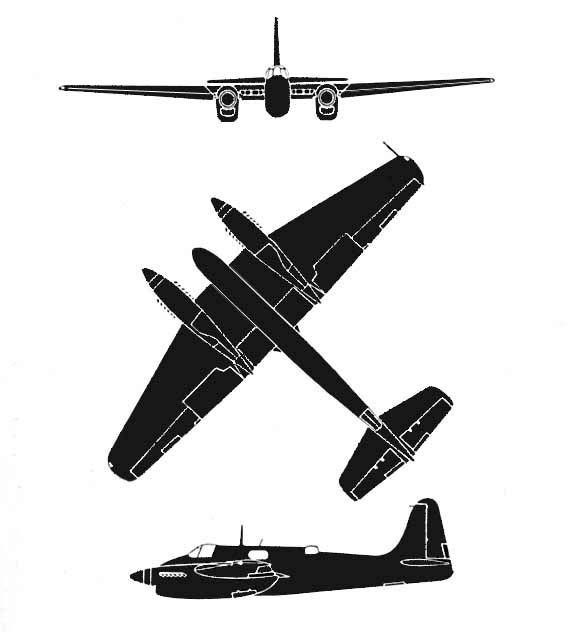

Data from The World's Worst Aircraft., The Aircraft of the World,

General characteristics

- Crew: 3
- Length: 44 ft (13 m)
- Wingspan: 59 ft 11 in (18.26 m)
- Height: 13 ft 2 1/2 in (4.026 m)
- Wing area: 518.4 sq ft (48.16 m^{2})
- Aspect ratio: 6.4
- Airfoil: root:NACA 64_{2}215.3; tip:NACA 64_{2}215.6
- Empty weight: 16,967 lb (7,696 kg)
- Gross weight: 18,126 lb (8,222 kg)
- Max takeoff weight: 21,700 lb (9,843 kg)
- Fuel capacity: 410 imp gal (490 US gal; 1,900 L) fuel in four wing tanks, plus an optional auxiliary bomb bay tank of 180 imp gal (220 US gal; 820 L); 22 imp gal (26 US gal; 100 L) oil per engine
- Powerplant: 2 × Rolls-Royce Merlin 140 V-12 liquid-cooled piston engines, 2,080 hp (1,550 kW) each at 2,000 ft (610 m)
- Propellers: 6-bladed Rotol, 10 ft (3.0 m) diameter contra-rotating constant-speed fully feathering propellers with wooden blades

Performance

- Maximum speed: 366 mph (589 km/h, 318 kn)
- Cruise speed: 312 mph (502 km/h, 271 kn)
- Range: 1,600 mi (2,600 km, 1,400 nmi)
- Service ceiling: 35,200 ft (10,700 m)
- Rate of climb: 2,330 ft/min (11.8 m/s)

== See also ==
Aircraft of comparable role, configuration, and era

- Bristol Brigand
- de Havilland Hornet
- Grumman XTB2F
- Grumman XTSF

Related lists

- List of aircraft of the Fleet Air Arm
- List of carrier-based aircraft

== Bibliography ==
- Barnes, C. H. Shorts Aircraft Since 1900. London: Putnam Aeronautical Books, 1989. ISBN 0-85177-819-4
- Buttler, Tony. "Anti-Submarine Insurance: The Portly Short SB.3". Air Enthusiast No. 107, September/October 2003. pp. 70–73. ISSN 0143-5450
- Buttler, Tony (November–December 1999). "A Near Class Act: Shorts' Frustrated Sturgeion". Air Enthusiast (84): 66–71. ISSN 0143-5450.
- Buttler, Tony. British Secret Projects: Fighters and Bombers 1935–1950. Leicester, UK: Midland Publishing, 2004. ISBN 1-85780-179-2
- Buttler, Tony. X-Planes of Europe II: Military Prototype Aircraft from the Golden Age 1946–1974. Manchester, UK: Hikoki Publications, 2015. ISBN 978-1-90210-948-0
- Green, William and Gerald Pollinger. The Aircraft of the World. London: Macdonald, 1955.
- Gunston, Bill. "Short's Experimental Sherpa." Aeroplane Monthly, Vol. 5, no. 10, October 1977, pp. 508–515
- Gunston, Bill. "Sturgeon." Aeroplane Monthly, Volume 6, No. 10, October 1978.
- "Short Sturgeon." Flight, 17 October 1946, pp. 422–425
- Sturtivant, Ray and Theo Balance. The Squadrons of the Fleet Air Arm. Tonbridge, Kent, UK: Air Britain (Historians), 1994. ISBN 0-85130-223-8
- Warner, Guy (July–August 2002). "From Bombay to Bombardier: Aircraft Production at Sydenham, Part One". Air Enthusiast. No. 100. pp. 13–24. ISSN 0143-5450.
- Winchester, Jim, ed. "Short Sturgeon". The World's Worst Aircraft: From Pioneering Failures to Multimillion Dollar Disasters. London: Amber Books, 2005. ISBN 1-904687-34-2
