= Society of British Aerospace Companies =

UK trade association

- Formerly: Society of British Aircraft Constructors (1915-1964)
- Industry: Aerospace
- Founded: 1915
- Defunct: October 2009
- Fate: Merged with Defence Manufacturers Association and Association of Police and Public Security Suppliers to form ADS Group

The Society of British Aerospace Companies (SBAC, formerly Society of British Aircraft Constructors) was the UK's national trade association representing companies supplying civil air transport, aerospace defence, homeland security and space. As of October 2009 SBAC merged with the Defence Manufacturers Association and the Association of Police and Public Security Suppliers to form the ADS Group.

The SBAC organises the Farnborough Airshow.

== Representation ==
With its regional partners, SBAC represents over 2,600 companies, assisting them in developing new business globally, facilitating innovation and competitiveness and providing regulatory services in technical standards and accreditation. Inside the organisation is the British Aviation Group and the UK Space Agency.

== History ==
=== Formation ===
On 29 March 1915 a number of British aircraft manufacturers and industrialists met to arrange a standards body and production pooling system known as the Society of British Aircraft Constructors. Notable among the aircraft participants were Herbert Austin, Frederick Handley Page, H.V. Roe of Avro, and E.B. Parker of Short Brothers. The group agreed to share their designs among a variety of 3rd party factories in order to be able to quickly produce new designs on demand. These factories joined ones being run by the government directly. In total over 40 companies joined the group when it officially formed on 23 March 1916.

=== Aircraft inspection ===
In the post-war era the group expanded to include almost every aircraft company and those related to it—engine manufacturers, metal alloy companies, etc. Since this period they have often been referred to by acronym, SBAC. They were also instrumental in approaching Lloyd's of London to start the inspection and insurance of aircraft, which led to increased commercial aviation.

=== Trade and air shows ===
In 1932 the group hosted a one-day air show and trade fair at the Hendon airfield in London on 19 June, the day after the annual RAF Hendon display. Similar one-day events were held for the next three years, but 1935 was the last Hendon RAF display. The SBAC show moved to de Havilland's Hatfield airfield in 1936 and 1937; the latter was both the first two-day SBAC show and the last before World War II. Immediately after the War it was held at Radlett, the home of Handley Page on 12–13 September, and early September became the regular date. In 1947 the show was again at Radlett with three flying days. In 1948 the meeting was moved to the Royal Aircraft Establishment at Farnborough and was six days long with three flying days, setting the pattern for the future.

The Farnborough shows were held annually as trade fairs for British manufacturers and with two public days, the Saturday and Sunday, throughout the 1950s. Crowds were large: on the last day, the Sunday of the 1954 show some 160,000 people attended. In 1962 the British-only rule was slightly relaxed by allowing the participation of foreign aircraft with British engines. 1962 was also the last of the annual shows, the next being held in 1964 and thenceforth biennially; in 1968 European manufacturers were invited. In 1974 the show accepted international participation and from 1978 it became known as the Farnborough International. Since 1964 the Farnborough has alternated with the Paris Air Show.

=== Name change ===
The name changed from "Society of British Aircraft Constructors" to "Society of British Aerospace Companies" in 1964.

== Affiliated organisations ==
SBAC Scotland was formed in 2005.

== SBAC aircraft designations ==
After WWII the SBAC introduced a designation system for British aircraft consisting of a two letter manufacturer code followed by a sequence number, with designations allocated as follows:-

=== Blackburn Aircraft ===
- Blackburn Y.A.1 The Blackburn B-48 Firecrest to Air Ministry Specification S.28/43.
- Blackburn Y.A.2 Design study only.
- Blackburn Y.A.3 Design study only.
- Blackburn Y.A.4 B-55 project for a Rolls-Royce Dart powered 24-seat commercial aircraft.
- Blackburn Y.A.5 Blackburn B-54 anti-submarine two-seater to Specification GR.17/45 with Napier Double Nomad.
- Blackburn Y.A.6 B-62 project for a Blackburn Firecrest with Armstrong Siddeley Python engine.
- Blackburn Y.A.7 Two-seater Y.A.5 with Rolls-Royce Griffon 56.
- Blackburn Y.A.8 Three-seater Y.A.5 with RR Griffon 56.
- Blackburn Y.A.9 The 1947 B-75 feeder-liner with two Blackburn Cirrus Majors or Blackburn Cirrus Bombardiers.
- Blackburn Y.B.1 Blackburn B-54 - the Y.A.8 with Armstrong Siddeley Double Mamba turboprop engine.
- Blackburn Y.B.2 The Handley Page HP.88 research aircraft with Supermarine Attacker fuselage and Handley Page Victor scale model crescent wing.
- Blackburn Y.B.3 The B-103 Blackburn Buccaneer, to Specification NA.39, low-level strike aircraft.

=== Gloster ===
- Gloster G.A.1 Gloster E.1/44 "Gloster Ace" fighter (1948).
- Gloster G.A.2 A developed Gloster Ace.
- Gloster G.A.3 intended pre-production for GA.4
- Gloster G.A.4 production ordered but not built
- Gloster G.A.5 Gloster Javelin interceptor fighter.

=== English Electric ===
- English Electric E.A.1 English Electric Canberra B Mk.1.
- English Electric E.A.2 English Electric Canberra PR Mk.3.
- English Electric E.A.3 English Electric Canberra B Mk.2.
- English Electric E.A.4 English Electric Canberra.

=== Saunders-Roe ===
(confirmation required)

- Saunders-Roe SR.A.1 S.44 flying boat fighter.
- Saunders-Roe SR.N.1 Hovercraft.
- Saunders-Roe SR.N.2 Hovercraft.
- Saunders-Roe SR.N.3 Hovercraft.
- Saunders-Roe SR.N.4 Hovercraft.
- Saunders-Roe SR.N.5 Hovercraft.
- Saunders-Roe SR.N.6 Hovercraft.

=== Shorts ===
- Shorts S.A.1 Short Sturgeon PR Mk.1 carrier-borne torpedo bomber/reconnaissance aircraft.
- Shorts S.A.2 Shorts S.39 Sturgeon TT Mk.2 target tug to Specification Q.1/46.
- Shorts S.A.3 Short S.41 (1946) naval fighter project to Specification N7/46.
- Shorts S.A.4 Short Sperrin four engined jet bomber to Specification B.14/46.
- Shorts S.A.5 Short S.43.
- Shorts S.A.6 Short Sealand patrol flying boat.
- Shorts S.A.7 Short S.46 (flying boat) commercial Flying Boat Project.
- Shorts S.A.8 Short S.47 (flying boat) commercial Flying Boat Project.
- Shorts S.A.9 Short S.48 (glider) military glider to Specification X.30/46.
- Shorts S.B.1 A scale research glider.
- Shorts S.B.2 Short Sealand II amphibian
- Shorts S.B.3 Short Sturgeon based carrier-borne anti-submarine aircraft.
- Shorts S.B.4 Short SB.4 Sherpa experimental aero-isoclinic wing research aircraft.
- Short S.B.5 A swept wing research aircraft for development of the English Electric Lightning.
- Shorts S.B.6 Short Seamew AS Mk.1 single engined carrier-borne anti-submarine aircraft for the Fleet Air Arm (in-house P.D.4).
- Shorts S.B.7 Short Sealand III amphibian.
- Shorts S.B.8 design offered for Specification HR.144T for an ultra-light helicopter project.
- Shorts S.B.9 Short Sturgeon TT Mk.3 carrier-borne target-tug aircraft.
- Shorts S.C.1 An experimental fixed-wing vertical take-off and landing (VTOL) aircraft (in-house P.D.11).
- Shorts S.C.2 Short Seamew AS Mk.2 for Royal Air Force Coastal Command.
- Shorts S.C.3 (in-house P.D.16)..
- Shorts S.C.4 Target drone aircraft converted from English Electric Canberra B Mk.2 bombers
- Shorts S.C.5 Short Belfast C Mk.1 heavy lift turboprop freighter .
- Shorts S.C.6
- Shorts S.C.7 The Short Skyvan transport (in-house P.D.36).
- Shorts S.C.8 A development of the Short SC.1 (in-house P.D.43).
- Shorts S.C.9 A Shorts-built English Electric Canberra PR Mk.9 converted with AI.23 radar plus IR installations in nose for Red Top trials.
- Shorts S.D.1 - a single Canberra modified to test Short SD.2
- Shorts S.D.2 A licence built Beech Model-1072 target drone.
- Shorts S.D.3 Short 330 developed from the Shorts Skyvan and developed into the Short 360.

=== Westland Aircraft ===
- WA** - Westland Aircraft Type xxx

== See also ==
- UK Space Agency
- Royal Aeronautical Society
