= Keith Lucas =

Keith Lucas may refer to:

- Keith Lucas (neuroscientist) (1879–1916), British scientist
- Keith Lucas (comedian) (born 1985), British comedian, one half of The Lucas Brothers
- Keith Lucas (racing driver), racing driver in the 1953 NASCAR Grand National Series

== See also ==
- Keith-Lucas (surname), surname used by the three sons of scientist Keith Lucas
