= Short SB.1 =

SB.1
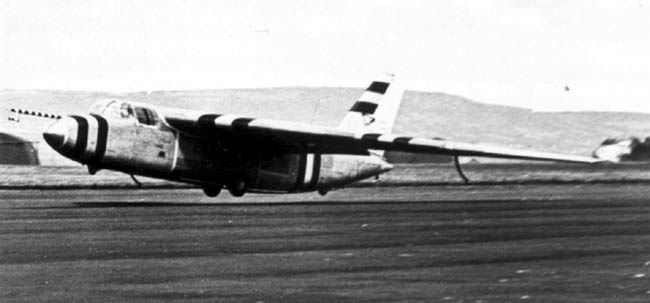
- Short SB.1 during landing c.1951

General information
- Type: Experimental glider
- Manufacturer: Short Brothers
- Designer: David Keith-Lucas
- Status: Company experimental project
- Number built: 1

History
- First flight: 14 July 1951
- Variants: Short SB.4 Sherpa

The Short SB.1 was a British tailless glider designed by David Keith-Lucas and Professor Geoffrey T.R. Hill. Built by Shorts as a private research venture to test the concept of the aero-isoclinic wing, it was the first aircraft to incorporate this feature.

It was in effect a one-third scale glider version of Keith-Lucas' ambitious preliminary design P.D.1, intended to meet the Air Ministry's (V bomber) specification B.35/46, which was the basis for the Avro Vulcan, the Handley-Page Victor and the Vickers Valiant.

== Design and development ==
After extensive testing with wind-tunnel and flutter models, the design team proposed that a manned glider be built. Shorts (Belfast) undertook construction on a single-seat glider incorporating the "aero-isoclinic" wing originated by Professor Hill. This radical wing configuration was designed to maintain a constant angle of incidence regardless of flexing, by placing the torsion box well back in the wing so that the air loads, acting in the region of the quarter-chord line, have a considerable moment arm about it. The torsional instability and tip stalling characteristics of conventional swept wings were recognized at the time, together with their tendency to aileron-reversal and flutter at high speed. It was to prevent these effects that the aero-isoclinic wing was designed.

The SB.1 glider was designed to be an inexpensive, simple machine, constructed primarily of spruce with reinforced sections using light alloy steel. The all-important wing controls had "elevons" pivoted on long, tapered light-alloy tubes extending from the leading edge of the tip, just inside the fixed part of the wing (illustrated by photographs in the Short SB.4 Sherpa article). The pivoting mechanism had a double-ball bearing unit on the inboard end with main loads transferred to a needle roller bearing at the outboard end of the fixed wing. Anti-balance tabs were fitted along trailing edges along with small pneumatically actuated flaps under the inboard sections. When the elevons were rotated in the same direction they functioned as elevators; when rotated in opposite directions they functioned as ailerons.

== Testing ==
After final construction at Aldersgrove, the Shorts SB.1 bearing Class B registration G-14-5 was readied for flight testing early July 1951. For the first flight on 14 July 1951, the SB1 was winch-launched and the gliding characteristics were found by Shorts' Chief Test Pilot Tom Brooke-Smith ("Brookie") to be satisfactory.

A further successful test flight on 15 July 1951 was followed by the first towed launch from RAF Aldergrove on 30 July 1951. The SB.1 was towed behind a Short Sturgeon TT2 (VR363) piloted by "Jock" Eassie to a height of 10,000 ft, the height of the release. Although Brooke-Smith experienced turbulence inherent in flying a light aircraft in the wake of the towing aircraft, the subsequent test flight was completed successfully. During the second flight of the day (using a longer towline intended to alleviate the turbulence), the test pilot encountered severe buffeting problems and he had to cast off at low altitude. The flight ended catastrophically when Brooke-Smith attempted to side-slip out of the wake and struck the ground "nose-down" at 90 mph, injuring himself seriously and heavily damaging the aircraft.

During his recovery, Brooke-Smith expressed concerns about the towed launches and was adamant that testing the SB.1 required a new approach. The Shorts company persevered with the project, redesigning the aircraft six months later. The new design retained the wings and tail of the SB.1 but (at Tom Brooke-Smith's insistence) featured two small turbojet engines housed in a new, light-alloy fuselage. The result was the Short SB.4 Sherpa.

== Specifications (SB.1) ==
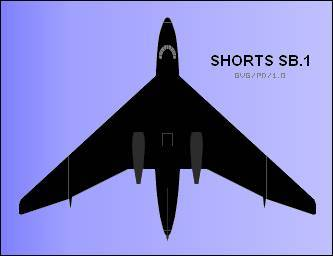
Plan view of SB.1

Data from

General characteristics

- Crew: 1
- Wingspan: 38 ft 0 in (11.58 m)
- Wing area: 229.9 sq ft (21.36 m^{2})
- Leading-edge sweep: 42.25°

Performance

== See also ==
Related development

- Short SB.4 Sherpa

== Bibliography ==
- Buttler, Tony (May–June 1999). "Control at the Tips: Aero-isoclinics and Their Influence on Design". Air Enthusiast (81): 50–55. ISSN 0143-5450.
- Buttler, Tony and Jean-Louis Delezenne. X-Planes of Europe: Secret Research Aircraft from the Golden Age 1946-1974. Manchester, UK: Hikoki Publications, 2012. ISBN 978-1-902-10921-3
- Barnes, C.H. with revisions by James, Derek N. Shorts Aircraft since 1900. London: Putnam, 1989 (revised). ISBN 0-85177-819-4.
- Gunston, Bill. "Short's Experimental Sherpa." Aeroplane Monthly Vol. 5, no. 10, October 1977. p. 508–515.
- Short SB4 Sherpa RAF (EJA18c philatelic cover). Croydon, Surrey, UK: Aviation Collectibles. Access date: 1 February 2007.
- Warner, Guy (July–August 2002). "From Bombay to Bombardier: Aircraft Production at Sydenham, Part One". Air Enthusiast. No. 100. pp. 13–24. ISSN 0143-5450.
