= Short Sherpa =

Two aircraft built by Short Brothers have been named Sherpa:

- Short SB.4 Sherpa, a jet-powered experimental wing research aircraft, first flight 1953
- Short C-23 Sherpa, military version of the Short 330 and 360 turboprop powered transport aircraft, introduced 1985
