= Archaeopteryx (disambiguation) =

In addition to the extinct genus Archaeopteryx, the term can refer to the following subjects:

== Science ==
- Specimens of Archaeopteryx
- 9860 Archaeopteryx - a main belt asteroid
- Archaeopteryx (software) - a phylogenetic tree software

== Technology ==
- Granger Archaeopteryx - a British semi-tailless aeroplane of the 1930s
- Ruppert Archaeopteryx - a Swiss foot-launched sailplane

== Culture ==
- Ubu cocu, ou l'Archéopteryx - an 1897 play by Alfred Jarry
- Arc'teryx - an outdoor clothing and sporting goods brand
- "Archaeopteryx", a song in the album Dinosaurchestra by American band Lemon Demon
- Archaeopteryx, an album by German producer Monolake
