= Westland-Hill Pterodactyl =

Experimental aircraft series by G. T. R. Hill

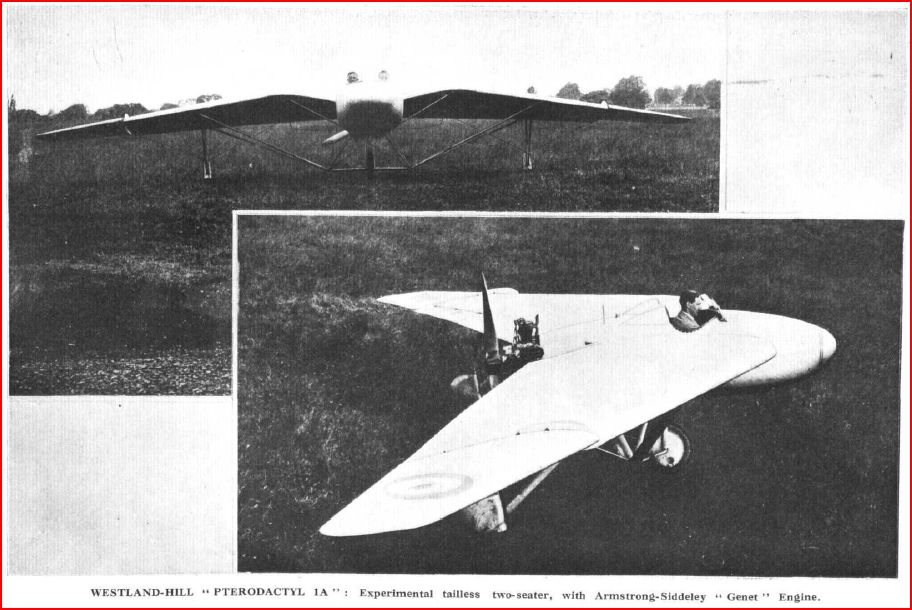
Pterodactyl IA 1928)

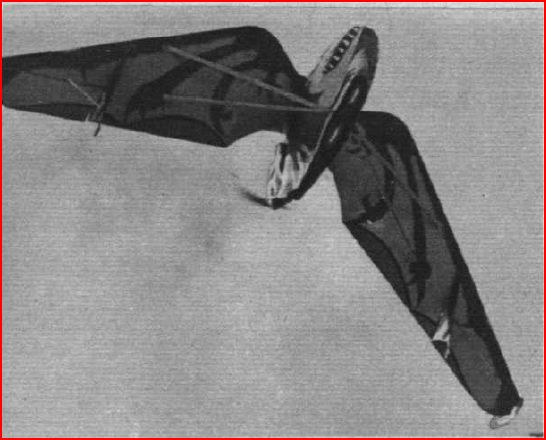
Pterodactyl IV at Hendon Aerodrome show in 1928. Note the reptile-like paint scheme

Pterodactyl was the name given to a series of experimental tailless aircraft designs developed by G. T. R. Hill in the 1920s and early 1930s. Named after the genus Pterodactylus, a well-known type of pterosaur commonly known as the pterodactyl, all but the first were produced by Westland Aircraft Ltd after Hill joined them.

== History ==
Captain G. T. R. Hill developed the Pterodactyl series in an attempt to develop a safer aircraft: many pilots lost their lives when their aircraft stalled, went into a spin and flew into the ground, and Hill wanted to develop a design which was resistant to stalling and spinning. The pioneer J. W. Dunne had previously developed stable aircraft in the form of tailless swept wings and Hill took Dunne's ideas as his starting point.

Helped by his wife, he constructed a prototype which was flown as a glider in 1924. The design gained official interest and in 1925 it was fitted with a 35 h.p. Bristol Cherub engine and taken to Farnborough. It was later demonstrated to the Secretary of State for Air, Sir Samuel Hoare.

All subsequent examples were funded under Air Ministry contract and built by Westland Aircraft, who took on Hill for this purpose. The first Westland-built type, the Pterodactyl I, was built to Air Ministry Specification 23/26. It took the form of a braced shoulder-wing monoplane with fully moving wingtips and a single pusher propeller. If both tips were moved in the same way they functioned as elevators, in opposite ways then as ailerons. It was designated the Mk. IA or IB according to which engine was fitted. It and subsequent models flew initially from RAF Andover, the Mk. IA flying in 1928.

The Mks II and III failed to gain Ministry acceptance.

The next model to be built was a three-seat cabin monoplane to Ministry Specification 16/29, in which the all-moving tips were replaced by conventional ailerons. An unusual feature was the use of variable wing sweep to provide longitudinal trim. Designated the Mk. IV, it first flew in 1931.

The final Westland-built variant, the Mk. V, flew the next year, in 1932. Built to Ministry specification F.3/32, it was a two-seat fighter powered by a 600 h.p. Rolls-Royce Goshawk engine and differing noticeably from the previous versions in having a sesquiplane lower wing and tractor propeller. The lower wing was unswept and of short span, and braced to the upper wing. The forward propeller position, together with the tailless wing configuration, gave the rear gun turret an outstanding field of fire. Despite its performance and flyability in other respects rivalling its conventional competitor the Hawker Hart it was not accepted for production.

Associated with the Mk. V was a complementary Mk. VI design for a pusher variant with front-mounted gun turret, and the intention was to fly a mixed squadron with front-firing machines leading and rear-firing machines behind, but the Pterodactyl programme was cancelled before any order for the Mk, VI had been received.

At the time of cancellation, wind tunnel models of a Mk. VII four-engined reconnaissance seaplane had been tested, and a proposal for a Mk. VIII transatlantic airliner was being worked on.

After World War II, Hill helped develop the similar NRC tailless glider in Canada. Returning to England, he developed the aero-isoclinic wing and helped Short Brothers develop the Short SB.1 and SB.4 tailless swept-wing test aircraft.

== Design characteristics ==
Hill's Pterodactyl designs were all intended to handle safely without any definite stall point, allowing reliable recovery without loss of altitude even by inexperienced pilots. The characteristic wing was of moderately tapered and swept planform, with reverse taper at the root to improve pilot vision.

The wing was "washed out", having a slight twist which reduced the angle of incidence progressively towards the tips, providing a near-stationary overall centre of pressure and ensuring that the aircraft was stable in pitch. Thus, no horizontal stabiliser was needed and the craft was tailless, allowing the fuselage to be relatively short.

Early examples used a patented system in which the wingtips pivoted to act as slab elevons providing control in pitch and roll, while later types had more conventional elevons in the wing trailing edge.

Yaw stability was generally achieved by vertical fins, and control by vertical rudders, but the exact arrangement varied between types and even during the flight testing of individual machines. The Mk. I differed in having horizontal "electroscope rudders" on the trailing edge, (Note: These were spoilers that operated by the split trailing edge opening symmetrically, in the V-shaped manner of a gold-leaf electroscope.) inboard of the movable wingtips, which acted to provide differential drag. The IA had no vertical surfaces but small fixed fins were added to the IB.

== Aircraft ==
Pterodactyl
Glider, built by G. T. R. Hill and his wife in 1926; later fitted with Bristol Cherub engine in cooperation with the Air Ministry and test-flown at Farnborough.

- Pterodactyl I
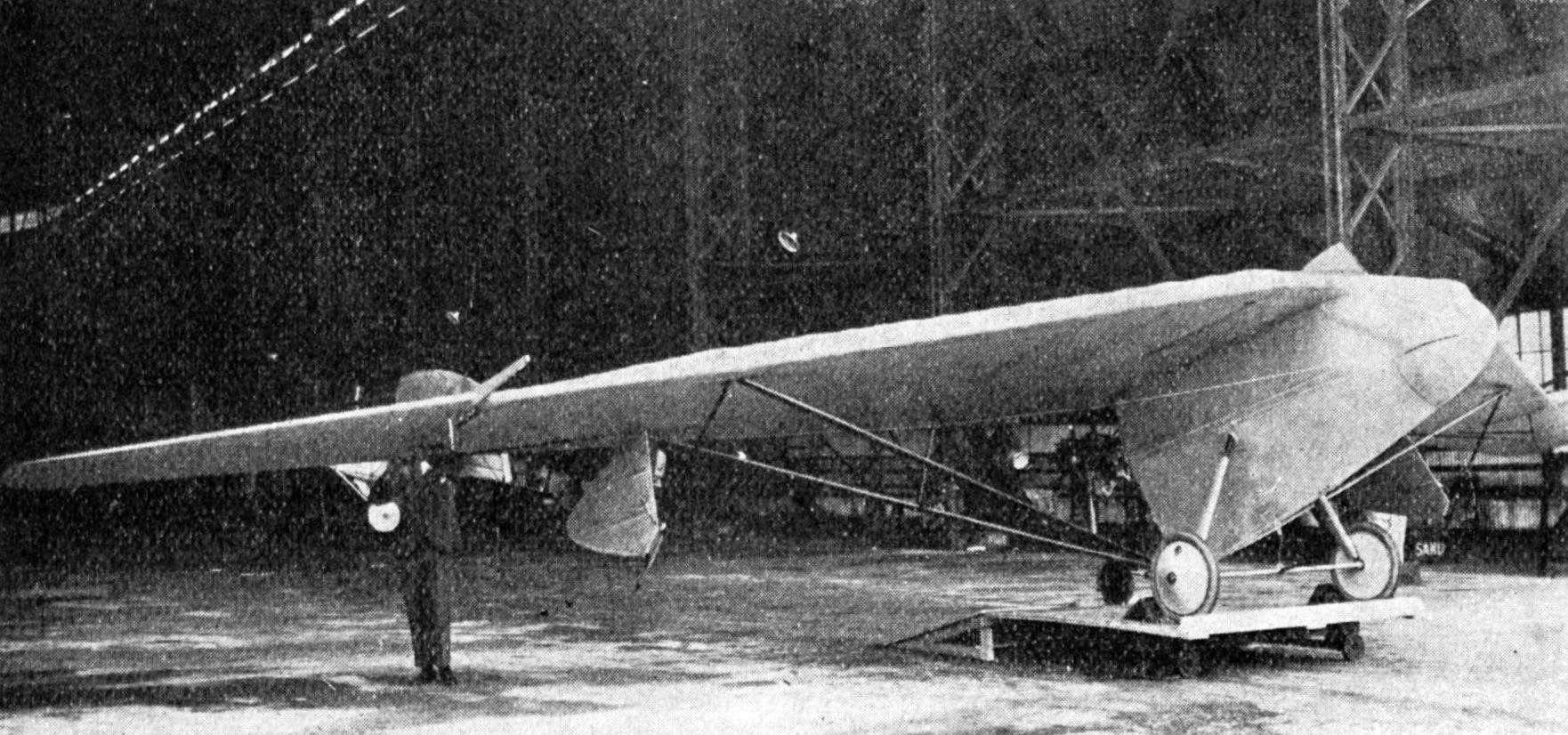
  Westland-Hill Pterodactyl I photo from L'Année aéronautique 1926

First Westland-built example, a braced monoplane. Initially fitted with a Bristol Cherub engine as the Mk. IA, later fitted with an Armstrong Siddeley Genet engine and smaller rudders as the Mk.IB. Air Ministry Specification 23/26 was issued to Westland for a "Tailless Aeroplane for Research Purposes" which allowed the ministry to subsidise the design and manufacture of the Pterodactyl IA. The aircraft was given serial J9251 and first flew in June 1928 from Andover.

- Pterodactyl II and III

Design projects for variants with gull wings.
Pterodactyl IV
Three-seat cabin monoplane of 44 ft 4 in (13.51 m) span and 19 ft 6 in (5.94 m) length, produced in 1931. Pitch and roll control by elevons. Also a braced monoplane, the wings had variable sweep through a small range of angles, to allow longitudinal trim in flight in the absence of any horizontal stabiliser. Air Ministry Specification 16/29 was issued to Westlands for an "Experimental Tailless Aircraft" with a contract to design and build one aircraft. The aircraft was given serial K1947 and first flew in March 1931 with a 120hp de Havilland Gipsy III engine in a pusher configuration.
Pterodactyl V
Fighter design in the form of a sesquiplane with straight lower wing. Fitted with a 600 hp Rolls-Royce Goshawk engine and two Vickers machine guns, it demonstrated equal capability to conventional fighters of the day, but other issues prevented it from going into production. Air Ministry Specification F.3/32 for a "Two-Seater Fighter Aircraft" was issued to Westlands and serial K2770 was issued, although it was first flown from Andover in May 1934 by Harold Penrose with the test serial P-8.
Pterodactyl VI
Proposal contemporary with the Mk V, having a reversed layout with a pusher engine and front-mounted gun turret. The variant of the Mark V was submitted for Specification F.5/33 for a two-seater fighter aircraft with front-mounted turret. The specification was withdrawn as the designs submitted did not give any advance of current fighters.
Pterodactyl VII
Proposal to meet Specification 1/33 for a "Tailless Boat Seaplane". It was a flying boat with two tractor and two pusher engines. The Pterodactyl was to be produced in cooperation with Saunders-Roe and models were successfully tested in a water tank by the NPL. A novel design feature was the use of a retractable outboard engine at the stern to act as a water rudder.
Pterodactyl VIII
Proposed Flying wing transatlantic passenger aircraft with five pusher Rolls-Royce Griffon engines, this design may have had a delta wing.
Pterodactyl fighter
A design for a Pterodactyl-type twin-engined fighter was submitted against Specification F.22/33 for a Twin-Engined Fighter Aircraft; the specification and proposals were not proceeded with.

=== Surviving aircraft ===
The Pterodactyl 1A of 1926 is held by the Science Museum London.

== See also ==
Aircraft of comparable role, configuration, and era

- Granger Archaeopteryx
- Lippisch Deltas
- Dunne tailless
