= Grumman XTSF =

Torpedo scout aircraft proposed for the US Navy in 1944

XTSF
- Mockup of the XTSF-1's forward fuselage

General information
- Type: Torpedo scout
- Manufacturer: Grumman
- Primary user: United States Navy
- Number built: None

History
- Developed from: Grumman F7F Tigercat

The Grumman XTSF was a proposed twin-engined torpedo scout aircraft, designed by Grumman for the United States Navy toward the end of World War II. Based on the design of the Grumman F7F Tigercat fighter, but enlarged and with the addition of a bomb bay, the XTSF was deemed too large for carrier operations, and the project was cancelled before any aircraft were built. Instead, the Navy chose to order the single-engined XTB3F, which became the successful AF Guardian.

== Design and development ==
In 1944, the Grumman XTB2F, then under development for the Navy, was determined to be too large to operate practically and safely from aircraft carriers. Even the new Midway-class aircraft carriers, known as "battle carriers" (CVB) and the largest aircraft carriers built by any nation to that point, would have difficulty operating the massive aircraft, which was the size of a U.S. Army Air Force medium bomber. As a result in late June 1944, Grumman submitted its G-66 design to the Bureau of Aeronautics. After a review of the design by the bureau during the following month, a revised design was submitted, and on August 17, the existing contract for the XTB2F was modified to instead order two XTSF-1 aircraft, to be based on Grumman's F7F-2 Tigercat two-seat, twin-engined fighter-bomber, the first prototype intended to be a conversion of a F7F airframe.

A midwing, all-metal, cantilever monoplane with two Pratt & Whitney Double Wasp radial engines mounted in streamlined nacelles under the wing, the XTSF-1 was intended to carry two crew members in tandem seats and featured an internal bomb bay and an SCR-720 radar set, the radar later being replaced in the design by an AN/APS-3 or AN/APS-4 set. A second seat was added for the radar operator.

The outer wing of the XTSF was lengthened by 7.8 feet (2.4 m) compared to that of the F7F-2, while the size of the horizontal stabilizer was increased by 28 inches (71 cm)). The vertical stabilizer was also enlarged, while the aircraft's weight increased by almost 2,000 lb (910 kg) over that of the Tigercat.

The wings folded upwards for stowage aboard aircraft carriers, while the undercarriage and arrestor hook were hydraulically operated. Gun armament was planned to be four .50 caliber (12.7 mm) Browning M2 machine guns, or alternatively, two 20 mm Hispano cannon, while a bomb bay based on that of the Grumman TBF Avenger was installed in a fuselage stretched by 5.5 inches (14 cm).

=== Cancellation ===
A mockup of the cockpit, center fuselage, and wing center section was built and was inspected by the Bureau of Aeronautics in the fall 1944. The contract for the prototype XTSF-1s, though, was terminated in January 1945, due to a variety of factors, including the Navy's belief that the Grumman engineers and factory were already at capacity producing the F6F Hellcat, the F7F, and the F8F Bearcat, that the XTSF-1 would be too large for practical operations from escort carriers, and the Grumman G-70, to be built as the XTB3F, was believed to be a better prospect. In addition, the F7F was proving difficult to certify for operations from aircraft carriers, further prejudicing the Navy against the design.

Some sources erroneously state that the XTSF-1 became the XTB2F, but this is not the case. The XTSF-1 was the only aircraft ever designated by the U.S. Navy in the TS for Torpedo Scout category, the designation being superseded and incorporated, along with BT for Bomber-Torpedo, SB for Scout-Bomber, and TB for Torpedo-Bomber, into the new A for Attack series.

== Specifications (XTSF-1) ==
Three-view drawing of the XTSF-1 from Johnson 2008.

Data from

General characteristics

- Crew: 2 (Pilot and radar operator)
- Length: 46 ft 4 in (14.12 m)
- Wingspan: 59 ft 4 in (18.08 m) (folded span 32 feet (9.8 m))
- Height: 16 ft (4.9 m)
- Wing area: 500 sq ft (46 m^{2})
- Airfoil: NACA 23015-23012
- Empty weight: 17,288 lb (7,842 kg)
- Gross weight: 26,171 lb (11,871 kg)
- Fuel capacity: 400 US gallons (1,500 L; 330 imp gal)
- Powerplant: 2 × Pratt & Whitney R-2800-22W Double Wasp radial engines, 2,400 hp (1,800 kW) each
- Propellers: 4-bladed Aeroproducts H-20-156, 13 ft 2 in (4.01 m) diameter

Performance

- Maximum speed: 414 mph (666 km/h, 360 kn) at 18,600 feet (5,700 m)
- Stall speed: 84 mph (135 km/h, 73 kn)
- Range: 975 mi (1,569 km, 847 nmi) internal fuel at 172 miles per hour (277 km/h)
- Combat range: 395 mi (636 km, 343 nmi) radius with two 150 US gallons (570 L; 120 imp gal) drop tanks
- Service ceiling: 36,500 ft (11,100 m)
- Rate of climb: 3,920 ft/min (19.9 m/s)
- Wing loading: 47.9 lb/sq ft (234 kg/m^{2})
- Power/mass: 6.5lb/bhp

Armament

- Guns: 4 .50-calibre machine guns
- Hardpoints: Two, 1,000 pounds (450 kg) capacity each
- Bombs: Internal bomb bay, capacity one Mark 13 torpedo, one 2,000 pounds (910 kg) bomb or naval mine, or up to 4,000 pounds (1,800 kg) smaller bombs, or up to 1,300 pounds (590 kg) depth charges.

== See also ==
Related development

- Grumman F7F Tigercat

Aircraft of comparable role, configuration, and era

- Bristol Brigand
- Douglas BTD Destroyer
- Grumman XTB2F

Related lists

- List of United States Navy aircraft designations (pre-1962)
