= NRC tailless glider =

Canadian tailless glider, 1946

General information
- Type: Research Glider
- National origin: Canada
- Manufacturer: National Research Council of Canada
- Designer: Geoffrey T. R. Hill
- Number built: 1

History
- First flight: 1946

The NRC tailless glider, also called the NRL tailless glider, was a two-seat tailless research glider designed by the National Research Council of Canada and built by the National Research Laboratories, at the instigation of G.T.R. Hill who had previously designed the British Westland-Hill Pterodactyl series of tailless aircraft.

== Development ==
To research the control and stability of tailless aircraft, the National Research Council of Canada initiated a research programme using a specially designed glider, the NRC tailless glider. During the inter-war years Geoffrey T. R. Hill had designed and Westland Aircraft Limited had built a series of tailless aircraft with support from the Royal Aircraft Establishment. During World War II Geoffrey Hill served as the British Scientific Liaison Officer at the National Research Council (NRC) in Canada, where he proposed the development of a tailless research glider similar to his Pterodactyl designs.

== Design ==
The glider was constructed predominantly from wood with a single spar built from laminated wood supporting wooden built up ribs covered with a relatively thick plywood skin, which resulted in a smooth surface with minimal distortion. The wing had three distinct sections, comprising a constant-chord, unswept centre section flanked by swept tapered outer sections. Primary flight controls consisted of elevons on the trailing edges of the outer wing sections for pitch and roll, with fins and rudders on the wing-tips for yaw stability and control. Trim in pitch was achieved by adjusting the incidence of movable wing tips using screw jacks. For approach and landing split flaps were fitted to the wing centre section trailing edge.

The undercarriage consisted of a retractable tricycle arrangement with auxiliary skids which could be lowered in case the undercarriage failed to extend. Differential brakes were fitted to the main undercarriage wheels.

The pilot and flight test engineer were accommodated in two separate cockpits protruding from the top surface of the wing centre section with the pilot in the port cockpit and test engineer in the starboard cockpit. A comprehensive instrumentation package was fitted, with automatic recording of time, airspeed, altitude, wing tip incidence, flap angle, side-slip, roll rate, pitch rate, yaw rate, elevon hinge moment, elevon angles, rudder angles, ambient air temperature, normal acceleration (gy), longitudinal acceleration (gz), gyro attitude, pendulum attitude and bank angle. In addition radio transmissions from the pilot and test engineer were recorded on the ground.

== Operational history ==
Flight testing of the aircraft began in 1946 at Namao, Edmonton, flown by S/L. Robert Kronfeld, A.F.C. RAF initially and continued by S/L. E. L. Baudoux, D.S.O., D.F.C., F/L. G. S. Phripp and F/L. G. A. Lee. Mr. T.E.Stephenson was in overall charge of the flying operations as well as scientific observations in the starboard cockpit. Ground handling of the glider was found to be good, using the differential brakes. Launches were carried out as aero-tows behind an RCAF Douglas Dakota with a 350 ft nylon tow-rope, at a normal towing speed of 100 mph, but tows at 140 mph were found to pose no difficulties. Flight testing was carried out predominantly in the glide after a tow to between 6,000 ft and 10,000 ft, testing being terminated at 4,000 ft to allow positioning for entering the landing circuit. Flight characteristics were found to be good with the exception of poor yaw control at low speeds.

In September 1948, the glider was towed 2,300 mi (3,701 km) across Canada to Arnprior, Ontario for further testing, completing 105 hours before the project was terminated.

== Specifications ==
Data from RCAF

General characteristics

- Crew: 2
- Length: 18 ft 0 in (5.48 m)
- Wingspan: 46 ft 8 in (14.22 m)
- Gross weight: 4,150 lb (1,882 kg)

Performance

- Maximum speed: 140 mph (225 km/h, 120 kn)
- Service ceiling: 10,000 ft (3,048 m)

== See also ==
Related development

- Westland-Hill Pterodactyl

Aircraft of comparable role, configuration, and era

- Armstrong-Whitworth AW.52G
- General Aircraft GAL.56
- General Aircraft GAL.61
- Lippisch Delta series
