= Robertsbridge Community College =

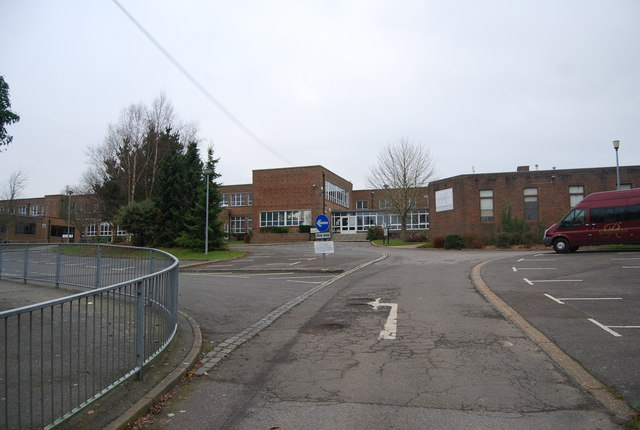
- Robertsbridge Community College

Location
- Knelle Road; Robertsbridge, East Sussex, TN32 5EA; England; 50°59′10″N 0°27′43″E

Information
- Type: Community school
- Established: 1955
- Local authority: East Sussex
- Department for Education URN: 114588 Tables
- Ofsted: Reports
- Head teacher: Zak Vice
- Gender: Coeducational
- Age range: 11–16
- Enrolment: 754 as of April 2024
- Website: www.robertsbridge.org.uk

Robertsbridge Community College is a coeducational secondary school located in Robertsbridge in the English county of East Sussex.

It was established in 1955 as Robertsbridge County Secondary School, and was renamed Robertsbridge Community College in 1993. Today, it is a community school administered by East Sussex County Council. In 2020 the school opened a SEND unit for pupils with Autism and other learning disabilities. The school was graded 'Inadequate' in its most recent (2024) Ofsted report.

Robertsbridge Community College offers GCSEs, BTECs and NCFE awards as programmes of study for pupils. Pupils can also participate in The Duke of Edinburgh's Award programme.

== Notable former pupils ==
- Sarah Keith-Lucas, meteorologist and weather presenter
- George Marsh, footballer
