= Grumman F7F Tigercat =

1943 twin-engine fighter aircraft family

F7F Tigercat
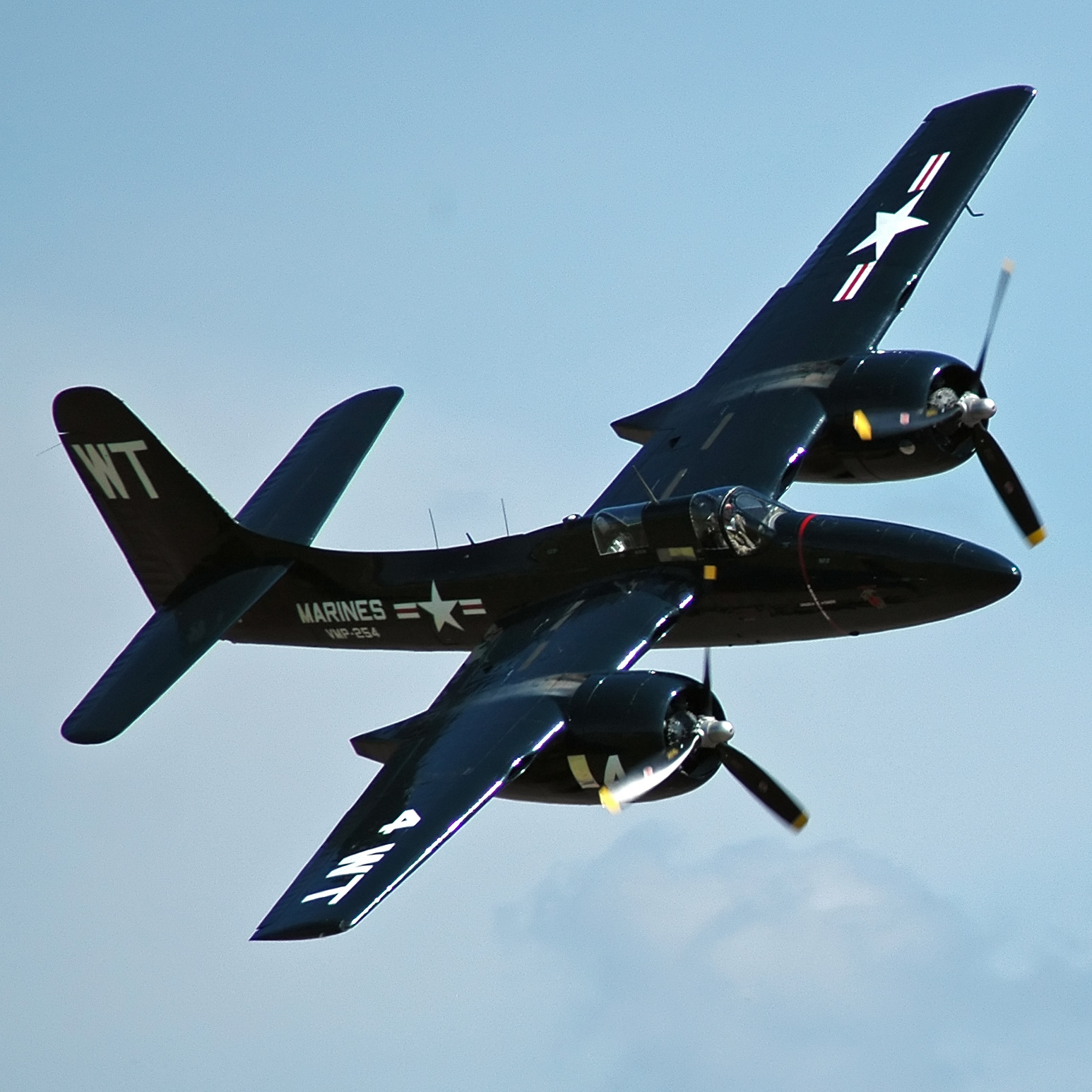
- An F7F-3P preserved in United States Marine Corps markings in flight

General information
- Type: Heavy fighter
- National origin: United States
- Manufacturer: Grumman
- Primary users: United States Navy United States Marine Corps
- Number built: 364

History
- Manufactured: 1943–1946
- Introduction date: 1944
- First flight: 2 November 1943
- Retired: 1954
- Developed into: Grumman XTSF

The Grumman F7F Tigercat is a heavy fighter aircraft that served with the United States Navy (USN) and United States Marine Corps (USMC) from late in World War II until 1954. It was the first twin-engined fighter to be deployed by the USN. While the Tigercat was delivered too late to see combat in World War II, it did serve in reconnaissance roles. The Tigercat primarily saw action as a night fighter and attack aircraft during the Korean War.

Designed initially for service on Midway-class aircraft carriers, early production F7Fs were land-based variants. The type was too large to operate from older and smaller carriers, and only a late variant (F7F-4N) was certified for carrier service.

== Design and development ==
Based on the earlier Grumman XP-50 that was eventually canceled, the company developed the XP-65 (Model 51) further for a future "convoy fighter" concept. In 1943, work on the XP-65 was terminated in favor of the design that would eventually become the F7F. The contract for the prototype XF7F-1 was signed on 30 June 1941. Grumman's aim was to produce a fighter that outperformed and outgunned all existing fighter aircraft and that had an auxiliary ground-attack capability.

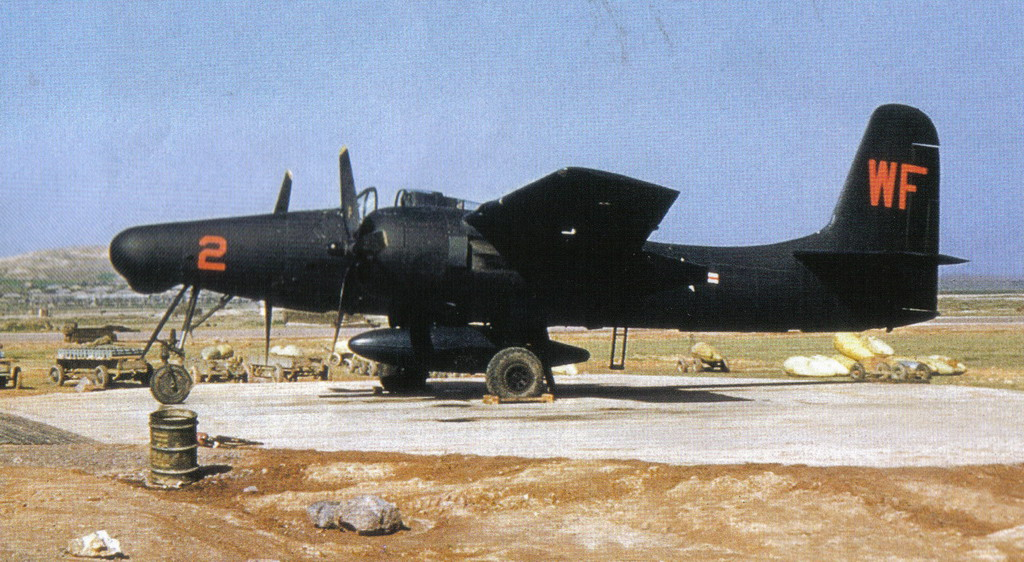
An F7F-3N of VMF(N)-513 at Wonsan, Korea, in 1952

Performance of the prototype and initial production aircraft met expectations; the F7F was one of the fastest piston-engined fighters, with a top speed significantly greater than single-engined USN aircraft — 71 mph faster than a Grumman F6F Hellcat at sea level. Captain Fred Trapnell, one of the premier USN test pilots of the era, stated: "It's the best damn fighter I've ever flown." The F7F was to be heavily armed — four 20 mm cannon and four .50 caliber (0.50 in; 12.7 mm) machine guns, as well as underwing and underfuselage hardpoints for bombs and torpedoes. This speed and firepower were bought at the cost of heavy weight and a high landing speed, but what caused the aircraft to fail carrier suitability trials was poor directional stability with only one engine operational, as well as problems with the tailhook design. The initial production series was, therefore, used only from land bases by the USMC, as night fighters with APS-6 radar.

While the F7F was initially also known as the Grumman Tomcat, this name was abandoned, because it was considered at the time to have excessively sexual overtones; (from the 1970s, the name Tomcat became commonly associated with, and officially used by the Navy for, another Grumman design, the F-14 twin-jet carrier-based interceptor). The first production variant was the single-seat F7F-1N aircraft; after the 34th production aircraft, a second seat for a radar operator was added and these aircraft were designated F7F-2N.

A second production version, the F7F-3, was modified to correct the issues that caused the aircraft to fail carrier acceptance, and this version was again trialled on the USS Shangri-La. A wing failure on a heavy landing caused the failure of this carrier qualification, as well. F7F-3 aircraft were produced in day-fighter, night-fighter, and photo-reconnaissance versions.

The final production version, the F7F-4N, was extensively rebuilt for additional strength and stability, and did pass carrier qualification, but only 12 were built.

== Operational history ==
The F7F Tigercat was produced too late to serve in its intended role in WWII; however, early F7F-1 models saw service in the Pacific Theatre before the end of the war. One USMC photographic reconnaissance squadron equipped with the F7F, VMP-354, arrived in Guam in June 1945, and was quickly transferred to Yontan Airfield in Okinawa in July 1945. In July and August 1945, VMP-354 used the F7F to photograph potential invasion beaches for Operation Downfall in Southern Kyushu.

USMC night-fighter squadron VMF(N)-513 flying F7F-3N Tigercats saw action in the early stages of the Korean War, flying night interdiction and fighter missions and shooting down two Polikarpov Po-2 biplanes. This was the only combat use of the aircraft.

Most F7F-2Ns were modified to control drones for combat training, and these gained bubble canopies over the rear cockpit for the drone controller. An F7F-2D used for pilot transitioning also had a rear-sliding, bubble canopy.

In 1945, two Tigercats, serial numbers TT346 and TT349, were evaluated, but rejected by the British Royal Navy in favor of a naval version of the de Havilland Hornet.

== Variants ==
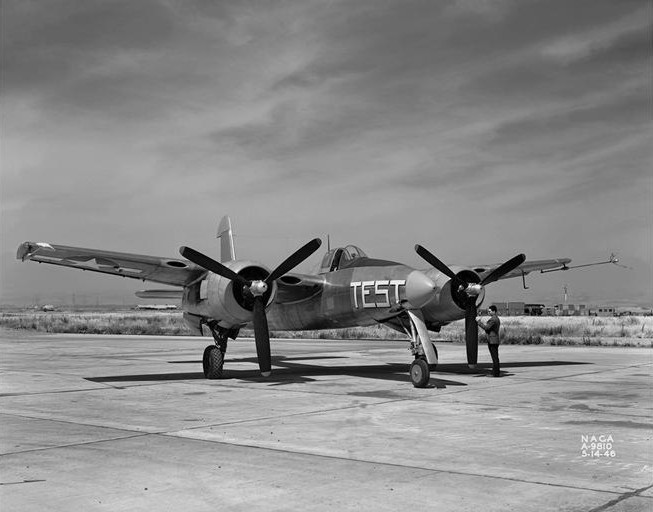
The second XF7F-1 in 1946

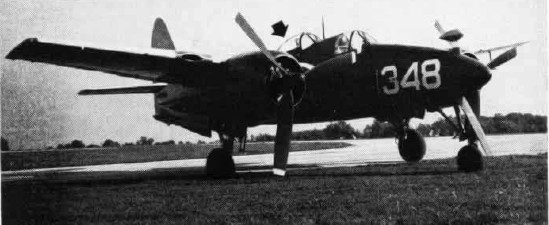
An F7F-2D drone controller with an additional F8F windshield

An F7F-3N night fighter of VMF(N)-513 in April 1950

XP-65
Proposed United States Army Air Forces pursuit fighter
XF7F-1
Prototype aircraft, two built
F7F-1 Tigercat
Twin-engined fighter-bomber aircraft, powered by two Pratt & Whitney R-2800-22W radial piston engines, first production version, 34 built
F7F-1N Tigercat
Single-seat night fighter aircraft, fitted with an APS-6 radar
XF7F-2N
Night-fighter prototype, one built
F7F-2N Tigercat
Two-seat night fighter, 65 built
F7F-2D
Small numbers of F7F-2Ns were converted into drone control aircraft; they were fitted with a Grumman F8F Bearcat windshield behind the cockpit.
F7F-3 Tigercat
Single-seat fighter-bomber aircraft, powered by two Pratt & Whitney R-2800-34W radial piston engines and featuring an enlarged tailfin for improved stability at high altitudes, 189 built
F7F-3N Tigercat
Two-seat night fighter aircraft, 60 built
F7F-3E Tigercat
Small numbers of F7F-3s were converted into electronic-warfare aircraft.
F7F-3P Tigercat
Small numbers of F7F-3s were converted into photo-reconnaissance aircraft.
F7F-4N Tigercat
Two-seat night-fighter aircraft, fitted with a tailhook and other naval equipment, 12 built

== Operators ==
United States

- United States Marine Corps
- United States Navy

== Surviving aircraft ==
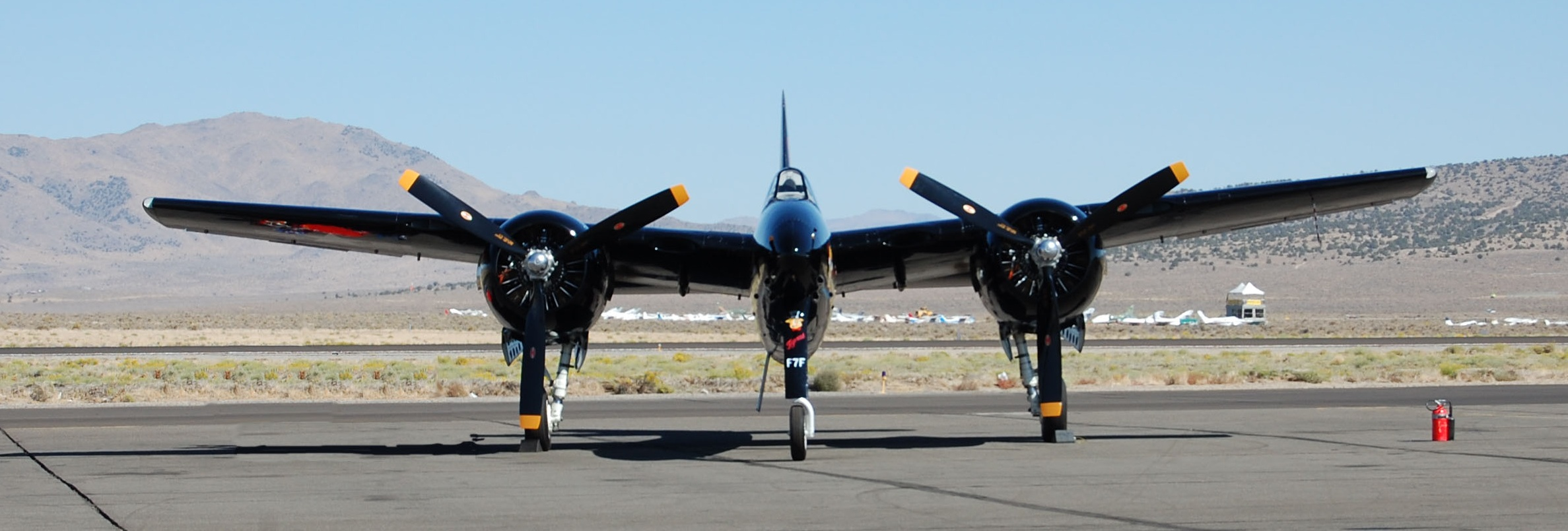
The Tigercat was designed to have a very small frontal area.

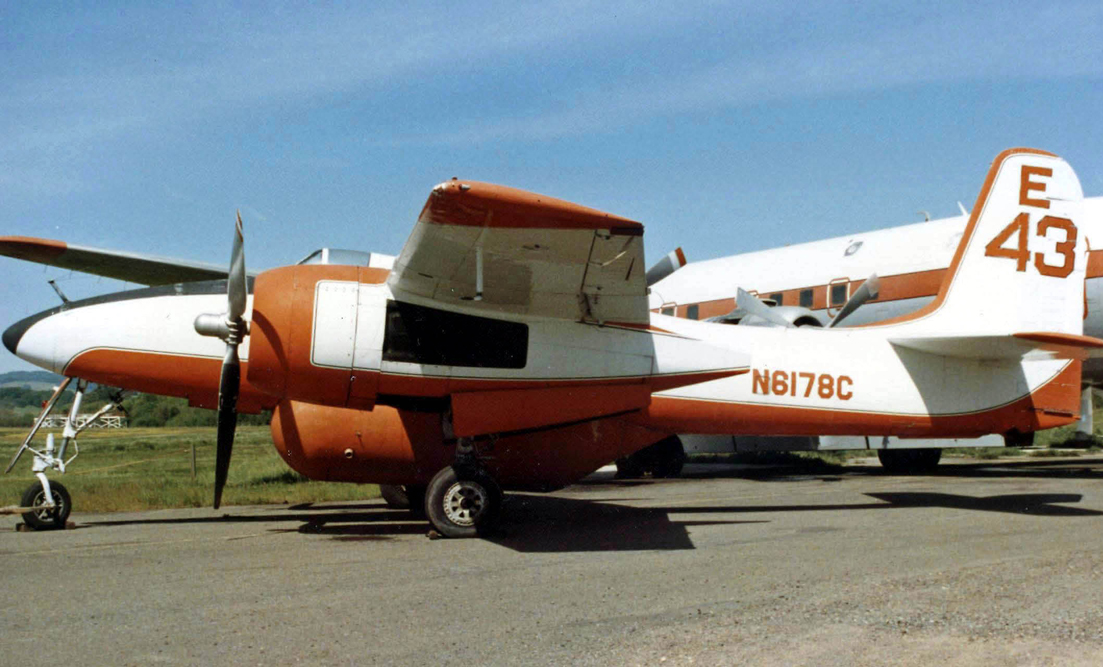
F7F-3N Tigercat in use with belly tank in the fire-fighting role in 1988

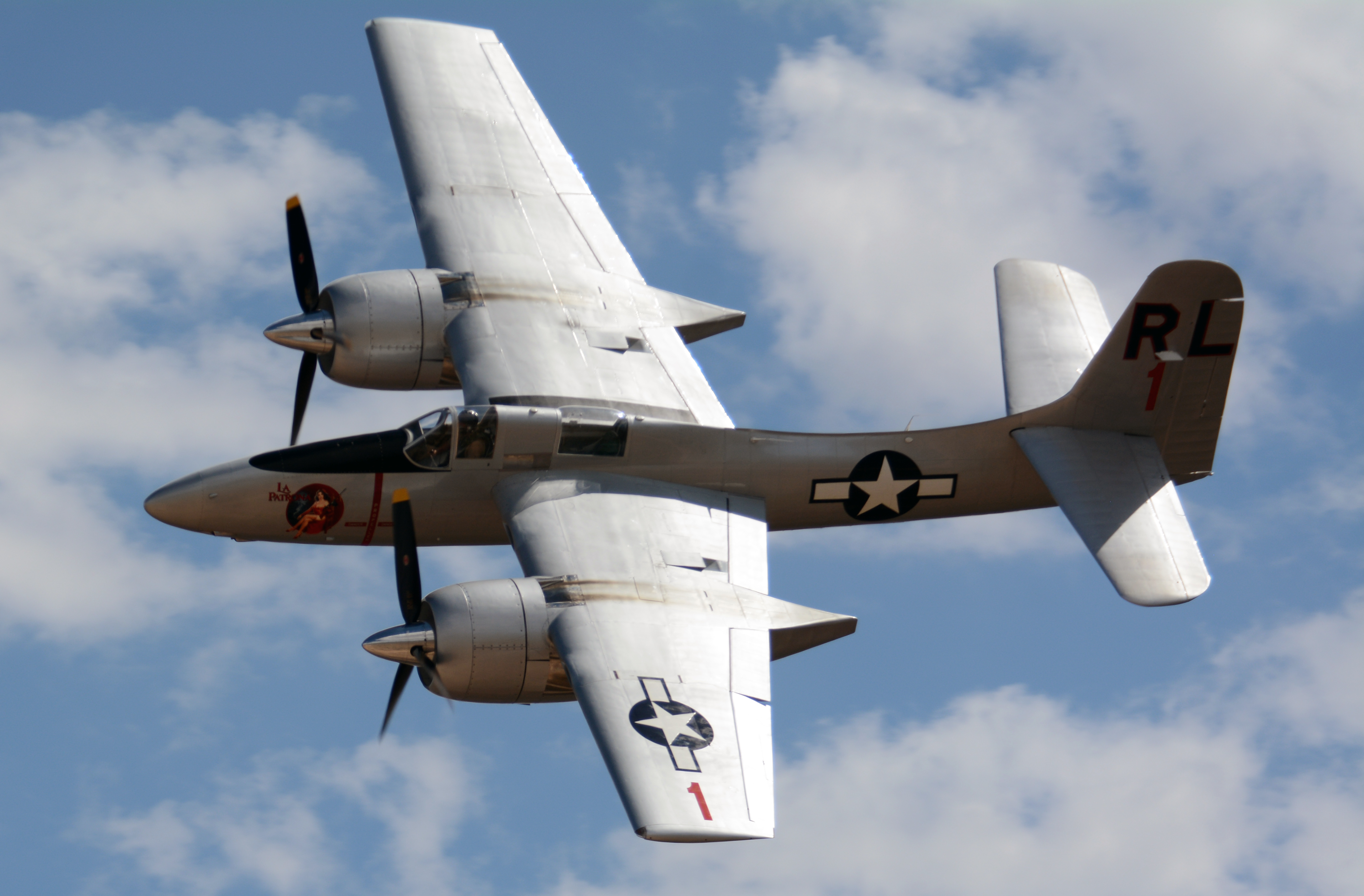
F7F Tigercat N747MX La Patrona at 2014 Reno Air Races

Beginning in 1949, F7Fs were flown to the then-USN storage facility at Naval Air Station Litchfield Park, Arizona. Although the vast majority of the airframes were eventually scrapped, a number of examples were purchased as surplus. The surviving Tigercats were primarily used as water bombers to fight wildfires in the 1960s and 1970s, and Sis-Q Flying Services of Santa Rosa, California, operated an F7F-3N tanker in this role until retirement in the late 1980s.

Airworthy

F7F-3

- 80374 is based at the National Museum of World War II Aviation in Colorado Springs, Colorado.
- 80375 is based at the National Museum of World War II Aviation in Colorado Springs.
- 80411 is based at Palm Springs Air Museum in Palm Springs, California.
- 80425 is privately owned in Seattle, Washington.
- 80483 is privately owned in Houston, Texas.
- 80503 is based at Lewis Air Legends in San Antonio, Texas.
- 80532 is privately owned in Bentonville, Arkansas.

F7F-3P

- 80390 is based at Lewis Air Legends in San Antonio, Texas.

On display

F7F-3

- 80373: National Naval Aviation Museum in Naval Air Station Pensacola, Florida
- 80410: Pima Air & Space Museum, adjacent to Davis–Monthan Air Force Base, in Tucson, Arizona.

F7F-3N

- 80382: Planes of Fame Air Museum in Chino, California

Under restoration or in storage

F7F-3

- 80404 is in storage at the Fantasy of Flight in Polk City, Florida.

== Specifications (F7F-4N Tigercat) ==
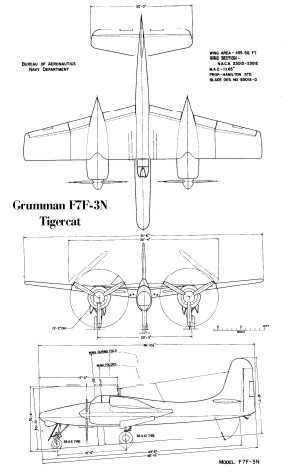
3-view drawing of a Grumman F7F-3N Tigercat

Data from Jane's Fighting Aircraft of World War II

General characteristics

- Crew: 2
- Length: 45 ft 4 in (13.82 m)
- Wingspan: 51 ft 6 in (15.70 m)
- Height: 16 ft 7 in (5.05 m)
- Wing area: 455 sq ft (42.3 m^{2})
- Airfoil: root: NACA 23015; tip: NACA 23012
- Empty weight: 16,270 lb (7,380 kg)
- Max takeoff weight: 25,720 lb (11,666 kg)
- Powerplant: 2 × Pratt & Whitney R-2800-34W Double Wasp 18-cylinder air-cooled radial piston engines, 2,100 hp (1,600 kW) each
- Propellers: 3-bladed constant-speed fully-feathering propellers

Performance

- Maximum speed: 460 mph (740 km/h, 400 kn)
- Range: 1,200 mi (1,900 km, 1,000 nmi)
- Service ceiling: 40,400 ft (12,300 m)
- Rate of climb: 4,530 ft/min (23.0 m/s)

Armament

- Guns: ** 4 × 20 mm (0.79 in) AN/M3 cannon (200 rpg, wing roots)
  - 4 × 0.50 in (12.7 mm) M2 Browning machine gun (400 rpg, in nose) (normal fighter versions only; replaced by radar unit in the -3N nightfighter)
- Bombs: ** 2 × 1,000 lb (454 kg) bombs or
  - 8 × 127mm unguided rockets under wings and
  - 1 × 150 gallon fuel or napalm tank under fuselage or
  - 1 × torpedo under fuselage (day fighter only)

Avionics

- AN/APS-19 radar

== See also ==
Related development

- Grumman XTSF

Aircraft of comparable role, configuration, and era

- de Havilland Hornet
- FMA I.Ae. 30 Ñancú
- Focke-Wulf Ta 154
- Kawasaki Ki-102
- Mitsubishi Ki-83
- Northrop P-61 Black Widow
- Rikugun Ki-93

Related lists

- List of aircraft of World War II
- List of military aircraft of the United States
- List of United States Navy aircraft designations (pre-1962)
