= Alan Keith-Lucas =

British-born social worker and professor

Alan Keith-Lucas (5 February 1910 – 5 August 1995), known during the early part of his life as Alan Lucas, was a British-born social worker and professor at the University of North Carolina at Chapel Hill who worked primarily in the field of residential childcare.

== Early life ==
Alan Lucas was one of three sons of Alys Hubbard Lucas and Keith Lucas, inventor of the first aeronautical compass. His brothers were the aeronautical engineer David Keith-Lucas and the political scientist Bryan Keith-Lucas. After the death of Keith Lucas in 1916, his wife Alys changed the family name, and, as Alys Keith-Lucas, edited a short book giving his background together with reminiscences of him and a list of his publications.

He was educated at Yardley Court and Gresham's School, Holt, and then (like his father) at Trinity College, Cambridge, graduating in 1931 with a first-class Bachelor of Arts in English, a first degree which later gave him the title of Master of Arts (Cantab.). Interested in the emerging profession of social work, not then studied at post-graduate level in Britain, Keith-Lucas moved to the United States. At Case Western Reserve University he earned a master's degree in social administration, and he went on to take a Doctorate in Philosophy from Duke University.

== Career ==
In 1950, Keith-Lucas joined the faculty of the University of North Carolina at Chapel Hill. He also founded the Group Child Care Consultants Services, a vehicle to help private and public group homes better serve their juvenile population. He was later named Alumni Distinguished Professor Social Work.

As a consultant, Keith Lucas was well regarded. He often held controversial and challenging views in regards to childhood development and the structure of group homes. He believed in the primacy of getting the larger family unit involved, using state welfare agencies as a temporary reprieve for children while an intervention was made to get the family back on track.

== Beliefs ==
Keith-Lucas' ideas about how to intervene with problematic family situations were sometimes controversial. Unlike many others in his field, he readily endorsed the use of group homes as the first, not the last, intervention. His positions were sometimes unpopular with administrators, and especially policymakers.

== Retirement ==
Though he retired from active teaching in 1975, Keith-Lucas was still heavily involved in social work. He served on the board of the North American Association of Christian Social Workers, lectured, and consulted with residential child care agencies. He continued to write and publish journal articles and books until his death in 1995. His collection of personal writings and correspondence are archived at Roberts Wesleyan College.

== Publications ==
=== Books ===
- Some casework concepts for the public welfare worker. (1957)
- Decision about people in need;a study of administrative responsiveness in public assistance (1957)
- The church and social welfare (1962)
- Giving and taking help (1972, republished 1994)
- Group child care as a family service(1977)
- So you want to be a social worker: A primer for the Christian student
- The poor you have with you always (1989)
- A Legacy of Caring: The Charleston Orphan House 1790–1990
- Hope and healing: the first hundred years of Connie Maxwell history (1991)
- Encounters with children: Stories that help us understand and help them (1991)
- Integrating faith and practice: A history of North American Association of Christians in Social Work (1994)

=== Journal articles ===
- (1953). Status of parents of children in foster care. Child Welfare Journal, 32(6), 3–5.
- With Elliott, S. (1954). A mother's movement toward responsibility during her child's placement. Social Casework, 35, 166–169.
- (1954). The Specialized Court—its philosophy and function. US Department of Labor, Children's Bureau, 346, 99–99.
- (1992). Encounters with children: Children and religion. Residential Treatment for Children & Youth, 10(1), 65–73.
- (1996). Celebrating and affirming children. Residential Treatment for Children & Youth, 14(1), 1–8.
- (1987, June). What else can residential care do? And do well?. Residential Treatment for Children & Youth, 4(4), 25–37.

== Sources ==
- Sherwood, D.A. (1995). In memory: Alan-Keith Lucas. Social work and Christianity 22(2), 158–159.
- Powell, J.Y. (1996). Alan Keith Lucas, PhD, 1910–1995: Teacher extradoinaire. Residential treatment for children & youth, 14(2).
