= Sarah Keith-Lucas =

English meteorologist and weather presenter

Sarah Dorothy Keith-Lucas (born 12 February 1982) is an English meteorologist and BBC weather presenter.

== Early life ==
Keith-Lucas was born in Hastings, East Sussex in 1982. She is the daughter of Christopher Leslie Keith-Lucas (born 1949) and Claire Forrester. Her middle name comes from her grandmother Dorothy de Bauduy Robertson, who was killed in a road accident in 1979; Dorothy's husband was David Keith-Lucas, who was an aerodynamicist in Kent during World War II and president, from 1968 to 1969, of the Royal Aeronautical Society. Keith-Lucas has an older brother. Her mother stood for the SDP Alliance in May 1987 for the Northiam seat but lost to the Conservative Party.

For part of her education Keith-Lucas attended Cranbrook School, Kent, a co-educational state grammar school. She took her GCSEs at Robertsbridge Community College.

She studied geography at Durham University (Collingwood College).

== Career ==
Keith-Lucas joined the Met Office in 2007 and started presenting the weather for BBC Weather in 2008. She has done the five-day weather on the BBC One series Countryfile. She also presents occasional weather-based documentaries on the BBC News and BBC World News channels Climate Check, and Weather World, which she co-presents with Nick Miller.

Keith-Lucas won an episode of Celebrity Mastermind that aired on 4 March 2023; her specialist subject was the 1986 film Labyrinth.

Keith-Lucas presented Heatwaves: The New Normal? a programme about the increasing frequency of heatwaves in the UK. It was first shown on the BBC News channel in June 2025 and on BBC2 in July 2025.
