= David Keith-Lucas =

British aeronautical engineer (1911–1997)

David Keith-Lucas CBE, FRAeS
- Born: 25 March 1911
- Died: 6 April 1997 (aged 86)
- Education: Gresham's School, Holt
- Spouse: Dorothy de Bauduy Robertson
- Parent: Keith Lucas
- Engineering career
- Discipline: Aeronautical engineering
- Institutions: C.A. Parsons and Co.
- Practice name: Short Brothers
- Employer: Harland Ltd
- Projects: Short SB-5 research aircraft
- Significant design: Short SB.1
- Significant advance: Aero-isoclinic wing
- Awards: President of the Royal Aeronautical Society, Honorary Doctorate Queen's University, Belfast, Commander of the Order of the British Empire

David Keith-Lucas CBE FRAeS (25 March 1911 – 6 April 1997) was a British aeronautical engineer.

== Early life ==
David Keith-Lucas was one of the sons of Alys Hubbard Lucas and Keith Lucas, who invented the first aeronautical compass. After the death of Keith Lucas in 1916, his wife Alys changed the family name, and, as Alys Keith-Lucas, edited a short book giving his background together with reminiscences of him and a list of his publications. David Keith-Lucas was educated at Yardley Court, Gresham's School, Holt, and at Gonville and Caius College, Cambridge, where he read engineering.

== Career ==
David Keith-Lucas was an apprentice and engineer with C.A. Parsons and Co. from 1933 to 1940, then moved to the aerodynamics office of Short Brothers, Rochester, famous for their flying boats, becoming their chief aerodynamicist in 1944.

From 1945 to 1965 he was with Short Brothers and Harland Ltd in Belfast, holding the posts of chief designer, technical director and research director. His work included research on swept-wings which culminated in the Short SB-5 research aircraft. Other projects included the Short Belfast heavy freighter, the Short Skyvan, and the SD-330 and SD-360 freight-commuter series.

The Short SB.1 was a shoulder-wing, cantilever, tailless monoplane glider designed by David Keith-Lucas and Professor Geoffrey T.R. Hill and built by Shorts as a private research venture to test the concept of the aero-isoclinic wing; it was the first aircraft to incorporate this feature. After initial tests, at the end of which the SB.1 crash-landed as a result of problems while being towed behind the Short Sturgeon, the SB.1 was further developed into the Short SB.4 Sherpa, powered by two Blackburn Turbomeca Palas turbojet engines.

In 1951, Keith-Lucas designed the Short SB-6 Seamew as a lightweight anti-submarine platform.

While in Belfast, he served on the Senate of the Queen's University, Belfast.

In 1965 he was appointed Professor of Aircraft Design at the College of Aeronautics, Cranfield, later the Cranfield Institute of Technology, and welded together the departments of Aerodynamics, Aircraft Design and Flight into a new College of Aeronautics. In 1972, he became its Professor of Aeronautics and also Chairman of the College, which now forms part of Cranfield University.

On retirement in 1976, he was appointed Professor Emeritus and awarded an Honorary Doctorate.

=== Career in brief ===
- Chief Aerodynamicist, Short Bros 1940–49
- Chief Designer, Short Bros & Harland Ltd. 1949–58
- Technical Director, Short Bros & Harland Ltd. 1958–64
- Director of Research Short Bros & Harland Ltd. 1964–65
- Member of the Senate of the Queen's University, Belfast, 1960–65
- Professor of Aircraft Design, Cranfield Institute of Technology 1965–72
- Professor of Aeronautics, College of Aeronautics, 1972–76
- Chairman, College of Aeronautics 1972–76

== Publications ==
- The Shape of Wings to Come (1952)

== Honours ==
- President of the Royal Aeronautical Society, 1968
- Doctor of Science Queen's University, Belfast, 1968
- Commander of the Order of the British Empire, 1973
- Honorary Doctorate, Cranfield University, 1976
- Emeritus Professor, College of Aeronautics, 1976
- Gold Medal of the Royal Aeronautical Society, 1975

== Other appointments ==
- Member of the Council of the Air Registration Board, 1967–1972
- Chairman of the Airworthiness Requirements Board, 1972–1982
- Member of the Roskill Commission for the Third London Airport, 1968–1970.

== Family ==
In 1942, Keith-Lucas married firstly Dorothy de Bauduy Robertson, and they had two sons and one daughter. In 1979, he and his wife visited Kitty Hawk, North Carolina, where the Wright brothers had made their flights. His wife was killed there in a road accident, and Keith-Lucas himself was seriously injured. In 1981, he married secondly Phyllis Everard Whurr.

Keith-Lucas's brother, Professor Bryan Keith-Lucas, a political scientist and Master of Darwin College, Kent, died in 1996. He was also the brother of Social Work Professor Alan Keith-Lucas.

Keith-Lucas is the grandfather of BBC weather presenter Sarah Keith-Lucas, who did a "Weatherworld" programme on her grandfather's work on the Short SB.4, the prototype of which is now with the Ulster Aviation Society.

== Sources ==
- "Obituary of Professor David Keith-Lucas". The Independent. 29 May 1997. Archived from the original on 11 March 2007 – via FindArticles.
- The Short SB4 at Probertencyclopaedia.com

Professional and academic associations
Preceded by Sir Morien Morgan	President of the Royal Aeronautical Society; 1968–69	Succeeded by Air Cdre Francis Rodwell Banks
