= Bryan Keith-Lucas =

English political scientist

Bryan Keith-Lucas CBE (born Lucas; 1 August 1912, Fen Ditton, Cambridgeshire − 1996, Canterbury, Kent) was an English political scientist.

== Education ==
The son of Alys Hubbard Lucas and Keith Lucas, professor of physiology at Cambridge and an instrument designer, Keith-Lucas was born at Fen Ditton and educated at Yardley Court and Gresham's School, Holt, and Pembroke College, Cambridge, where he read history and economics. In his Tripos he gained an upper Second in history and a lower Second in economics. While at Cambridge, he took a great interest in government, especially social policy and the problems of housing, thanks to two priests, Father Jellicoe and Father Scott, who had begun the St Pancras Housing Society. He decided to become a solicitor. The family name was changed to Keith-Lucas to honour the father after his death in 1916.

== Career ==
Bryan Keith-Lucas joined the town clerk's department at Kensington, London, and qualified as a solicitor in 1937. During the Second World War he served with the Buffs and Sherwood Foresters in north Africa, Italy, and Cyprus, and was Mentioned in Despatches, ending the war as a major.

He then returned to local government in Nottingham. In 1948 he became senior lecturer in local government at the University of Oxford, and in 1950 a fellow of Nuffield College, Oxford. He served as an Oxford city councillor for the Liberal Party, sat on several government committees, and advised on aspects of local government for Britain's former colonies.

In 1965 he was appointed professor of government at the new University of Kent at Canterbury, and from 1970 to 1974 he was Master of Darwin College, Kent. He retired in 1977 and taught politics part-time at King's School, Canterbury. In the last years of his life, he lived at Wye, Kent.

== Family ==
Keith-Lucas married Mary Hardwicke in 1946. They had a son, and two daughters. He was the brother of David Keith-Lucas (1911–1997), an aeronautical engineer, and of Alan Keith-Lucas.

== Honours ==
- 1983: Commander of the Order of the British Empire

== Publications ==
- The English Local Government Franchise (1952)
- The Mayor, Aldermen and Councillors (1961)
- History of Local Government in England by Josef Redlich and Francis Wrigley Hirst (editor of 2nd edition, 1970)
- English Local Government in the 19th and 20th Centuries (1977)
- A History of Local Government in the 20th Century (with P. G. Richards, 1978)
- The Unreformed Local Government System (1980)
- Parish Affairs (1986)
- A Kentish Parson (Joseph Price, approximately 1736-1807; ed. with Dr G. M. Ditchfield, 1991)

== Sources ==
- Keith Lucas by John K. Bradley in Oxford Dictionary of National Biography (OUP, 2004)
- Who's Who 1993 (A. & C. Black, London, 1993)
