= Short Seamew =

British aircraft designed in 1951

SB.6 Seamew
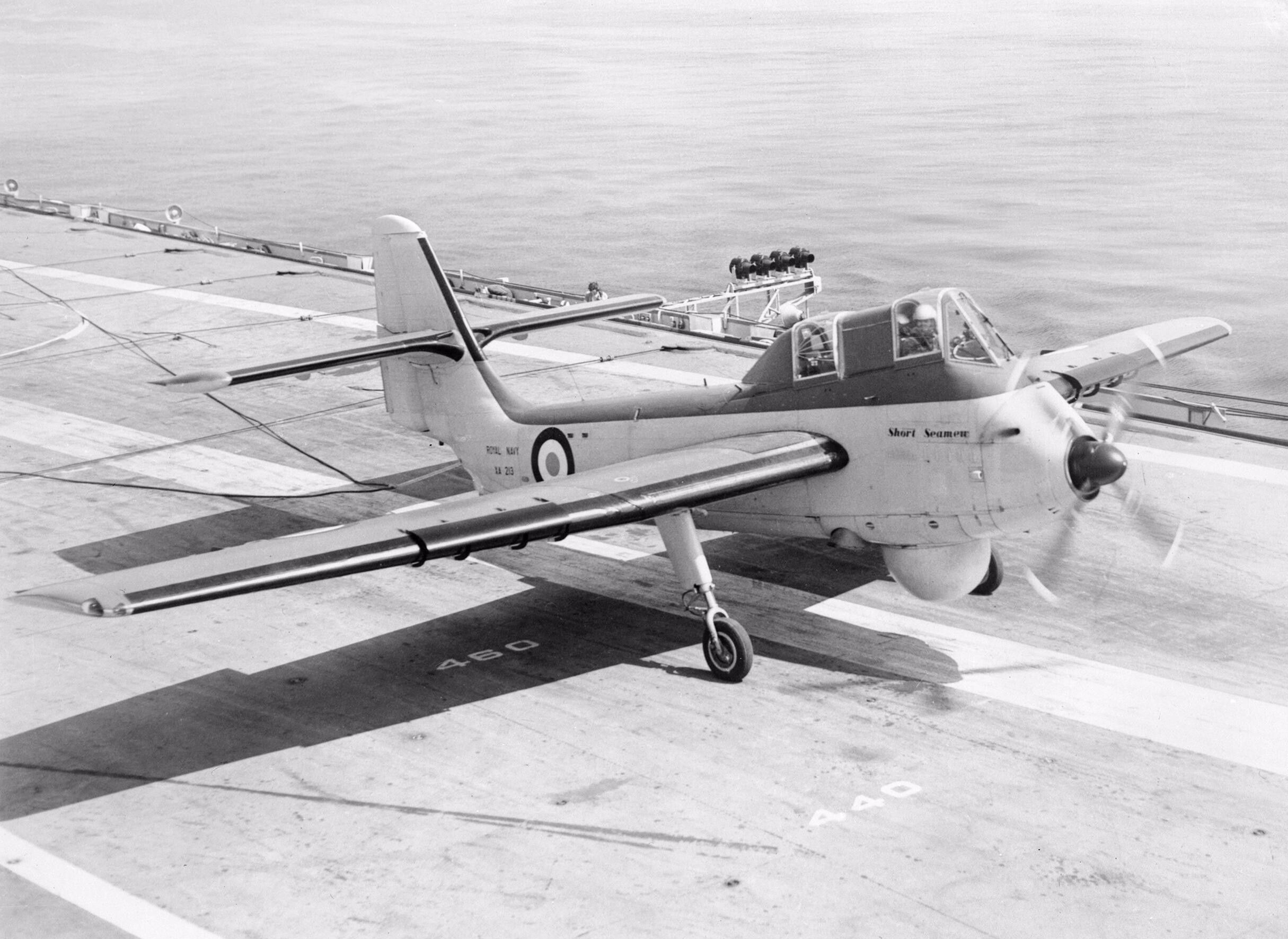
- A Seamew landing on HMS Bulwark (R08), 1955

General information
- Type: Anti-submarine aircraft
- Manufacturer: Short Brothers
- Primary users: Royal Navy Fleet Air Arm Royal Naval Volunteer Reserve
- Number built: 26

History
- First flight: 23 August 1953
- Retired: 1957

The Short SB.6 Seamew was a British aircraft designed in 1951 by David Keith-Lucas of Shorts as a lightweight anti-submarine platform to replace the Royal Navy Fleet Air Arm (FAA)'s Grumman Avenger AS 4 with the Reserve branch of the service. It first flew on 23 August 1953, but, due to poor performance coupled with shifting defence doctrine, it never reached service and only 24 production aircraft had flown before the project was cancelled.

== Design and development ==
The Short Seamew was selected to fulfill Admiralty Specification M.123D for a simple, lightweight anti-submarine aircraft capable of unassisted operation from any of the Royal Navy's aircraft carriers in all but the worst of conditions, in particular escort carriers which the UK still had in considerable numbers from the Second World War. Although specifically designed for naval operations, the Seamew was also intended for land-based use by the RAF. It was to be suitable for mass production and operation by the Air Branch of the Royal Naval Volunteer Reserve (RNVR). This specification was in response to the alarming increase in capabilities of the Soviet submarine forces following the Second World War.

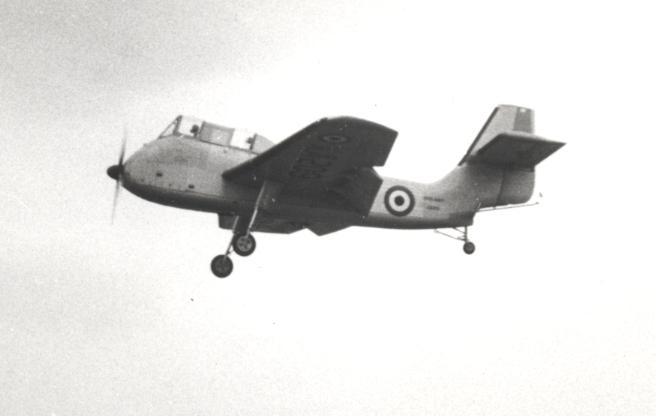
Seamew prototype XA209, natural metal finish, landing at Farnborough SBAC Show in September 1953

Three prototypes were ordered in April 1952 and the first flight (XA209), piloted by test pilot Sqn. Ldr. Walter J. "Wally" Runciman, took place on 23 August 1953. This same aircraft, also piloted by Runciman, took part in the 1953 Farnborough Airshow three weeks later. In 1954 both XA209 and the second prototype XA213 took part at Farnborough, where the following year both prototypes and two production AS Mk 1 models (XE171 and XE172) gave a formation display.

The fourth Seamew prototype (XE175) was flown by Runciman for a series of sales tours in 1956 to Italy (March), Yugoslavia (April) and West Germany (May). It was this same aircraft in which Runciman was killed when it crashed during the Sydenham (Belfast) Air Display on 9 June 1956, when he attempted a loop. Rumours that the crash had been caused by a material failure were current at the time, but the accident investigation board did not confirm them. (Note: John T. Davis, an Irish filmmaker, included film of the crash in his own film, The Uncle Jack (1996).)

The MR Mark 2 for use by Coastal Command was similar in every respect to the AS Mk 1 except that it was optimised for land-based use from hastily prepared airstrips. Naval equipment was deleted although manual wing folding was retained. Slightly heavier than the naval version, the MR Mk 2 had oversize low pressure tyres and could carry a higher weapons load.

=== Design ===
Wally Runciman climbs into the cockpit for the first flight of the Seamew XA209 prototype

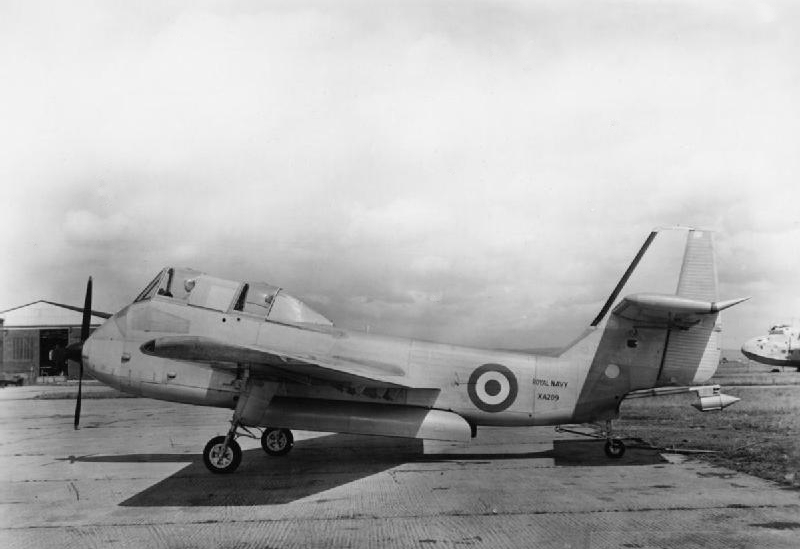
Prototype XA209, without radome, 1953.

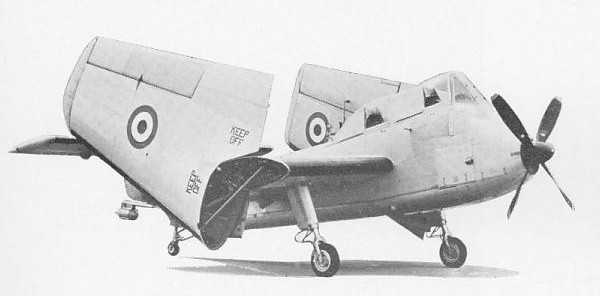
Prototype XA209 with wings folded

The pilot and observer were located in tandem cockpits located high up in the front of the deep, narrow fuselage, above the Armstrong Siddeley Mamba turboprop in front and the weapons bay behind. The design had originally called for the tried and tested Rolls-Royce Merlin piston engine but the Royal Navy had made it policy to phase out piston engines, in order that supplies of highly flammable high octane aviation fuel need not be carried in large quantities on ships. The turboprop engine also caused less airframe vibration so that the pilot could be seated directly over it; additionally the absence of a piston engine's ignition system which would have interfered with the radar scanner mounted below the engine housing.

For simplicity, and so that a nosewheel would not obscure the forward field of the radar scanner, a fixed tailwheel undercarriage was used. The long stroke necessary on the main undercarriage to allow for heavy deck landings while giving the radar scanner and propeller adequate clearance from the ground resulted in an alarming attitude on the ground and the cockpits mounted at a seemingly perilous height. For landing the tailwheel extended so it could land at a more level attitude.

The pilot and observer sat very far forward in order for the pilot to have a reasonable field of downward vision for takeoff and landing and so that both he and the observer had a good field of view for spotting surface vessels even when in level flight.

The large, broad-chord wings featured power-folding and pylons for the carriage of rockets, depth charges, flares and small bombs. The large, slab-like tailplane was mounted high on the vertical stabiliser, requiring the rudder to be split into upper and lower sections. The fixed undercarriage legs could be jettisoned in the event of ditching.

The weapons bay was 14 ft long and 3 ft wide. By omitting the rotating radar scanner, it could be extended to 17 ft in order to carry longer weapons.

=== Handling characteristics ===
The handling characteristics of the Seamew were poor. The prototypes were heavily modified with fixed leading-edge slats, slots added in the trailing-edge flaps, alterations to the ailerons and slats added to the tailplane roots. Although something of an improvement over the initial models, the handling was never wholly satisfactory. Arthur Pearcy wrote "only Short Brothers' test pilot Wally Runciman seemed able to outwit its vicious tendencies and exploit its latent manoeuvrability to the limit."

The stall speed of the Seamew was 50 knots and it required only 50% of engine power to maintain flight. Runciman said "take off and landing are simple and straightforward", "it is, in fact, impossible to bounce the Seamew", and that its performance in crosswinds was "outstanding".

== Operational history ==
A flight of Short Seamew AS 1s

An order was placed in February 1955 for 60 aircraft (split evenly between the FAA and RAF), with Seamew XA213 successfully completing carrier trials on HMS Bulwark in July and December 1955. Naval service flight trials with two Seamews were carried out with 700 Naval Air Squadron in November 1956, which included catapult trials and around 200 takeoffs and landings on HMS Warrior.

The RAF lost interest after four Mk 2s were built with three of them converted to AS1 standard; the fourth (XE175) was flown by S/L W. "Wally" J. Runciman for a series of sales tours in 1956 to Italy (March), Yugoslavia (April) and West Germany (May).

Meanwhile, the FAA decided that the RNVR Avengers would be replaced by Seamews, but only four had been taken on charge by the time the RNVR squadrons were disbanded in March 1957 in keeping with the 1957 Defence White Paper, before any Seamews were allocated to them. Seven aircraft eventually delivered to the FAA were scrapped at RNAS Lossiemouth, and the other 11, complete and awaiting delivery, were scrapped at Sydenham. The last surviving Seamew, XE180 which had been purchased by Shorts on 31 August 1959 for ground instruction at its Apprentice Training School, was scrapped in 1967.

The Rolls-Royce Heritage Trust owns several Armstrong Siddeley Mamba engines once fitted to Seamews.

== Variants ==
SB.6 Seamew
Three prototype anti-submarine aircraft, one completed as a structural test rig.
SB.6 Seamew AS.1
Production anti-submarine aircraft for the Royal Navy, 60 aircraft ordered later amended to 30 but only 24 completed.
SC.2 Seamew MR.2
Production aircraft for the Royal Air Force Coastal Command, larger wheels with low-pressure tyres, manual wing-folding and no deck handling gear, 30 aircraft ordered but only 4-built that were converted or completed to AS.1 standard.

== Operators ==
United Kingdom

- Royal Navy
- Royal Naval Reserve

== Specifications (Seamew AS 1) ==
Data from

General characteristics

- Crew: two
- Length: 41 ft 0 in (12.50 m)
- Wingspan: 55 ft 0 in (16.76 m) (23 ft 0 in (7.01 m) folded)
- Height: 13 ft 5 in (4.09 m) (15 ft 7.5 in (4.76 m) with wings folded)
- Wing area: 550 sq ft (51 m^{2})
- Empty weight: 9,795 lb (4,443 kg)
- Gross weight: 14,400 lb (6,532 kg)
- Max takeoff weight: 15,000 lb (6,804 kg)
- Powerplant: 1 × Armstrong Siddeley Mamba turboprop, 1,590 shp (1,190 kW)
- Propellers: 4-bladed Rotol, 10 ft 0 in (3.05 m) diameter

Performance

- Maximum speed: 236 mph (380 km/h, 205 kn)
- Range: 750 mi (1,210 km, 650 nmi)
- Endurance: 4 hr at 140 mph (120 kn; 230 km/h) and 5,000 ft (1,500 m)
- Rate of climb: 1,600 ft/min (8.1 m/s) initial
- Take off: 500 ft (150 m) at 69.9 kn (80.4 mph; 129.5 km/h) tas into 12 kn (14 mph; 22 km/h) wind

Armament

- Hardpoints: 1,844 lb (836 kg) of weapons
- Rockets: Several rockets carried underwing
- Bombs:
  - 1 × torpedo
  - 4 × depth charges
  - 275-lb A/S bombs
  - 20 × 28-lb Sonobuoys

Avionics

- ASV Mk. 19B radar (ARI 5838)

== See also ==
Aircraft of comparable role, configuration, and era

- Fairey Gannet
- Grumman Avenger
- Breguet Alizé
- Ilyushin Il-20 (1948)

Related lists

- List of aircraft of the Fleet Air Arm

== Bibliography ==
- Barnes, C.H. with revisions by Derek N. James. Shorts Aircraft since 1900(revised). London: Putnam, 1989. ISBN 0-85177-819-4.
- Green, William and Gerald Pollinger. The Observer's Book of Aircraft. London: Frederick Warne & Co. Ltd., 1956.
- Keith-Lucas, David. "Short Seamew." Flight, 20 January 1956, pp. 81–86.
- Pearcy, Arthur. "Short Seamew". Aviation News 6, 19 July 1990.
- Runciman, Squadron Leader W.J. Pilot's Flying Log Book. "Squadron Leader W.J. Runciman, A.F.C., D.F.M." Original held by his family, a copy held by P. Sortehaug, 4, William St., Dunedin, NZ.
- "The Seamew Calls a Halt to the Rising Cost of Air Power." Shorts Quarterly Review, Vol. 2, No. 3, Autumn 1953.
- The Short Seamew Light Anti-submarine Aircraft (promotional brochure). Belfast: Short Brothers and Harland Limited, c. 1953.
- Williams, Ray. Fly Navy: Aircraft of the Fleet Air Arm since 1945. London: Airlife Publishing, 1989. ISBN 1-85310-057-9.
- Warner, Guy (July–August 2002). "From Bombay to Bombardier: Aircraft Production at Sydenham, Part One". Air Enthusiast. No. 100. pp. 13–24. ISSN 0143-5450.
- Winchester, Jim, ed. "Short Seamew". The World's Worst Aircraft: From Pioneering Failures to Multimillion Dollar Disasters. London: Amber Books Ltd., 2005. ISBN 1-904687-34-2.
