= Granger Archaeopteryx =

British aircraft

Archaeopteryx
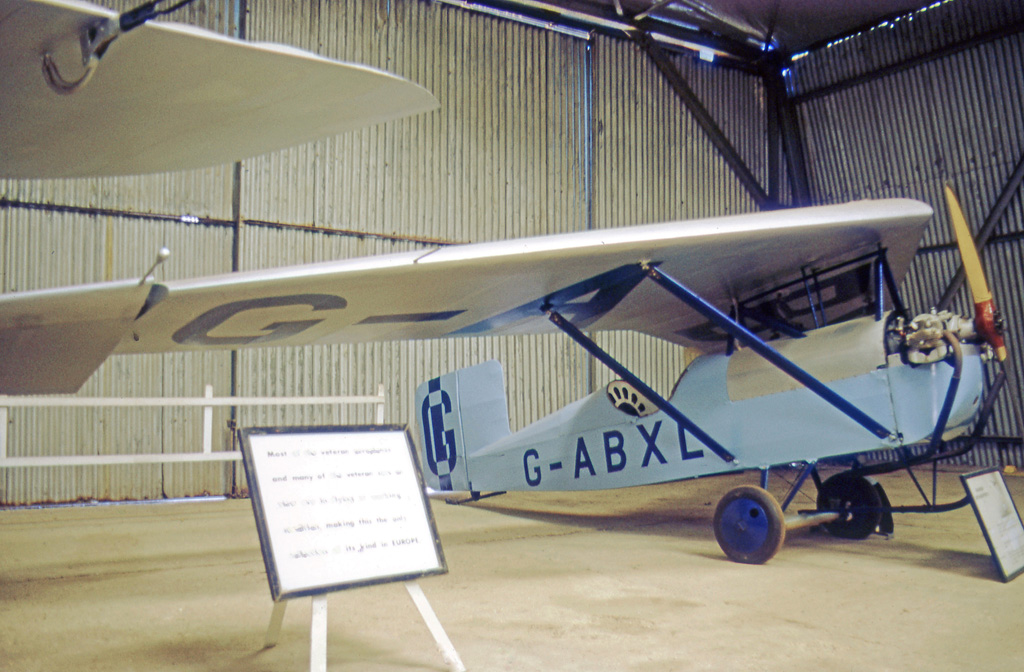
- The sole Archaeopteryx displayed in airworthy condition at the Shuttleworth Collection, Old Warden airfield, in 1972

General information
- Type: Light sport aircraft/experimental
- Manufacturer: F and J Granger
- Designer: F and J Granger, C.H. Latimer-Needham
- Status: Under restoration
- Number built: One

History
- First flight: October 1930

The Granger Archaeopteryx is a British single-engined, tailless parasol monoplane designed and built in the late 1920s by two brothers, R.F.T. and R.J.T. Granger. The sole example built is currently under restoration for flight.

== Design ==
The layout of the Archaeopteryx was inspired by the tailless swept-winged Westland-Hill Pterodactyl, itself derived from the aircraft of J. W. Dunne. These aircraft had been designed to resist stalling and to allow easy and safe recovery if they did.

The Archaeopteryx follows the Dunne D.7 in being a parasol wing monoplane, however it differs in being the first aircraft of tailless swept configuration to have a nose-mounted tractor propeller. Lateral and pitch control is via all-moving wing tips which act as elevons, as developed by Hill for the Pterodactyl. It also has a conventional vertical tail fin and rudder.

It is powered by a 32 horsepower (24 kW) Bristol Cherub engine.

== History ==
After seeing the success of the Westland-Hill Pterodactyl, the Granger brothers decided to build their own aircraft in which to learn to fly. They were also influenced by the designs of J. W. Dunne, and designed their machine with the assistance of C.H. Latimer-Needham.

Named after the Archaeopteryx prehistoric bird, the aircraft first flew at Hucknall near Nottingham in October 1930. It was not initially registered with the CAA and flew without markings until two years later when it was given the registration of G-ABXL on 3 June 1932.

The brothers both piloted the aircraft many times in the Nottingham area, and flew it as far as Hatfield in June 1935 to attend a flying display. Performance on the Bristol Cherub engine was marginal; as originally built the Archaeopteryx was an Ultralight and as such the performance was adequate, so long as the pilot weighed no more than 11 stone (150 lb; 70 kg). It was flown quite successfully for five years prior to its retirement. The aircraft proved difficult to control in pitch, especially on landing where a series of large bounces often developed. It was flown regularly between 1930 and 1936 before being stored for 30 years at the home of one of the Granger Brothers in Chilwell, Nottingham.

In the 1960s the designers realised the type's significance as a forerunner of modern swept wing aircraft, and on 28 April 1967, G-ABXL was presented to the Shuttleworth Collection by R.J.T. Granger where it was restored to an airworthy condition and flew again in June 1971 in the hands of Sqn.Ldr. J. Lewis. During the restoration a new throttle control was moved to a position outside of the fuselage and, with a pilot whose weight is at the limit, a positive climb rate can only be obtained by the pilot moving his arms and elbows into the cramped cockpit to minimise drag.

Ownership subsequently passed back to the Granger family in May 2002. The aircraft is once again being restored to flying condition.

== Specifications (Archaeopteryx) ==
Data from Jackson and Guttery.

General characteristics

- Crew: One
- Length: 14 ft 10 in (4.6 m)
- Wingspan: 27 ft 6 in (8.2 m)
- Wing area: 102 sq ft (9.5 m^{2})
- Airfoil: RAF 340 series
- Empty weight: 400 lb (181.4 kg)
- Gross weight: 612 lb (277.6 kg)
- Powerplant: × Bristol Cherub I , 32 hp (24 kW)

Performance

- Maximum speed: 95 mph (153 km/h, 83 kn)
- Cruise speed: 75 mph (121 km/h, 65 kn)
- Stall speed: 37 mph (60 km/h, 32 kn)

== See also ==
- Homebuilt aircraft

Aircraft of comparable role, configuration, and era

- Westland-Hill Pterodactyl
- Waterman Arrowplane
