= Control reversal =

Aeronautical phenomenon

Control reversal is an adverse effect on the controllability of aircraft. The flight controls reverse themselves in a way that is not intuitive, so pilots may not be aware of the situation; to roll to the left, they have to push the control stick to the right, the opposite of the normal direction.

== Causes ==
There are several causes for this problem, pilot error, effects of high-speed flight, incorrectly connected controls and various coupling forces on the aircraft.

=== Equipment malfunction ===
Equipment failure may cause flight controls to behave unexpectedly, for example the possible rudder reversal experienced on board United Airlines Flight 585.

=== Pilot error ===
Pilot error is the most common cause of control reversal. In unusual attitudes it is not uncommon for the pilot to become disoriented and make incorrect control movements to regain level flight. This is particularly common when using helmet-mounted display systems, which introduce graphics that remain steady in the pilot's view, notably when using a particular form of attitude display known as an inside-out.

=== Incorrectly connected controls ===
Incorrectly connected controls are another common cause of this problem. It is a recurring problem after maintenance on aircraft, notably home built designs that are being flown for the first time after some minor work. It is not entirely uncommon on commercial aircraft, and has been the cause of several accidents including the crash of the Short Crusader before the 1927 Schneider Trophy and the 1947 death of Avro designer Roy Chadwick.

=== Wing twist ===
Another manifestation of the problem occurs when the amount of airflow over the wing becomes so great that the force generated by the ailerons is enough to twist the wing itself, due to insufficient torsional stiffness of the wing structure. For instance when the aileron is deflected upwards to make that wing move down, the wing twists in the opposite direction. The net result is that the airflow is directed down instead of up and the wing moves upward, opposite of what was expected. This form of control reversal is often lumped in with a number of "high speed" effects as compressibility.

== Examples ==
=== Wright Brothers glider ===
The Wright Brothers suffered a form of control reversal, normally referred to as adverse yaw. In their 1902 glider they continued to encounter a problem where the glider would roll in one direction but yaw in the reverse direction. They eventually cured the problem by adding a movable rudder system, which is now found on nearly all aircraft.

The root cause of the problem was dynamic. Warping the wing did what was expected in terms of lift, thereby rolling the plane, but also had an effect on drag. The result was that the upward-moving wing was dragged backwards, yawing the glider. If this yaw was violent enough, the additional speed on the lower wing as it was driven forward would make it generate more lift, and reverse the direction of the roll.

=== Supermarine Spitfire ===
Due to the high speeds at which the Supermarine Spitfire could dive, this problem of aileron reversal became apparent when it was wished to increase the lateral maneuverability (rate of roll) by increasing the aileron area. The aircraft had a wing designed originally for an aileron reversal airspeed of 580 mph. Any attempt to increase the aileron area would have resulted in the wing twisting when the larger ailerons were applied at high speed, so that the aircraft would have rolled in the opposite direction to that which was intended by the pilot. The problem of increasing the rate of roll was temporarily alleviated with the introduction of "clipped" wing tips (to reduce the aerodynamic load on the tip area, allowing larger ailerons to be used) until a new, stiffer wing could be incorporated. This new wing was introduced in the Mk 21 and had a theoretical aileron reversal speed of 825 mph (1,328 km/h).

=== Boeing B-47 ===
The Boeing B-47 was speed limited at low altitudes because the large, flexible wings would cancel out the effect of the control surfaces under some circumstances.

=== Gossamer Condor ===
Control reversal also affected the Gossamer Condor, the Kremer Prize-winning human-powered airplane. When a wing warping mechanism was tried as a solution to a long-running turning problem, the effect was to turn the airplane in the opposite direction to that expected by conventional airplane knowledge. When the Condor was rigged "conventionally", the inside wing slowed down so much that it settled to the ground. By employing "backwards" wired wing-warping, the inside wingtip angle of attack was increased so that the added drag slowed that wing while the added lift allowed the airfoil to stay aloft at a slower speed. The tilted canard could then complete the turn.
