= Geoffrey T. R. Hill =

British aeronautical engineer (1895–1955)

Geoffrey Terence Roland Hill
- Born: 1895; Hampstead, London, England
- Died: 26 December 1955 (aged 60); Swindon, Wiltshire, England
- Occupation: Aeronautical engineer
- Known for: Tailless aircraft designs
- Aviation career
- Rank: Captain

Geoffrey Terence Roland Hill, MC, FRAeS (1895 – 26 December 1955) was a British aviator and aeronautical engineer.

== Early life ==
Geoffrey Terence Roland Hill was born in 1895, the son of Michael J. M. Hill, Professor of Mathematics at the University College London, and his wife Minnie. He was educated at University College School. While he was in his early teens he won prizes as a builder of model aircraft. In 1912, with his younger brother, Roderic, they built a model aircraft for the Children's Exhibition at Olympia, which was followed by a nearly-successful full-sized glider. Subsequently, he went up to University College, where he obtained a Bachelor of Science in 1914 and joined the Royal Aircraft Factory as a graduate apprentice.

== Flying career ==
By 1916 Hill had learnt to fly and became a test pilot at the Royal Aircraft Factory. He obtained a commission in the Royal Flying Corps as 2nd lieutenant, and fought in France with No. 29 Squadron. In late 1916 he was awarded the Military Cross and in January 1917 he was promoted to the rank of captain (temporary). Invalided home, he moved back into test flying and by 1918 he was in command of the Aerodynamics Flight at the Royal Aircraft Establishment. When the war ended he joined Handley Page, Ltd., as their chief test pilot/aerodynamicist, and in 1919 climbed a Handley page W.8 up to nearly 14,000 feet (4,300 m) – then, a world record for an aircraft of 1,500 kilograms (3,300 lb) all-up weight.

== Aeronautics ==
Hill designed a series of tailless aircraft, the Westland-Hill Pterodactyls, from the 1920s onwards. After the last Pterodactyl flew in 1932, he ended his association with Westland Aircraft in order to take up a chair as professor of sngineering science at London University.

In 1939 he headed a project in Pawlett, near Bridgwater, Somerset, investigating methods for cutting the cables on enemy barrage balloons; recovery from stalling after contact with such cables was an important part of his work there.

Hill was British Scientific Liaison Officer at the National Research Council (NRC) in Canada in the mid-1940s. There, he made the proposal for the NRC tailless glider for the study of the control and stability of tailless aircraft. The glider design was built and flew from 1946 until the project ended around 1950.

Hill proposed the "aero-isoclinic" wing in 1951, in an attempt to control the undesirable effects of bending in the long, thin swept wings then becoming widespread. He subsequently worked with David Keith-Lucas of Short Brothers on the design of the experimental Short SB.4 Sherpa, another tailless design, which test-flew the wing.

== Personal life ==
Hill married May Alexander on 10 October 1918 in Carrickmore, County Tyrone.

== Bibliography ==
- Buttler, Tony (May–June 1999). "Control at the Tips: Aero-isoclinics and Their Influence on Design". Air Enthusiast (81): 50–55. ISSN 0143-5450.
