= Torsional instability =

Mechanical phenomenon where twisting forces cause sudden structural deformation

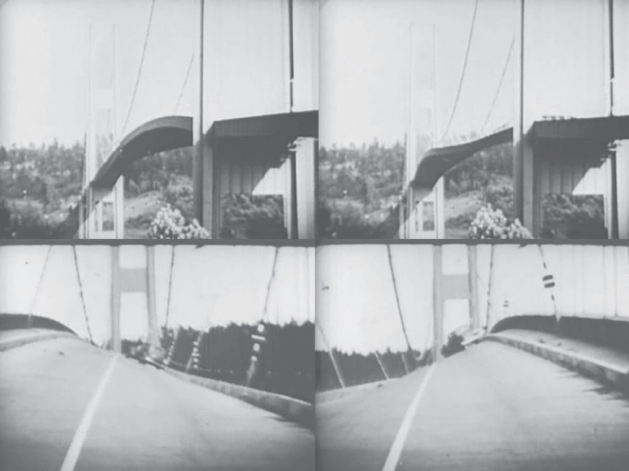
Stills from footage of the Tacoma Narrows Bridge wobbling and eventually, collapsing, 7 November, 1940, filmed by Barney Elliot. The cause has been attributed to wind conditions causing torsional instability of the bridge.

Torsional instability is a mechanical phenomenon where a structural element subjected to twisting (torsional) forces undergoes sudden deformation or failure beyond a critical torque threshold. This instability is characterized by a rapid transition from stable twisting to helical buckling, kinking, or collapse, often observed in slender rods, beams, and architectural structures.

== Examples ==
The Dee Bridge collapsed in 1847 after adding extra weight to the bridge in the form of rocks and gravel to reduce track vibration, but lead to a critical point of torsional instability. The Tacoma Narrows Bridge collapsed in 1940 due to specific wind conditions that were exacerbated by torsional oscillations, transitioning from vertical to destructive twisting modes. In the 1970s, occupants of the top floors of the John Hancock Tower reported feeling motion sickness, which was later revealed to be due to torsional instability of the building.

This phenomenon is also known to happen to drill strings and pipelines, buckling under rotational loads in oil/gas extraction, as well as aircraft wings, experiencing torsional flutter under aerodynamic forces.

== Mitigation strategies ==
A way to reduce the chance of torsional instability is by making cross-sections stiffer. This can be done by choosing shapes that naturally resist twisting, like hollow tubes or cross-shaped sections, instead of shapes like flat plates, which twist more easily. Stiffer cross-sections provide more resistance to the twisting force and help the structure remain stable. Another way is by implementing braces, which are structural components that provide extra stability and strength to a building or structure. For example, twisting a scaffold is harder than twisting a ladder because the scaffold has braces that resist twisting, making it much stiffer and more stable than the ladder. Similarly, bracing systems in a building distribute forces and provide resistance against torsion.

In addition to modifying the shape and bracing, engineers can use materials to make structures stronger and lighter at the same time. These materials include composites like carbon fiber or hybrid materials that are better at resisting twisting forces than traditional steel or concrete. For example, bridges or buildings made with these materials can carry heavy loads and resist twisting without becoming overly bulky or heavy.

Engineers also rely on mathematical models and computer simulations to predict how a structure will respond to torsional forces under different conditions, such as strong winds, earthquakes, or heavy traffic. These digital tools allow engineers to analyze and optimize their designs before construction begins, ensuring the structure can handle these forces while still being safe, functional, and cost-efficient.

== See also ==
- Torsion (mechanics)
- Buckling
- Elastic instability
- Shear modulus
- Polar moment of inertia
