= Keith Lucas (neuroscientist) =

British scientist

Captain Keith Lucas

Keith Lucas FRS (8 March 1879, Greenwich – 5 October 1916, Salisbury Plain) was a British scientist who carried out pioneering work in neuroscience at Trinity College, Cambridge. At Trinity his experimental work focused on the physiology of nerve and muscle, particularly the processes of excitation and the development of more precise apparatus for recording electrical responses.

He was the son of Francis Robert and Katharine Mary (née Riddle) Lucas. He was educated at Rugby School and Trinity College, Cambridge where he graduated BA with a first-class in natural sciences in 1901. In 1902 he worked in New Zealand, on the bathymetrical survey of the lakes, and he became a Fellow of Trinity in 1904. In 1907 he became an additional university demonstrator in physiology, and in 1908 a lecturer in natural sciences.

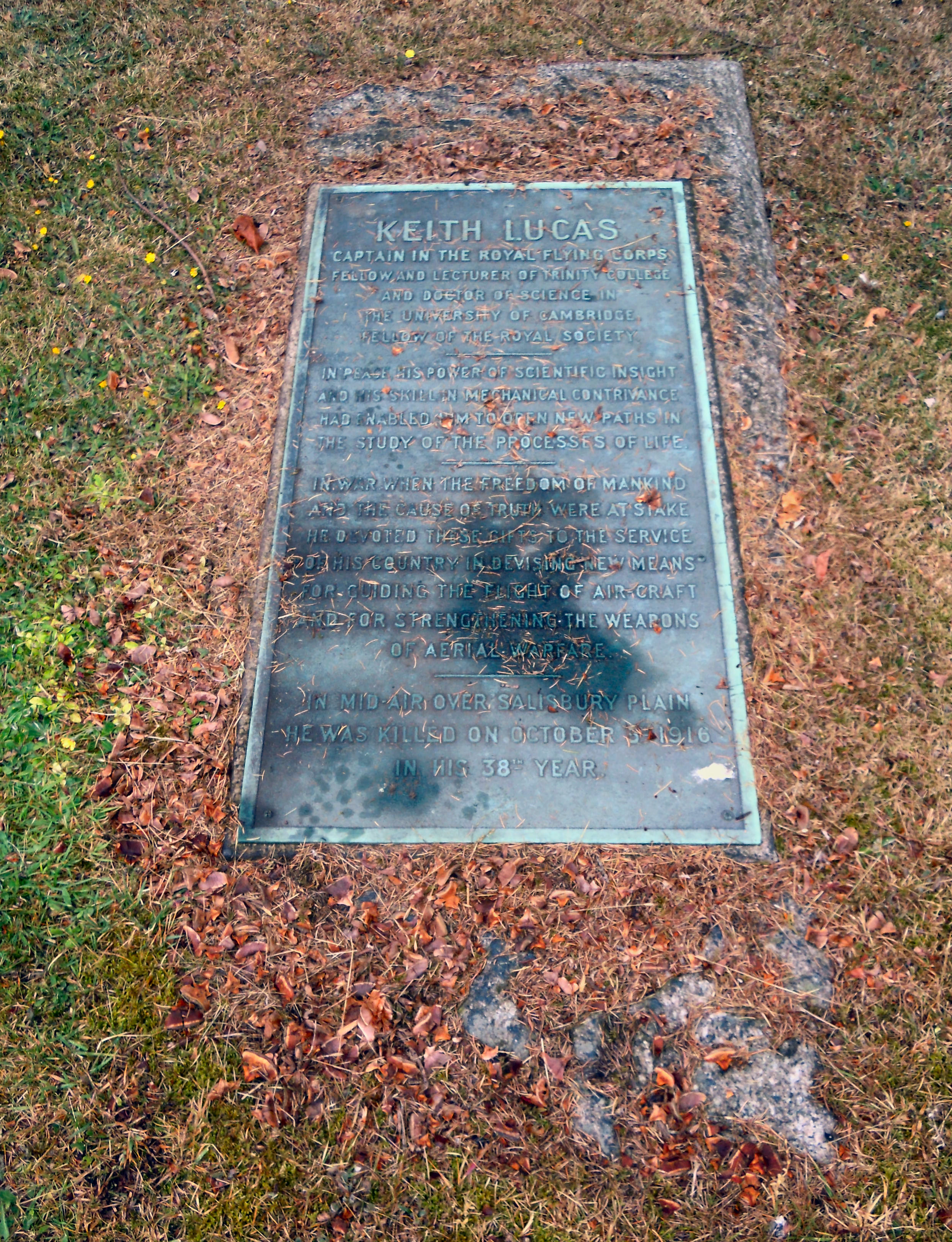
The grave of Keith Lucas in Aldershot Military Cemetery

He delivered the Royal Society Croonian Lecture in 1912. He was elected a Fellow of the Royal Society in 1913; his candidacy citation read: "Fellow of Trinity College, Cambridge. Lecturer on Physiology. Has made important contributions to physiological science, especially in relation to the processes of excitation ... Much of the work was only made possible by the highly ingenious improvements designed by the author in the apparatus used."

During the First World War, as a captain in the Hampshire Aircraft Parks Royal Flying Corps (TA), based at the Royal Aircraft Establishment, Farnborough, he was engaged in experimental research into aerial navigation and early aeroplane compasses.

Convinced that his experimental work in aviation would improve if he became a pilot, he attended a flying course at Upavon, where he was instantly killed on 5 October 1916, aged 37, when his aircraft BE2c 5389 collided in mid-air over Salisbury Plain with BE2c 4174, flown by 2Lt Geoffrey Plateras Lawson Jacques of the Central Flying School, who was also killed. Lucas is buried at Aldershot Military Cemetery, and is commemorated on the War memorial of Fen Ditton, Cambridgeshire

After his death his wife Alys changed the family name, and, as Alys Keith-Lucas, edited a short book giving his background together with reminiscences of him and a list of his publications. They had three sons, who each became professors: Alan Keith-Lucas, David Keith-Lucas and Bryan Keith-Lucas.
