= Grumman XTB2F =

American torpedo bomber aircraft design

TB2F
- Mockup of the XTB2F

General information
- Type: Torpedo bomber
- Manufacturer: Grumman
- Status: Cancelled at mockup stage

The Grumman TB2F was a cancelled twin-engined torpedo bomber project, intended as Grumman's successor to the successful TBF Avenger. However, only a mockup was ever constructed.

In 1944, during World War II, the Midway class aircraft carriers were being built, and Grumman attempted to design a new torpedo bomber to accompany those carriers. However, it was soon decided that, among other difficulties, it would be impractical to efficiently deploy twin-engined aircraft of this size from an aircraft carrier, and the plans were shelved.

== Specifications ==
Data from A Tracker Before Its Time?

General characteristics

- Crew: 3
- Length: 52 ft 0 in (15.85 m)
- Wingspan: 74 ft 0 in (22.56 m) (Folded span: 36 ft 0 in (10.97 m))
- Height: 17 ft 0 in (5.18 m)
- Max takeoff weight: 43,937 lb (19,929 kg)
- Fuel capacity: 1,960 US Gallon internal fuel
- Powerplant: 2 × Pratt & Whitney R-2800-22 Double Wasp radial engine, 2,100 hp (1,600 kW) each

Performance

- Maximum speed: 271 kn (312 mph, 502 km/h)
- Stall speed: 61.8 kn (71.1 mph, 114.4 km/h)
- Ferry range: 2,352 nmi (2,707 mi, 4,356 km)
- Service ceiling: 31,600 ft (9,600 m)

Armament

- Guns:
  - 1× 75 mm cannon and 6× .50 in (12.7 mm) machine guns forward firing
  - 2× .50 in machine guns each in dorsal and ball turrets
- Bombs: 1× Mark 13 torpedo or 3,500 lb (1,600 kg) bombs or mines in bomb bay

== See also ==
Aircraft of comparable role, configuration, and era

- Douglas TB2D Skypirate
- Grumman AF Guardian

Related lists

- List of United States Navy aircraft designations (pre-1962)
- List of military aircraft of the United States
