= An Experiment with Time =

1927 book by J. W. Dunne

- 1934 Faber & Faber edition
- Author: J. W. Dunne
- Language: English
- Subjects: Precognitive dreams and Time
- Publisher: A. & C. Black; Faber & Faber
- Publication date: 1927
- Publication place: United Kingdom
- Media type: Print (Hardcover and Paperback)
- Pages: 208pp
- ISBN: 1-57174-234-4
- OCLC: 46396413
- LC Class: MLCM 2004/02936 (B)

An Experiment with Time is a book by the British soldier, aeronautical engineer and philosopher J. W. Dunne (1875–1949) about his precognitive dreams and a theory of time which he later called "Serialism". First published in March 1927, the book was widely read. Although never accepted by mainstream scientists or philosophers, it has influenced imaginative literature ever since. Dunne published four sequels: The Serial Universe (1934), The New Immortality (1938), Nothing Dies (1940) and Intrusions? (1955).

== Description ==
=== Overview ===
An Experiment with Time discusses two main topics.

The first half of the book describes a number of precognitive dreams, most of which Dunne himself had experienced. His key conclusion was that such precognitive visions foresee future personal experiences by the dreamer and not more general events.

The second half develops a theory which is able to explain them. Dunne's starting point is the observation that the moment of "now" is not described by science. Contemporary science described physical time as a fourth dimension and Dunne's argument led to an endless sequence of higher dimensions of time to measure our passage through the dimension below. Accompanying each level was a higher level of consciousness. At the end of the chain was a supreme ultimate observer.

According to Dunne, our wakeful attention prevents us from seeing beyond the present moment, whilst when dreaming that attention fades and we gain the ability to recall more of our timeline. This allows fragments of our future to appear in pre-cognitive dreams, mixed in with fragments or memories of our past. Other consequences include the phenomenon known as deja vu and the existence of life after death.

=== Dreams and the experiment ===
Following a discussion of brain function in which Dunne expounds mind-brain parallelism and highlights the problem of subjective experience, he gives anecdotal accounts of precognitive dreams which, for the most part, he himself had experienced.

The first he records occurred in 1898, in which he dreamed of his watch stopping at an exact time before waking up and finding that it had in fact done so. Later dreams appeared to foretell several major disasters; a volcanic eruption in Martinique, a factory fire in Paris, and the derailing of the Flying Scotsman express train from the embankment approaching the Forth Railway Bridge in Scotland.

Dunne tells how he sought to make sense of these dreams, coming slowly to the conclusion that they foresaw events from his own future, such as reading a newspaper account of a disaster rather than foreseeing the disaster itself. In order to try and prove this to his satisfaction, he developed the experiment which gives the book its title. He kept a notepad by his bedside and wrote down details of any dreams immediately on waking, then later went back and compared them to subsequent events in his life. He also persuaded some friends to try the same experiment, as well as experimenting on himself with waking reveries approaching a hypnagogic state.

Based on the results, he claimed that they demonstrated that such precognitive fragments were common in dreams, even that they were mixed up in equal occurrence with past memories, and therefore they were difficult to identify until after the event they foresaw. He believed that the dreaming mind was not drawn wholly to the present, as it was during wakefulness, but was able to perceive events in its past and future with equal facility.

=== The theory of Serialism ===
Dunne had presented his evidence for precognition, in order to prepare the reader for the extraordinary theory which followed.

The theory harks back to an experience with his nurse when he was nine years old. Already thinking about the problem, the boy asked her if Time was the moments like yesterday, today and tomorrow, or was it the travelling between them that we experience as the present moment? Any answer was beyond her, but the observation formed the basis of Serialism.

Within the fixed spacetime landscape described by the recently published theory of general relativity, an observer travels along a timeline running in the direction of physical time, t_{1}. Quantum mechanics was also a newly emerging science, though in a less-developed state. Neither relativity nor quantum mechanics offered any explanation of the observer's place in spacetime, but both required it in order to develop the physical theory around it. The philosophical problems raised by this lack of rigorous foundation were already beginning to be recognised.

The theory resolves the issue by proposing a higher dimension of Time, t_{2}, in which our consciousness experiences its travelling along the timeline in t_{1}. The physical brain itself inhabits only t_{1}, requiring a second level of mind to inhabit t_{2} and it is at this level that the observer experiences consciousness.

However, Dunne found that his logic led to a similar difficulty with t_{2} in that the passage between successive events in t_{2} was not included in the model. This led to an even higher t_{3} in which a third-level observer could experience not just the mass of events in t_{2} but the passage of those experiences in t_{2}, and so on in the infinite regress of time dimensions and observers which gives the theory its name.

Dunne suggested that when we die, it is only our physical selves in t_{1} who die and that our higher selves are outside of mundane time. Our conscious selves therefore have no mechanism to die in the same kind of way and are effectively immortal. At the end of the chain he proposed a "superlative general observer, the fount of all ... consciousness".

== Publishing history ==
An Experiment with Time was first published by A & C Black in March 1927. Dunne continued to update it and many new editions and impressions were published over his lifetime. Black brought out a 1929 second edition, prefaced with editorial notes and an extract from a 1928 letter from Arthur Eddington. Dunne then changed publisher to Faber & Faber, with whom he would remain. The third edition incorporated major new material and was published by Faber's in 1932; this and subsequent editions were published in the US by Macmillan. The final version which he had a hand in was published as a "reprint" in 1948.

Faber continued printing paperback editions until at least 1973, and others have appeared since.

== Reception ==
=== Academic ===
Initial reactions from the scientific and scientifically-minded community were broadly positive. Nature carried a review by the philosopher and mathematician Hyman Levy. They accepted that Dunne was a sober and rational investigator who was doing his best to take a scientific approach. They acknowledged that if his ideas about time and consciousness were true then his book would be truly revolutionary. However opinions differed over the existence of dream precognition, while his infinite regress was almost universally judged to be logically flawed and incorrect.

Philosophers who criticised An Experiment with Time on much the same basis included J. A. Gunn, C. D. Broad and M. F. Cleugh.

The physicist and parapsychologist G. N. M. Tyrrell explained:

Mr. J. W. Dunne, in his book, An Experiment with Time, introduces a multidimensional scheme in an attempt to explain precognition and he has further developed this scheme in later publications. But, as Professor Broad has shown, these unlimited dimensions are unnecessary, ... and the true problem of time—the problem of becoming, or the passage of events from future through present to past, is not explained by them but is still left on the author's hands at the end.

Later editions continued to receive attention. In 1981 a new impression of the 1934 (third) edition was published with an introduction by the writer and broadcaster Brian Inglis. A review of it in New Scientist described it as a "definitive classic". The last (1948) edition was reprinted in 2001 with an introduction by the physicist and parapsychologist Russell Targ. The book was again republished by Dover in 2022.

Mainstream scientific opinion remains that, while Dunne was an entertaining writer, there is no scientific evidence for either dream precognition or more than one time dimension and his arguments do not convince.

=== Popular ===
An Experiment with Time became well known and was widely discussed. Not to have read him became a "mark of singularity" in society. Critical essays on Serialism — some positive, some negative — appeared in popular works. Among others, H. G. Wells wrote an essay, "New Light on Mental Life: Mr. J.W. Dunne’s Experiments with Dreaming" in 1927, Jorge Luis Borges wrote a short essay, "El Tiempo y J. W. Dunne" (Time and J. W. Dunne) in 1940. and J. B. Priestley gave an accessible account in his study Man and Time (1964). Interest remains today, with for example Gary Lachman discussing Dunne's Serialism in 2022.

== Sequels ==
Besides issuing new editions of An Experiment with Time, Dunne published sequels exploring different aspects of Serialism. The Serial Universe (1934) examined its relation to contemporary physics in relativity and quantum mechanics. The New Immortality (1938) and Nothing Dies (1940) explored the metaphysical aspect of Serialism, especially in relation to immortality. Intrusions? (1955) contained autobiographical accounts of the angelic visions and voices which had accompanied many of his precognitive dreams. It was incomplete at the time of his death in 1949; it was completed with the help of his family and finally published some years later. It revealed that he believed himself to be a spiritual medium. He had deliberately chosen to leave this material out of An Experiment with Time as he judged that it would have affected the scientific reception of his theory.

== Literary influence ==
The popularity of An Experiment with Time was reflected in the many authors who subsequently referenced Dunne and his ideas in literary works of fiction. He "undoubtedly helped to form something of the imaginative climate of those [interwar] years". One of the first and most significant writers was J. B. Priestley, who used Dunne's ideas in three of his "Time plays": Time and the Conways, Dangerous Corner, and An Inspector Calls.

Dunne's theory strongly influenced the unfinished novels The Notion Club Papers by J. R. R. Tolkien and The Dark Tower by C. S. Lewis. Tolkien and Lewis were both members of the Inklings literary circle. Tolkien used Dunne's ideas about parallel time dimensions in developing the differing natures of time in The Lord of the Rings between "Lórien time" and time in the rest of Middle-earth. Lewis used the imagery of serialism in the afterlife he depicted at the end of The Last Battle, the closing tale in the Chronicles of Narnia.

Other important contemporary writers who used his ideas, whether as a narrative or literary device, included John Buchan (The Gap in the Curtain), James Hilton (Random Harvest), his old friend H. G. Wells (The Queer Story of Brownlow’s Newspaper and The Shape of Things to Come), Graham Greene (The Bear Fell Free) and Rumer Godden (A Fugue in Time). Literary figures less overtly influenced included T. S. Eliot, James Joyce and Flann O'Brien.

Following Dunne's death in 1949, the popularity of his themes continued. In Philip Jose Farmer's 1952 science fiction novella The Lovers (expanded into a novel in 1961 & '79) the religion of the Haijac Union derives from Isaac Sigman, a messianic figure of a thousand years prior to the events of the story. Sigmanism is the belief system of the "Sturch" (state-church) and it is clear that it is an elaboration, or variant, of Judaism. It incorporates Dunne's "Serialism" with an extremely oppressive and coersive theocracy. Philippa Pearce's 1958 childhood fantasy Tom's Midnight Garden makes use of Dunne's theory of time and won the British literary Carnegie Medal. The writer Vladimir Nabokov undertook his own dream experiment in 1964, following Dunne's instructions, and it strongly influenced his subsequent novels, especially Ada or Ardor: A Family Chronicle.

== See also ==
- Dreamtime, an Australian aboriginal merging of past, present and future.
- C. H. Hinton, an early proponent of time as the fourth dimension who influenced Dunne.
- P. D. Ouspensky, who proposed an alternative theory of cyclic time.
