= J. W. Dunne =

British soldier, aeronautical engineer and philosopher

John William Dunne
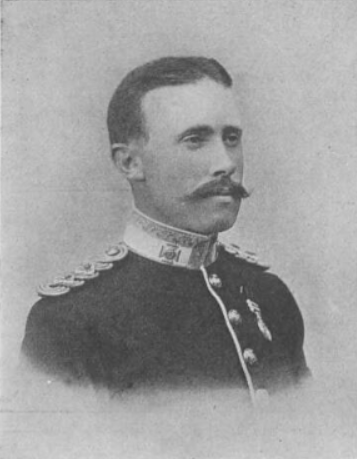
- Born: 2 December 1875; Curragh Camp, County Kildare, Ireland
- Died: 24 August 1949 (aged 73); Banbury, England
- Occupations: Soldier; Aeronaut; Philosopher
- Spouse: Hon. Cicely Marion Violet Joan Twisleton-Wykeham-Fiennes
- Children: John Geoffrey Christopher Dunne; Rosemary Elizabeth Cecily Dunne
- Parent(s): General Sir John Hart Dunne; Julia Elizabeth Dunne

John William Dunne FRAeS (2 December 1875 – 24 August 1949) was a British soldier, aeronautical engineer and philosopher. As a young man he fought in the Second Boer War, before becoming a pioneering aeroplane designer in the early years of the 20th century. Dunne worked on automatically stable aircraft, many of which were of tailless swept wing design, to achieve the first aircraft demonstrated to be stable. He later developed a new approach to dry fly fishing before turning to speculative philosophy, where he achieved some prominence and literary influence through his "serialism" theory on the nature of time and consciousness, first set out in his 1927 book An Experiment with Time.

== Biography ==
John William Dunne was born on 2 December 1875 in Curragh Camp, a British Army establishment in County Kildare, Ireland. He was the oldest son of Irishman Sir John Hart Dunne KCB (1835–1924) and his English wife Julia Elizabeth Dunne (née Chapman). Despite being born in Ireland of an Irish father, he had an English mother and was born in Ireland only because his father was Lieutenant-Colonel of the British 99th (Lanarkshire) Regiment, who happened to be stationed there at the time.

He spent most of his childhood and subsequent career in England. At an early age he suffered a bad accident and was confined to bed for several years. During this time he became interested in philosophy. While still only nine years old he asked his nurse about the nature of time. At the age of 13 he had a dream in which he was in a flying machine that needed no steering.

=== Military career ===
Following the outbreak of the Second Boer War, Dunne volunteered for the Imperial Yeomanry as an ordinary Trooper and fought in South Africa under General Roberts. In 1900 he was caught up in an epidemic of typhoid fever and was invalided home.

Recovered and commissioned as a Second Lieutenant in the Wiltshire Regiment on 28 August 1901, he went back to South Africa to serve a second tour in March 1902. He fell ill again and was diagnosed with heart disease, causing him to again return home the next year. Much of his remaining time in the Army would be spent on aeronautical work while on sick leave.

=== Aeronautics ===
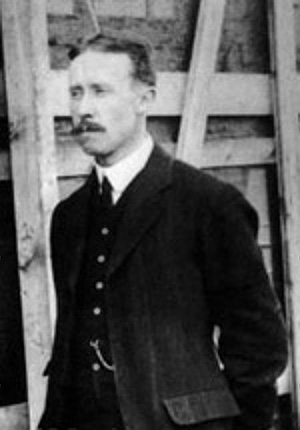
As a civilian pioneer

While on Army sick leave in 1901, Dunne began a systematic study of flight. His first attempted model was inspired by a Jules Verne novel but failed to fly. Like many other pioneers he closely observed birds in flight. However, unlike most, he was convinced that a safe aeroplane needed to have inherent aerodynamic stability. Encouraged among others by H. G. Wells, whom he befriended in 1902, he made a great number of small test models which eventually led to the development of a stable tailless swept wing configuration.

On his return to England for the second time he resumed his study of flight and by 1906 had developed a tailless, swept-wing "arrowhead" configuration which was inherently stable and would become his trademark.

At the request of Colonel John Capper, the unit's commanding officer, in June 1906 he was assigned to the new Army Balloon Factory in South Farnborough. Dunne wanted to construct a monoplane, but at the time the Army demanded biplanes and Capper instructed him accordingly.

A manned glider, the D.1, with provision for fitting engines and propellers, was constructed under great secrecy and, in July 1907, was taken to Blair Atholl in the Scottish Highlands for flight testing. On its one successful flight, Capper flew it for just long enough to demonstrate its stability before crashing into a wall. It was repaired and fitted with its powered chassis, but was damaged on its first and only attempted flight when the takeoff trolley veered off course.

In the winter of 1907–1908 Dunne designed the Dunne-Huntington triplane and a smaller glider, the D.2, to test the design. The glider was not built but the full-scale craft would eventually be built by A. K. Huntington and flown successfully from 1910.

The 1908 season at Blair Atholl saw two new machines brought up from Farnborough, the D.3 glider and the D.4 powered aeroplane. The glider flew well at the hands of Lt. Launcelot Gibbs, while the D.4 had limited success being badly underpowered and consequently, in Dunne's words, "more a hopper than a flyer".

Dunne returned to the Balloon Factory in the midst of a Government Inquiry into military aeronautics. As a result of its findings the War Office stopped all work on powered aircraft and in the spring of 1909 Dunne left the Balloon Factory. By now, he was also an official in the Aeronautical Society.

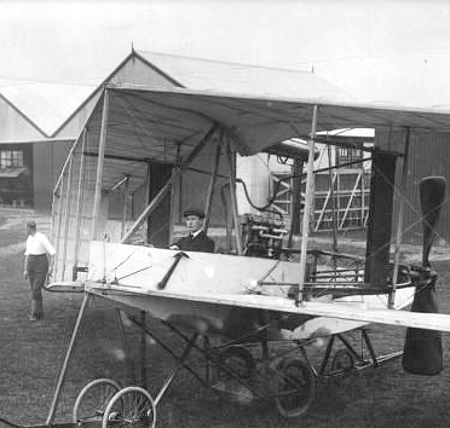
Dunne in his D.5.

With his friends' financial investment Dunne formed the Blair Atholl Aeroplane Syndicate to continue his experiments and took up hangar space on the Aero Club's new flying ground at Eastchurch on the Isle of Sheppey. Short Brothers had a manufacturing facility there and were contracted to build the D.5, a broadly similar biplane in which Dunne installed a more powerful 35 hp Green engine. Following a series of increasingly successful flights, on 20 December 1910 Dunne demonstrated the inherent stability of the D.5 to an amazed audience who included two official observers, Orville Wright and Griffith Brewer, making it the first aeroplane to be demonstrably stable in flight. He was able to take both hands off the controls and make notes on a piece of paper.

Dunne's next design, free of Army influence, was a monoplane, the D.6, which was built by his former commanding officer, Col. Capper. It failed to fly but its derivatives, the D.7 and D.7bis, flew throughout 1911–1913. British-built examples were flown both at Sheppey and at Larkhill on Salisbury Plain, and one was also built by the Astra company in France.

Parallel with the monoplane work, the Dunne D.8 biplane was developed from the D.5. In 1913 an example was bought by Nieuport (who had taken over Astra's aeroplane business) and flown across the Channel to France. The next year a much reorganised Farnborough evaluated the type. Production was licensed to both Nieuport in France and Burgess in America, however only the Burgess-Dunne was manufactured in any quantity.

From 1913, Dunne's continuing ill health forced him to retire from active flying. The Blair Atholl Syndicate was taken over by armaments conglomerate Armstrong Whitworth and Dunne began work on a D.11. When war broke out in 1914, the project was abandoned and Dunne moved on to other work.

=== Later years ===
Dunne published his first book, on dry fly fishing, in 1924, with a new method of making realistic artificial flies.

Meanwhile, he was studying precognitive dreams which he believed he and others had experienced. By 1927 he had evolved the theory of serial time for which he would become famous and published an account of it, together with his dream researches, in his next book An Experiment with Time. In 1932 the Society for Psychical Research (SPR) tried to replicate his experimental results on dream precognition, but their investigator Theodore Besterman failed amid some controversy. The SPR's journal editor even prefaced his report with a disclaimer distancing the Society from his findings and Dunne gave his own version two years later in a new edition of his book.

When the playwright J. B. Priestley premiered his 1937 time play Time and the Conways, Dunne lectured the cast on his theory, reprinted in Nothing Dies. He later gave a television broadcast of the lecture with musical accompaniment in December 1937. Dunne continued to work on serialism throughout the rest of his life and wrote several more books, as well as frequent updates to An Experiment with Time.

=== Family life ===
On 3 July 1928, at the age of 52, he married the Hon. Cicely Twisleton-Wykeham-Fiennes, daughter of Geoffrey Cecil Twisleton-Wykeham-Fiennes, 18th Baron Saye and Sele, and they lived for a good deal of time after that at the family seat of Broughton Castle. They had two children and he wrote up some of his bedtime stories to them in two more books, The Jumping Lions of Borneo and St. George and the Witches (published in the US as An Experiment with St. George).

=== Death ===
Dunne died in Banbury, England, on 24 August 1949, aged 73.

== Aircraft ==
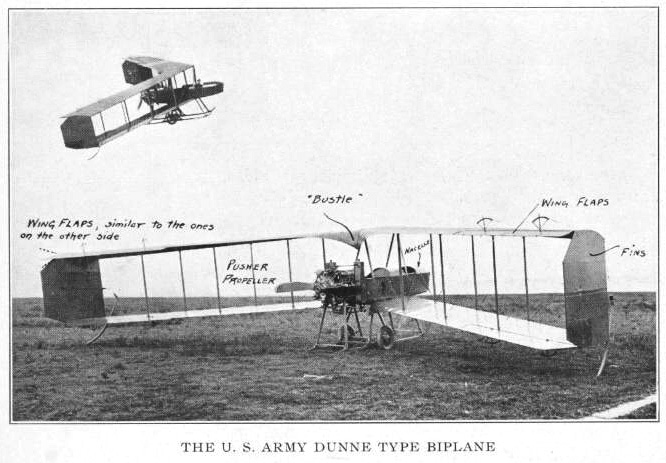
A Burgess-Dunne biplane in the US Army, c. 1917

Dunne created some of the first practical and stable aircraft. The majority were unusual in being of tailless swept configuration. Stability was achieved by progressively rolling the leading edge down from root to tip, a feature known as washout. Careful balance of its characteristics allowed the use of only two flight controls. A disadvantage of this was that, without a rudder, crosswind landings were not possible and the approach had to be made into the wind.

Aircraft designed by Dunne included:

- D.1, 1907. Biplane, flown first as a glider, then the powered version was damaged on its first takeoff attempt.
- D.2. Proposed small test glider for the Dunne-Huntington triplane, not built.
- Dunne-Huntington triplane, designed 1907–1908, flown 1910. Triple tandem wing with high-mounted central wing and smaller fore wing, leading some to refer to it as a biplane. Constructed by Professor A. K. Huntington to Dunne's design, the only type which was not of tailless swept configuration.
- D.3, 1908. Biplane glider, flew well.
- D.4, 1908. Powered biplane, achieved short hops.
- D.5, 1910. Powered biplane. First Dunne aeroplane to fly, first tailless aeroplane to fly, stable in flight. Following an accident it was rebuilt in modified form as the D.8.
- D.6, 1911. Monoplane, never flew.
- D.7, 1911. Monoplane, flew well. The D.7-bis was a Gnome-powered version of the D.7.
- D.8, 1912. Biplane, several built. The D.8-bis was a Gnome-powered version of the D.8; an example flew from Eastchurch to Paris in 1913.
- D.9, 1913. Unequal-span biplane or sesquiplane project, never completed.
- D.10, 1913. Shorter-span version of D.8. Proved a failure.
- Burgess-Dunne. License-built variants derived from the D.8 and manufactured under license in U.S. from 1913 to 1916; land- and seaplane versions; flew with U.S. and Canadian military air arms.

== Dry fly fishing ==
Dunne was a keen dry fly fisherman. At the time Halford's theories were fashionable and his flies commonplace, but Dunne noticed that they did not match the real flies he saw while fishing. He was one of the first writers to challenge the Halford school, developing new theories and a number of dry flies based on the translucence of a fly when seen from underneath in direct sunlight. In Dunne's flies the hooks were painted white to reflect light, bound in methodically coloured fibres and oiled to make the fibres more translucent.

He published his theories and fly dressings in a book, Sunshine and the Dry Fly, in 1924. The first part of the book is primarily a treatise on the vision of the trout and its response to various kinds of prey or lure. The second part comprises instructions for tying the flies which he had designed.

His work proved revolutionary, "amounting almost to heresy." Writers who have endorsed Dunne include Robert Hartman and Arthur Ransome. Flies to his pattern were still available from Hardy Bros. as late as 1966.

== Dreams and serialism ==
Dunne believed that he experienced precognitive dreams. The first he records occurred in 1898, in which he dreamed of the time on his watch before waking up and checking it. Several such experiences, some quite dramatic, led him to undertake a scientific investigation into the phenomenon. Based on years of experimentation with such precognitive dreams and hypnagogic states, both on himself and on others, he claimed that in such states, the mind was not shackled to the present and was able to perceive events in the past and future with equal facility. He used this to support his new theory of time and consciousness. His landmark An Experiment with Time (1927) recounts the story and also includes his account of the theory of serial time.

Dunne proposed that our experience of time as linear is an illusion brought about by human consciousness. He argued that past, present and future were continuous in a higher-dimensional reality and we only experience them sequentially because of our mental perception of them. He went further, proposing an infinite regress of higher time dimensions inhabited by the conscious observer, which he called "serial time."

In The Serial Universe (1934), The New Immortality (1938), Nothing Dies (1940) and Intrusions? (1955), he further elaborated on the concept of "serialism," examining its relation to current physics in relativity and quantum mechanics, and to psychology, parapsychology and Christian theology.

Dunne's theory offered a scientific explanation for ideas of consciousness being explored widely at the time. It became well known and was discussed by philosophers such as J. A. Gunn, C. D. Broad and M. F. Cleugh, and by the parapsychologist G. N. M. Tyrrell. While some accepted his dream observations and the general thrust of his arguments, the majority rejected his infinite regress as logically flawed.

The ideas underlying Serialism were, and continue to be, explored by many literary figures in works of both fiction and criticism, most notably in the time plays of J. B. Priestley.

== Published works ==
- Sunshine and the Dry Fly (1924)
- An Experiment with Time (1927)
- The Serial Universe (1934)
- The League of North-West Europe (1936)
- The Jumping Lions of Borneo (1937)
- The New Immortality (1938)
- An Experiment with St. George (1938), published in the US as St George and the Witches
- Nothing Dies (1940)
- Intrusions? (1955)
