= Counter-rotating propellers =

Propellers that rotate on opposite directions

Counter-rotating propellers

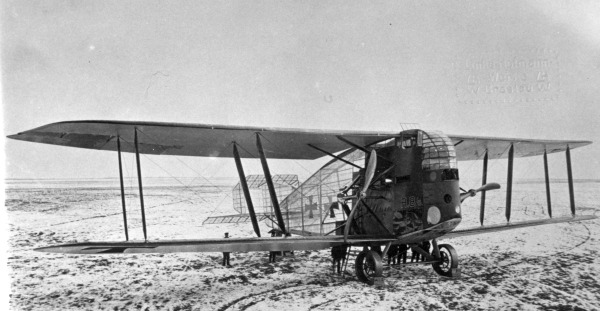
World War I Linke-Hofmann R.I German heavy bomber (1917) with counter-rotating propellers

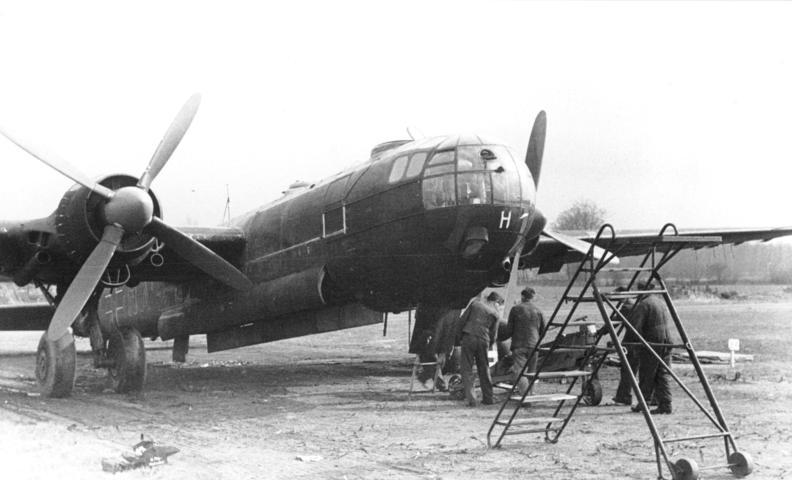
He 177A Greif with counter-rotating propellers

Counter-rotating propellers (CRP) are propellers which turn in opposite directions to each other. They are used on some twin- and multi-engine propeller-driven aircraft.

The propellers on most conventional twin-engined aircraft turn clockwise (as viewed from behind the engine). Counter-rotating propellers generally turn clockwise on the left engine and counterclockwise on the right. The advantage of such designs is that counter-rotating propellers balance the effects of torque and P-factor, meaning that such aircraft do not have a critical engine in the case of engine failure.

Drawbacks of counter-rotating propellers come from the fact that, in order to reverse the rotation of one propeller, either one propeller must have an additional reversing gearbox, or the engines themselves must be adapted to turn in opposite directions. (Meaning that there are essentially two engine designs, one with left-turning and the other with right-turning parts, which complicates manufacture and maintenance.)

== History ==
Counter-rotating propellers have been used since the earliest days of aviation, in order to avoid the aircraft tipping sideways from the torque reaction against propellers turning in a single direction. They were fitted to the very first controlled powered aeroplane, the Wright Flyer, and to other subsequent types such as the Dunne D.1 of 1907 and the more successful Dunne D.5 of 1910.

In designing the Lockheed P-38 Lightning, the decision was made to reverse the counter-rotation such that the tops of the propeller arcs move outwards (counterclockwise on the left and clockwise on the right), away from each other. Tests on the initial XP-38 prototype demonstrated greater accuracy in gunnery with the unusual configuration.

The counter-rotating powerplants of the German World War II Junkers Ju 288 prototype series (as the Bomber B contract winning design), the Gotha Go 244 light transport, Henschel Hs 129 ground attack aircraft, Heinkel He 177A heavy bomber and Messerschmitt Me 323 transport used the same rotational "sense" as the production P-38 did – this has also been done for the modern American Bell Boeing V-22 Osprey tiltrotor VTOL military aircraft design. The following German World War II aviation engines were designed as opposing-rotation pairs for counter-rotation needs:

- BMW 801A and B, and G/H subtypes
- Daimler-Benz DB 604
- Daimler-Benz DB 606
- Daimler-Benz DB 610
- Junkers Jumo 222

The aerodynamics of a propeller on one side of an aircraft change according to which way it turns, as it affects the P-factor. This can in turn affect performance under extreme conditions and therefore flight safety certification. Some modern types, such as the Airbus A400M, have counter-rotating propellers in order to meet air safety requirements under engine-out conditions.

== List of aircraft with counter-rotating propellers ==
Type	Country	Date	Notes
Airbus A400M Atlas	EU	2009	Four engines
Beechcraft 76 Duchess	US	1974	Twin engines
British Aerospace Jetstream 41	UK	1992	Twin engine
Cessna T303 Crusader	US	1978	Twin engines
de Havilland Hornet	UK	1944	Twin engines
Dunne D.1	UK	1907	Twin engines in fuselage on a common driveshaft
Dunne D.4	UK	1908	Single central engine
Dunne D.5	UK	1910	Single central engine
Fairey F.2	UK	1917	Twin engines
Gotha Go 244	Germany	1942	Twin engines
Heinkel He 177A Greif (fourth prototype onwards)	Germany	1940	Twin engines
Henschel Hs 129	Germany	1942	Twin engines
Junkers Ju 288	Germany	1940	Twin engines
Linke-Hofmann R.I	Germany	1917	Four engines in fuselage
Lockheed P-38 Lightning	US	1939	Twin engines
Messerschmitt Me 323 Gigant	Germany	1943	Six engines
North American P-82 Twin Mustang	US	1946	Twin engines
North American Rockwell OV-10 Bronco	US	1969	Twin engines
Piaggio P.180 Avanti	Italy	1986	Twin engines
Piper PA-31 Navajo (some variants)	US	1967	Twin engines
Piper PA-34 Seneca	US	1971	Twin engines
Piper PA-39 Twin Comanche C/R	US	1962	Twin engines
Piper PA-40 Arapaho	US	1973	Twin engines
Piper PA-44 Seminole	US	1978	Twin engines
Vought V-173 Flying Pancake	US	1942	Twin engines
Vought XF5U Flying Pancake	US	1947	Twin engines
Wright Flyer and most other Wright models to 1916	US	1903	Single central engine.

== See also ==
- Tiltrotor – Aircraft type
- Contra-rotating propellers – Two-propeller design for improving low-airspeed maneuverability
- Intermeshing rotors – Helicopter with two rotors turning in opposite directions
- Screw-propelled vehicle – Vehicle propelled by load-bearing rotating helical flanges
