= Dunne D.5 =

1910 experimental aircraft

D.5
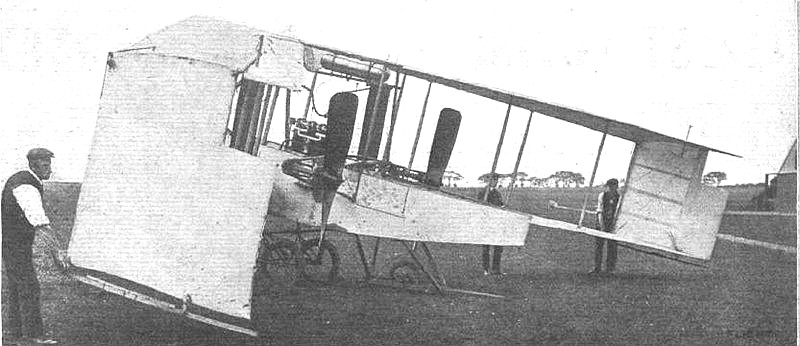

General information
- Type: Experimental aircraft
- Manufacturer: Short Brothers
- Designer: J. W. Dunne
- Number built: 1

History
- First flight: 1910
- Developed from: Dunne D.4
- Developed into: Dunne D.8

The Dunne D.5 was a British experimental aircraft built in 1910. A tailless swept-wing biplane, it was designed by J. W. Dunne and built by Short Brothers at Leysdown for his company, the Blair Atholl Aeroplane Syndicate Ltd. Like its military predecessors it was driven by twin pusher propellers, but it had a considerably more powerful engine.

The D.5 first flew in the summer of 1910, thus becoming his first powered aeroplane to fly. Dunne had long ago literally dreamed of this flight. The D.5 was later certified as the first fixed-wing aircraft ever to achieve natural stability in flight, with one of the official witnesses being Orville Wright.

== Design and development ==
On leaving the Army Balloon Factory at Farnborough in 1909, J. W. Dunne set up the Blair Atholl Aeroplane Syndicate Ltd., to continue developing his unusual tailless swept-wing aircraft, none of which had yet flown under power. The D.5 was his first design for them and it followed the general layout of the earlier D.4 Army machine in having a tailless, swept biplane wing with pronounced wash-out and endplates, and driven by twin pusher propellers. However it differed in having a streamlined central nacelle or fuselage housing the pilot and engine.

The control surfaces were, like the wing, similar to the D.4. Elevons on the upper wing tips were the only movable surfaces. However on the D.5 they were operated independently by two levers on either side of the cockpit. There was no rudder, with turning being coordinated by the aerodynamic design of the swept and washed-out wings. Unlike most aircraft, they were arranged such that raising an elevon both reduced lift and increased drag, while lowering it had the opposite effects. Thus, the wing being lowered would be dragged back (a phenomenon known as proverse yaw), automatically coordinating a banking turn.

Endplate fins were fitted to the wings to improve efficiency, with square cutouts to avoid fouling the elevons.

Construction of the main airframe was contracted to Short Brothers, who occupied sheds alongside the Syndicate's at the Aero Club of Great Britain's new flying ground at Shellbeach on the Isle of Sheppey.

The engine was a Green C.4 35 hp water-cooled, four-cylinder inline type, significantly more powerful than those the Army had allowed. Twin radiators were fitted on either side, standing up and aligned with the airflow in order to minimise drag. The mid-mounted engine chain-drove twin pusher propellers, mounted on outriggers behind the wing. As before, the propellers rotated in opposite directions to cancel out their torque.

Following construction at Leysdown, the D.5 was taken to Eastchurch, the new site of the (now Royal) Aero Club and the Syndicate located a short distance away on Sheppey. Early trials were not encouraging, with the machine in its original form proving too heavy. Dunne undertook extensive lightening to Short's construction.

== Operational history ==
The D.5 first flew in the summer of 1910. Dunne taxied it to the top of a rise in the ground which lay downwind, turned the machine and took off downhill into the wind. He later recalled in his book An Experiment with Time that, as a child, he had experienced exactly this flight in a dream.

The D.5 proved to be aerodynamically stable in flight. Two demonstration flights were made for the Royal Aero Club in December 1910, officially witnessed by the visiting Orville Wright and by Griffith Brewer. During the second flight, Dunne took his hands off the controls for an extended period, while he wrote a note on a piece of paper provided for him by Brewer. This note was the first ever documentary evidence of an aircraft's performance written in flight by the pilot himself. The D.5 was subsequently certified as the first fixed-wing aircraft ever to achieve stable flight.

The D.5 crashed whilst being flown by another pilot the following December, and parts of it were re-used to build the first D.8.

== Specifications ==
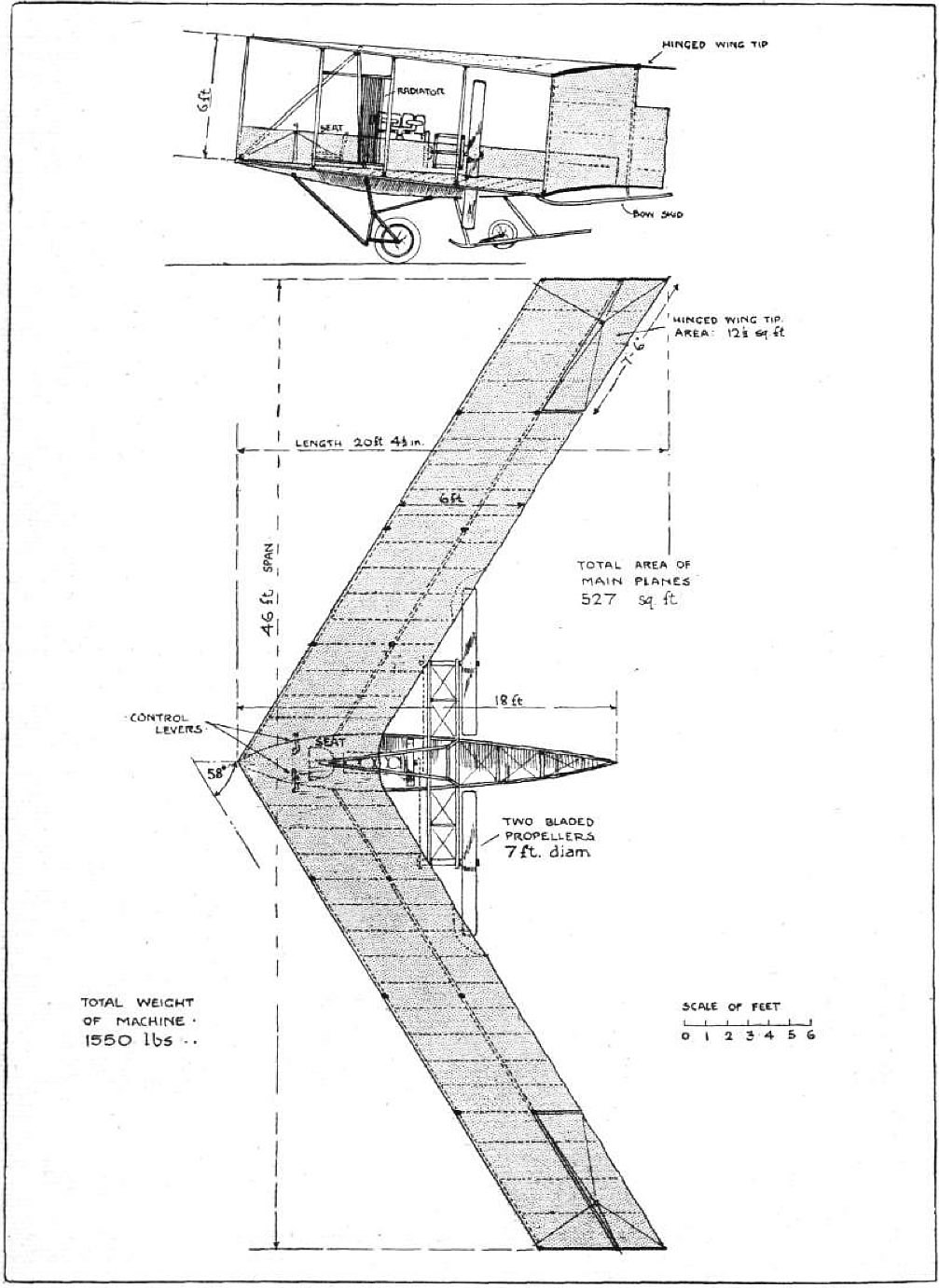
Dunne D.5

General characteristics

- Crew: One pilot
- Length: 20 ft 5 in (6.21 m)
- Wingspan: 46 ft 0 in (14.02 m)
- Height: 11 ft 6 in (3.51 m)
- Wing area: 527 sq ft (49.0 m^{2})
- Gross weight: 1,550 lb (703 kg)
- Powerplant: 1 × Green , 60 hp (45 kW)

Performance

- Maximum speed: 45 mph (72 km/h, 39 kn)
