= Dunne D.7 =

D.7

General information
- Type: Experimental inherently stable monoplane
- National origin: United Kingdom
- Manufacturer: The Blair Atholl Syndicate/ Short Brothers
- Designer: J. W. Dunne
- Number built: 1

History
- First flight: c. June 1911

The Dunne D.7 was one of J. W. Dunne's swept wing tailless aircraft designed to have automatic stability, first flying in 1911. It was a single seat, single engined pusher monoplane developed from the unsuccessful D.6.

== Design and development ==
Although J. W. Dunne is best known for his inherently stable tailless biplanes such as the D.8, he also developed a series of inherently stable monoplanes. He first submitted a monoplane design to the War Office when he joined the Army Balloon Factory at Farnborough in 1906, but they told him to build a biplane instead.

=== D.6 ===
It wasn't until Dunne left the Balloon Factory and started his own company, the Blair Atholl Aeroplane Syndicate Ltd., that a monoplane could be built. The D.6 was built by Dunne's old commanding officer, Col. J. E. Capper who was also a member of his Blair Atholl Aeroplane Syndicate. It was finished in 1911, with a 60 hp (45 kW) Green in a pusher configuration. Three A-frames supported the wing engine, pilot and undercarriage. The wing was straight edged, tapering from a central chord of 6 ft 3 in (1.91 m) to 5 ft 0 in (1.52 m) at the tips. The leading edge was swept at 35°. All Dunne's tailless aircraft had swept wings with marked washout (reduction of angle of incidence) at the tips. Since sweepback placed the tips well behind the centre of gravity, they provided longitudinal (pitch) stability in just the same way as a conventional tailplane, mounted at lower incidence than the wing. The wing camber increased outwards, causing the outer leading edge to droop further. The inherent design of the wing provided some directional (yaw) stability, which was augmented on the D.6 using down-turned wingtips. The wing had wingtip elevons for control, though because of the down-turned tips these also provided some rudder-like forces. The D.6 was tested at Larkhill on Salisbury Plain in January 1911 but failed to take off.

=== D.7 ===
The D.7, major parts of which were manufactured by Short Brothers, re-used the same wing but with a very different structure supporting it. The heavy A-frames were replaced with a pair of rectangular frames which extended above and below the wings, linked at the bottom by two transverse members. These frames served as double kingposts from which each wing was wire braced above and below. A substantial undercarriage structure was mounted at the bottom of the frames, comprising a long pair of skids which extended from the pusher propeller line well forward beyond the nacelle and curving strongly upwards. Each skid was multiply braced to its frame and inwards to the nacelle; the pair were joined by a cross strut near the forward tip. Both carried a pair of wheels and, at the rear, an articulated and sprung extension to absorb landing shocks.

The nacelle that carried the pilot's seat and the engine behind him was no more than an open wooden framework. Initially, the same Green engine was used as before, driving a two bladed, 7 ft 3 in (2.21 m) diameter propeller. A tall, rectangular radiator was placed longitudinally above the wing, positioned to raise the centre of gravity as high as possible. A pair of levers, one for each hand, controlled the aircraft.

The modified aircraft first appeared, not quite ready for flight and with a dummy engine, at the Olympia Aero Show in March 1911 where it was described as the "Dunne Auto Safety Aeroplane". It was on test at Eastchurch that June. and Dunne was pleased with the improved performance. It was tested at Eastchurch airfield on the Isle of Sheppey in June 1911, flown by Dunne.

The D.7 was subsequently modified with a 1 ft (305 mm) shorter span and a 50 hp (37 kW) 7-cylinder Gnome rotary engine. In January 1912 Dunne demonstrated the D.7 to members of the Royal Aeronautical Society, writing a note whilst flying hands off at 60 mph.

=== D.7 bis ===
The Dunne D.7 bis was an improved variant with a 70 hp (52 kW) Gnome rotary engine and capable of carrying a passenger. A joint venture between the syndicate and the French company Astra, it was built in France and successfully flown at Villacoublay by both Dunne and N.S. Percival in April 1913.

== Specifications (D.7) ==
Data from Flight, 1911

General characteristics

- Crew: 1
- Length: 21 ft 0 in (6.40 m)
- Wingspan: 36 ft 0 in (10.97 m)
- Wing area: 230 sq ft (21 m^{2}) including elevons
- Powerplant: 1 × Green water cooled inline, 60 hp (45 kW)
- Propellers: 2-bladed, 7 ft 3 in (2.21 m) diameter
