= Alan Douglas Carden =

Alan Douglas Carden, DSO (July 1874 – April 1964) was a British pioneer aviator and Colonel in the Royal Engineers. He gained his pilot's licence and served with the RFC in World War I, despite having only one hand.

== Family life ==
Alan Douglas Carden was born in St. Helier, Jersey, in July 1874, to Major-General George Carden of the 5th (Northumberland) Fusiliers and Mary Gertrude Blaine. He was the fifth son among eleven children. He was educated at Charterhouse.

On 2 January 1913 he married Elizabeth Nie Constance Mary, widow of Captain J. D. Dauncey of the Dorsetshire Regiment. She was the granddaughter of Ernest Curzon, 52nd Oxfordshire Light Infantry, son of the 1st Earl Howe. They had a daughter, Anne Crystal Brudenell Carden, born 7 July 1922. Nie died in May 1949.

== Royal Engineers ==
In December 1894, he joined the Royal Engineers. He initially specialised in submarine mining and electric lighting, rising to become C.O. of the West India Submarine Mining Company, R.E., in Jamaica.

In 1907, he returned to the UK and was appointed Assistant Superintendent of the Army Balloon Factory at Farnborough, under Col. John Capper, RE. Early on, he had a bad accident while visiting Salisbury Plain and lost the end of his left arm. Nevertheless, he continued to work on both the dirigible balloons or airships and heavier-than-air aeroplanes under development. These included the first Army airship, Nulli Secundus, the first UK-built aeroplane to fly, S.F. Cody's British Army Aeroplane No.1, and the tailless types designed by Lt. J. W. Dunne.

Following the termination of Dunne's work in 1909, Capt. Carden joined Dunne's Blair Atholl Aeroplane Syndicate and bought the first D.8 biplane so that he could learn to fly. The Dunne type was tailless and had only two controls, in the form of levers, each controlling an elevon on that side. Carden attached a ring prosthesis over the stump of his injured arm and found that he could operate the lever satisfactorily. In this way, he obtained his pilot's certificate to become one of the very few one-handed pilots ever to fly.

== Royal Flying Corps and WWI ==
The Air Battalion Royal Engineers was formed in 1911, with Carden appointed its Experimental Officer. Two years later, the battalion was dissolved and reformed as the Royal Flying Corps, and Carden rose to Squadron-Leader with the (initially temporary) rank of Major.

On the outbreak of war, he went to France and established the RFC's central aircraft park, including the Engine Repair Shop (ERS). In 1915, he joined the Egyptian Expeditionary Force and was subsequently awarded the DSO. By the end of hostilities, he had risen to the rank of Wing Commander/Lieut-Colonel.

== Later years ==
Carden retired from the Army in 1930. He presently returned to Farnborough, which was now the Royal Aircraft Establishment, and worked there until he was 80.

== Death ==
Carden died in Chippenham, Wiltshire, in April 1964, aged 90.
