= J. B. Priestley's Time Plays =

Dramas written by English author J. B. Priestley

The English author J. B. Priestley wrote a number of dramas during the 1930s and 40s, which have come to be known as his Time Plays. They are so called because each constructs its plot around a particular concept of time. In the plays, various theories of time become a central theatrical device of the play, the characters' lives being affected by how they react to the unusual temporal landscape they encounter.

The Time Plays comprise:

- Dangerous Corner (1932), in which exposure of a group of characters' dark secrets is wiped out when the play returns to the beginning at the fall of the curtain;
- Time and the Conways (1937), which explores J. W. Dunne's theory of simultaneous time expounded in the book An Experiment with Time;
- I Have Been Here Before, which is inspired by P. D. Ouspensky's theory of eternal recurrence from A New Model of the Universe;
- Johnson Over Jordan, in which a man encounters a series of trials in the afterlife;
- Music at Night, given a dreamlike setting outside of passing time (as in dreams).
- The Long Mirror, in which a woman artist has a curiously intimate relationship with a musician she has never met but has shared his life for five years in the spirit finally meet at a Welsh hotel;
- An Inspector Calls (USSR 1945, UK 1946), the most famous of them, where a family undergoes a police investigation into a suicide in which they are revealed to be progressively more entangled.

Of all the theories of time employed in the plays, Priestley professed to take only one seriously: that of J. W. Dunne as expounded in his book An Experiment with Time. However, his acceptance of the theory is qualified. Dunne's theory involved an infinite regress of time dimensions and levels of the self and Priestley rejected more than the first few time dimensions, which were sufficient to explain both the passage of time and precognition.
