= Dunne D.8 =

D.8
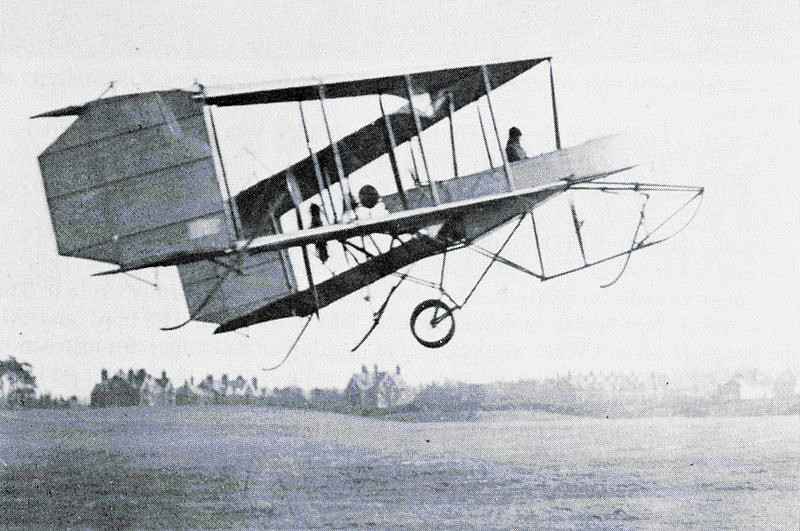
- Dunne D.8 at Farnborough, 11 March 1914

General information
- Type: Experimental aircraft
- National origin: United Kingdom
- Manufacturer: Blair-Atholl Syndicate Ltd, London
- Designer: J. W. Dunne
- Primary users: Capt. A. D. Carden Nieuport; United States Navy
- Number built: 4

History
- First flight: June 1912
- Developed from: Dunne D.5

The Dunne D.8 of 1912 was a tailless swept wing biplane, designed by J. W. Dunne to have inherent stability. One example was supplied to RAE Farnborough. License-built Burgess-Dunne models were used by the US Signal Corps and United States Navy and the short-lived Canadian Aviation Corps. It was the latter's first and only warplane.

== Design and development ==
J. W. Dunne's first swept biplane wing aircraft, designed to have automatic stability, dated from his employment at the Army Balloon Factory (later RAE Farnborough) during 1906–09. After leaving Farnborough, Dunne set up a private company, the Blair Atholl Aeroplane Syndicate Ltd. Its first aircraft was the Dunne D.5. When this crashed in 1911 it was rebuilt as the first D.8. The two models shared similar wings and the same engine, but the D.8 had a single pusher propeller instead of the chain-driven pair of the D.5. Their fuselages and undercarriages were also different.

The D.8 was a tailless four bay unstaggered biplane with constant chord wings swept at 32°. The wings were built up around two spruce spars, the forward one forming the leading edge. To help achieve stability the incidence and interplane gap decreased outboard, the former becoming negative. This washout on tips well behind the centre of gravity provided longitudinal stability in the same way as a conventional tailplane set at lower incidence than the wings. Camber increased outwards. Simple, near parallel, pairs of interplane struts joined the spars. Fixed side curtains between upper and lower wing tips helped to control sideways airflow and provided additional directional (yaw) stability. Wing tip elevons were used for control, operated by a pair of levers, one either side of the pilot. The D.8 initially used just one pair of elevons, mounted on the upper wing, a rectangular cutout in the side curtains allowing for their movement as on the D.5. Large parts of the aircraft were manufactured by Short Brothers.

The D.8's water-cooled 4-cylinder, 60 hp (45 kW) Green engine directly drove a single pusher propeller, saving weight compared with the D.5's chain drive. As a consequence of the propeller position the fuselage was shortened at the rear; it was also extended in the nose. This first D.8 was a single-seater like its D.5 predecessor, the pilot sitting at mid chord.

The undercarriage was complex, comprising a narrow-track pair of sprung wheels with wingtip skids. It featured undamped, opposing springing and an elaborate anti-noseover skid.

The Green engine was later replaced by an 80 hp (60 kW) 7-cylinder Gnome rotary engine. This engine also powered the second aircraft, which was a two-seater with the pilot placed just ahead of the wing leading edge and the passenger (who had dual control) at the trailing edge. There were now control surfaces on both upper and lower wings, the side curtains having the rear corners cut off at an angle to allow them to move. Each of the upper wings carried a pair of elevons, nearly doubling the control surface area.

== History ==
The maiden flight of the first D.8, fitted with a Green engine, took place at Eastchurch in June 1912. It was present at the Larkhill Military trial in August 1912, though it did not take part in the competition. Despite the two handed arrangement of the D.8's controls, the one-handed Capt. A. D. Carden gained his Royal Aero Club Aviator's Certificate on it in June 1912.

In 1913 the D.8 was fitted with an 80 hp Gnome engine which greatly improved performance and reliability. In August 1913 Commandant Felix piloted it across the English Channel from Eastchurch to Villacoublay, Paris. Nieuport had obtained a licence to build the D.8 and Felix gave a series of demonstration flights in France on their behalf.

A Nieuport-built Dunne appeared at the Paris Aero Salon in December 1913. Like the revised D.8 it was a Gnome powered two-seater, but it showed significant differences both aerodynamically and structurally. It combined the double upper wing elevons into a single surface and had very rounded rear wingtips. The fuselage was modified and built around steel tubes rather than wood. The interplane struts were streamlined steel tubes. It also had a simplified undercarriage.

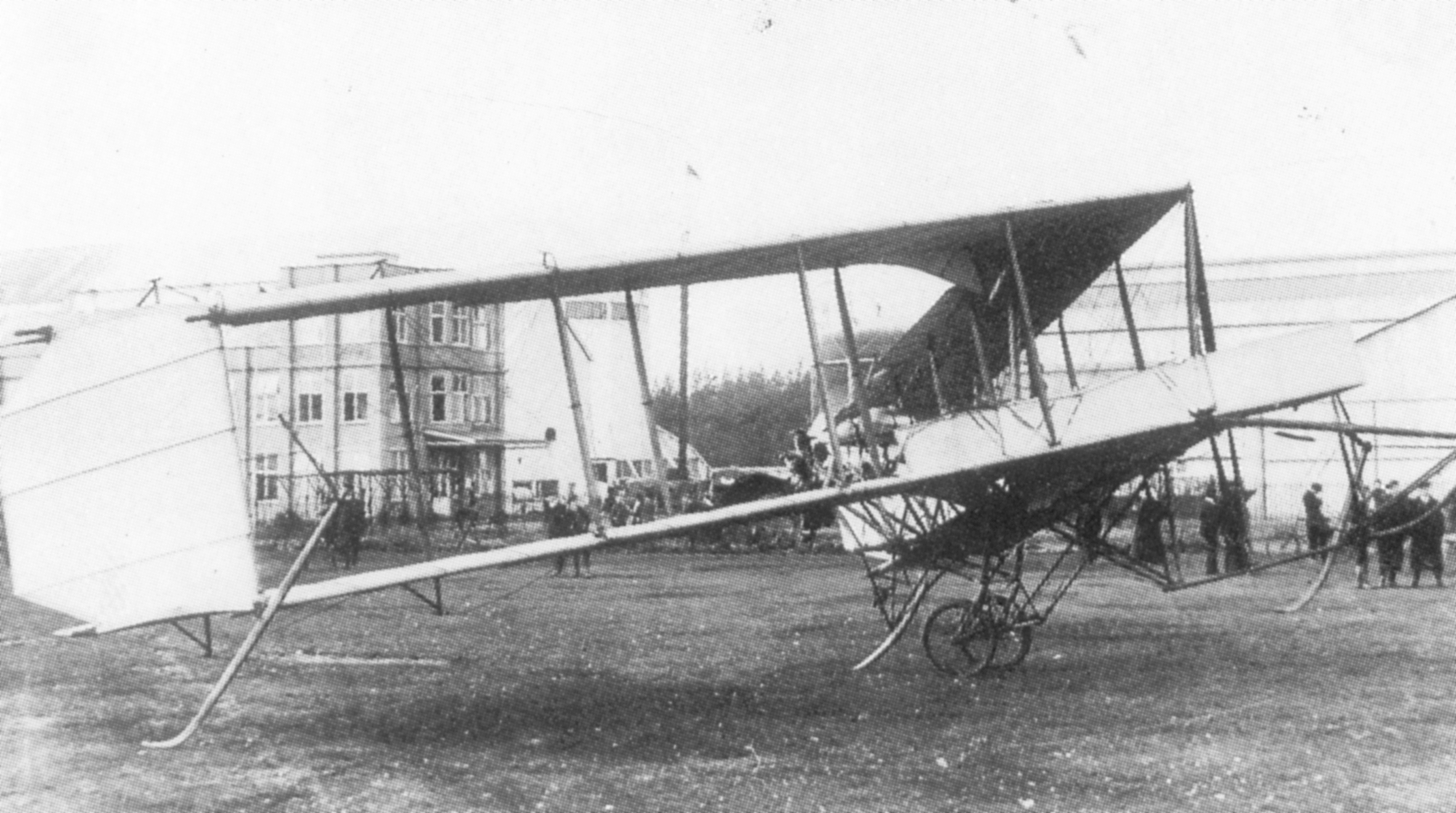
Dunne D.8 at Farnborough, 11 March 1914

Dunne obtained a War Office order for two D.8s, though one was cancelled because of late delivery. The other was delivered to Farnborough on 3 March 1914, where it was given the RFC number 366. It made several flights on 11 March piloted by N. S. Percival, who had flown the first D.8 many times at Eastchurch and was now an RFC officer. The general judgement was that in the search for balance between stability and controllability, the Dunne design overemphasised the former.

== Derived types ==
- Nieuport-Dunne Derived from the D.8 and built under license by the French Nieuport company and exhibited at the Paris Salon in 1913.
- Burgess-Dunne The Burgess Company based in Marblehead, Mass, USA gained the US manufacturing rights and built a series of aircraft derived from the D.8. They became known as Burgess-Dunne machines and were mostly single-float planes. The first flew in March 1914, piloted by Clifford Webster. Apart from wingtip floats the wings were identical to those of the D8, but the fuselage was revised with a distinct nacelle containing a more enclosed cockpit. The aircraft was a single-seater, with the heavier 100 hp (75 kW) Curtiss OXX2 water-cooled engine moved forwards, shortening the fuselage and with its radiator placed between engine and pilot. The single float was 17 ft 8 in (5.38 m) long, shallow and flat bottomed viewed from in front, with a single step. The prototype behaved well in the air and on the water. The second machine was very similar to the first, but room was made for a second seat by replacing the single fuselage mounted radiator with a pair fixed to the rear float struts.

The second machine was bought by the Canadian government for the Canadian Aviation Corps and was their first military aircraft. It was shipped to Europe on the SS Athenia for service in World War I, but was seriously damaged in transit and not used. The third machine, another two-seater but powered by a Salmson M-9 radial providing 135 hp (101 kW), was delivered to the US Signal Corps in either 1914 or 1915. Two were also delivered to the US Navy as type AH-7, fitted with a 90 hp (67 kW) Curtiss engine and AH-10 with the 100 hp Curtiss. The latter set a US altitude record of 10,000 fft (3,050 m) on 23 April 1915. One Burgess-Dunne was configured as a landplane for a time.

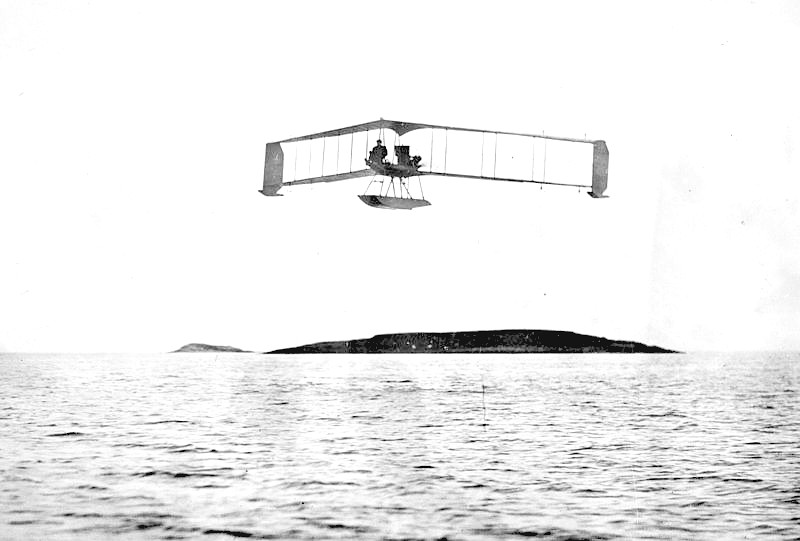
The first Burgess-Dunne floatplane at Marblehead in 1914

A US Navy Burgess-Dunne hydroplane about to the leave the water.

The Burgess-Dunne types were
- BDI - as the prototype.
- BD - as the second aircraft, first aimed at the military market then as a sports plane.
- BDH - a two-seater with a 140 hp (100 kW) Sturtevant V-8 engine and a slightly increased span (46 ft; 14 m).
- BDF - a three-seat, flying boat variant with the Curtiss engine but a span increased to 53 ft (16 m).
A full scale, non-flying replica of a Burgess-Dunne is displayed in the RCAF Memorial Museum, CFB Trenton, Ontario, largely built by Barry D. MacKeracher.

- D.10 A development built around 1912 with a modified wing, which proved a failure and was converted back to a D.8.

== Specifications (second aircraft) ==
Data from Bruce 1992

General characteristics

- Crew: 1
- Wingspan: 46 ft 0 in (14.02 m)
- Wing area: 545 sq ft (50.6 m^{2})
- Empty weight: 1,400 lb (635 kg)
- Gross weight: 1,900 lb (862 kg)
- Powerplant: 1 × Gnome 7-cylinder rotary, 80 hp (60 kW)

Performance

- Maximum speed: 56 mph (90 km/h, 49 kn)
- Rate of climb: 500 ft/min (2.5 m/s)

== See also ==
Related lists

- List of aircraft of the Royal Flying Corps
