= Music at Night =

Music at Night may refer to:

- Music at Night (book), a 1931 collection of essays by Aldous Huxley
- Music at Night (play), a 1938 play by J. B. Priestley
