= Polniak LP Dedal-2 =

1970s Polish human-powered aircraft

- Three-view of the Polniak LP Dedal-2

General information
- Type: Human-powered aircraft
- National origin: Polish
- Manufacturer: Leon Polniak
- Number built: 1

History
- Developed from: LP Dedal

The LP Dedal-2 human-powered aircraft was the project of Leon Polniak, a Franco-Polish engineer based in Kraków, Poland, and was a development of his earlier, unfinished, Dedal design. Dedal is Polish for Daedalus.

== Development ==
The craft was similar in appearance to its predecessor, though with numerous changes made to each of its components. It was a wire-braced, mid-wing monoplane and, as originally designed, was intended to have a tractor propeller. The fuselage was of the pod-and-boom type. The wing consisted of six panels, set with a slight forward-swept. All the wing panels were of constant chord, with the incidence and dihedral of the outermost panels being able to be varied. The pilot sat in a conventional cycling position, and using both arms and legs, powered the propeller via a belt drive.

The empennage consisted of a single-piece rudder and an all-flying elevator. The leading edge of the elevator was connected to the rear of the fuselage's boom, with the leading edge of the rudder being attached to the trailing edge of the elevator. There were no ailerons, with lateral control intended to be achieved by lateral movement of the pilot. The aircraft was primarily constructed from spruce and balsa. The undercarriage consisted of a single monowheel, made from balsa, fitted with a 12.50 cm (5 inch) pneumatic tyre. Stabilising outriggers were located at the rear of the fuselage and under each wing.

According to Mięśnioloty, the first taxiing trials took place in September 1975. Photographs of the completed machine, which appeared in the Polish media during the spring of 1976, showed that it had a pusher propeller, along with other modifications. No flight claims have been made for the Dedal-2.

== Specifications (LP Dedal-2) ==
Data from Jane's all the world's aircraft 1977-78

General characteristics

- Crew: 1
- Length: 9.20 m (30 ft 2 in)
- Wingspan: 23.00 m (75 ft 6 in)
- Height: 2.10 m (6 ft 11 in)
- Wing area: 40.00 m^{2} (430.6 sq ft)
- Aspect ratio: 12
- Airfoil: Eiffel 400
- Empty weight: 27 kg (60 lb)
- Max takeoff weight: 85 kg (187 lb)
- Powerplant: 1 × Cyclist
- Propellers: 2-bladed, 2.60 m (8 ft 6 in) diameter fixed pitch

Performance

- Cruise speed: 20.5 km/h (12.7 mph, 11.1 kn)
- Wing loading: 2.00 kg/m^{2} (0.41 lb/sq ft) including tailplane

== See also ==
- SUMPAC
- HMPAC Puffin
- Malliga 1
- Malliga 2
- Polniak LP Dedal
- List of human-powered aircraft
