= Dunne-Huntington triplane =

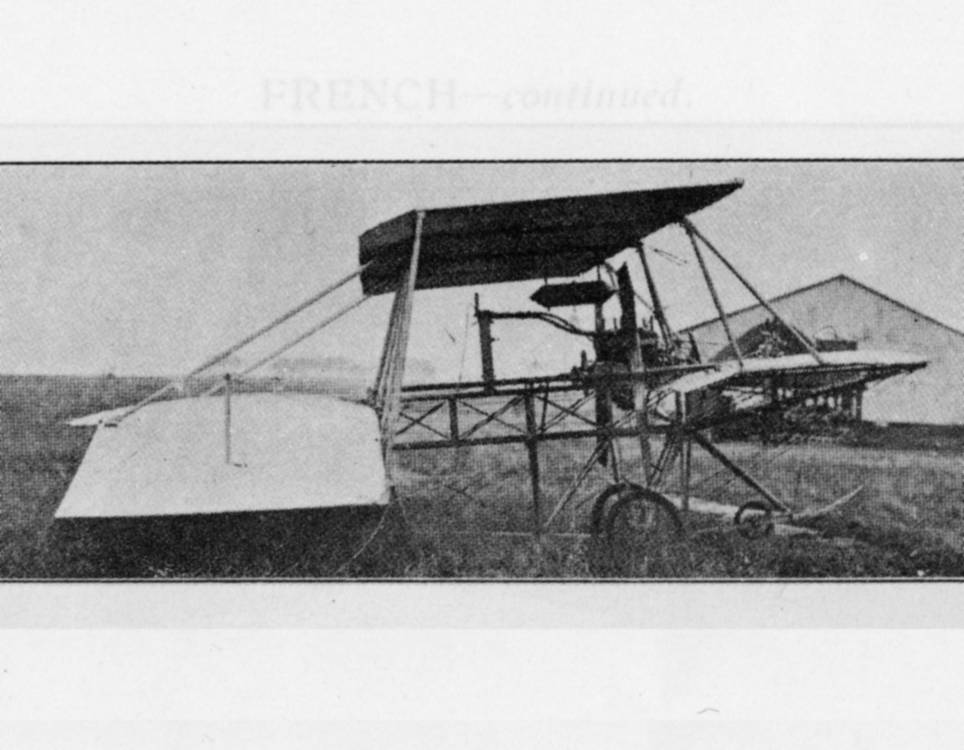
- With original Wolseley engine and twin propellers.

General information
- Type: Experimental prototype
- Manufacturer: A. K. Huntington
- Designer: J. W. Dunne
- Primary user: A. K. Huntington
- Number built: 1

History
- First flight: 1910
- Retired: 1914

The Dunne-Huntington triplane, sometimes referred to as a biplane, was a pioneer aircraft designed by J. W. Dunne and built by A. K. Huntington. It was of unusual staggered triple-tandem configuration and an early example of an inherently stable aeroplane, flying regularly between 1910 and 1914.

== History ==
While working for the Army at Farnborough in 1907, J. W. Dunne agreed to design a stable aeroplane for the civilian enthusiast and metallurgy professor A. K. Huntington. Forbidden to use his secret Army design, he based it on a previous idea for a heavily staggered tandem triplane that had been trialled by Hiram Maxim for a fairground attraction. In the winter of 1907–08 he drew up two designs. One was for a small-scale glider to test the idea, which he called the D.2. The other was for the full-sized powered aeroplane. In the event the glider was never built and Huntington began directly on the full-sized craft. He finished building it in 1910.

Huntington flew it at the Royal Aero Club grounds at Eastchurch, progressively modifying it to improve its flight characteristics between 1910 and 1914. By 1913 it had effectively become a joint design by Dunne and Huntington and was flying well.

== Description ==
The main feature of the design was a set of three wings, each of 10 ft (3.0 m) chord, placed immediately fore and aft of each other. The fore-wing was of reduced span and the middle wing raised to give the appearance of a heavily staggered canard biplane. The angle of incidence of each plane was adjusted to provide longitudinal stability.

The outer sections of the rear wing were given a sharp downward angle or anhedral. Triangular outboard control surfaces were hinged on the diagonal to these sections and provided all the functions normally produced by separate elevator, aileron and rudder controls. When operated together they acted as elevators, while when operating differentially they acted as combined ailerons and rudders to bank the aircraft into a controlled turn.

The front and rear wings were fixed to a long, uncovered fuselage frame, with the front wing gently tapered. The top wing was strut-braced to the structure below. Side curtains between the two full-span wings were initially fitted.

The pilot was seated above the front wing, with the engine immediately behind. Power was initially provided by a single Wolseley water-cooled inline engine chain-driving twin propellers. These were mounted in the space beneath the upper wing and their axles doubled as twin cylindrical booms connecting the fore and aft structures.

When first flown at Eastchurch in early 1910, the fuselage was originally mounted on an undercarriage comprising two main wheels, a large tail wheel and twin auxiliary skids under the nose.

Later modifications included removal of the side screens, structural lightening including a revised undercarriage and, in 1913, fitting of a more powerful 70 hp (52 kW) Gnome air-cooled rotary engine with single engine-mounted propeller. These enabled the craft to reach 43 mph (69 km/h; 37 kn).

== Specifications (Re-engined) ==
Data from Jane's (1909) except where specified. Note: Dimensions given are estimated.

General characteristics

- Crew: 1
- Length: 50 ft (15 m)
- Wingspan: 59 ft (18 m)
- Powerplant: 1 × Gnome Rotary, 70 hp (52 kW)

Performance

- Maximum speed: 43 mph (69 km/h, 37 kn)
