= Dunne D.1 =

D.1 and D.4

General information
- Type: Experimental aircraft
- Manufacturer: Army Balloon Factory
- Designer: J. W. Dunne
- Primary user: British Army
- Number built: 1

History
- First flight: July 1907

The Dunne D.1, was an experimental tailless aircraft built in the UK in 1907. It comprised a main unit which could be flown as a glider, to which a chassis unit with power train could be added. The glider achieved a short flight in 1907. The D.1 was later rebuilt as the powered D.4, which achieved short hops in 1908.

== Origins ==
Lieutenant J. W. Dunne was employed by the Army Balloon Factory at Farnborough in 1906, to develop full-size aircraft based on his previous work with tailless, swept-wing models which were inherently stable. The key feature which gave them stability was a conical upper wing surface, arranged to give a progressive decrease in the angle of incidence towards the wingtips, a feature known as washout.

Dunne and the Balloon Factory's Commander, Col. J.E. Capper, wanted him to build a monoplane, but the Army insisted on a biplane, believing it to be both lighter and stronger.

== Dunne D.1 ==
=== Design and construction ===
The first design to be built was the D.1, a biplane glider of wire-braced wooden construction and silk covering, to which could be added a powered chassis unit.

The glider was designated the D.1-A. Its undercarriage consisted of a pair of skids underneath the lower wing. Takeoff was achieved by launching the glider from a wheeled platform. The pilot's seat was placed centrally at the front, between the upper and lower planes.

The separate, wheeled chassis unit incorporated twin Buchet engines on a common driveshaft, each of nominally 12 hp (8.9 kW). Twin counter-rotating pusher propellers were then belt-driven from the single shaft. However the staff were not experienced with the engines and the arrangement typically delivered only around 15 hp (11 kW) of power. The War Office believed that an engine of any higher power would be "of no use to the British Army" and refused to fund one. When mounted on its chassis, the craft was designated the D.1-B.

Construction was carried out in the utmost secrecy, with different parts made in different workshops and brought together in a locked room for final assembly. The glider was finished in time for initial flight trials in 1907, while the chassis took longer to make and was taken to the trials site afterwards.

=== Flight trials ===
To maintain security for the flight trials, the craft was dismantled, taken to Blair Atholl in Scotland by a team of Royal Engineers in July 1907 and reassembled there.

Piloted by Col. Capper, on its first and only flight a gust of wind caused it to veer towards a wall running alongside the chosen flight path. Capper was unable to correct its path and it crashed into the wall, damaging the craft and lightly injuring him. The flight had taken just 8 seconds, however it had lasted long enough to demonstrated the automatic stability which was it chief design goal.

The gliding section was repaired on site and the powered chassis unit, now arrived from Farnborough, was fitted. A raised guide track was laid down, reminiscent of the system used by the Wright brothers for some of their early flights. During a test in October, the plane slipped sideways off the launching track and crashed down to the ground, severely damaging it while the pilot was unhurt. It was dismantled again and taken back to Farnborough.

== Dunne D.4 ==
Dunne was now allowed a slightly more powerful engine, a single 25 hp (19 kW) R.E.P. Over the winter of 1907-08 he produced an updated design with integral engine and undercarriage, designated D.4. The wing from the D.1 was repaired and modified with more conventional elevons, hinged parallel to the trailing edge. It was mounted directly to a new steel-frame chassis. The framework spanned between the left and right halves of the wing and projected forward. It was partly covered in fabric, forming a new wing centre section above and a shallow nacelle to house the pilot below. Vertical endplate fins were added between the ends of the biplane wings. The R.E.P. engine still drove a pair of pusher propellers.

In 1908, trials were again made at Blair Atholl, piloted by Lt Lancelot D.L Gibbs. While the smaller D.3 glider was being flown, a new take-off strip was prepared for the D.4. Subsequent attempts to fly the D.4 proved that engine power remained insufficient, however several short hops were achieved during November and December 1908.

== See also ==
Aircraft of comparable role, configuration, and era

- British Army Aeroplane No 1
- Etrich I
