= A. K. Huntington =

British professor of metallurgy and aviation pioneer

Prof. Alfred Kirby Huntington
- Born: 18 January 1852; Ipswich, Suffolk
- Died: 17 April 1920 (aged 68); London
- Education: Royal School of Mines
- Children: Ulick Hethersett Huntington
- Engineering career
- Discipline: Metallurgy
- Institutions: King’s College, University of London

Professor Alfred Kirby Huntington (1852–1920) was a British professor of metallurgy and aviation pioneer. He flew balloons and made and flew his own aeroplane.

== Early life ==
Alfred Kirby Huntington was born on 18 January 1852 in Ipswich, Suffolk to Francis Henry Huntington and Amelia Huntington (née Hemsworth). He had an elder brother, Francis D’Esterre Huntington, who was born in 1847 but died aged 10 in 1857.

== Professional life ==
Huntington was Professor of Metallurgy at King's College, University of London.

He was trained at the Royal School of Mines under Dr Percy, leaving it in 1877 as an Associate in Mining and Metallurgy, and proceeded to King's College, London, where he assisted Walter Noel Hartley in his researches on ultra-violet absorption spectra. He also assisted Sir William Siemens in his early experiments with the electric arc furnace. When a separate Department of Metallurgy was founded at King's College in 1879, Huntington was appointed to the chair.

He was associated with the Institute of Metals from its foundation, and took an active part in its proceedings down to the time of his death. He became a vice-president in 1910, and during the 1913–14 session occupied the presidential chair, being in office at the Ghent meeting, the first meeting of the institute to be held abroad. On 13th December 1916, he was among three members of the Institute of Metals (alongside Sir George Beilby and Thomas Turner) to propose the election of Georgina Elizabeth Kermode. Kermode became the first female member of the Institute of Metals.

During the First World War Huntington was heavily involved with work for the War Ministry in testing munitions, including testing fracturing of grenades.

He died on 17 April 1920 at his London residence, Buckingham Street, Strand, shortly after relinquishing the chair.

== Aeronautics ==
Huntington was a founder and active committee member of the Royal Aero Club.

He began as a keen balloonist and took part in the first Aero Club race, which took place at the Ranelagh Club on 7 July 1906. His balloon, Zenith, was one of the seven balloons to ascend that day, the first time in England that seven balloons had ascended from one spot. He also competed in the first Gordon-Bennett Cup race in 1906 along with the Hon. C. S. Rolls.

He moved on from balloons to build and fly his own aeroplane, to a design provided by J. W. Dunne. The Dunne-Huntington triplane was an unusual design, variously referred to as a triplane, a biplane or a tandem monoplane. Dunne produced the original design for Huntington during the winter of 1907–08. Huntington built it over the next two years and in April 1910 he flew it for the first time, on the Aero Club's flying ground at Eastchurch on the Isle of Sheppey in Kent. Huntington experimented with a number of improvements over the next few years, notably the substitution of a Gnome rotary engine, and it was still flying well into 1914.

Due to the First World War, the aeroplane was dismantled and the framework used to make a rose pergola at the back of Huntingdon's country house in Yelstead in Kent.

Huntington is named on the Memorial to the Home of Aviation at Eastchurch.

== Works ==
=== Books ===
- Metals: Their Properties and Treatment, by Charles Loudon Bloxam. Partially rewritten and augmented by Alfred K. Huntington. London, Longmans, Green, and Co., 1888.
- Metals: Their Properties and Treatment (Bloxam) (1894 revision, by Charles Loudon Bloxam)
- Metals: Their Properties and Treatment (Huntington) (1904, with Walter George McMillan)

=== Articles ===
- "Progress in the Manufacture of Steel", Popular Science Monthly, 19 October 1881

=== Lectures ===
- Steel, its Composition and Properties (1881)
