= Jessie Rooke =

Australian suffragist

Jessie Spink Rooke
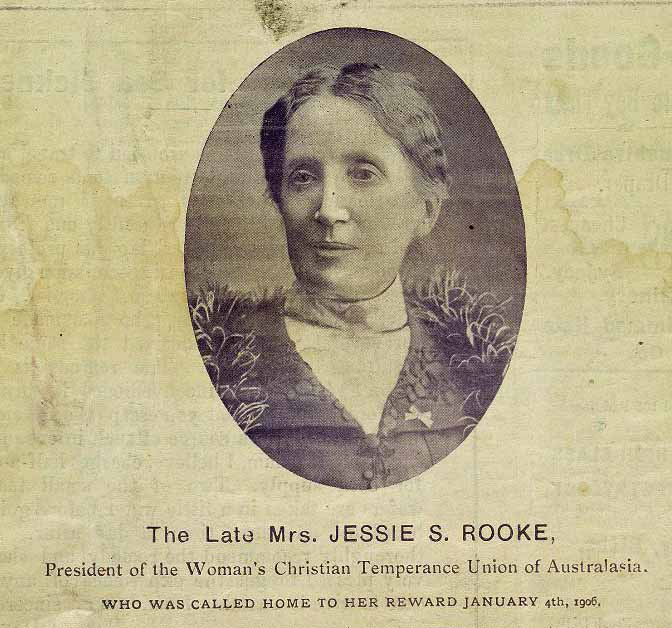
- Born: 10 September 1845; London, United Kingdom of Great Britain and Ireland
- Died: 4 January 1906 (aged 60); Burnie, Tasmania, Australia
- Occupations: suffragette, temperance reformer
- Spouses: Peter Charles Reid (m. 1924, died) Charles Rooke (m. 1883)

Jessie Spink Rooke (10 September 1845 – 4 January 1906) was a suffragette and temperance reformer in Tasmania, Australia, and one of the first Tasmanian women to gain recognition outside Tasmania.

== Life ==
Jessie Rooke was born in London on September 10, 1845, to William Walker and Catherine Scollay. Rooke moved to Melbourne, and in 1867, she married New Zealander Peter Charles Reid. After he died, she married widower Charles Rooke on August 14, 1883. The Rookes moved to Tasmania in the early 1890s, and Jessie Rooke became involved with the Burnie Woman's Christian Temperance Union (WCTU). She was elected president in 1894.

The WCTU emerged as leaders of the Tasmanian suffrage campaign. In 1896 Rooke toured Tasmania with suffrage superintendent Georgina Kermode. They arranged public meetings of women, collecting campaign funds, distributing pamphlets, and collecting signatures on a petition calling for the vote to be extended to women. The petition was presented to the Tasmanian parliament at the end of 1896. In 1898 Rooke toured Tasmania again with South Australian Elizabeth Nicholls. They visited 30 towns collecting signatures on a petition. Although suffrage bills were defeated in both 1896 and 1897, the Electoral Act of 1903 granted Tasmanian women the right to vote.

In 1898, Rooke became president of the Tasmanian WCTU branch, and in 1903, president of the Australian WCTU.

Rooke was a delegate to the 1902 International Council of Women Conference in Washington, and, in 1903, she founded the Tasmanian Women's Suffrage Association, which mobilized women for the next election.

Rooke remained president of the WCTU until her death in 1906 from congestive heart failure.
