= Polniak LP Dedal =

1970s Polish human-powered aircraft

- Three-view of the Polniak LP Dedal

General information
- Type: Human-powered aircraft
- National origin: Polish
- Manufacturer: Leon Polniak
- Number built: 1

History
- Developed into: LP Dedal-2

The LP Dedal human-powered aircraft was the project of Leon Polniak, a Franco-Polish engineer based in Kraków, Poland. Dedal is Polish for Daedalus.

== Development ==
Inspired by the Kremer prize, Polniak began the design of the aircraft in 1966, and construction commenced in 1967. Construction reportedly involved 6,000 hours.

The Dedal was a wire-braced parasol-wing monoplane of conventional configuration, and fitted with a tractor propeller. The fuselage was of the pod-and-boom type. The wing planform was located immediately above the fuselage, attached by a single pylon. The wing consisted of six panels, all of constant chord, with the two outermost panels set at a substantial dihedral angle. The pilot sat in a conventional cycling position, and powered the tractor propeller via a belt drive. The aircraft was primarily constructed from pine and balsa.

The aircraft was due to fly in 1972 but, according to Jane's all the world's aircraft 1973-74, when it was 50% complete, it was damaged while being transported, with Polniak then deciding to build an improved version, the LP Dedal-2.

== Specifications (LP Dedal) ==
Data from Jane's all the world's aircraft 1972-73, and Mięśnioloty

General characteristics

- Crew: 1
- Length: 7.20 m (23 ft 7 in)
- Wingspan: 25.00 m (82 ft 0 in)
- Height: 3.40 m (11 ft 2 in)
- Wing area: 43.80 m^{2} (471.5 sq ft)
- Aspect ratio: 14.3
- Airfoil: Eiffel 400
- Empty weight: 20 kg (44 lb)
- Gross weight: 125 kg (276 lb)
- Max takeoff weight: 105 kg (231 lb)
- Powerplant: 1 × Cyclist , 0.22–0.30 kW (0.30–0.40 hp)
- Propellers: 2-bladed, 2.70 m (8 ft 10 in) diameter fixed pitch

Performance

- Cruise speed: 25 km/h (16 mph, 13 kn)
- Wing loading: 2.40 kg/m^{2} (0.49 lb/sq ft)

== See also ==
- SUMPAC
- HMPAC Puffin
- Malliga 1
- Malliga 2
- Polniak LP Dedal-2
- List of human-powered aircraft
