= Tailless aircraft =

Aircraft whose only horizontal aerodynamic surface is its main wing

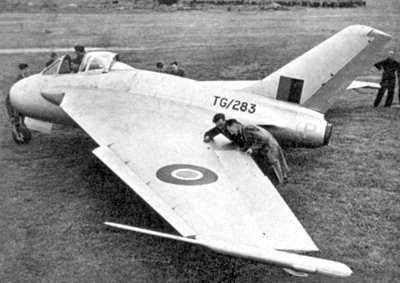
The DH108 Swallow

In aeronautics, a tailless aircraft is a fixed-wing aircraft with no other horizontal aerodynamic surface besides its main wing. It may still have a fuselage, vertical tail fin (vertical stabilizer), and/or vertical rudder.

Theoretical advantages of the tailless configuration include low parasitic drag as on the Horten H.IV soaring glider and good stealth characteristics as on the Northrop B-2 Spirit bomber. Disadvantages include a potential sensitivity to trim.

Tailless aircraft have been flown since the pioneer days; the first stable aeroplane to fly was the tailless Dunne D.5, in 1910. The most successful tailless configuration has been the tailless delta, especially for combat aircraft, while the Concorde airliner is also a delta configuration.

NASA has used the 'tailless' description for the novel X-36 research aircraft which has a canard foreplane but no vertical fin.

== Aircraft configuration ==
A tailless aircraft has no other horizontal surface besides its main wing. The aerodynamic control and stabilisation functions in both pitch and roll are incorporated into the main wing. A tailless type may still have a conventional fuselage, vertical tail fin (vertical stabilizer), and/or rudder.

=== Flying wing ===
A flying wing is a tailless design which also lacks a distinct fuselage, having the pilot, engines, etc. located wholly or partially in the wing.

== Aerodynamics ==
=== Drag ===
A conventional fixed-wing aircraft has a horizontal stabilizer surface separate from its main wing. This extra surface causes additional drag requiring a more powerful engine, especially at high speeds. If longitudinal (pitch) stability and control can be achieved by some other method (see below), the stabiliser can be removed and the drag reduced.

=== Longitudinal stability ===
A tailless aeroplane has no separate horizontal stabilizer. Because of this the aerodynamic center of an ordinary wing would lie ahead of the aircraft's center of gravity, creating instability in pitch. Some other method must be used to move the aerodynamic center backward and make the aircraft stable. There are two main ways for the designer to achieve this, the first being developed by the pioneer aviator J. W. Dunne.

Sweeping the wing leading edge back, either as a swept wing or delta wing, and reducing the angle of incidence of the outer wing section allows the outer wing to act like a conventional tailplane stabiliser. If this is done progressively along the span of the outer section, it is called tip washout. Dunne achieved it by giving the wing upper surface a conical curvature. In level flight the aircraft should be trimmed so that the tips do not contribute any lift: they may even need to provide a small downthrust. This reduces the overall efficiency of the wing, but for many designs – especially for high speeds – this is outweighed by the reductions in drag, weight and cost over a conventional stabiliser. The long wing span also reduces manoeuvrability, and for this reason Dunne's design was rejected by the British Army.

An alternative is the use of low or null pitching moment airfoils, seen for example in the Horten series of sailplanes and fighters. These use an unusual wing aerofoil section with reflex or reverse camber on the rear or all of the wing. With reflex camber the flatter side of the wing is on top, and the strongly curved side is on the bottom, so the front section presents a high angle of attack while the back section is more horizontal and contributes no lift, so acting like a tailplane or the washed-out tips of a swept wing. Reflex camber can be simulated by fitting large elevators to a conventional airfoil and trimming them noticeably upwards; the center of gravity must also be moved forward of the usual position. Due to the Bernoulli effect, reflex camber tends to create a small downthrust, so the angle of attack of the wing is increased to compensate. This in turn creates additional drag. This method allows a wider choice of wing planform than sweepback and washout, and designs have included straight and even circular (Arup) wings. But the drag inherent in a high angle of attack is generally regarded as making the design inefficient, and only a few production types, such as the Fauvel and Marske Aircraft series of sailplanes, have used it.

A simpler approach is to overcome the instability by locating the main weight of the aircraft a significant distance below the wing, so that gravity will tend to maintain the aircraft in a horizontal attitude and so counteract any aerodynamic instability, as in the paraglider. However, in practice this is seldom sufficient to provide stability on its own, and typically is augmented by the aerodynamic techniques described. A classic example is the Rogallo wing hang glider, which uses the same sweepback, washout and conical surface as Dunne.

Stability can also be provided artificially. There is a trade-off between stability and maneuverability. A high level of maneuverability requires a low level of stability. Some modern hi-tech combat aircraft are aerodynamically unstable in pitch and rely on fly-by-wire computer control to provide stability. The Northrop Grumman B-2 Spirit flying wing is an example.

=== Pitch control ===
Many early designs failed to provide effective pitch control to compensate for the missing stabiliser. Some examples were stable but their height could only be controlled using engine power. Others could pitch up or down sharply and uncontrollably if they were not carefully handled. These gave tailless designs a reputation for instability. It was not until the later success of the tailless delta configuration in the jet age that this reputation was widely accepted to be undeserved.

The solution usually adopted is to provide large elevator and/or elevon surfaces on the wing trailing edge. Unless the wing is highly swept, these must generate large control forces, as their distance from the aerodynamic center is small and the moments less. Thus a tailless type may experience higher drag during pitching manoeuvres than its conventional equivalent. In a highly swept delta wing the distance between trailing edge and aerodynamic centre is larger so enlarged surfaces are not required. The Dassault Mirage tailless delta series and its derivatives were among the most widely used combat jets. However even in the Mirage, pitch control at the high angles of attack experienced during takeoff and landing could be problematic and some later derivatives featured additional canard surfaces.

=== Yaw stability ===
A conventional aeroplane is unstable in yaw and needs a tail fin to keep it straight. Movement of the ailerons creates an adverse yaw pulling it out of the turn, which also has to be compensated by the rudder. While a swept wing is stable in straight flight, it still experiences adverse yaw during a turn. One solution is to give the wing sufficient twist for the outer section to angle downwards and give negative lift. This reverses the adverse yaw action of the ailerons, helping the plane into the turn and eliminating the need for a vertical rudder or differential-drag spoilers.

The bell-shaped lift distribution this produces has also been shown to minimise the induced drag for a given weight (compared to the elliptical distribution, which minimises it for a given span).

== History ==
See also History of the flying wing

=== J. W. Dunne ===
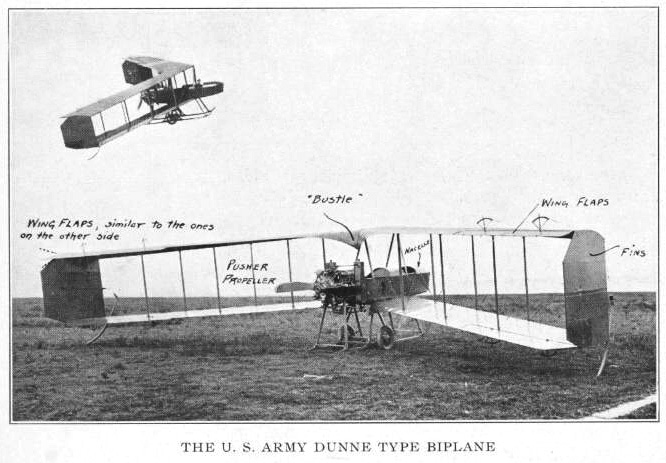
A Burgess-Dunne biplane in the US Army, 1917

Between 1905 and 1913, British Army Officer and aeronaut J. W. Dunne developed a series of tailless aircraft intended to be inherently stable and unstallable. Inspired by his studies of seagulls in flight, they were characterised by swept wings with a conical upper surface. The cone was arranged so that the wing twisted progressively outwards towards the tips, creating overall stability in both pitch and yaw. Under some flight conditions this even created negative incidence, and hence negative lift, in the outboard sections. A single control surface on the trailing edge of each wing tip acted as combined aileron and elevator. Dunne had an advanced qualitative appreciation of the aerodynamic principles involved, even understanding how negative lift at the wing tips, combined with steep downward-angled anhedral, enhanced directional stability.

Although originally conceived as a monoplane, Dunne's initial designs for the Army were required to be biplanes, typically featuring a fuselage nacelle between the planes with rear-mounted pusher propeller and fixed endplate fins between each pair of wing tips.

After his Army work had ended, in 1910 the D.5 biplane was witnessed in stable flight by Orville Wright and Griffith Brewer, who submitted an official report to the Royal Aeronautical Society to that effect. It thus became the first aeroplane ever to achieve natural stability in flight, as well as the first practical tailless aeroplane. The later D.8 was license-built and sold commercially by W. Starling Burgess in America as the Burgess-Dunne.

He also returned to his monoplane. The D.6 of 1911 was a pusher type high-wing monoplane which also featured pronounced anhedral or droop to the wing tips. The control surfaces now also acted as rudders.

Many of Dunne's ideas on stability remain valid, and many later designers such as G. T. R. Hill, Alexander Lippisch and John K. Northrop were inspired by his successes.

=== Inter-war and WWII ===
G.T.R. Hill and the Pterodactyls

After WWI, pilot Geoffrey T. R. Hill also sought a stable, unstallable design. Dunne gave some help initially and Hill went on to produce the Pterodactyl series of tailless aircraft from the 1920s onwards. Hill also began to develop the theory of the intrinsically stable aerofoil and incorporated it into his designs.

Lippisch deltas and the Messerschmitt Me 163 Komet

German theorists further developed the theory of the stable aerofoil. The designer Alexander Lippisch produced his first tailless design, the Delta I, in 1931. He went on to build a series of ever-more sophisticated designs, and at the end of the Second World War was taken to America to continue his work.

During the Second World War, Lippisch worked for the German designer Willy Messerschmitt on the first tailless aircraft to go into production, the Me 163 Komet. It was the only rocket-powered interceptor ever to be placed in front-line service, and was the fastest aircraft to reach operational service during the war.

Horten brothers

In the 1930s, Walter and Reimar Horten started to build simple tailless gliders, the first of which flew in 1933. The Hortens designed the world's first jet-powered flying wing, the Horten Ho 229

Northrop

In parallel with Lippisch, in the US, Jack Northrop was developing his own ideas on tailless designs. The N-1M flew in 1941 and a succession of tailless types followed, some of them true flying wings.

=== Postwar ===
de Havilland DH 108 Swallow

In the 1940s, the British aircraft designer John Carver Meadows Frost developed the tailless jet-powered research aircraft called the de Havilland DH.108 Swallow, built using the forward fuselage of the de Havilland Vampire jet fighter. One of these was possibly one of the first aircraft ever to break the sound barrier – it did so during a shallow dive, and the sonic boom was heard by several witnesses. All three built were lost in fatal crashes.

FMA I.Ae 38

The DINFIA IA 38 was a 1960s Argentine four-engine experimental tailless transport aircraft, designed under the direction of Reimar Horten and based on the German Horten H.VIII project and built by the DINFIA.

Northrop X-4 Bantam

Similar to the DH.108, the twin-jet powered 1948-vintage Northrop X-4 was one of the series of postwar X-planes experimental aircraft developed in the United States after World War II to fly in research programs exploring the challenges of high-speed transonic flight and beyond. It had aerodynamic problems similar to those of the DH.108, but both X-4 examples built survived their flight test programs without serious incidents through some 80 total research flights from 1950 to 1953, only reaching top speeds of 640 mph (1,035 km/h).

Dassault Mirage

The French Mirage series of supersonic jet fighters were an example of the tailless delta configuration, and became one of the most widely produced of all Western jet aircraft. By contrast the Soviet Union's equivalent widely produced delta-winged fighter, the Mikoyan-Gurevich MiG-21, does have a tail stabiliser.

Convair F2Y Sea Dart

In the 1950s, the Convair F2Y Sea Dart prototype became the only seaplane to exceed the speed of sound. Convair built several other successful tailless delta types.

Supersonic airliners

The Anglo-French Concorde Supersonic transport, and its Soviet counterpart, the Tupolev Tu-144, were tailless supersonic jet airliners, with ogival delta wings. The grace and beauty of these aircraft in flight were often remarked upon.

Lockheed SR-71 Blackbird

The American Lockheed SR-71 Blackbird strategic reconnaissance aircraft is the fastest crewed jet powered aircraft, achieving speeds above Mach 3.

NASA PRANDTL-D

The NASA Preliminary Research Aerodynamic Design To Lower Drag (PRANDTL-D) wing has been developed by Al Bowers at the NASA Armstrong Flight Research Center. Bowers was inspired by the work of Ludwig Prandtl and, like Dunne, by watching bird flight. As with the Dunne design, it has a wing twist sufficient to set the wing tips at a negative angle and create the same positive roll-yaw coupling. Bowers developed a quantitative analysis of the lifting characteristics, leading to his more general discovery of a bell-shaped lift distribution which minimises induced drag for the aircraft weight. He applied this distribution in the "Prandtl-D" series of designs. By the end of 2017, he had flown three such research models.

== See also ==
- Movement of center of pressure
- Longitudinal static stability
- Lifting body
- Flying wing
- List of tailless aircraft
