= George Beilby =

British chemist

Sir George Thomas Beilby
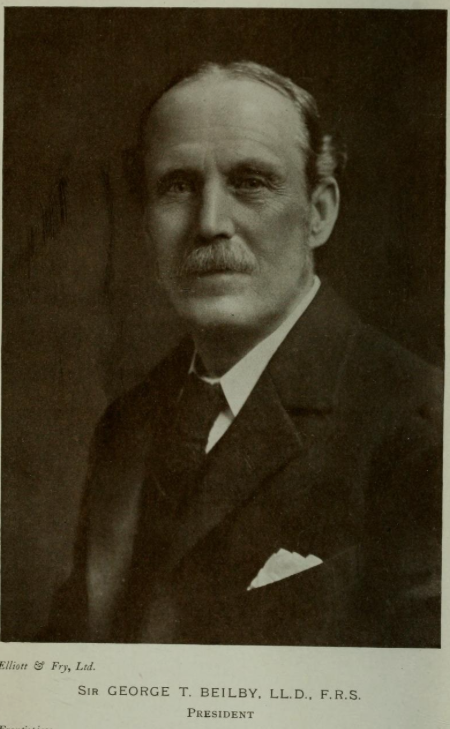
- George Thomas Beilby
- Born: 17 November 1850; Edinburgh, Scotland
- Died: 1 August 1924 (aged 73)
- Known for: hydrogen cyanide
- Scientific career
- Fields: chemistry

Sir George Thomas Beilby FRS (17 November 1850 – 1 August 1924) was a British chemist.

== Early life and education ==
He was born in Edinburgh, the son of a doctor and educated at Edinburgh Academy and Edinburgh University.

== Career ==
In 1869, he joined the Oakbank Oil Company to work in the oil shale industry where he and colleague William Young were able to increase the yield of oil, ammonia, and other useful materials from the shale by retorting and fractional distillation improvements. Their Young and Beilby patent retort was patented in 1882.

In 1892, Beilby patented a production method for hydrogen cyanide. This new method used ammonia and coal as starting materials and was able to meet the rising demands on sodium cyanide for the gold leaching by the MacArthur-Forrest process. He became director of the profitable Cassel Cyanide Company and then became a director of the Castner-Kellner Company at Runcorn, for whom he developed their new Wallsend factory.

On 13 December 1916, he was among three members of the Institute of Metals (alongside Thomas Turner and Professor Alfred Kirby Huntington) to propose the election of Georgina Elizabeth Kermode. Kermode became the first female member of the Institute of Metals.

== Organisational affiliations and honours ==
He was elected a Fellow of the Royal Society in May 1906. His candidacy citation read:

Ex-President, Society of Chemical Industry. Scientific Director of Chemical Works in Great Britain, Germany and America. Inventor of Processes for the manufacture of cyanides, ammonia, fuel gas and paraffin oils, which have had an important influence on these industries. Is recognised as an authority on the industrial use of fuel. Has made a special microscopic study of metals and other solids, discovering certain new relations between the crystalline and amorphous states and connecting with these states the widely different properties of metals in their hard and soft conditions. Scientific papers: - 'The Specific Gravity of Paraffin solid, fused, and in solution (Journ Chem Soc, 1883); 'The Nitrogen of Crude Petroleums and Paraffin Oils' (Journ Soc Chem Ind, 1891); 'The Action of Ammonia on Metals at High Temperatures' with Prof G G Henderson (Journ Chem Soc, 1901); 'The Minute Structure of Metals' (Brit Assoc Report, 1901); 'Surface Flow in Crystalline Solids,' and 'The Effects of Heat and of Solvents on Thin Films of Metal' (Roy Soc Proc, vol lxxii, 1903); 'Granular and Spicular Structure in Solids,' and 'The Intensification of Chemical Action by the Emanations from Gold and Platinum' (Brit Assoc Report, 1903); 'The Surface Structure of Solids' (Hurter Lecture, 1903); 'The Hard and Soft States in Metals' (Phil Mag, August 1904); 'The Action of certain Gases on Glass in the Neighbourhood of Hot Metals,' and 'The Relations between the Crystalline and Amorphous States as disclosed by the Surface Flow of Solids' (Brit Assoc Report, 1904); Technical papers: - 'Production of Ammonia from Minerals' (SCTJ, 1884 and Journ Soc Arts, 1885); 'New Form of Gas Thermometer' (ibid, 1895); ' new System of Cooling Oils for the Extraction of Paraffin' (ibid, 1885); 'The Waste Gases from Oil Stills' with J B McArthur (ibid, 1887); 'Thirty Years of Progress in the Shale Oil Industry' (ibid, 1897); 'Review of the Coal Consumption of the United Kingdom' (ibid, 1899), since brought up to 1904 at the request of the Royal Commission on Coal Supplies; 'The Position of the Cyanide Industry' (International Congress on Applied Chemistry, Berlin, 1903)

He was president of the Society of Chemical Industry from 1898-9, of the chemical section of the British Association in 1905, of the Institute of Chemistry in 1909–12, and of the Institute of Metals in 1916–8. In 1912 he was a member of the Royal Commission on Fuel and Engines for the Navy. During World War I, he was a member of the Admiralty Board of Invention and Research. He joined the Society for Psychical Research in 1914. He was knighted in the 1916 Birthday Honours.

== Personal life and death ==
In 1877, he married Emma Clarke Newnham, usually referred to as Lady Bielby, who was a great supporter of women's organisations, particularly in practical ways behind the scenes. They had a son Hubert and a daughter, Winifred Moller Beilby (1885-1936) who worked with, published with and in 1908 married chemist Frederick Soddy. Beilby supported some of his son in law's research work at the University of Glasgow.

He died in Hampstead, London, in 1924.

== Commemoration ==
The Beilby Medal and Prize is named in his honour. It is awarded in rotation by the Institute of Materials, Minerals and Mining, the Royal Society of Chemistry and the Society of Chemical Industry.
