= Time and the Conways =

Play by J. B. Priestley

U.S. First edition Harper & Brothers, New York, 1938

Time and the Conways is a British play written by J. B. Priestley in 1937 illustrating J. W. Dunne's Theory of Time through the experience of a moneyed Yorkshire family, the Conways, over a period of nineteen years from 1919 to 1937. It is widely regarded as one of the best of Priestley's Time Plays, a series of pieces for theatre which played with different concepts of Time that also includes An Inspector Calls, and it continues to be revived in the UK regularly.

In 1947 the script was re-published in a Pan Books paperback titled Three Time-Plays, collected with the author's Dangerous Corner and I Have Been Here Before.

== Plot ==
Time and the Conways is in three acts. The first act is set in the Conway house in 1919 on the night of the birthday of one of the daughters, Kay. Act Two moves to the same night in 1937 and is set in the same room in the house. Act Three then returns to 1919, seconds after Act One left off.

In the first Act we meet the Conway family, Mrs Conway, her daughters Kay, Hazel, Madge and Carol and her sons Alan and Robin. Three other characters appear: Gerald, a solicitor; Joan, a young woman in love with Robin; and Ernest, a young, ambitious entrepreneur of a lower social class. Act One's atmosphere is one of festivity as the family celebrates the end of the War and look forward to great future of fame, prosperity and fulfilled dreams. In a pensive moment when Kay is left alone on stage she seems to slip into a reverie and has a vision of the future.

Act Two plunges us into the shattered lives of the Conways exactly eighteen years later. Gathering in the same room where they were celebrating in Act One we see how their lives have failed in different ways. Robin has become a dissolute travelling salesman, estranged from his wife Joan, Madge has failed to realise her socialist dreams, Carol is dead, Hazel is married to the sadistic but wealthy Ernest. Kay has succeeded to a certain extent as an independent woman but has not realised her dreams of novel writing. Worst of all, Mrs Conway's fortune has been squandered, the family home is to be sold and the children's inheritance is gone. As the Act unfolds resentments and tensions explode and the Conways are split apart by misery and grief. Only Alan, the quietest of the family, seems to possess a quiet calm. In the final scene of the Act, Alan and Kay are left on stage and, as Kay expresses her misery Alan suggests to her that the secret of life is to understand its true reality – that the perception that Time is linear and that we have to grab and take what we can before we die is false. If we can see Time as eternally present, that at any given moment we are seeing only 'a cross section of ourselves,' then we can transcend our suffering and find no need to hurt or have conflict with other people.

Act Three returns us to 1919 and we see how the seeds of the downfall of the Conways were being sown even then. Ernest is snubbed by Hazel and Mrs Conway, Gerald's budding love for Madge is destroyed by the snobbery of Mrs Conway in another moment of social arrogance, Alan is rejected by Joan who becomes betrothed to Robin. As the children gather at the end of the play for Mrs. Conway to foretell their future, Kay has a moment of memory of the vision of Act Two we have seen unfold. Disturbed, she steps out of the party and the play ends with Alan promising that he will be able to tell her something in the future which will help her.

== About the play ==
The play works on the level of a universal human tragedy and a powerful portrait of the history of Britain between the Wars. Priestley shows how through a process of complacency and class arrogance, Britain allowed itself to decline and collapse between 1919 and 1937, instead of realizing the availability of immense creative and humanistic potential accessible during the post-war (the Great War) generation. Priestley could clearly see the tide of history leading towards another major European conflict as he has his character Ernest comment in 1937 that they are coming to 'the next war'.

Thus Time and the Conways operates on many different levels – a political history of Britain between the wars, a universal tragedy, a family romance and a metaphysical examination of Time. As such it is one of Priestley's most accomplished and many-layered works for the stage, combining as it does an extremely accessible naturalistic style, heavily tinged with dramatic irony, with a network of sophisticated ideas and insights, which combine to make it one of his most popular plays.

The play emerged from Priestley's reading of J. W. Dunne's book An Experiment with Time in which Dunne posits that all time is happening simultaneously; i.e., that past, present, future are one and that linear time is only the way in which human consciousness is able to perceive this.

Priestley uses the idea to show how human beings experience loss, failure and the death of their dreams but also how, if they could experience reality in its transcendent nature, they might find a way out. The idea is not dissimilar to that presented by mysticism and religion that if human beings could understand the transcendent nature of their existence the need for greed and conflict would come to an end.

== West End ==
The play premiered at the Duchess Theatre in the West End in August 1937. The cast comprised Alexander Archdale, Wilfred Babbage, Eileen Erskine, Barbara Everest, Jean Forbes-Robertson, Helen Horsey, Marie Johns, J. P. Mitchelhill, Molly Rankin and Rosemary Scott.

== Broadway ==
The play opened on Broadway at the Ritz Theatre on 3 January 1938, and closed on 29 January 1938, and starred Sybil Thorndike.

The play was revived on Broadway in a Roundabout Theatre production at the American Airlines Theatre. The play ran from 10 October 2017 to 26 November 2017. Directed by Rebecca Taichman, the cast featured Elizabeth McGovern (Mrs. Conway), Steven Boyer (Ernest), Gabriel Ebert (Alan), Anna Baryshnikov (Carol), Anna Camp (Hazel), Charlotte Parry (Kay Conway) and Matthew James Thomas (Robin).

== Adaptations ==
In 1962 it was made into a West German film The Happy Years of the Thorwalds directed by Wolfgang Staudte and starring Elisabeth Bergner.

In 1984, the play was adapted for film by the Soviet studio Mosfilm and was directed by Vladimir Basov. It starred Rufina Nifontova as Mrs. Conway, Vladimir Basov Jr. as Ernest Beevers in youth, Vladimir Basov as Ernest Beevers at maturity and Margarita Volodina as Kay.

Time and the Conways was adapted in 1985 by BBC for television with Claire Bloom as Mrs Conway, Phyllis Logan as Kay, Nicholas Le Prevost as Gerald, Geraldine James as Madge and Simon Shepherd as Robin.

The play has also adapted several times for BBC Radio.

In 1984, BBC Manchester recorded audio adaptations of the three plays published in Three Time-Plays, which were broadcast on BBC Radio 4 and repeated in 2025. In Time and the Conways, Hazel Conway was played by Sue Jenkins.

Another BBC Radio 4 adaptation, directed by Sue Wilson, was broadcast on 12 August 1994 (later re-broadcast on 23 May 2010 over BBC Radio 7). The cast included Marcia Warren as Mrs. Conway, Belinda Sinclair as Kay, John Duttine as Alan, Toby Stephens as Robin, Emma Fielding as Carol, Stella Gonet as Madge, Amanda Redman as Hazel, John McArdle as Ernest and Christopher Scott as Gerald.

A new BBC Radio 3 adaptation was broadcast on 14 September 2014 with Harriet Walter as Mrs. Conway, Anna Madeley as Kay, Rupert Evans as Alan and Michael Bertenshaw as J. B. Priestley.

Googie Withers starred as Mrs. Conway in a Chichester Festival Theatre production. Priestley – with whom she was friendly – came to the opening night. When the young woman sitting next to him in the theatre, and not realising who he was, commented she did not really understand what it was all about, he replied: "Neither do I, and I wrote the bloody thing!" During World War II, Googie Withers starred in the original production of They Came to a City. She played the same role in the film version.
