= Georgina Kermode =

Suffragette, metallurgist and engineering entrepreneur

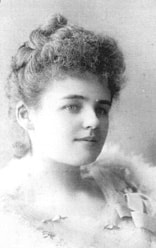
- Born: 1868; Barnet, United Kingdom
- Died: 5 September 1923 (aged 54–55); Middlesex

Georgina Kermode MIM (1868 – 5 September 1923) was a suffragette, metallurgist, engineering entrepreneur and holder of numerous patents. In 1916 she became the first woman member of the Institute of Metals.

== Early life ==
Kermode was born Georgina Elizabeth Fawns in Barnet, United Kingdom in 1868, daughter of the Rev. J. Fawns, of Launceston. Her family were from Tasmania and when she was seventeen Kermode married another Tasmanian landowner Robert Crellin Kermode. She lived in Mona Vale, on a building known as Calendar House, probably as a result of its 12 chimneys.

== Suffrage ==
By the time she was twenty seven, Kermode had become an active suffragette and ran the Campbell Town Woman's Christian Temperance Union. Kermode became the Colonial Suffrage Superintendent of the WCTU. She organised propaganda to put pressure on politicians and in 1896 she arranged a winter campaign of meetings and petitions all over Tasmania. She worked with Jessie Rooke.

== Career ==
Kermode's husband held mining interests and Kermode became a director of the Tasmanian Metals Extraction Co. Ltd. She became an expert in the metal ores of Tasmania. The business had technical difficulties in reaching the metals and Kermode travelled to England to gain expertise in the electrolytic extraction for the treatment of the zinc-lead ores in about 1904. Kermode did not return to Australia. Her husband did travel to the UK when he joined the army in 1914. From 1907 to 1923 Kermode took out patents for a variety of inventions. There were 27 across the United Kingdom, France, Switzerland, Denmark and the United States. Her main inventions related to the automatic vending of postage stamps. The UK post office bought her automatic machines and the very first of them was put in Houses of Parliament. They were in place until 1920. One of the advantages of her machines was the improved ability to detect counterfeit coins. Other patents were for improvements in furnaces, breathing apparatus for firefighters and divers, and a diving suit.

When she was elected to the Institute of Metals on 21 December 1916 Kermode became the first woman to be a member. She was proposed by Sir George Beilby, Professor Alfred Kirby Huntington and Thomas Turner. She was a regular attendee at institute events and was involved in other mining organisations. She died in Middlesex and was taken to Tasmania to be buried.
