= Colin R. Badger =

Australian adult education administrator

Colin Robert Badger (4 December 1906 – 8 August 1993), was an Australian adult education administrator.

== Career ==
Badger was born Robert Colin Badger in Petersburg, South Australia (now Peterborough), to Australian-born parents Herbert James Badger (c. 1867 – 14 February 1947), and Angelena "Lena" Badger ( –1961), née Nichols, who married at Burra in 1888. Herbert's father was Scots-born Baptist minister David Gibson Jude Badger, important in the development of the Baptist Church in South Australia's Mid North; Lena was daughter of William Nicholls of Booboorowie.

Badger's parents, who ran a haberdashery business, left Petersburg around 1916 and settled in the Adelaide suburb of Kent Town, around 1918 moving to 6 Fife Avenue Torrens Park. Badger attended North Adelaide Primary School 1911–17, Mitcham Primary 1918–19, and Unley High School 1920–23, when he was expelled for petty theft, and he found work as a laboratory assistant at the University of Adelaide. As a university employee he was entitled to attend lectures as a non-fee-paying "auditor", which entitled him to no qualifications but he did land a position at the library. He then decided on the ministry and enrolled at the Baptist College, meanwhile undertaking the university's degree course in history and philosophy part-time, winning the Tinline scholarship for history in 1931. He was employed as a lecturer by the Workers' Educational Association in Adelaide and Perth. He visited Italy 1934–35, studying the breakdown of parliamentary democracy. He graduated BA in 1936 and MA in 1938, following the publication of his thesis The Relation of Public Opinion and Law in South Australia. He was appointed Director of Adult Education at the University of Western Australia and in 1938 Director of Extension at the University of Melbourne, succeeding Professor J. A. Gunn.

== Family ==
Badger married nurse Adelaide Estella Slade on 9 November 1929. Their children include:

- Phillip David Badger (26 January 1940 – )

Badger's sister Lena Jessie Badger (died 4 March 1949) qualified as a lawyer, married George Ernest Jansen.
