= I Have Been Here Before =

Play written by J. B. Priestley

I Have Been Here Before is a play by J. B. Priestley, first produced by Lewis Casson at the Royalty Theatre, London, on 22 September 1937.

The play is one of Priestley's Time Plays, and in 1947, the script was republished in a Pan Books paperback titled Three Time-Plays, collected with the author's Dangerous Corner and Time and the Conways.

== Plot introduction ==
At a rural inn on a Yorkshire moor, three people become involved in a strange confrontation with the hallmarks of déjà vu, and a physicist attempts to prevent a disaster.

== Plot summary ==
=== Act I ===
Sam and his daughter Sally, proprietors of the Black Bull Inn, are awaiting the arrival of guests, when an elderly German professor stops to make enquiries. The inn is booked out; he asks unusual questions about the people staying at the inn, but his conjectures appear to be wrong. Shortly after he is turned away, the three women they had been expecting cancel their bookings by telephone. Sally is annoyed at the cancellation, but almost immediately they receive another telephone call from Mr and Mrs Ormund, a wealthy couple who book two rooms.

Their other guest, the schoolmaster Oliver Farrant, returns from a walk, and is closely followed by the professor, who has seen him enter. The professor introduces himself as Dr Görtler, a German refugee, and asks eagerly for a room.

When the Ormunds arrive, Mr Farrant is startled to realise that they are his new employers; the Ormunds are starting a school, and have already appointed him as headmaster. They chat briefly, but Mr Ormund does not talk to him, and expresses reservations to his wife. Dr Görtler joins the Ormunds and unnerves them by asking strangely accurate questions about their feelings of déjà vu. When Görtler has gone to bed, Sally explains to the other guests the inexplicably successful predictions the professor had made that afternoon about their identities.

=== Act II ===
Mr Farrant and Mrs Ormund go out walking for the day. In their absence, Dr Görtler interrogates Mr Ormund about his life. His probing into Mr Ormund's emotional state induces the unhappy man to make a quasi-suicide attempt, fetching a revolver from his car and firing it into the ground. Upset by Dr Görtler's questions and by his expounding of a doctrine of eternal return to the landlord and guests, Sally and Mr Ormund demand that he leaves. When Mr Farrant and Mrs Ormund come back from their walk, they admit to each other that they have studiously avoided crossing paths all day, in an unconscious attempt to fend off the fatalistic sense that they are doomed to deceive Mr Ormund. As the clock chimes, they embrace.

=== Act III ===
Mr Farrant examines Dr Görtler's forgotten notebook. When Mr Ormund arrives, Mr Farrant and Mrs Ormund announce that they are leaving together. The sense of déjà vu is so overpowering that all of their emotional reactions are muted. Dr Görtler returns for his notebook, and explains to them that he was brought here by a precognitive dream: this pair would elope, Mr Ormund would commit suicide, the school would fold, and the lives would be ruined of all concerned. As a result of Dr Görtler's intervention, there is no suicide. Mr Farrant and Mrs Ormund leave, but Mr Ormund takes the blow calmly, realising that his life has been saved.

== Characters ==
- Sally Pratt
- Sam Shipley
- Dr Görtler
- Oliver Farrant
- Janet Ormund
- Walter Ormund

== References to other works ==
The play was inspired by conjectures in P. D. Ouspensky's book A New Model of the Universe (1931). Ouspensky had already expressed these ideas in fiction with Strange Life of Ivan Osokin (1915, translated 1947).

The play also has a few links to Priestley's An Inspector Calls (1945), another very famous piece of work by Priestley.

== British television and radio adaptations ==
The first television version was broadcast live by the BBC on May 29, 1949 , and starred Gerard Heinz as Dr. Gortler, and Bernard Lee as Walter Ormund. It was restaged live on June 2, 1949 by the same cast. The BBC broadcast a second version of the play on March 27, 1960, featuring Michael Hordern, William Russell, and Ursula Howells .

The most recent television production was broadcast by the BBC on May 4, 1982 and starred Herbert Lom and Anthony Valentine.

Radio versions of the play were broadcast by the BBC in October 1938 , starring Ralph Richardson and Celia Johnson; in 1952 with Marius Goring and Barbara Lott ; and in 1984 with Lesley Nicol and Ronald Baddiley. The 1984 version, made by BBC Manchester, was broadcast as part of a series with the two other plays published in Three Time-Plays, and has been re-broadcast on BBC Radio 4 Extra.

To date there have been no commercial releases of any broadcast version of the play.

== 1964 Australian TV Adaptation ==
I Have Been Here Before
- Based on: play by J.B. Priestley
- Directed by: Ken Hannam
- Country of origin: Australia
- Original language: English

Production
- Running time: 75 mins
- Production company: ABC

Original release
- Network: ABC
- Release: 29 January 1964 (Sydney)
- Release: 5 February 1964 (Melbourne)
- Release: 24 March 1964 (Brisbane)

It was filmed for Australian TV in 1964. It was directed by Ken Hannam.

Australian TV drama was relatively rare at the time. It aired in Melbourne on 5 February 1964.

=== Premise ===
It is set at an inn on the Yorkshire moors. Hotelier Walter Ormond and daughter Janet are looking forward to a busy few days. One guest has already arrived, Oliver Farrant, a headmaster on leave. Oliver falls for Janet. Three women are expected. Dr Gortler, a professor driven into exile by the Nazis, arrives. Dr Gortler knows about their past and has a way of controlling their future.

=== Cast ===
- Alastair Duncan as Dr Gortler
- Alexander Archdale as Walter Ormond
- Diana Perryman as Sally Pratt
- Gordon Glenwright
- John Unicomb as Oliver Farrant
- Anne Haddy as Janet Ormond

=== Production ===
It was shot at the ABC's studies at Gore Hill.

=== Reception ===
The Sydney Morning Herald said "Ken Hannam's production was throughout notable for its scrupulous craftsmanship of scene and effect" and called it "one of the ABC's most impressive local productions."

The production prompted a letter of complaint from Frank Roberts to the Sydney Morning Herald complaining about the ABC's tendency to present photographed stage plays in TV drama.
