= Dangerous Corner =

1932 play by J. B. Priestley

Dangerous Corner is a 1932 British play by the English writer J. B. Priestley, the first of his "Time Plays". It was premiered in May 1932 by Tyrone Guthrie at the Lyric Theatre, London, and filmed in 1934 by Phil Rosen. It was staged on Broadway at the Empire Theatre in 1932, and revived in New York in 1933 at the Waldorf Theatre.

Priestley had recently collaborated with Edward Knoblock on the 1931 play The Good Companions and now wished "to prove that a man might produce long novels and yet be able to write effectively, using the strictest economy, for the stage." While being praised highly by James Agate, Dangerous Corner received extremely poor reviews and after three days he was told that the play would be taken off, a fate that he averted by buying out the syndicate. It then ran for six months. Priestley's action was further vindicated by the worldwide success the play was to enjoy, although he soon lowered his estimate of this work and as early as 1938 remarked: "It is pretty thin stuff when all is said and done."

In 1947, the play was republished in a Pan Books paperback titled Three Time-Plays, along with the author's Time and the Conways and I Have Been Here Before.

== Plot ==
=== Introduction ===
Robert and Freda Caplan are entertaining guests at their country retreat. A chance remark by one of the guests ignites a series of devastating revelations, revealing a hitherto undiscovered tangle of clandestine relationships and dark secrets, the disclosures of which have tragic consequences. The play ends with time slipping back to the beginning of the evening and the chance remark not being made, the secrets remaining hidden and the "dangerous corner" avoided.

=== Act I ===
The play begins in darkness with a muffled gunshot and scream. Lights are turned on to reveal a drawing room containing four women listening to a radio play after dinner. Two of them, Freda and Betty, are the wives of directors of a publishing firm. With them are Olwen, a close friend of Freda and Betty, and Maud Mockridge, a novelist whose books are published by the firm.

Their chat has turned to the suicide the previous year of Freda's brother-in-law Martin Caplan when they are interrupted by the entry of the husbands, Robert and Gordon, along with Charles, who works at the firm. They discuss whether it is best always to reveal the complete truth; Robert argues that it is, while Charles believes doing so is dangerous. Gordon tries to find some dance music on the radio, but it stops working. Freda offers Olwen a cigarette from a musical box, which Olwen recognizes as having belonged to Martin. Freda insists that Olwen could not have seen the box before because Martin had not had it when Olwen saw him last. Olwen accepts Freda's correction and the matter is about to be dropped, but Robert detects that Olwen, despite her verbal acquiescence, is not really convinced. He pushes the women to be honest about their disagreement. In examining the question of how Olwen could have previously seen Martin's cigarette box, each woman reveals that she has been keeping secret the fact that she had visited Martin shortly before his death. At this point, with tensions rising, Maud takes her leave, and soon all the guests depart except Olwen.

The revelations lead Robert, Freda, and Olwen into a deeper discussion of the circumstances surrounding Martin's death. The firm had suffered a theft of £500 the previous year. The group members had assumed that Martin's suicide was an indicator that he had been the thief. However, Olwen now admits that on her final visit to Martin, she learned that he had not stolen the money and further that he believed the thief to be Robert, having been led to that suspicion by Charles. She had not previously mentioned this because she was secretly in love with Robert, which prompts Robert's admission that his and Freda's marriage is unhappy. Robert is shocked both at the accusation that he is the thief and at hearing that Charles had suggested such. Robert snatches the telephone and demands that Gordon and Charles return.

=== Act II ===
Charles admits that he deliberately led Robert and Martin to suspect one another to cover the fact that he had taken the money himself. But he insists that he was planning to return it within a week and that it was not the cause of Martin's suicide. As others try to blame him for Martin's death, he remains defiant in his insistence that Robert should never have begun the process of revealing secrets. Increasingly angry over having been forced into his confession, Charles admits to having had a personal contempt for Martin and suggests that there are still more secrets being kept that are the reason. Knowing that hers is one of the secrets to which Charles is referring, Freda now confesses that the reason her marriage to Robert has been unhappy is that she was having an affair with Martin and had long been in love with him. A jealous Gordon then proclaims that he too was in love with Martin, and he declares himself to have been a much greater object of Martin's affection than Freda had been. At this point, Betty arrives at the house, indignant at being left out, to discover the men on the brink of fighting.

=== Act III ===
As the group continues to angrily blame Charles for causing Martin's suicide, Olwen finally offers that Martin's death was not a suicide. Rather, she accidentally shot Martin while struggling with him; in a drug-fuelled rage, he lunged at her with a gun and tried to rape her. Afterwards, she drove to Charles's cottage for help but left immediately after realizing that Betty was spending the night there. This leaves Robert crestfallen, as he had been in love with the highly idealized view he had had of Betty. Charles's ongoing affair with Betty had been the reason he had become cash-strapped and stolen the money. After a great deal of bitter discussion, all the guests but Olwen leave, totally alienated from one another.

The firm is certain to collapse. Robert realizes that his happiness had been entirely built upon illusions and that as such, he had been foolish to insist upon pursuing the complete truth of the situation. His illusions, and with them his happiness, are now destroyed beyond all hope of repair. In despair, he goes into his room and Freda suddenly remembers that he keeps a revolver there. As she tears out after him, the lights fade, and we hear a shot and a scream.

When the lights are turned back on, we find ourselves at the beginning of Act I. The opening scene is repeated in a shortened version. As before, Olwen recognizes the cigarette box, but this time, before Freda can object to that recognition, Gordon interrupts upon finding the dance music that he was searching for on the radio. He calls everyone to listen, diverting the conversation before it leads into any of the particulars of Martin's death. With all of the secrets remaining unrevealed, a happy after-dinner party commences for all.

== Characters ==
- Robert Caplan
- Freda Caplan
- Betty Whitehouse
- Gordon Whitehouse
- Olwen Peel
- Charles Trevor Stanton
- Maud Mockridge

== Translation ==
Dangerous Corner was adapted as Virage dangereux in a French version by Michel Arnaud and played at the Théâtre Pigalle, Paris, in February 1938 in a production by Raymond Rouleau. Arnaud also made a French adaptation of An Inspector Calls (Un inspecteur vous demande).

== Film adaptation ==
In 1934, Dangerous Corner was adapted by RKO Radio Pictures to a film directed by Phil Rosen and starring Virginia Bruce, Conrad Nagel and Melvyn Douglas. Produced shortly after strict enforcement of the Hays Code had begun, the Hollywood version removed some of the most controversial elements of the play, including the homosexual relationship between Gordon and Martin, Martin's drug use, and Betty's adultery with Charles. The film also begins with scenes, set in the year prior to the dinner party, depicting the discovery of the theft and Martin's body after his death. In the play, those events are not depicted but only recalled by the characters within their dialogue.

== Novelization ==
In 1933, Mellifont Library of London issued a paperback novelization, by Ruth Holland, of the play, whose cover proclaimed "With the Co-Operation of J.B. Priestley." It also contained a foreword by the playwright, who felt the need to explain the book's provenance, since (as he notes) novels based on plays were (at the time) a far rarer occurrence than plays based on novels (though the practice goes back to at least the late 1800s; even screenplay novelizations were infrequent, though they would soon gain in popularity). Three years later, Holland performed novelization honours again for Priestley's Laburnum Grove, citing both the play and the screenplay as sources. She was at the time known for at least one work of popular contemporary fiction of her own, The Lost Generation, a wartime novel. She was also, by way of Priestley's second marriage, his sister-in-law.

== Further broadcast productions ==
Dangerous Corner was adapted for Australian television in 1965, director Patrick Barton.

In 1972, the play was adapted by Mosfilm for USSR TV as Opasny Povorot (Dangerous Turn). Directed by Vladimir Basov, starring Yury Yakovlev as Robert Caplan, Valentina Titova as Freda Caplan, Vladimir Basov as Charles Stanton.

In 1983 the play was aired in BBC television's Play of the Month series, directed by James Ormerod, with Daniel Day-Lewis included in the cast.

BBC Manchester recorded audio adaptations of the three plays published in Three Time-Plays, which were broadcast on BBC Radio 4 in 1984. In Dangerous Corner, Martin Jarvis was Robert Caplan and Helen Worth was Betty Whitehouse.
