= George Nugent Merle Tyrrell =

British mathematician, physicist, radio engineer and parapsychologist

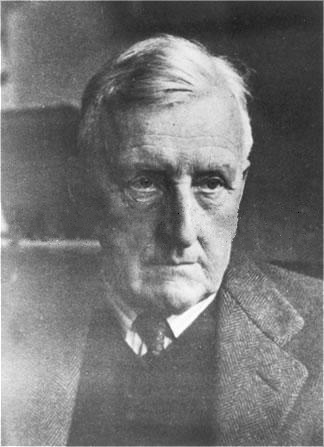
- Born: 23 March 1879
- Died: 29 October 1952 (aged 73)
- Occupation(s): Mathematician, Parapsychologist

George Nugent Merle Tyrrell (23 March 1879 – 29 October 1952), best known as G. N. M. Tyrrell, was a British mathematician, physicist, radio engineer and parapsychologist.

== Biography ==
Tyrrell was born in Frome, Somerset to Nugent and Margery Tyrrell. His father was a civil engineer, and his grandfather, George Nugent Tyrrell, was the first "Superintendent of the Line" for the Great Western Railway.

Tyrrell was a student of Guglielmo Marconi and a pioneer in the development of radio. In 1908 he joined the Society for Psychical Research. He conducted numerous experiments in telepathy and was interested in apparitional experiences. He attempted to explain ghosts by a psychological theory.

Tyrrell proposed that ghosts are a hallucination of the subconscious mind of a person, to explain collective hallucinations for more than one person, he proposed it as a telepathic mechanism. Tyrrell was the president of the Society for Psychical Research 1945-1946.

Although a believer in telepathy, Tyrrell was a critic of physical mediumship. He stated that it has been the "happy hunting ground of tricksters and charlatans."

Tyrrell created the term out-of-body experience in his book Apparitions.

A review in Nature for Science and Psychical Phenomena praised Tyrrell for his "obvious sincerity" but suggested the book was "full of flaws" which aroused suspicion of Tyrrell's critical faculties.

== Published works ==
- Grades of Significance (1931)
- Science and Psychical Phenomena (1938)
- Apparitions (1943)
- The Personality of Man (1946)
- Homo Faber: A Study of Man's Mental Evolution (1951)
- Man the Maker: A Study of Man's Mental Evolution (1952)

== See also ==
- Whately Carington
