= M. F. Cleugh =

20th century philosopher

M.F. Cleugh (1913–1986) (Mary Frances Cleugh) was a philosopher and educationalist. For many years she worked at the University of London in their Education department. On retirement she went to live in Shropshire. She is most known for her 1936 PhD work The problem of time, with special reference to its importance for modern thought also at the University of London, which was published in 1937 by Methuen and which has been reprinted several times. Her later work took a psychological slant on the education of those with particular difficulties... the old, the mature or the "slow" learners. She led a one-year course for teachers of ESN children at the, Institute of Education, University of London and was a Reader in the same department. She herself argued that her interests lie mainly in the borderland where philosophy, psychology, and education meet.

== Selected works ==
- Cleugh, M. F. 1936. The problem of time, with special reference to its importance for modern thought. PhD University of London.
- Cleugh, M. F. 1937. Time and its importance in modern thought. London: Methuen.
- Cleugh, M. F. 1968. The slow learner: Some educational principles and policies. Methuen.
- Cleugh, M.F., 1970. Educating older people (Vol. 68). Tavistock Publications.
