= Music at Night (play) =

Music at Night is a play by J. B. Priestley. Although written in 1938 for the Malvern Drama Festival, and performed there on 2 August, the outbreak of World War II meant that its performance in London at the Westminster Theatre was delayed until 10 October 1939; it was the first play to be performed in London after restrictions were lifted. It was published in 1944.

== Plot introduction ==
An assortment of middle- and upper-class people come to the house of the widowed Mrs Amesbury to hear a new violin concerto by David Shiel. As the music plays their minds wander, and their reveries are theatrically performed. Each act of the play corresponds with a movement of the concerto: Allegro capriccioso, Lento, and Allegro — agitato — maestoso nobile.

== Characters ==
- David Shiel, a composer
- Nicholas Lengel, first violin, a refugee
- Mrs Amesbury, a wealthy sponsor
- Katherine Shiel, David's wife
- Peter Horlett, a Communist poet
- Ann Winter, a childhood friend and fan of Peter
- Philip Chilham, a columnist for the Daily Gazette
- Lady Sybil Linchester, a tactless wit from a rich family
- Sir James Dirnie, her husband, an aspiring patron of the arts
- Charles Bendrex, a Cabinet minister
- Parks, an elderly manservant
- Rupert Amesbury, a pilot, the deceased son of Mrs Amesbury
- Mrs Chilham, Philip's mother
- Tom, a former coworker whom Sir James betrayed
- Deborah, Sybil's elder sister
- Dr Ebenthal, David's former teacher in Vienna
