= John Alexander Gunn =

20th-century British philosopher (1896–1975)

John Alexander Gunn (1896–1975) was a philosopher who earned his Ph.D. from the University of Liverpool and worked there as a fellow. He went on to be appointed as a professor at the University of Melbourne in 1923 and retired in 1938. His successor as Director of Extension was Colin R. Badger.

== Writings ==
- Bergson and His Philosophy (1920)
- Modern French Philosophy: a Study of the Development Since Comte (1922)
- Wealth (1924)
- Benedict Spinoza (1925)
- Livelihood (1927)
- The Problem of Time: An Historical & Critical Study (1929)
- Spinoza, The Maker Of Lenses (1932)
