= Griffith Brewer =

British aviator

Griffith Brewer (23 July 1867 – 1 March 1948) was an English balloonist, aviator and patent agent. He was also a founding member of the Royal Aero Club. He became a friend of the Wright Brothers, and was one of their main supporters.

On 8 October 1908 at Camp d'Auvours, France, 11 kilometers east of Le Mans, Griffith flew as a passenger with Wilbur Wright. The flight lasted for 4 minutes and 22 seconds. In doing so, he became the first Englishman to go up in an aeroplane. Prior to this, Griffith had been a doubter about the chances of heavier-than-air machines being at all successful for flying. The Wrights also had many other doubters in Europe before those demonstrations in France. But after this flight in 1908, and the demonstrations by them, he became a close friend and supporter of the Wright brothers and made many trips to the United States to visit them. Griffith gained his pilot licence in 1914.

He arranged that the British government should get use of the Wright's patents for £15,000 in 1914. This meant that British aircraft manufacturers were free of the threat of litigation.

Griffith was President of the Royal Aeronautical Society (RAeS) from 1940 to 1942.
