= Angle of incidence (aerodynamics) =

Aircraft wing angle

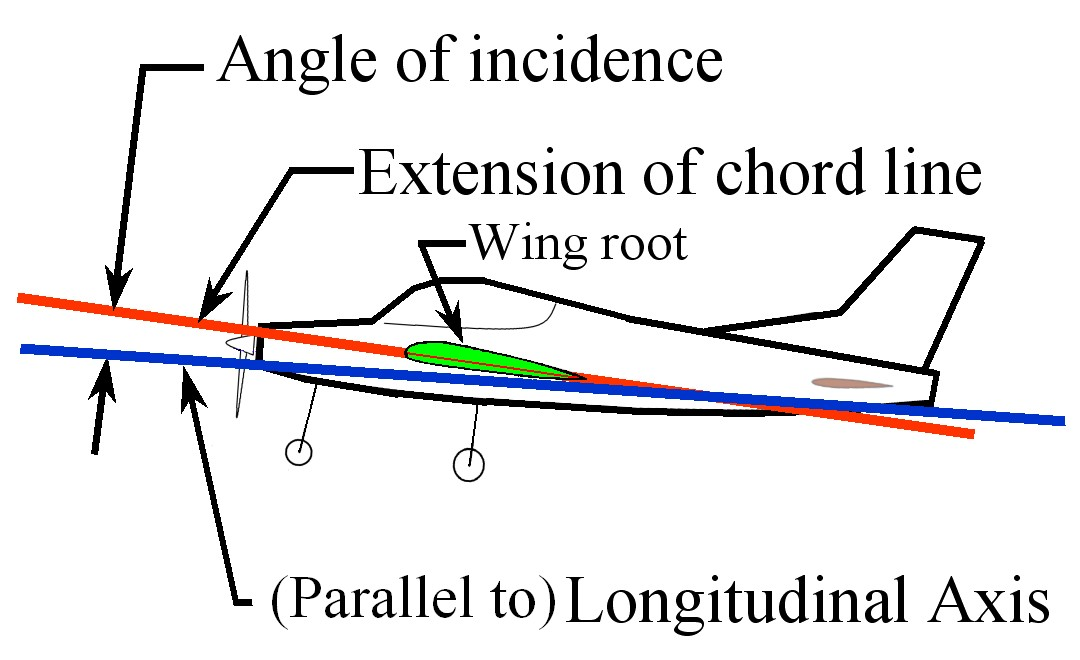
Angle of incidence of an airplane wing on an airplane.

On fixed-wing aircraft, the angle of incidence (sometimes referred to as the mounting angle or setting angle) is the angle between the chord line of the wing where the wing is mounted to the fuselage, and a reference axis along the fuselage (often the direction of minimum drag, or where applicable, the longitudinal axis). The angle of incidence is fixed in the design of the aircraft, and with rare exceptions, cannot be varied in flight.

The term can also be applied to horizontal surfaces in general (such as canards or horizontal stabilizers) for the angle they make relative the longitudinal axis of the fuselage.

The figure to the right shows a side view of an airplane. The extended chord line of the wing root (red line) makes an angle with the longitudinal axis (roll axis) of the aircraft (blue line). Wings are typically mounted at a small positive angle of incidence, to allow the fuselage to have a low angle with the airflow in cruising flight. Angles of incidence of about 6° are common on most general aviation designs. Other terms for angle of incidence in this context are rigging angle and rigger's angle of incidence.

The angle of incidence should not be confused with the angle of attack, which is the angle the wing chord presents to the airflow in flight. However some ambiguity in this terminology exists, as some engineering texts that focus solely on the study of airfoils and their medium may use either term when referring to angle of attack.

On rotary–wing aircraft, the AoA (Angle of Attack) is the angle between the airfoil chord line and resultant relative wind. AoA is an aerodynamic angle. It can change with no change in the AoI (Angle of Incidence). Several factors may change the rotor blade AoA. Pilots control some of those factors; others occur automatically due to the rotor system design. Pilots adjust AoA through normal control manipulation; however, even with no pilot input AoA will change as an integral part of travel of the rotor blade through the rotor-disc. This continuous process of change accommodates rotary-wing flight. Pilots have little control over blade flapping and flexing, gusty wind, and/or turbulent air conditions. AoA is one of the primary factors determining amount of lift and drag produced by an airfoil.
