= Farrington (surname) =

Farrington is an English surname. Notable people with the surname include:

== Surname ==
- Adele Farrington (1867–1936), American actor
- Amy Farrington (born 1966), American actor
- Sir Anthony Farrington, 1st Baronet (1742–1823), General of the British Army
- Benjamin Farrington (1891–1974), Irish classicist
- Betty Farrington (1898–1989), American character actress
- Bo Farrington (1936–1964), American football player
- Colleen Farrington (1936–2015), American model and nightclub singer
- David P. Farrington (1944–2024), British criminologist
- Don Farrington (died 2000), American aviator
- Edward Silsby Farrington (1856–1929), American judge
- Elizabeth P. Farrington (1898–1984), Honolulu Star-Bulletin publisher, Congressional Delegate for the Territory of Hawaii and wife of Joseph Rider Farrington
- Fram Farrington (1908–2002), polar explorer
- Frank Farrington (actor) (1873–1924), American silent film actor
- Frank Farrington (rugby league) (1926–2014), Australian rugby league player
- Frank G. Farrington (1872–1933), American lawyer and politician from Maine
- Fred Farrington (1867–1924), British footballer
- George Farrington (1882–1960), English footballer
- Gregory C. Farrington, American academic administrator
- Harry Webb Farrington (1879–1930), American author
- Hugh Farrington (1931–2001), American actor
- Iain Farrington (born 1977), British pianist, organist, composer and arranger
- James Farrington (1791–1859), New Hampshire politician
- Jeff Farrington, American politician from Michigan
- John Farrington (disambiguation)
- Joseph Rider Farrington (1897–1954), American newspaper editor and delegate to the United States House of Representatives for the Territory of Hawaii
- Josie Farrington, Baroness Farrington of Ribbleton (1940–2018), British Labour Party politician
- Kaitlyn Farrington (born 1989), American snowboarder
- Kenneth Farrington (born 1936), English actor
- Kent Farrington (born 1980), American equestrian
- Logan Farrington (born 2001), American soccer player
- Mark Farrington (born 1965), English footballer
- Michael Farrington (born 1966), Canadian ice dancer
- Neil Farrington (died 2009), English musician
- Oliver C. Farrington (1864–1934), American geologist
- Richard Farrington (1702–1772), Welsh Anglican priest and antiquarian
- Sam Farrington (born 2004), New Hampshire politician
- S. Kip Farrington (1904–1983), American writer
- Sinead Farrington, British particle physicist
- Sloane Farrington (1923–1997), Bahamian competitive sailor
- Suzanne Farrington (1933–2015), married name of the only child of actress Vivien Leigh
- Thomas Farrington (disambiguation)
- Wallace Rider Farrington (1871–1933), American journalist and Governor of the Territory of Hawaii
- William Farrington (soldier) (fl. 1412), English soldier and diplomat
- William Farrington (Royalist) (died 1659), English politician
- Yolanda Ivonne Montes Farrington (born 1932), American-born exotic dancer and actor

== Fictional characters ==
- Harriet Farrington, protagonist of 1980s British TV series Farrington of the F.O.
- James Farrington, an antagonist in the film Executive Action, portrayed by Burt Lancaster

== See also ==
- Farrington Daniels (1889–1972), American physical chemist
