= William Farrington =

William Farrington may refer to:

- William Farrington (soldier), English soldier and diplomat
- Sir William Hicks Farrington, 5th Baronet (1838–1901), of the Farrington baronets
- William Farrington (Royalist), English politician

== See also ==
- Farrington (name)
