= Farrington =

Farrington may refer to:

== Geography ==
=== Places in the United Kingdom ===
- Farrington, Dorset, England, a settlement in Iwerne Courtney civil parish
- Farrington Gurney, Somerset, England

=== Places in the United States ===
- Farrington, North Carolina
- Farrington Township, Jefferson County, Illinois
- Farrington, Washington

=== Others ===
- Farrington House, historic house in Concord, New Hampshire
- Farrington House, Alderley, a heritage-listed house in Brisbane, Queensland, Australia
- Farrington Highway, Oahu, Hawaii
- Farrington Island, Antarctica
- Farrington Lake, Middlesex County, New Jersey
- Farrington Ridge, Antarctica
- The Farrington, Anguilla
- Farrington High School, Honolulu, Hawaii, named for Wallace Rider Farrington

== Other uses ==
- Farrington (surname), an English surname
- Farrington Aircraft, defunct American manufacturer of autogyros
- Farrington baronets, a title in the Baronetage of the United Kingdom
- Farrington Field, stadium in Fort Worth, Texas
- Farrington of the F.O., British television comedy series
- Farrington v. Tokushige (1927), a U.S. Supreme Court case
- Farrington's Regiment or the 29th (Worcestershire) Regiment of Foot, infantry regiment of the British Army

== See also ==
- Faringdon, Oxfordshire, England
- Farington (disambiguation)
- Farringdon (disambiguation)
