= John Farrington =

John Farrington may refer to:

- John Farrington (footballer) (born 1947), English professional footballer
- John Farrington (athlete) (1942–2025), Australian long-distance runner
- John Farrington (MP) (1609–1680), Member of Parliament (MP) for Chichester
- John Farrington (Massachusetts colonist), early American colonist
- John Farrington (Massachusetts politician) (died 1843), Member of the Great and General Court of Massachusetts
- Bo Farrington (1936–1964), American football player

== See also ==
- Farrington (disambiguation)
