= Farington (disambiguation) =

Farington is a small village and civil parish in Lancashire, England.

Farington may also refer to:

- Farington (surname)
- Farington railway station

== See also ==
- Faringdon, Oxfordshire, England
- Farington Moss
- Farringdon (disambiguation)
- Farrington (disambiguation)
