= Ulster Aviation Society =

Aviation museum in Northern Ireland

- Established: 1968
- Location: Long Kesh, Lisburn, Northern Ireland, UK
- Coordinates: 54.4911°N 6.11249°W
- Type: Aviation museum
- Chairperson: Raymond Burrows MBE
- Employees: 0
- Parking: 100 yards (91 m)
- Website: www.ulsteraviationsociety.org

The Ulster Aviation Society (UAS) is a charitable organisation run entirely by volunteers with a wide interest in aviation, with a focus of "furthering a public interest in the history of aviation". It has a Heritage Collection based at Long Kesh, Lisburn, Northern Ireland. housing around 40 military and civil aircraft and rotorcraft along with vehicles and a large number of related items.

== History ==
The UAS started in 1968, originally located at Newtownards Aerodrome, and had moved to the disused airfield of RAF Langford Lodge by 1994, occupying buildings including the control tower and half a hangar as their Heritage Centre.

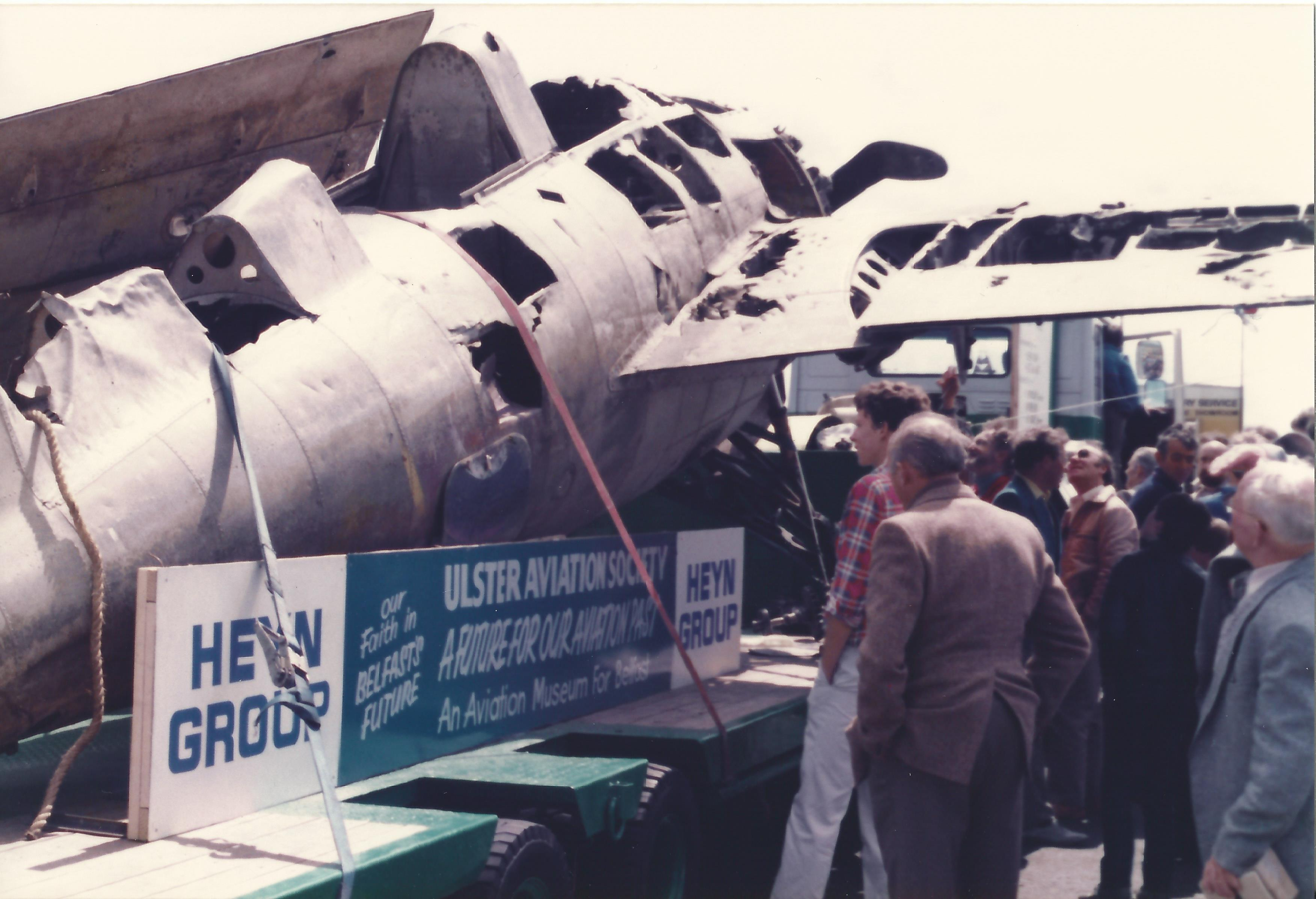
The UAS Wildcat at Newtownards Air Show in 1984

An early member was Ernie Cromie, who was the society’s chairman from 1982 until handing over to Ray Burrows in 2012, and was awarded the British Empire Medal for his efforts. Cromie and Burrows were keen researchers into aircraft wrecks in Northern Ireland. They would examine records of crashes and, with other interested members of the society, visit the crash sites, often recovering aircraft parts to build their collection. The society's first full airframe, acquired in 1984, was a Grumman Wildcat, known by the Royal Navy as the Martlet, which, with the help of other groups and a British Army helicopter, had been recovered from a nearby lake, Portmore Lough. Its restoration has been slow and painstaking, but was nearing completion in 2024.

The collection moved to Long Kesh in 2005/6, where it occupies the old airfield's only remaining hangars, which, during WW2, were used by Short Brothers for the production of Short Stirling bombers. The huge hangars are scheduled monuments. The society's early years at the new location were dogged by doubts about its lease and use of the site (it is on part of the site of the former Maze prison) but these were resolved in early 2024.

Registered as a charity (registered number NIC100128) in 2014, the society was awarded The Queen's Award for Voluntary Service in 2018, at which time it had over 670 volunteers. Chairman Ray Burrows was awarded the MBE in the 2020 New Years Honours list, "For services to the Ulster Aviation Society, Heritage Sector and to the community in Northern Ireland".

== Current activities ==
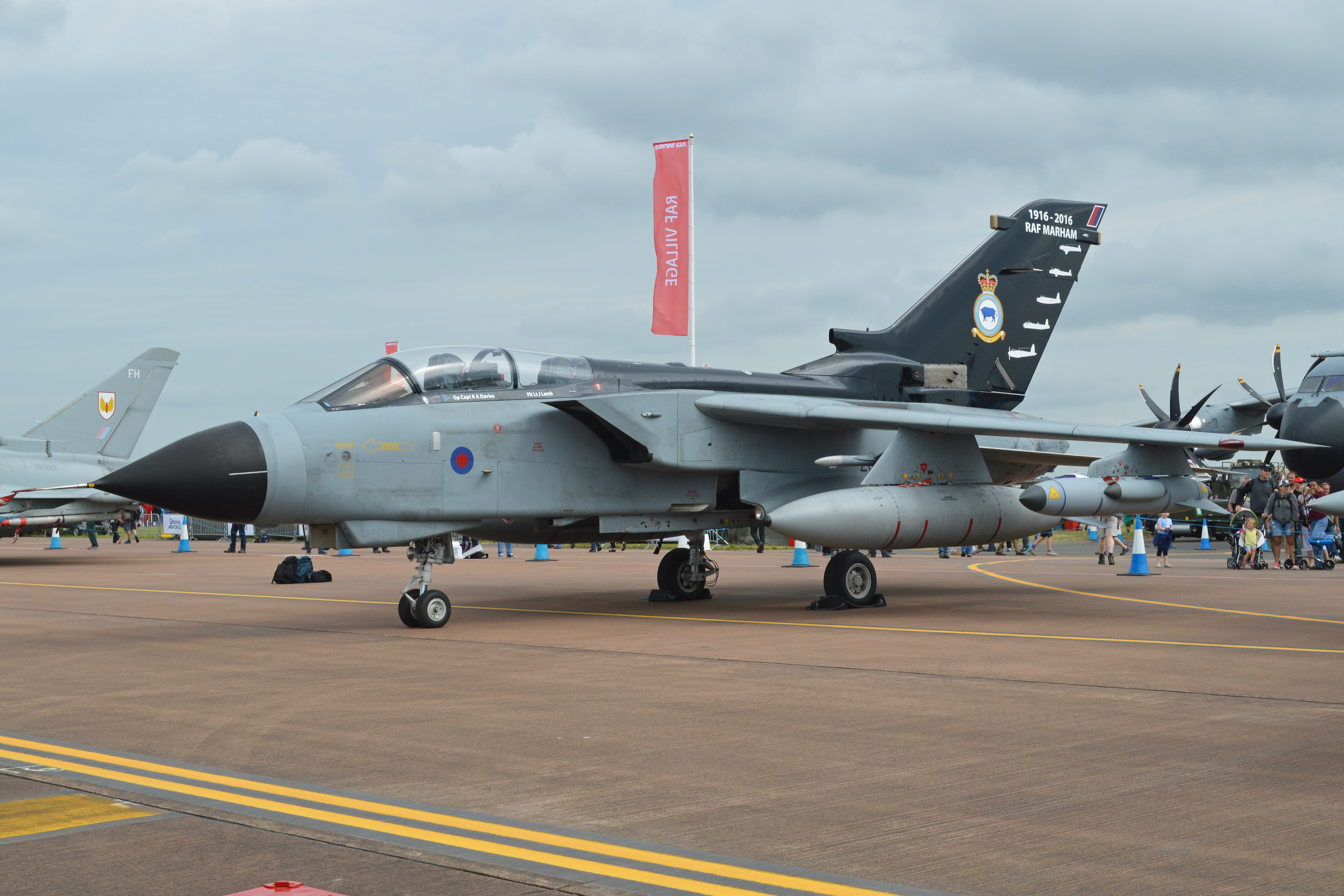
Panavia Tornado GR.4 ZG771 in 2016, gifted to UAS in 2021

In the early 2020s the UAS has been very active, acquiring several new exhibits, especially from the British armed forces. The society has developed a strong relationship with the RAF, with several RAF aircraft having been acquired for no charge, except for transport. The volunteers work on numerous projects, and also are available to guide visitors, encouraging them to sit in cockpits and touch most of the exhibits. For this reason they prefer that the facility is called a collection, avoiding the more formal title of museum. The volunteers take items such as cockpit sections to outside public events, and there are also open days at the Long Kesh site.

The society has a large collection of aviation-related material, including cockpit sections from a Tornado, a Canberra, and a de Havilland Devon, a restored tail-gun turret, and a Learjet 45 test airframe (built by Short in Belfast). There are also several themed display rooms, a library, and advanced PC-based flight simulators with VR capability and controls for fast jets, helicopters, and propeller aircraft.

As there are no formal staff, casual public walk-in visits are not allowed, and all visitors must pre-book to ensure that volunteers are available and gates and hangars are open. There is no charge for visits, but donations are welcome.

== Collection ==
As of June 2025

Military aircraft

- BAE Harrier GR.9 ZD465 arrived in March 2026

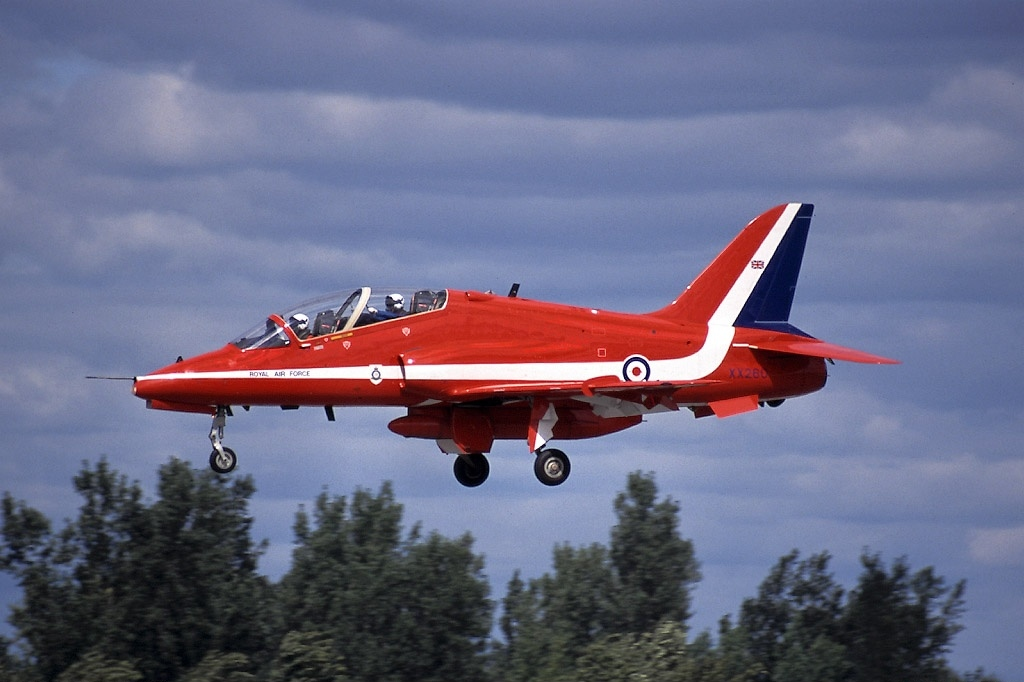
Red Arrows Hawk XX260 in 2002

- BAE Hawk T.1A XX260 gifted by RAF 2023
- Blackburn Buccaneer S.2B XV361 purchased in 1994 and flown from Aldergrove to Langford Lodge in a 4 miles (6.4 km) flight lasting 92 seconds
- De Havilland Vampire T.11 WZ549 donated by RAF in 1988

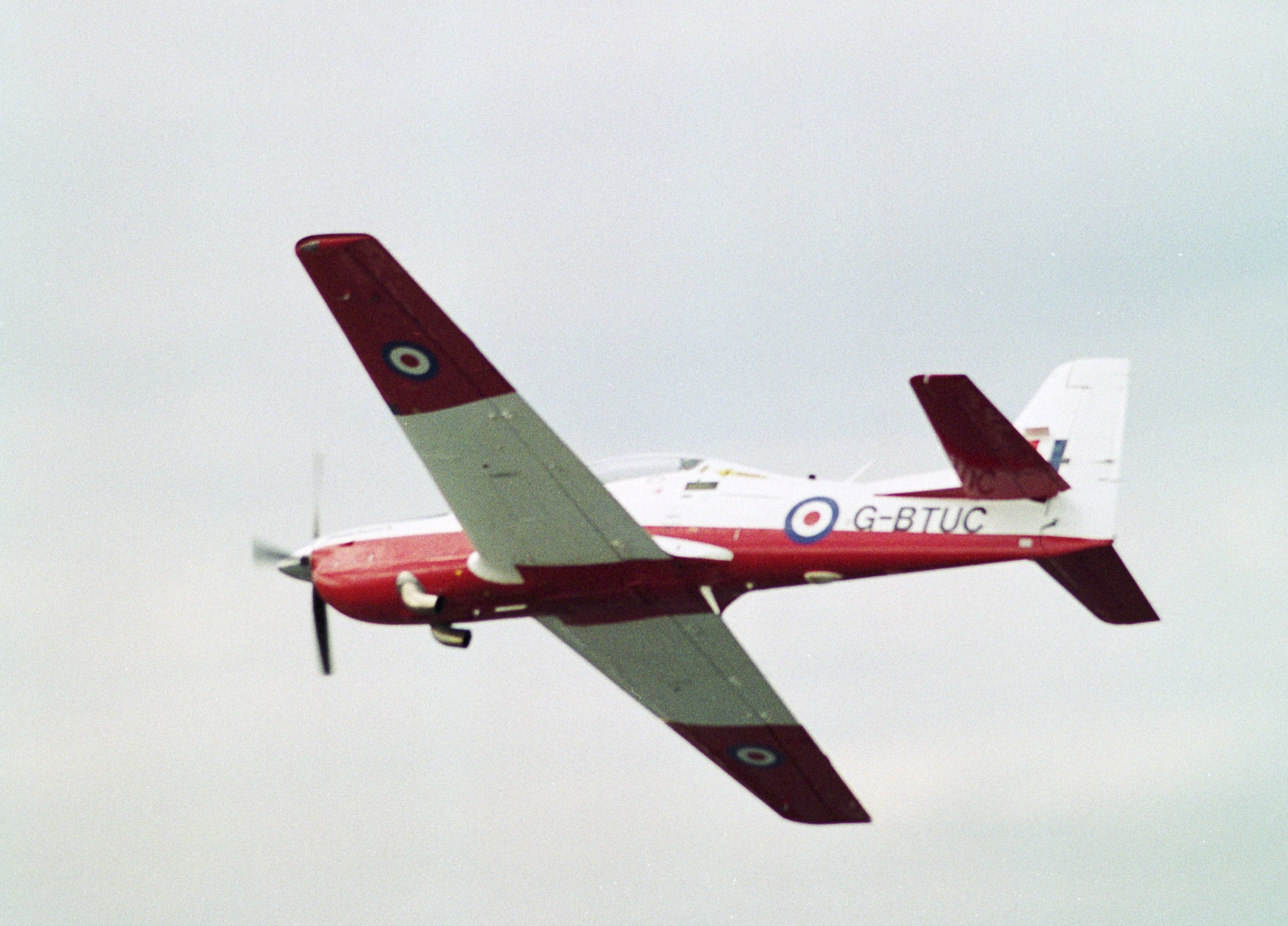
Tucano G-BTUC at the Farnborough Airshow in 1990

- Embraer EMB-312 Tucano G-BTUC 7th prototype used by Short for Tucano development, acquired 2001
- English Electric Canberra PR.9 XH131 acquired with a National Lottery grant in 2010
- Fairchild F-24W-41A Argus HB612 donated in 2012
- Fairey Gannet ECM.6/AS.4 XA460 acquired in 2011
- Fairey Swordfish II HS503 arrived in February 2026, donated by the RAF Museum
- Fieseler Fi.103 V-1 full-scale model BAPC.403 flying bomb acquired in 2010
- Fouga CM-170R-2 Magister ‘Super Magister 218 presented by Irish Air Corps 2021

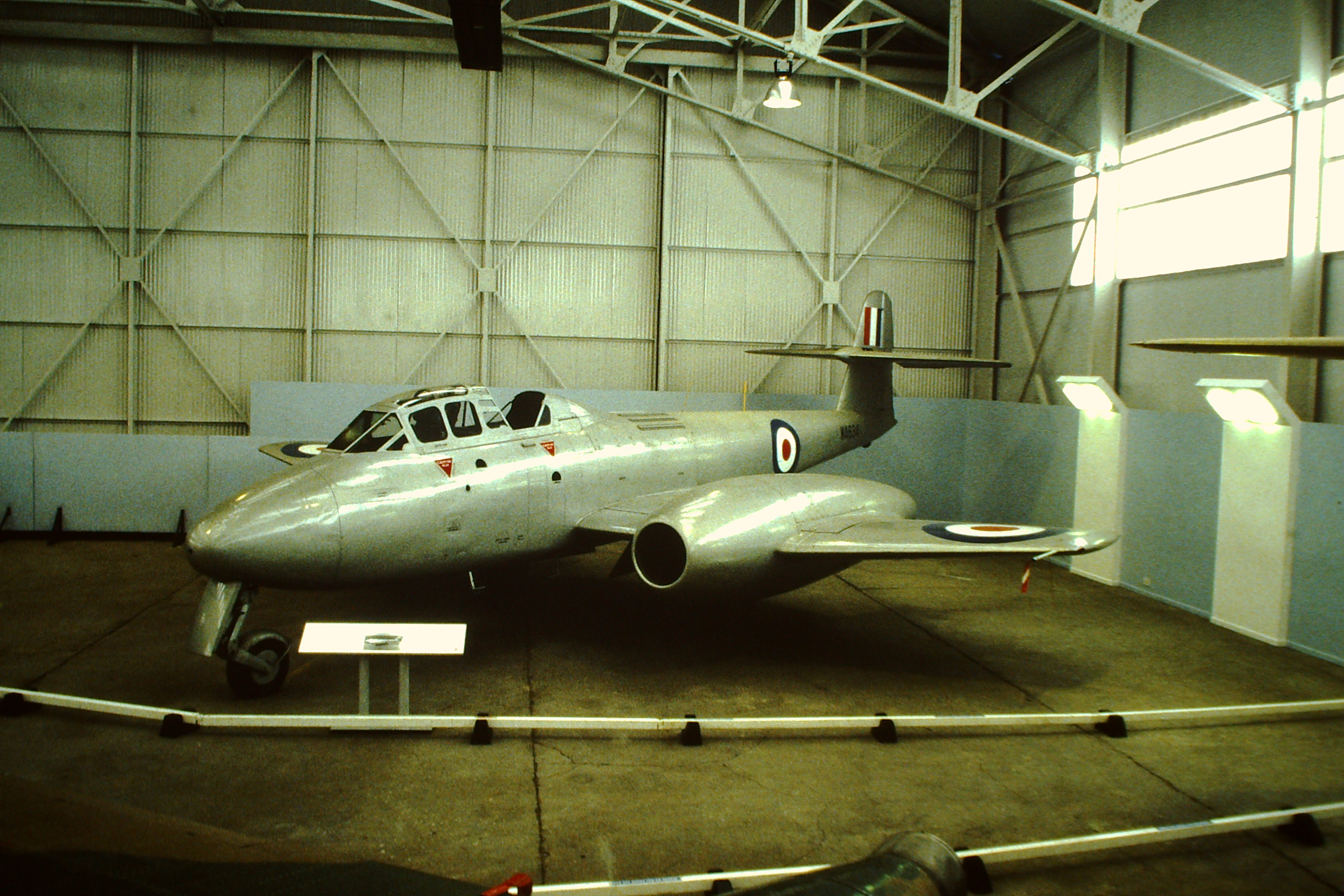
Gloster Meteor WA634 at Cosford in 2017

- Gloster Meteor T7.5 WA634 Martin-Baker ejection test aircraft gifted by RAF Museum 2022
- Grumman F4F Wildcat JV482 ditched in 1944, recovered in 1984
- Hawker Sea Hawk FB.5 WN108 donated by Short in 1989
- Hunting Jet Provost T.3A XM414 on loan from Castlereagh Borough Council since 2003
- McDonnell Douglas Phantom FG1/F-4K/M XT864 bought for £26,000 from the RAF in 2015
- Panavia Tornado GR.4 ZG771 donated by the RAF in 2021
- Percival Sea Prince T.1 WF122 acquired in 2017
- Reims FR.172H Reims Rocket 203 Irish Air Corps, arrived 2021
- Scottish Aviation Bulldog T.1 XX637 gifted to UAS 2019, marked as ‘XX613’
- SEPECAT Jaguar GR1 XZ389 gifted by the RAF in 2023
- Short SB.4 Sherpa G-14-1 arrived in 2008 on long-term loan from the Imperial War Museum
- Short SB.5 WG768 arrived 10 December 2025, donated by the RAF Museum Midlands
- Short SD.2 Stiletto supersonic target drone
- Short Tucano T.1 ZF378 marked as Spitfire 'P7832 Enniskillen', moved to UAS in late 2024
- Slingsby Cadet TX.1 XN239 arrived by 2022, glider, being restored elsewhere
- Supermarine Spitfire IIa Replica BAPC.369 marked as ‘P7823’ delivered to UAS 2013

Civil aircraft

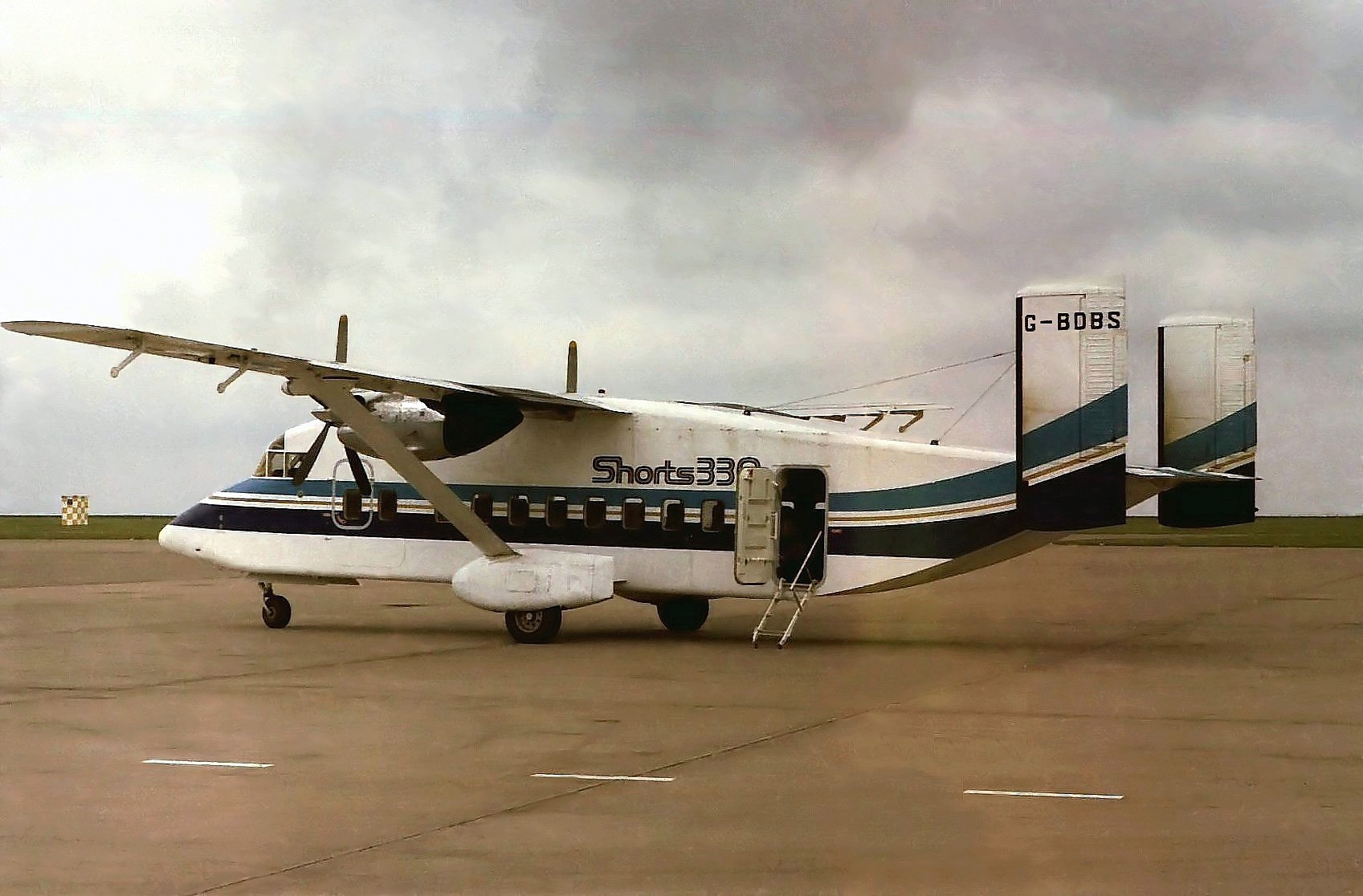
Short 330 G-BDBS in 1981

- Aero Composites (Lavery) Sea Hawker EI-BUO acquired in 1998
- Aerosport Scamp A unflown, unregistered, donated in 2013, false markings as ‘NI-UAS’
- Clutton-Tabenor FRED Series 2 G-BNZR donated to UAS in 2010
- Eipper Quicksilver acquired 2012
- Eurowing Goldwing G-MJWS donated in 2000
- Evans VP-2 G-BEHX donated, arrived 2016
- Ferguson Flyer 1911 Replica G-CJEN flew only once, in 2016, and arrived later that year
- HAPI SF-2A Cygnet unassembled kit, arrived 2013
- Monnett Monerai BGA.2988 marked as‘EVN’, glider arrived in 2017
- Rotec Rally 2B G-MBJV ultralight arrived 2013
- Short 330 G-BDBS donated by Short in 1992
- Team Himax 1700R G-MZHM acquired 2007

Rotorcraft

- Air & Space 18A EI-CNG autogyro arrived in 2012 on a "5-year loan"

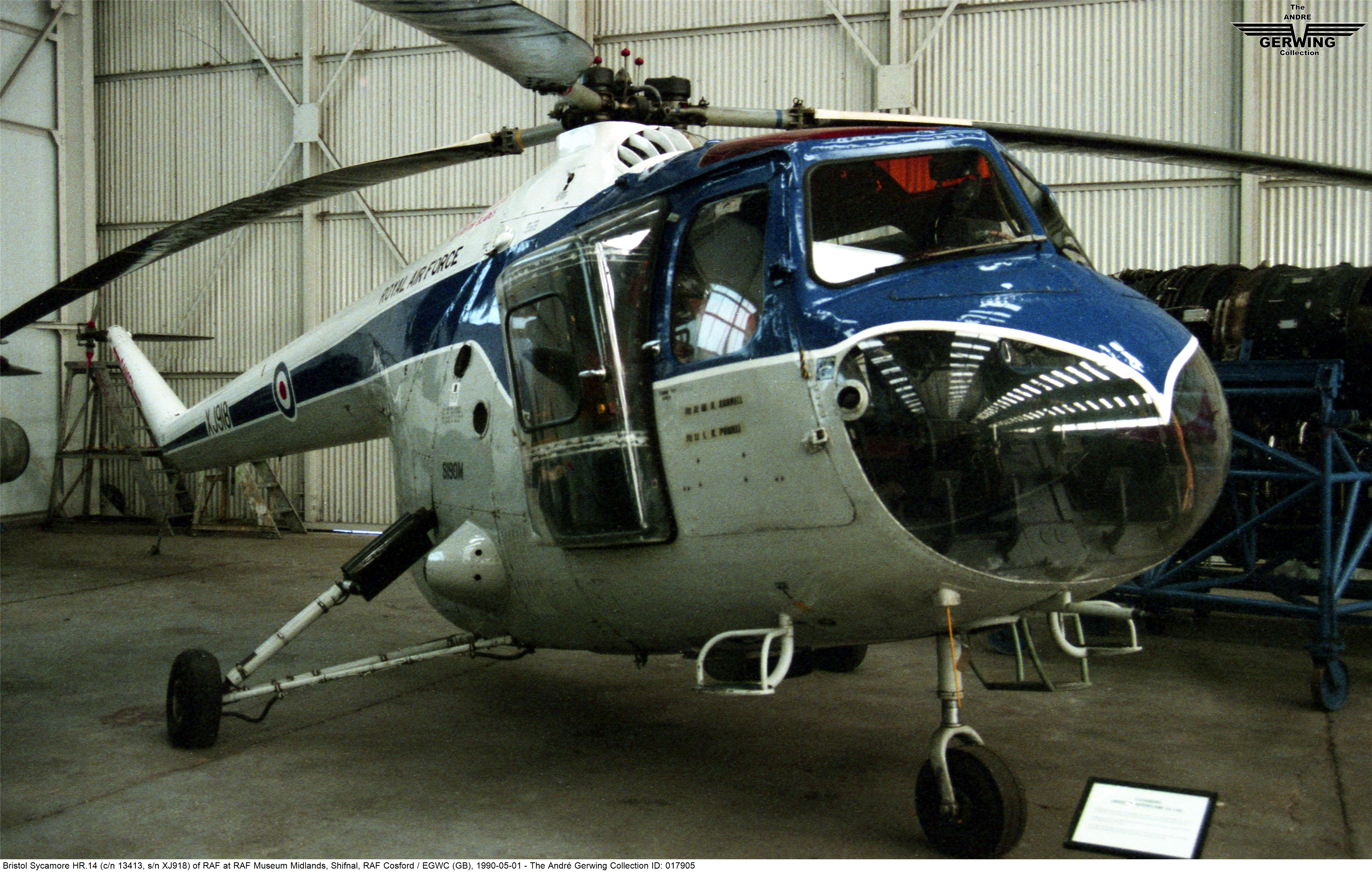
Bristol Sycamore XJ918 at its previous home in 1990

- Bristol Sycamore HR.14 XJ918 gifted from Royal Air Force Museum Midlands in 2022
- Robinson R22 G-RENT on loan to UAS since 2003
- Sud Aviation Alouette III 202 Irish Air Corps gifted in 2009
- Westland Gazelle AH.1 XZ332 to UAS 2024
- Westland Lynx AH.1 XZ666 arrived in 2024

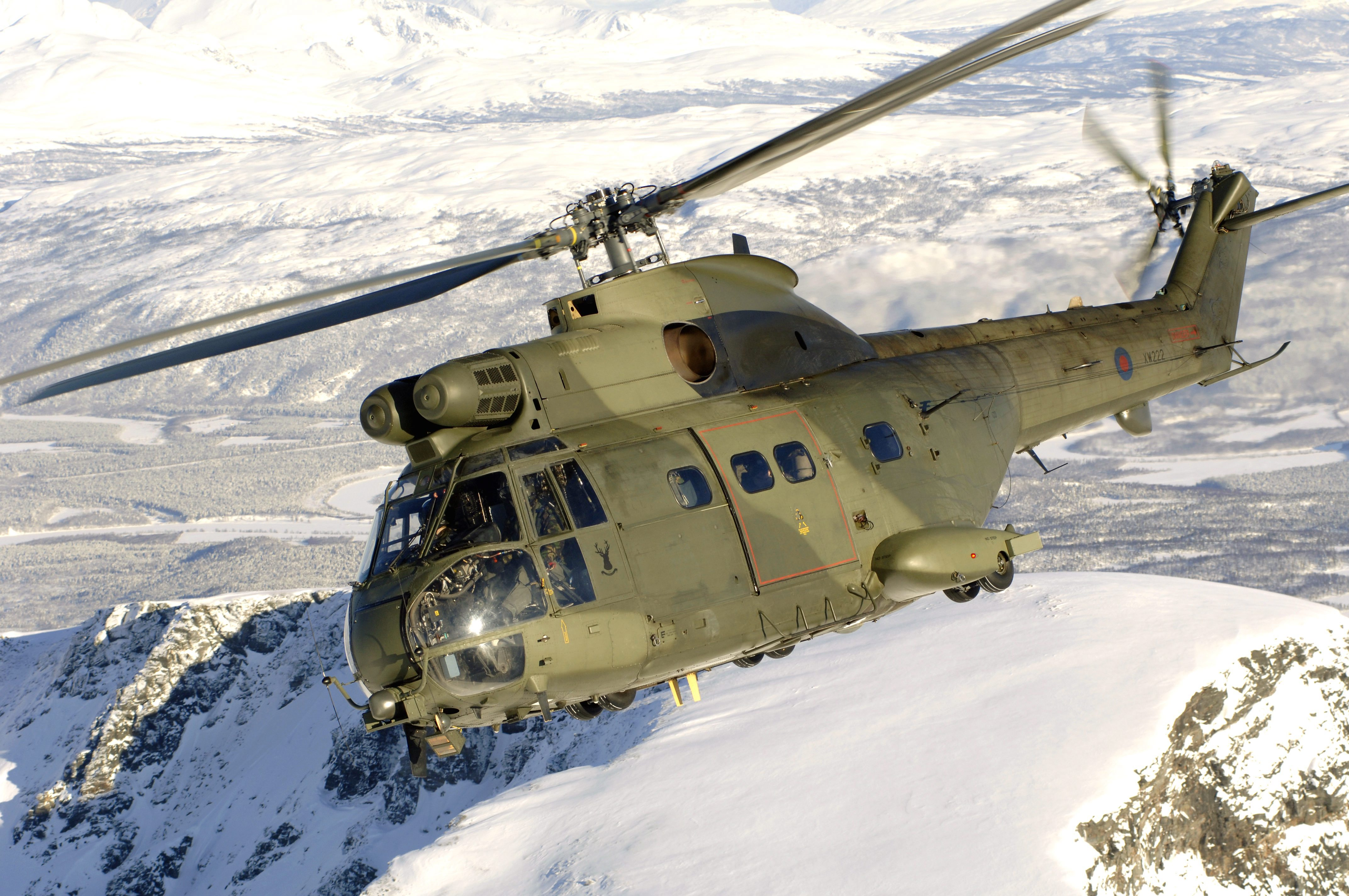
RAF Puma XW222 over Norway in 2006

- Westland Puma HC.1 XW222 arrived in 2014
- Westland Scout XV136 arrived in 2014
- Westland Wessex HC.2 XR517 acquired in 2004

Other aircraft

- Beagle A.61 Terrier G-AVCS ex WJ363, wreck arrived 2017
- Cameron N-90 G-TANK hot air balloon basket
- Chargus Cyclone BAPC.263 hang glider acquired in 1994
- Pitts S-1A Special N80BA crash wreckage donated in 2016
- Rogallo BAPC.266 hang glider acquired in 2000

Vehicles

- AEC Matador
- Bedford QL fuel bowser
- David Brown Tugmaster
- Ferguson TEA-20 Tractor
- Thornycroft Amazon Coles Crane

== See also ==
- List of aviation museums
