= Air & Space 18A =

American autogyro

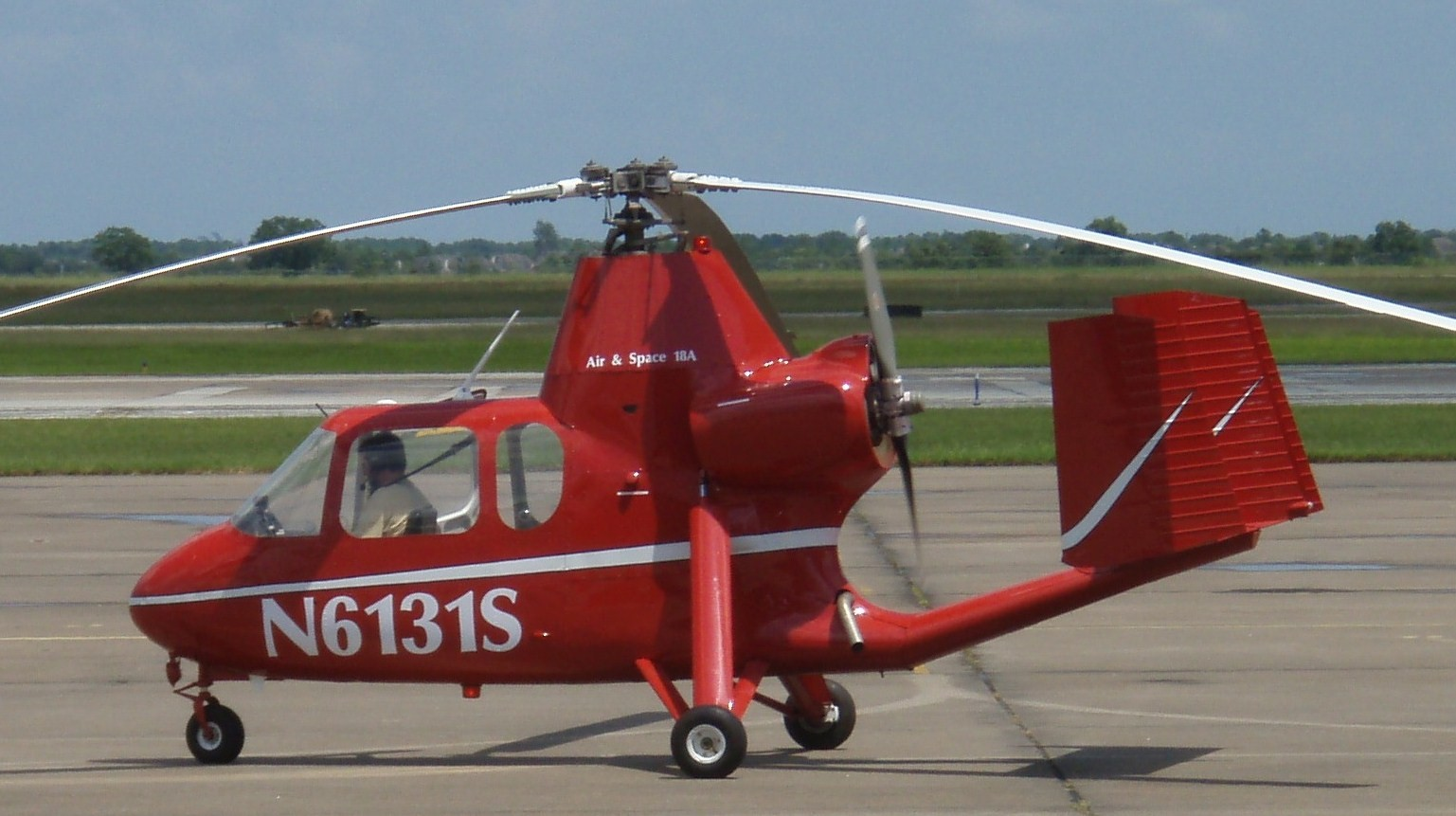

General information
- Type: Autogyro
- Manufacturer: Air and Space Manufacturing, Inc.
- Designer: Gilbert Devore
- Status: Out of production
- Number built: 68

History
- Manufactured: 1965–2000
- Introduction date: 1965
- First flight: 1964

The Air & Space 18A is a gyroplane that was manufactured in the central United States between 1965 and 2000.

The Air & Space 18A is one of the last three gyroplanes issued a Standard Airworthiness Certificate (September 1961) by the United States Federal Aviation Administration (FAA).

== Development ==
=== Umbaugh Aircraft Corporation ===
Raymond E. Umbaugh, a manufacturer of agricultural fertilizer, founded Umbaugh Aircraft Corporation in Ocala, Florida, in 1957 to develop a gyroplane based on experience he acquired while modifying single-seat Bensen Gyrocopters. Gilbert Devore commenced the design of Umbaugh's tandem two-seat jump-takeoff gyroplane in 1958, basing the rotor system on that of the Sznycer Omega BS-12 helicopter. The prototype Umbaugh U-17, built by Fairchild Engine and Airplane Corporation of Hagerstown, Maryland, flew in August 1959. Further test flights were conducted by chief pilot Ken Hayden and former Pitcairn Autogiro Company pilot Slim Soule. The majority of the testing of the aircraft was done at Bartow Air Base in Bartow, Fl. The prototype exhibited stability problems due to its single rudder and minimal T-tail horizontal stabilizer positioned on a boom behind the pusher propeller. The second prototype, named Umbaugh U-18, was fitted with a V-tail which also proved inadequate. The third empennage tested, also unsuccessfully, was a T-tail with two large vertical end plates on the horizontal tail plane. Sufficient stability was finally achieved by the use of two fixed vertical fins with a centrally mounted all-flying rudder, all mounted on a horizontal stabilizer. Umbaugh had by this time concluded an agreement for Fairchild Engine and Airplane Corporation to undertake final development and mass production of the U-18 as the “Flymobil.”

Fairchild built five development gyroplanes during 1960, one of which was used to gain FAA Approved Type Certificate 1H17 in September 1961. Umbaugh established a large network of dealers and distributors in the United States, upon whom he imposed minimum sales quotas to generate a large order backlog, but he experienced difficulty filling the orders due to inadequate manufacturing capability at Fairchild. Under pressure from the dealers, Umbaugh Aircraft Corporation ceased operations in 1962 and the agreement with Fairchild was terminated.

=== Air and Space Manufacturing Inc. ===
About one hundred Umbaugh dealers took over the assets of Umbaugh Aircraft Corporation and in 1964 established Air and Space Manufacturing, Inc., of Muncie, Indiana, to commence production. In early 1965, the FAA awarded the corporation a production certificate for the Air & Space Model 18A gyroplane, a model which had only minor differences from the Umbaugh U-18. By late 1965 sixty-eight gyroplanes had been completed and delivered, 14 more were near completion, some were later stolen when Air and Space Manufacturing was in receivership. Air and Space Manufacturing, Inc., was again faced with dealer pressure for aircraft and commenced efforts to raise $2.5 million for expansion. The fund raising resulted in accusations of stock irregularities by the U.S. Securities and Exchange Commission, and though those concerned were eventually cleared of all charges, the associated costs and delays resulted in the collapse of the company in 1966.

The assets of Air and Space Manufacturing went into storage, and were eventually (in the 1980s) acquired by one of the dealers, retired Pan Am pilot I. Don Farrington of Paducah, Kentucky. John Potter, the former Vice President of Air & Space Manufacturing, Inc., went into partnership with Farrington. Their company, Farrington Aircraft, worked on acquiring existing Air & Space 18A airframes as well as the type certificate. The company closed shortly after Farrington suffered a heart attack in April 2000 (while flying a gyroplane at an air show) and died a few days after the resulting crash.

Potter tried to re-establish the 18A program and transported an inventory of parts and some 18As to LaBelle, Florida, where he and partner Gene Ferrel established Heliplane Aircraft International Corp. Robert Kelsall of Euroa, Australia, was engaged to design a four-place version of the 18A termed 28A. Potter died of cancer in 2006.

Heliplane Aircraft International Corp. currently resides in Summerville, SC outside Charleston. Gene Ferrel owns the FAA Type II certificate for this aircraft, along with three trailers full of parts, fuselages and airframes. As of November 2011, no progress has been made placing the 18A back into production.

=== Farrington Aircraft Corp. ===
Initially lacking ownership of the type certificate, Farrington Aircraft Corporation remanufactured existing aircraft and also developed Supplemental Type Certificate (STC) modifications including:

- a collective pitch trim system to allow increased cruise speed,
- fiberglass engine cowlings and exhaust system to suppress the significant propeller and exhaust noise, and
- a yaw warning delay circuit system.

Farrington Aircraft Corporation also operated a gyroplane pilot training facility at Farrington Airpark, a privately owned, public-use airport in Paducah, Kentucky, and engaged in extensive promotional efforts.

=== Production by Air and Space America, Inc. ===
In 1991, Farrington obtained the Air & Space 18A Type Certificate, and undertook efforts to manufacture new gyroplanes as Air and Space America, Inc. with a selling price of $75,000. Work was also under way in 1996 to certify a Model 20A, fitted with a Lycoming IO-360 200 horsepower (150 kW) fuel-injected engine.

Farrington suffered a heart attack in April 2000 (while flying an Air and Space 18A at an airshow) and died a few days after the subsequent crash. Farrington Aircraft Corporation ceased operations shortly after, and the gyroplane assets were sold at auction.

=== Heliplane Aircraft Corporation International ===
Heliplane Aircraft Corporation International purchased the type certificate (TC) and assets and expressed an intent to start manufacturing the 18A by 2015. The TC was transferred on July 21, 2011 per FAA TCDS database. The TC along with several aircraft were moved to Fort Pierce, Florida; the owner of HACI was Eugene Ferrel. Plans to fit the 18A with a DeltaHawk 200 hp diesel engine never materialized beyond the planning stage and the company did little else. HACI filed for Chapter 11 Bankruptcy Protection on July 1, 2011. The Bankruptcy court converted the case to Chapter 7 and the type certificate and all assets were liquidated in a sale to TWMCC Leasing, LLC in which all creditors were paid in full and Mr Ferrel was kept on with the LLC as a paid consultant for several years.

=== Heliplane USA ===
Based on earlier writings, Thomas W McClelland formed Heliplane USA; this company is completely separate from and has no relationship with the leasing company which purchased the HACI assets out of bankruptcy.

=== TWMCC Leasing, LLC ===
Type Certificate 1H17, Rev 6 was transferred from Heliplane Aircraft Corporation International to TWMCC Leasing, LLC as of December 12, 2012 per FAA TCDS database search on March 26, 2021. The address associated with the TC record is still on Airman's Drive in Ft. Pierce, FL.

== Design ==
External videos
- Jump takeoff of A&S 18A

The 18A is a metal semi-monocoque construction with a tube frame supporting the transmission and engine. It has an enclosed cockpit with two tandem seats and a fixed tricycle landing gear. A 180 hp (134 kW) Lycoming O-360-A1D horizontally opposed carbureted engine is fitted behind the cockpit driving a two or three-bladed Hartzell pusher propeller. A three-bladed fully articulated rotor is mounted above and behind the cockpit. A hydraulically actuated clutch and a transmission are provided to permit the engine to drive the rotor briefly while on the ground to obtain the rotor speed necessary for takeoff. The clutch is released immediately prior to takeoff, and the rotor is not engine-driven in flight. The rotor can be pre-spun up to 370 rpm on the ground with the blades in flat pitch to store energy for take-off (flight rpm typically being in the low 200s). When the blades are released to flight pitch the aircraft can perform a "jump" or zero-roll take-off (aircraft load and density altitude permitting) using the excess energy in the blades.

== Aircraft on display ==
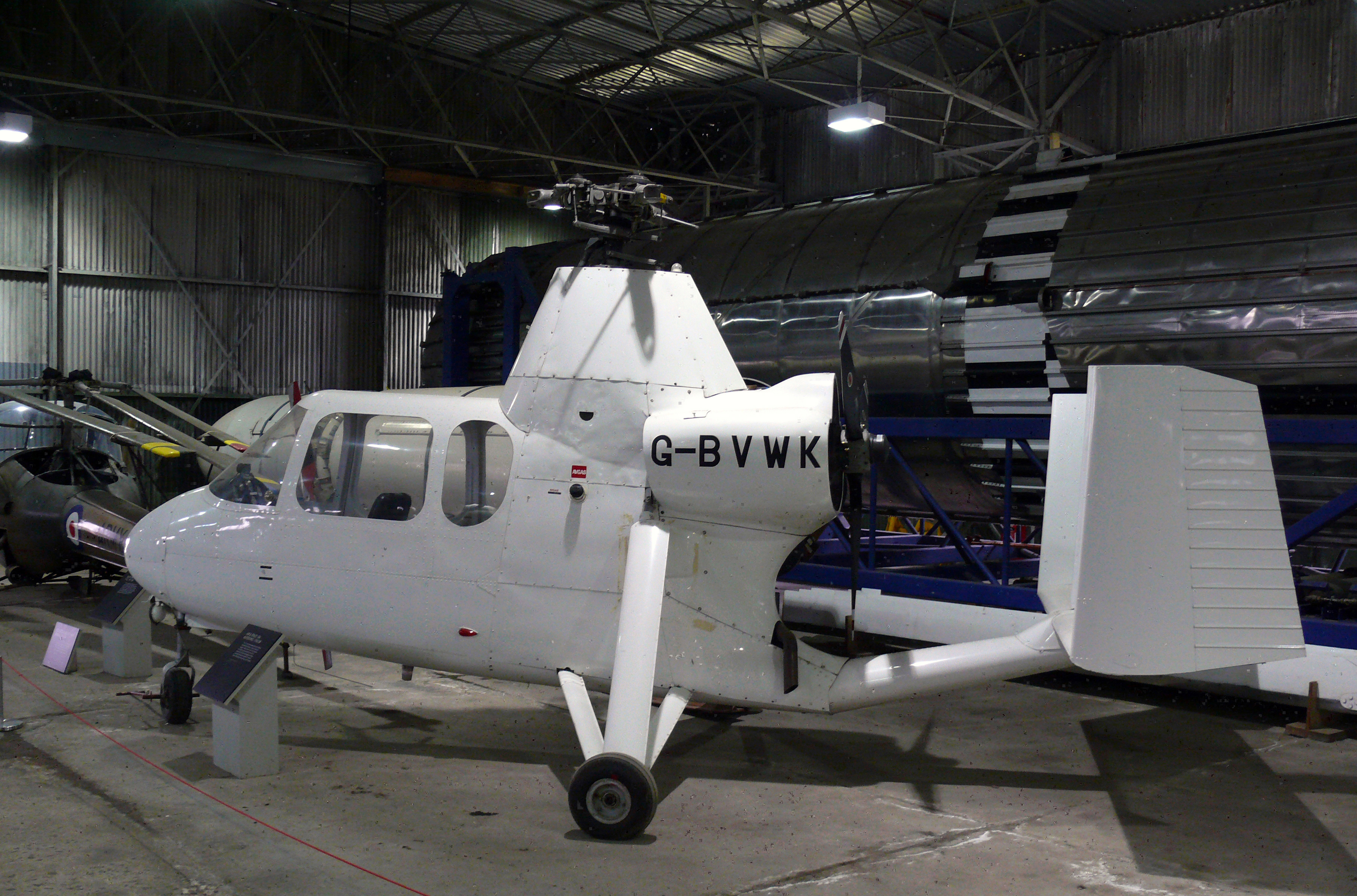
G-BVWK at the National Museum of Flight, Scotland

- 18-14 – G-BVWK – National Museum of Flight, East Fortune, Scotland
- 18-26 – D-HOBB – Hubschraubermuseum Bückeburg, Germany
- 18-38 – N6131S – Classic Rotors Museum, Ramona, California
- 18-59 – N6169S – Naval Air Station Wildwood Aviation Museum in Rio Grande, New Jersey
- 18-63 – G-BVWL – The Helicopter Museum, Weston-super-Mare, North Somerset, England
- 18-75 – EI-CNG – Ulster Aviation Society, Lisburn, Northern Ireland

== Specifications (18A) ==
Data from Jane's All The World's Aircraft 1966–67 and Report UER 18-600 FAA Approved Gyroplane Flight Manual, Revised Apr. 9, 1991

General characteristics

- Crew: one, pilot
- Capacity: one passenger
- Length: 19 ft 10 in (6.04 m)
- Wingspan: 35 ft 0 in (10.67 m)
- Height: 9 ft 3 in (2.82 m)
- Wing area: 963 sq ft (89.5 m^{2})
- Max takeoff weight: 1,800 lb (816 kg)
- Fuel capacity: 27.3 US gallons (108 L)
- Powerplant: 1 × Lycoming O-360-A1D air-cooled flat-four, 180 hp (135 kW)

Performance

- Maximum speed: 84 kn (97 mph, 156 km/h)
- Cruise speed: 70 kn (80 mph, 129 km/h)
- Range: 261 nmi (300 mi, 483 km)
- Service ceiling: 12,000 ft (3,660 m)
- Rate of climb: 710 ft/min (3.6 m/s)
