= Short SB.5 =

British research aircraft

SB5

General information
- Type: Experimental aircraft
- Manufacturer: Short Brothers
- Primary user: Royal Aircraft Establishment
- Number built: 1

History
- First flight: 2 December 1952
- Retired: 1967

The Short SB.5 (serial WG768) was a "highly unorthodox, adjustable wing" British research aircraft designed by Short Brothers in response to the UK Air Ministry requirement ER.100; to provide input for the design of the English Electric P.1 (prototype of the English Electric Lightning) by testing the low speed flight characteristics of various configurations of wing-sweep required for supersonic flight. The tailplane could be mounted either on top of the fin ("T-tail") or below the fuselage. The tests ultimately confirmed that the original P.1/Lightning design was an effective configuration for high speed flight.

== Design and development ==
A technical dispute arose between the Royal Aircraft Establishment and the English Electric Company (EEC) as to the optimum configuration for the company's proposed supersonic fighter. A single-seat, mid-winged research machine was built to investigate the low speed handling of the possible configurations. The same basic configuration of the P.1 was incorporated into a simpler testbed that had a fixed undercarriage. Since the SB5 was to test the low-speed flight characteristics, there was no requirement for the undercarriage to be retractable.

The contract was awarded to Short Brothers and Harland Ltd of Belfast on 2 August 1950. The machine was designed to allow three different wing sweep angles (50°, 60° and 69°). The sweep adjustment of the wings was made when the aircraft was on the ground. Two different tail plane positions (a) low on the rear fuselage and (b) on top of the fin, were also tested. "The complete rear fuselage, just aft of the engine, was detachable and two alternative rear fuselages were available, one with the tailplane set on top of the fin and the other with the tailplane set below the fuselage. The tailplane angle was adjustable in flight, being electrically actuated."

The wings were made "of plywood, except for light alloy sheeting at the leading and trailing edges," which restricted the maximimum speed to a modest 350 knots (400 mph; 650 km/h).

"Two 20 feet [6.1 m] circumference brake parachutes and one 20 feet [6.1 m] anti-spin parachute ... housed in the rear fuselage above the jet pipe."

The flight test report of the SB5 with 60 degrees of sweep and the tailplane in the lower position summarised the design criteria:

"At the time of the initial conception of the Short SB5 research aircraft (1949), it was recognised that the trend towards higher angles of sweepback was likely to continue, and this was emphasised by the existence of a design for an operational fighter aircraft, the English Electric P1 (Lightning), which was to have a sweepback of 60°. There was then no flight experience with wings of this amount of sweepback. The SB5 was designed to allow a gradual approach to this configuration, flying initially with 50° sweepback before conversion to 60° when it would resemble, aerodynamically, a seven-eighths scale model of the Lightning. To increase its usefulness as a research vehicle, the aircraft was capable of further modification to operate with 69° of wing sweepback."

== Operational testing ==
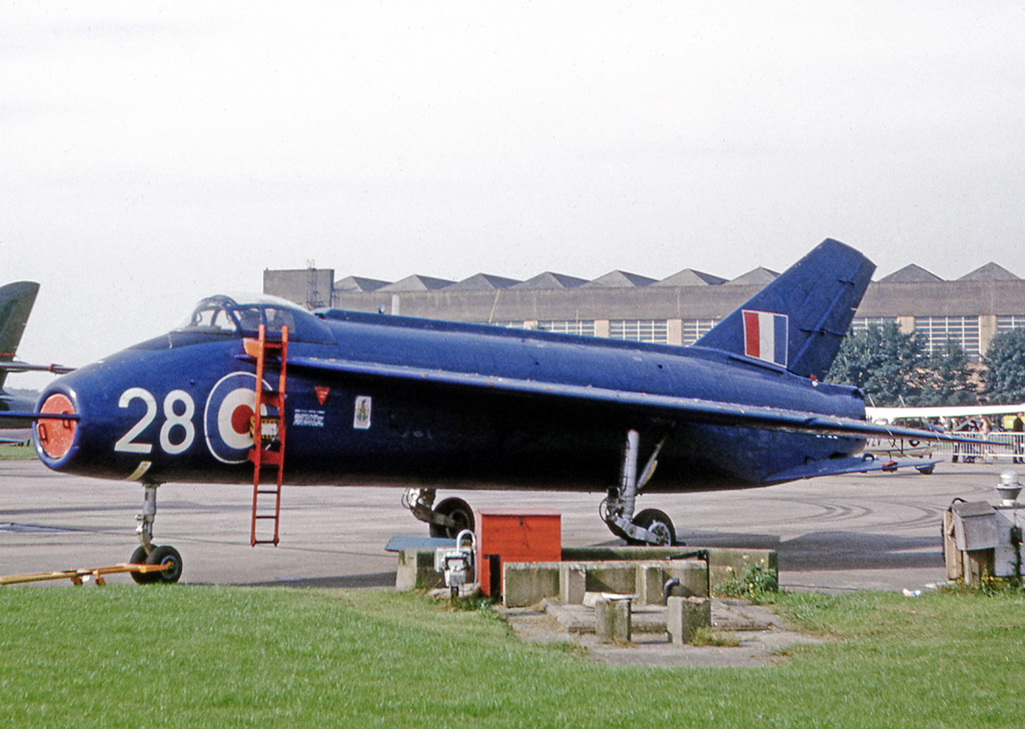
The Short SB.5 wearing the '28' code of the Empire Test Pilots School, on display at RAF Finningley, in 1969

Testing was conducted with increasing degrees of sweep and with the tailplane in both of its two possible positions. The first flight, with the sweep set to 50°, was made from Boscombe Down by the Chief Test Pilot of Shorts, Tom Brooke-Smith on 2 December 1952. In 1953, he gave an impressive display of the SB5's maneuverability and speed at the Society of British Aircraft Constructors Air Display at Farnborough.

In July 1953, the first test flights were carried out with the wing-sweep set to the intermediate angle of 60° and with the "T-tail." Testing with the lower tailplane position commenced in January 1954, so that flight-test feedback could be made available prior to the first flight of the P.1. It was eventually determined that the "T-tail" configuration was unsatisfactory. Testing in the 60° sweep configuration was completed in April 1958.

Before evaluating the final wing sweep configuration of 69°, a Martin-Baker ejection seat was fitted for the first time and the Rolls-Royce Derwent engine was changed for a Bristol Orpheus of greater thrust. The first flight, with the final sweep setting of 69° was made by Denis Tayler on 18 October 1960 at RAE Bedford; this was, at the time, the greatest degree of wing-sweep in the world.

The experience gained with the SB5 validated the wing-sweep and low tailplane configuration adopted for the P.1, which was to become the English Electric Lightning. Over eleven months, the tests with 50° and 60° sweep were concluded with the high tail configuration. In January 1954, the low tail rear fuselage was fitted and tests continued for a further two years and proved that the EEC configuration was correct.

After completion of its test programme, the SB5 eventually joined the fleet of the Empire Test Pilots' School (ETPS) at Farnborough in 1967, as is evidenced by the ETPS 25th Anniversary brochure in 1968. The Empire Test Pilots School flew the machine to give students experience in flight-testing "slender" aircraft.

The SB.5 was transferred to the Royal Air Force Museum Midlands, at Cosford in Shropshire, in 1974, where it was placed on display (with both of its tails). It was moved to the Ulster Aviation Society's museum at Long Kesh, Lisburn, Northern Ireland in December 2025.

== Operators ==
United Kingdom

- Royal Aircraft Establishment

== Specifications (Short SB.5- 1952 configuration (high tail)) ==
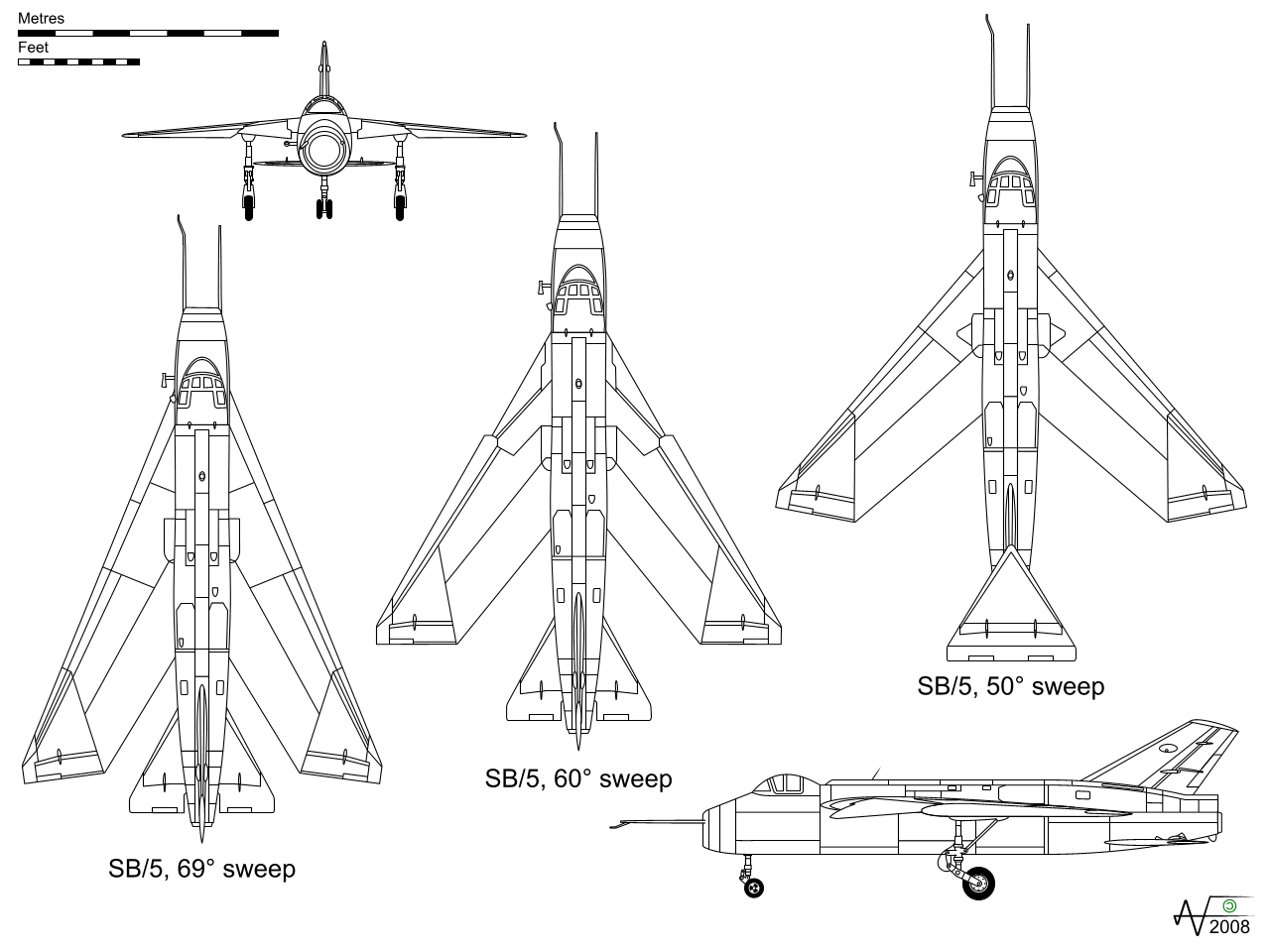
Orthographic projection of the SB.5, with 60° sweep. The plan views show the 69° sweep setting (left) and 50° (right).

Data from Jane's.

General characteristics

- Crew: 1
- Length: 45 ft 9 in (13.94 m)
- Wingspan: 35 ft 2 in (10.9 m)
- Height: 16 ft 7 in (5.05 m)
- Wing area: 330 sq ft (30.66 m^{2})
- Empty weight: 9,200 lb (4,173 kg)
- Gross weight: 12,000 lb (5,443 kg)
- Fuel capacity: 300 Imp. gallons
- Powerplant: 1 × Rolls-Royce Derwent Mk. 8 turbojet, 3,500 lbf (16 kN) thrust

Performance

- Maximum speed: 311 mph (500 km/h, 287 kn)

== See also ==
Related development:

- English Electric Lightning

Comparable aircraft:

- Handley-Page HP.115
- Saab 210

== Bibliography ==
- Buttler, Tony and Jean-Louis Delezenne. X-Planes of Europe: Secret Research Aircraft from the Golden Age 1946-1974. Manchester, UK: Hikoki Publications, 2012. ISBN 978-1-902-10921-3
- "SB5 and Swordfish for Ulster". Aeroplane. Vol. 54, no. 2. February 2026. p. 10. ISSN 0143-7240.
- Staples, K.J. "Tests on the Short SB5 with 60° and Low Tailplane - Part I- Forces and Moments". London: Office of Public Sector Information HMSO, 1969.
- Taylor, John W.R. Jane's Pocket Book of Research and Experimental Aircraft, London, Macdonald and Jane's Publishers Ltd, 1976. ISBN 0356 08409 4.
- Warner, Guy (July–August 2002). "From Bombay to Bombardier: Aircraft Production at Sydenham, Part One". Air Enthusiast. No. 100. pp. 13–24. ISSN 0143-5450.
- Winchester, Jim. X-Planes and Prototypes. London: Amber Books Ltd., 2005. ISBN 1-904687-40-7.
