= Farringdon's Battery =

Artillery battery

- Part of Fortifications of Gibraltar
- Upper Rock Nature Reserve, Gibraltar
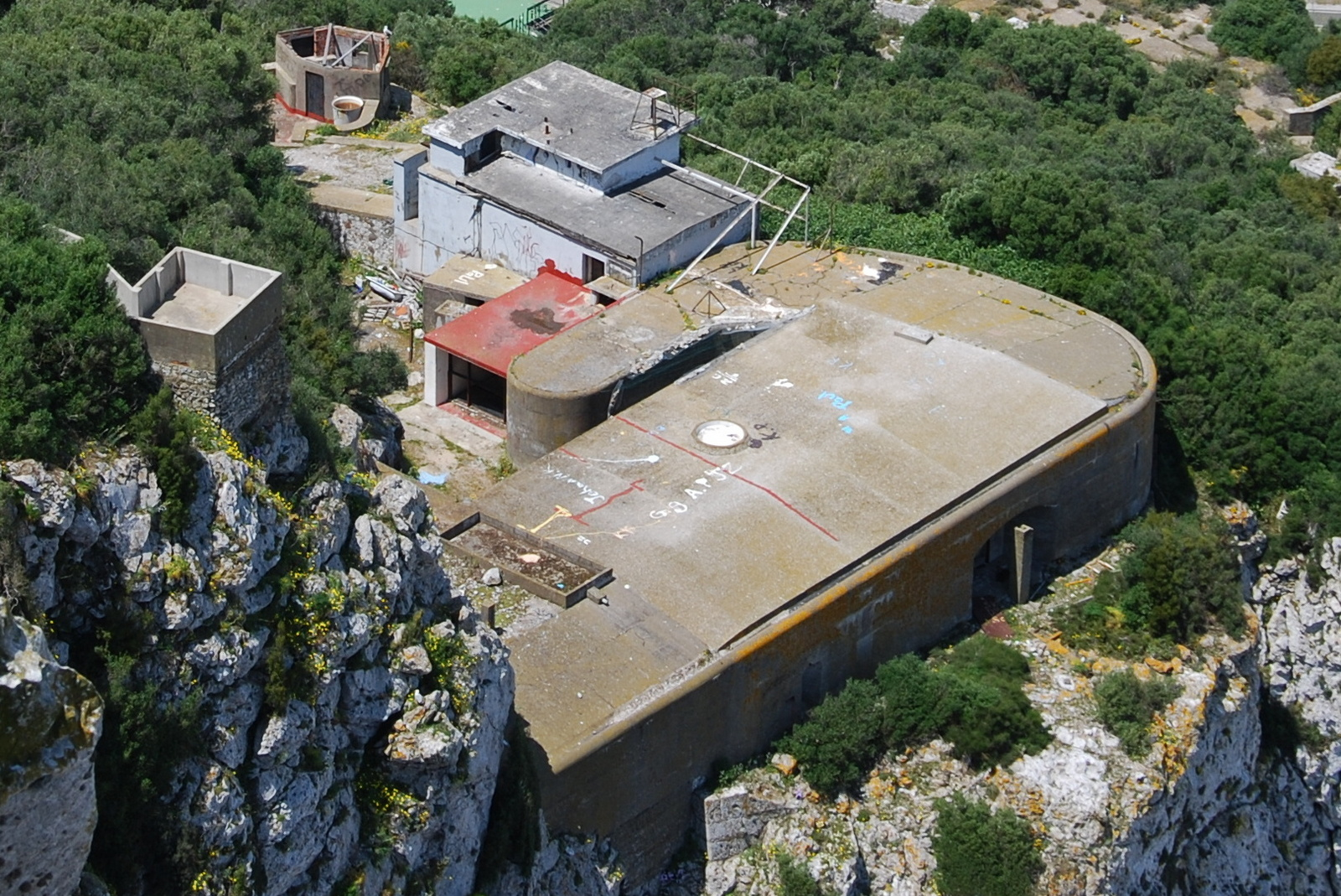
- Farrington's Battery

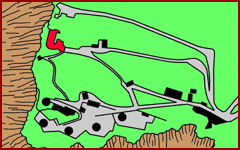
- Map showing location of Farringdon's Battery (top left, red) in Gibraltar in relation to Princess Royal's, Princess Anne's and Princess Amelia's Battery (bottom left).

Site information
- Type: Artillery battery
- Owner: Government of Gibraltar
- Open to the public: Yes
- Condition: Good

Location
- Coordinates: 36.145586°N 5.345504°W

Site history
- Battles/wars: Great Siege of Gibraltar, World War II

Farringdon's Battery (previously Willis' Battery) is an artillery battery in the British Overseas Territory of Gibraltar. Named after Sir Anthony Farrington, 1st Baronet, it is located above the north face of the Rock of Gibraltar within the Upper Rock Nature Reserve.

== History ==
The site of Willis' Hill on which Farringdon's Battery was built came to notice during the Thirteenth Siege of Gibraltar in 1727 when the Spanish besiegers attempted to mine under the British positions on the Rock in an attempt to blow them up. Their plan was unsuccessful as the Rock proved too difficult to mine with the technology available at the time and the siege ended before completing their plan, although the journal of that siege said the mine had been loaded.

This battery is first known to have been used during the Great Siege of Gibraltar which ran from 1779-83. The battery was named after Sir Anthony Farrington in 1790. Farrington was then a lieutenant-colonel in charge of the artillery on the Rock. Farrington only briefly held this position but he had also been in Gibraltar from 1759 to 1763 before he had left to fight in the American War of Independence. The battery's name seems to have been corrupted to be spelt with a "d" early on as John Drinkwater Bethune spells it this way in his A history of the late siege of Gibraltar in 1786.

By 1859 there were seven guns at this battery and in 1878 the battery was modified to take two 9 inch rifled muzzle-loading guns (RMLs). These guns were replaced by 10 inch RML guns in 1898 and remained in situ until 1906. It is likely that the 10 inch gun at Parson's Lodge Battery near Rosia Bay (which had been found lying in Princess Lines) was originally from Farringdon's Battery as this is the only recorded historic position of this type of gun in the area.

Modifications were made to the battery during the World War II and a fixed beam searchlight was installed in its right casemate to illuminate a fixed area on the rock face. Various concrete additions are thought to have also been constructed during this period.

== Today ==
Today the battery is still in good order and is listed with the Gibraltar Heritage Trust.

== Gallery ==
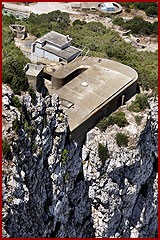

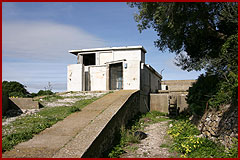

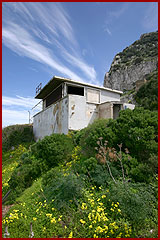

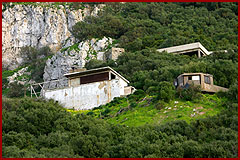

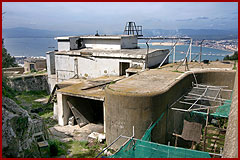
