= RAF Langford Lodge =

Former airfield in Northern Ireland

RAF Langford Lodge No. 20 Satellite Landing Ground
- Crumlin, County Antrim in Northern Ireland

Site information
- Type: Satellite Station
- Owner: Air Ministry
- Operator: Royal Air Force; United States Army Air Forces
- Controlled by: RAF Maintenance Command; RAF Flying Training Command

Location
- Shown within Northern Ireland RAF Langford Lodge (the United Kingdom)
- Coordinates: 54°37′10″N 6°18′00″W

Site history
- Built: 1941
- In use: 1941-1953
- Battles/wars: European theatre of World War II

Airfield information
- Elevation: 100 ft (30 m) AMSL
Runways
Direction	Length and surface
02/20	6,000 ft (1,800 m) Concrete
06/24	4,600 ft (1,400 m) Concrete

Langford Lodge Airfield is a former United States Army Air Forces and Royal Air Force station near Belfast, Northern Ireland. Today the airfield is owned by RLC (UK) a subsidiary of RLC Engineering Group which is headquartered in the Isle of Man. Langford Lodge is located on the eastern shores of Lough Neagh and close to RAF Aldergrove/Belfast International Airport and the former RAF Nutts Corner.

The site was also known as No. 20 Satellite Landing Ground.

== History ==
Planned to be a Satellite Landing Ground for No. 23 Maintenance Unit at RAF Aldergrove, Langford Lodge was selected in October 1941 to be developed as an air deport for the maintenance and repair of USAAF aircraft. A scheme was devised whereby the British Ministry of Aircraft Production would build the airfield and necessary facilities, while the American Lockheed Aircraft Corporation would staff the depot with civilian employees. Built during January-October 1942, and extended during the winter of 1943-44, the airfield eventually had two concrete runways, 26 pan hardstandings with 100 'fingers’ for aircraft storage, and nine T2, eight Robin and some 20 Butler hangars, plus a Lockheed-designed hangar.

Essentially, Langford Lodge was one of four primary air depots in the UK which during the period up to July 1944 when the contractual arrangements with Lockheed were terminated, provided complete logistical, ie supply and service back-up facilities to the USAAF, initially the 8th Air Force and then also the 12th, 9th and 15th Air Forces, albeit less extensively,. The other two, larger, depots were at Burtonwood and Warton in Lancashire but there were links between all three which were formalised by the setting up of a Base Air Depot Area organisation (BADA) in September 1943, at which time Langford Lodge was officially designated the 3rd Base Air Depot.

From July 1944 until its closure at the end of July 1945, the base functioned as a Storage and Experimental Station, continuing to do some of die work for which it had previously been responsible and, as the war moved towards a conclusion salvaging increasing numbers of war-weary aircraft. For a few months in 1944, Langford Lodge was also the base for Ferrying Squadrons of the 27*' Air Transport Group.

Following its closure in 1945, the airfield was placed in Care and Maintenance until 1952 when it was refurbished and used briefly to accommodate the RAF's No 5 Air Navigation School until its disbandment in January, 1953.

The following units were here at some point:

- No. 4 Air Navigation School RAF was formed here on 22 September 1952 but disbanded less than two months later on 15 November 1952
- No. 5 Air Navigation School RAF from 15 November 1952 until 31 January 1953 using Avro Ansons until it was disbanded
- Sub site of No. 257 Maintenance Unit RAF (March 1946– ?)

Langford Lodge was a target in Operation Grün (Ireland), a second front to Operation Sea Lion, which was the planned Nazi invasion of Britain. German paratroopers were to capture Langford Lodge, Aldergrove and Nutts Corner while RAF Long Kesh, Lisburn was to be destroyed.

Notably, on 2 March 1989 a Dan-Air BAe 748 from Newcastle, bound for Belfast International Airport, mistakenly landed at Langford Lodge.

Some of the wartime airfield facilities used to house the Ulster Aviation Society's Heritage Centre. Exhibits included a Blackburn Buccaneer, a Hawker Sea Hawk and a Westland Wessex. In 2005 the society moved to Maze Long Kesh, Lisburn.

== Today ==
Langford Lodge is currently home to two model flying clubs; Langford Model Aviation and Langford Model Heli Club.

There is a 6,200 feet (1,900 m) rocket sled track owned by Martin-Baker for ejection seat testing. The track, running alongside the old main runway, has been in use since 1971.

== See also ==
- List of former Royal Air Force stations
