= Farringdon =

Farringdon may refer to:

== People ==
- Nicholas de Farndone, 14th century Mayor of London

== Places ==
=== London ===
- Farringdon Road, a road in Clerkenwell, London
- Farringdon Street, an extension of Farringdon Road into the City of London
- Farringdon station, a railway station in Clerkenwell which takes its name from Farringdon Road
- Farringdon, London, an area of Clerkenwell which also takes its name from Farringdon Road
- Farringdon Within, a ward in the City of London
- Farringdon Without, a ward in the City of London

=== Other parts of the UK ===
- Farringdon, Devon
- Farringdon, Hampshire
- Farringdon, Sunderland
  - Farringdon Community Sports College, a school in Farringdon, Sunderland

=== Outside the UK ===
- Farringdon, New South Wales, a locality in Australia

== See also ==
- Faringdon, Oxfordshire, England
- Faringdon, New Zealand, suburb of Rolleston, Canterbury, New Zealand
- Farington (disambiguation)
- Farrington (disambiguation)
