= Farrington Twinstar =

American homebuilt gyroplane

Twinstar

General information
- Type: Autogyro
- National origin: United States
- Manufacturer: Farrington Aircraft
- Status: Production completed (2000)
- Number built: 12 (2015)

History
- First flight: 1993

The Farrington Twinstar is an American two-seat autogyro that was designed and produced by Farrington Aircraft of Paducah, Kentucky, a company owned by Don Farrington. Now out of production, when it was available the aircraft was supplied as a kit for amateur construction. It first flew in 1993.

== Design and development ==
The aircraft was designed to comply with the US Experimental - Amateur-built aircraft rules. It features a single main rotor, a two-seats-in tandem open cockpit with a windshield, tricycle landing gear without wheel pants, plus a tail caster. The tail consists of two vertical stabilizers and rudders. The acceptable power range is 120 to 180 hp (89 to 134 kW) and the standard engine used is a four-cylinder, air-cooled, four-stroke, dual-ignition 150 hp (112 kW) Lycoming O-320 in pusher configuration. The cabin width is 24 in (61 cm).

The aircraft fuselage is made from a combination of welded steel and bolted-together aluminum tubing, with a fiberglass cockpit fairing. Its two-bladed rotor has a diameter of 30 ft (9.1 m). The aircraft has a typical empty weight of 700 lb (320 kg) and a gross weight of 1,200 lb (540 kg), giving a useful load of 500 lb (230 kg). With full fuel of 20 U.S. gallons (76 L; 17 imp gal) the payload for the pilot, passengers and baggage is 380 lb (170 kg).

The standard day, sea level, no wind, take off with a 150 hp (112 kW) engine is 200 ft (61 m) and the landing roll is 50 ft (15 m).

The manufacturer estimated the construction time from the supplied kit as 200 hours.

== Operational history ==
By 1998 the company reported that 25 kits had been sold and five aircraft were completed and flying.

In March 2015 six examples were registered in the United States with the Federal Aviation Administration, although a total of 12 had been registered at one time.

== Specifications (Twinstar) ==
Data from Purdy, Brassey

General characteristics

- Crew: one
- Capacity: one passenger
- Length: 12 ft 0 in (3.66 m)
- Height: 8 ft 0 in (2.44 m)
- Empty weight: 700 lb (318 kg)
- Gross weight: 1,200 lb (544 kg)
- Fuel capacity: 20 U.S. gallons (76 L; 17 imp gal)
- Powerplant: 1 × Lycoming O-320 four cylinder, air-cooled, four stroke aircraft engine, 150-160 hp (112--119 kW)
- Main rotor diameter: 28 ft 0 in (8.53 m)
- Main rotor area: 706 sq ft (65.6 m^{2})
- Propellers: 2-bladed fixed pitch

Performance

- Maximum speed: 90 mph (145 km/h, 78 kn)
- Cruise speed: 65 mph (105 km/h, 56 kn)
- Range: 90 mi (145 km, 78 nmi)
- Service ceiling: 10,000 ft (3,050 m)
- Rate of climb: 1,000 ft/min (5.1 m/s)
- Disk loading: 1.7 lb/sq ft (8.3 kg/m^{2})

== See also ==
- List of rotorcraft
