= Farington (surname) =

Farington is a surname. Notable people with the surname include:

- Anthony Farington or Anthony Farindon (1598–1658), English royalist divine
- George Farington (1752–1788), English artist, brother of Joseph Farington
- Joseph Farington (1747–1821), English artist, brother of George Farington
- Sir Richard Farington, 1st Baronet (c. 1644–1719), English politician
