= John Farrington (Massachusetts politician) =

US politician (died 1843)

Deacon John Farrington was a member of the Great and General Court of Massachusetts. He died September 30, 1843. He was a descendant of John Farrington, one of the original settlers of Dedham, Wrentham, and Deerfield, Massachusetts.
