= John Farrington (Massachusetts colonist) =

American colonist

John Farrington was an early American colonist. He settled in Dedham, Massachusetts and served as a selectman there. His name first appears in the records of Dedham in 1651.

When the town of Wrentham separated, he became one of the first settlers there. Later, he would become one of the founders of Deerfield, Massachusetts. His wife, Mary Bullard, was the cousin of Quentin Stockwell's wife Abigail. The Stockwells were also original settlers of Deerfield. He was the ancestor of Representative John Farrington.

A handmill likely brought over from England by Farrington is today in the collection of the Dedham Museum and Archive.

== Works cited ==
- Neiswander, Judith (2024). Mother Brook and the Mills of East Dedham. Damianos Publishing. ISBN 978-1-941573-66-2.
- Farrington, Daniel (1899). Farrington Memorial: A Sketch of the Ancestors and Descendants of Dea. John Farrington ... to which is Appended the Genealogy of His Wife, Cynthia Hawes. Committee.
- Worthington, Erastus (1827). The history of Dedham: from the beginning of its settlement, in September 1635, to May 1827. Dutton and Wentworth.
- Hanson, Robert Brand (1976). Dedham, Massachusetts, 1635-1890. Dedham Historical Society.
- Andrews, Herbert Cornelius; Hinsdale, Sanford Charles (1906). Hinsdale genealogy: descendants of Robert Hinsdale of Dedham, Medfield, Hadley and Deerfield, with an account of the French family of De Hinnisdal (Public domain ed.). A. H. Andrews. p. 208.
