= Anthony Farrington =

General Sir Anthony Farrington Bt
- Born: 6 February 1742; Nova Scotia
- Died: 3 November 1823 (aged 81); Blackheath, London
- Education: Royal Military Academy, Woolwich
- Spouse: Elizabeth Colden (after 1766)
- Military career
- Allegiance: United Kingdom
- Branch: British Army
- Service years: 1754–1823
- Rank: General
- Unit: Royal Artillery
- Commands: Royal Arsenal
- Conflicts: American Revolutionary War; French Revolutionary Wars

General Sir Anthony Farrington, 1st Baronet (6 February 1742 – 3 November 1823) was a British Army officer of the Royal Artillery. He served in Gibraltar and in the American War of Independence.

== Early life ==
Farrington was born on 6 February 1742. He was the son of Lieutenant-colonel Charles Farrington, who entered the Royal Artillery as a matross in 1733, and Ann (née Crouche) Farrington. His maternal grandfather was Anthony Crouche.

He entered the Royal Military Academy, Woolwich, as a cadet on 3 March 1754, was appointed a lieutenant fireworker in 1755, and a second lieutenant the following year.

== Career ==
Farrington became a lieutenant-colonel in December 1782, colonel 1791, major-general 1795, lieutenant-general 1802 and a general in 1812. He served at Gibraltar from 1759 to 63 where he was promoted to captain-lieutenant, and at New York and elsewhere in America 1764–8 where he became a captain. Returning to New York in 1773, he continued to serve in America until May 1783. He was at Boston in 1774–76 including the Battle of Bunker's Hill, Brooklyn, Long Island, White Plains, the Battle of Brandywine, during the American War of Independence. He commanded the artillery at Plymouth in 1788–89.

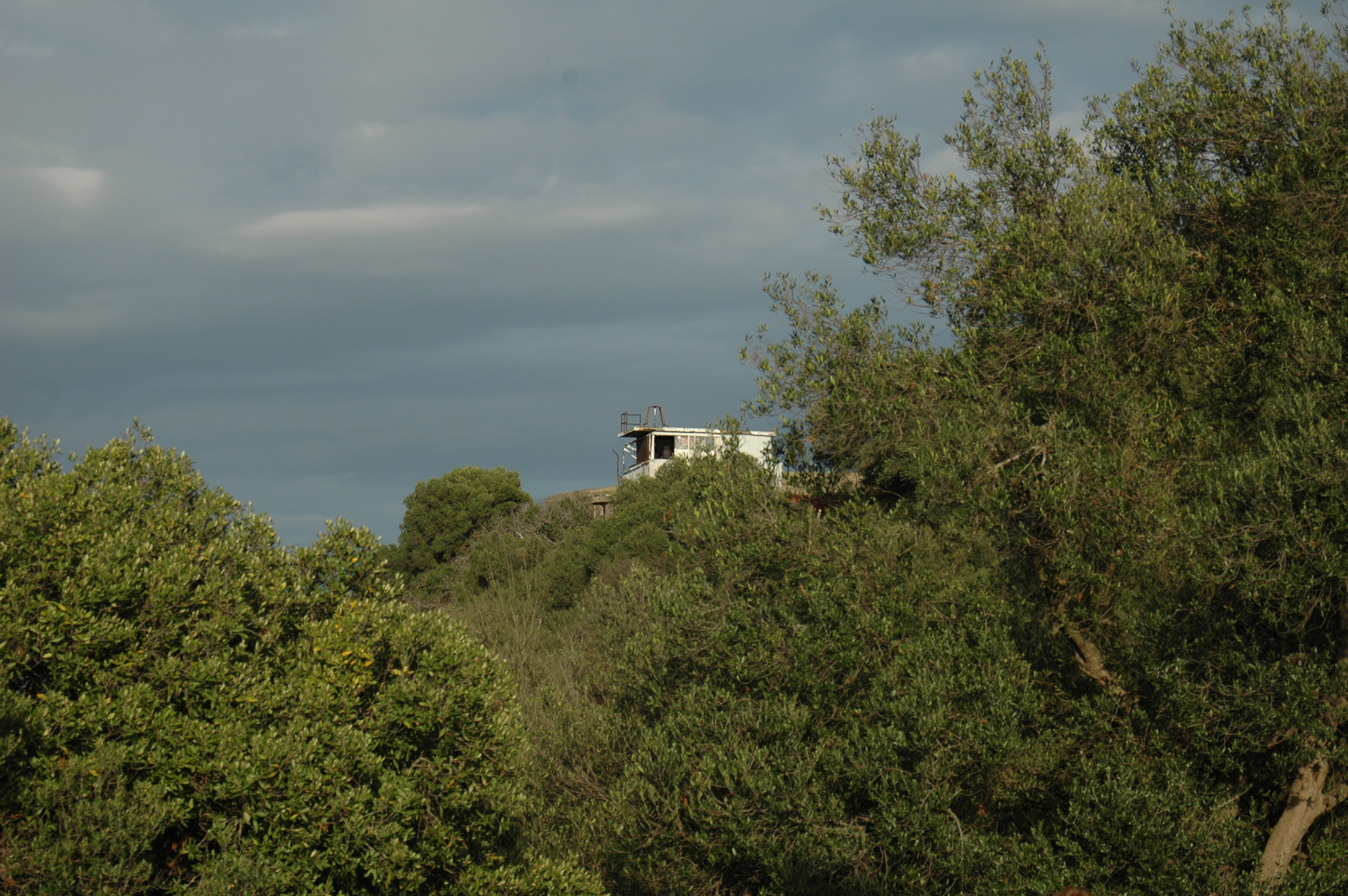
Farringdon's Battery

He was at Gibraltar in 1790–91 and there is a fortification there called Farrington's Battery that was named after him, although the spelling has now changed. He was commandant at Woolwich from 1794 to 1797, and he commanded the artillery of the expedition to The Helder, under the Duke of York, in September 1799. On his return he was shipwrecked off Yarmouth.

Farrington was appointed commandant of the field-train department in 1802, and in 1805 president of a select committee of artillery officers. In 1805. he was appointed inspector-general of artillery with the rank and style of director of the field-train department of the ordnance.

=== Honors ===
On 2 December 1818, Farrington was created a baronet in recognition of his services. In 1820, the University of Oxford gave him the honorary degree of D.C.L after sixty-eight years of military service.

== Personal life ==
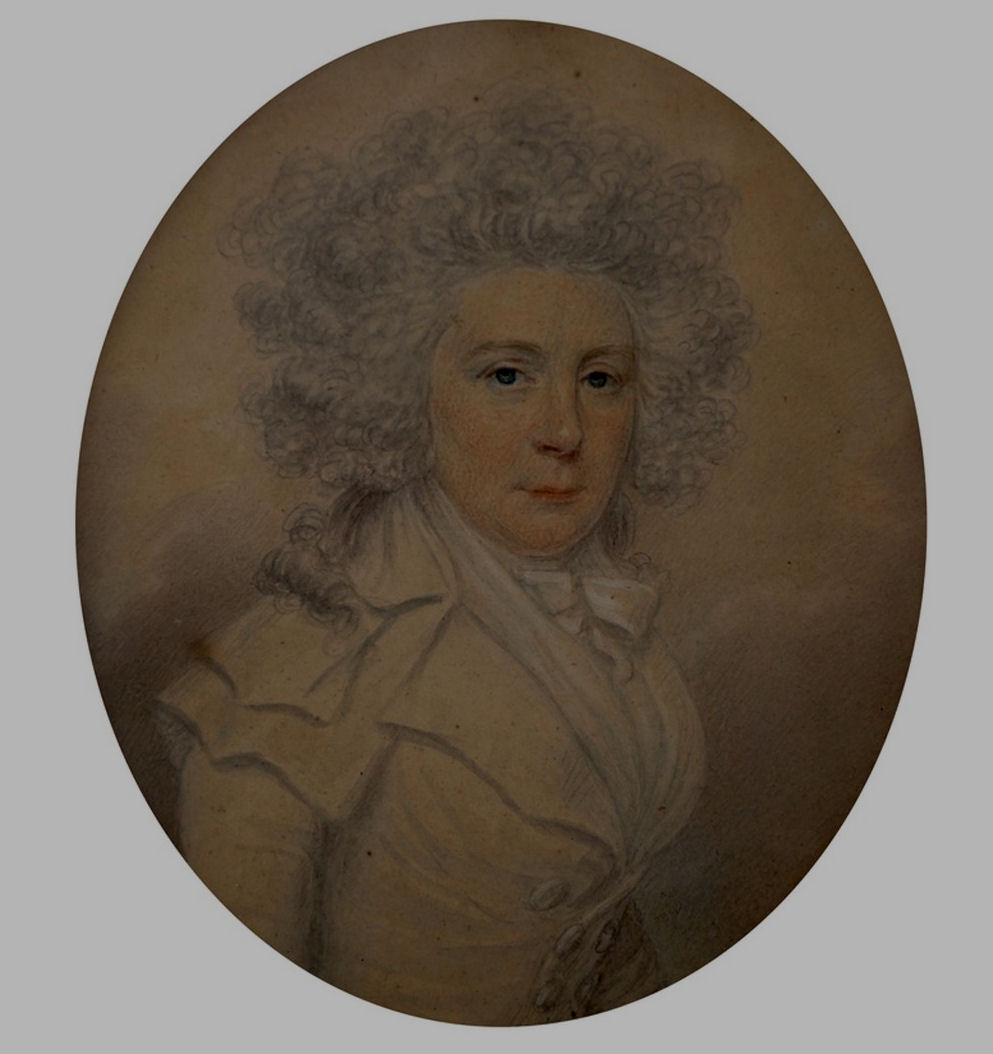
Elizabeth Colden, portrait by Henry Stubble

On 9 March 1766, he was married to Elizabeth Colden from New York. Elizabeth was the daughter of Alexander Colden and a granddaughter of Cadwallader Colden, the acting Colonial governor of New York. They had two sons and three daughters, including:

- Elizabeth Anne Farrington, who married Capt. James Gilbert in 1798.
- Harriet Farrington (d. 1838), who married Lt. Gen. Walter Cliffe in 1794.
- Mary Sophia Farrington (d. 1860), who married Maj. Gen. Loftus Owen in 1824.
- Charles Colden Farrington (1770–1796), who married Caroline Boland.
- Henry Maturin Farrington (1778–1834), who married four times and became the 3rd Baronet in 1828.

Farrington died on 3 November 1823, at his home in Blackheath.

=== Descendants ===
Through his daughter Harriet, he was a grandfather of Anthony Loftus Cliffe, the High Sheriff of Wexford in 1897.

Through his son Charles, who died a captain in the Duke of Wellington's Regiment, he was a grandfather of Charles Henry Farrington (1794–1828), who became a captain in the 31st Regiment of Foot, and succeeded to the baronetcy on the death of his grandfather in 1823. The 2nd Baronet, who fought in the Battle of Talavera and the Battle of Waterloo, died in India, unmarried, at age thirty-three.

Baronetage of the United Kingdom
New creation	Baronet (of Blackheath); 1818–1823	Succeeded by Sir Charles Henry Farrington
