= Thomas Farrington =

Thomas Farrington may refer to:

- Thomas Farrington (British Army officer) (1664–1712), British Army officer and politician
- Thomas Farrington (died 1758), British politician
- Thomas Farrington (American politician) (1798–1872), American lawyer and politician
