= George Farrington =

English footballer

Personal information
- Full name: George Farrington
- Date of birth: 12 June 1882
- Place of birth: Burslem, England
- Date of death: 1960 (aged 77–78)
- Position: Centre forward

Senior career*
Years	Team	Apps	(Gls)
1900–1901	Smallthorne		
1901–1902	Hanley Swifts		
1902–1903	West Bromwich Albion	0	(0)
1903–1904	Stoke Priory		
1904–1905	Smallthorne		
1906–1907	Preston North End	2	(0)
1907–1911	Smallthorne		
1911	Leek United		
1912	Leek Alexandra		
Total		2	(0)
- * Club domestic league appearances and goals

George Farrington (12 June 1882 – 1960) was an English footballer who played in the Football League for Preston North End.
