= Farrington Aircraft =

American homebuilt aircraft manufacturer

Farrington Aircraft Corporation
- Type: Privately held company
- Industry: Aerospace
- Founder: Don Farrington
- Defunct: 2000
- Fate: Wound up after death of founder
- Headquarters: Paducah, Kentucky, United States
- Products: Kit aircraft

The Farrington Aircraft Corporation was an American aircraft manufacturer founded by Don Farrington and based in Paducah, Kentucky. The company specialized in the design and manufacture of autogyros in the form of kits for amateur construction.

The company produced the open-cockpit, two-seat Farrington Twinstar, selling 25 kits, of which about 12 were completed and flown. The Farrington 18A was a kit version of the Air & Space 18A production autogyro, of which 20 were completed and flown.

Don Farrington died on 23 April 2000 following an accident with the Air & Space 18A gyroplane he was flying on 13 April 2000 and subsequently the company was wound up.

== Aircraft ==
Summary of aircraft built by Farrington Aircraft
Model name	First flight	Number built	Type
Farrington Twinstar	late 1990s	12	Two seat open-cockpit autogyro
Farrington 18A		20	Two seat enclosed-cockpit autogyro
