= Don Farrington =

American pilot

Ira Donald “Don” Farrington (died 23 April 2000) was an American pilot and aviation entrepreneur famous for his knowledge of gyroplanes.

His company, Farrington Aircraft, produced the Farrington 18A and Farrington Twinstar. gyroplanes.

On 13 April 2000 Farrington crashed while at the controls of an Air & Space 18A gyroplane. The NTSB investigation (# MIA00LA133) found no evidence of mechanical malfunction and listed the cause as "the pilot's in-flight loss of control while maneuvering for undetermined reasons resulting in an uncontrolled descent and subsequent in-flight collision with terrain." He had been having heart issues suggestive of myocardial ischemia, but had not reported these in his FAA pilot medical.
