= Farrington baronets =

Title in the UK

- Escutcheon of the Farrington Baronets of Blackheath
- Creation date: 1818
- Created by: George III
- Peerage: Peerage of the United Kingdom
- Status: extant
- Motto: Le bon temps viendra, There's a good time coming

The Farrington Baronetcy, of Blackheath in the County of Kent, is a title in the Baronetage of the United Kingdom. It was created on 2 December 1818 for General Sir Anthony Farrington, 1st Baronet.

== Farrington baronets of Blackheath (1818) ==
- Sir Anthony Farrington, 1st Baronet (1742–1823)
- Sir Charles Henry Farrington, 2nd Baronet (1794–1828)
- Sir Henry Maturin Farrington, 3rd Baronet (1778–1834)
- Sir Henry Anthony Farrington, 4th Baronet (1811–1888)
- Sir William Hicks Farrington, 5th Baronet (1838–1901)
- Sir Henry Anthony Farrington, 6th Baronet (1871–1944)
- Sir Henry Francis Colden Farrington, 7th Baronet (1914–2004)
- Sir Henry William Farrington, 8th Baronet (born 1951)

The heir apparent to the baronetcy is Henry John Albert Farrington (born 1985), eldest son of the 8th Baronet.

== Notes ==
Baronetage of the United Kingdom
Preceded by Johnson baronets	Farrington baronets of Blackheath; 3 December 1818	Succeeded by Calvert baronets
