= William Farrington (soldier) =

English soldier and diplomat

Sir William Farrington (fl. 1412), was an English soldier and diplomat.

Farrington was from a well-known Lancashire family. He was knighted by the Duke of Lancaster before the battle of Nájera, 1366. During the decline of the English power in Aquitaine he there held several important military commands. He made an unsuccessful attempt to come to the assistance of the Earl of Pembroke in the sea-fight at La Rochelle. Having become governor at Saintes, he was in the fight at Soubise, where he narrowly escaped being made prisoner. Being obliged to abandon Saintes, he joined the forces under the command of Sir Thomas Felton, who went to relieve the town of Thouars, then besieged by the French. He subsequently joined the Duke of Buckingham, and distinguished himself during the campaign by several feats of arms. In 1376 he was named one of the guardians of the truce concluded with the French. The son of the Count Denia, one of the prisoners taken at the battle of Nájera, having managed to escape, Farrington was imprisoned with others in the Tower, as being therein guilty of negligence, and released by request of Henry Percy, earl of Northumberland, 1377.

In 1381 he was charged by royal order to assist at a duel in the Scotch marches, fought between Sir John Chatto, a Scotch knight, and Sir William Badby. He seems to have taken part in the crusade led by the Bishop of Norwich to assert the supremacy of Pope Urban over Clement, both of whom were claimants to the papal chair at this period. According to Rymer he was obliged to pay into the treasury a fine of fourteen hundred francs in gold for having taken part in the quarrel. He was sent on a mission to Philip van Arteveld in Flanders. Having stopped at Calais, he there received and brought to England the news of the battle of Rossebeke, 1382, fought between the French and the Flemings, led by Van Arteveld, in which the latter were defeated and their leader slain. He was at the battle of Dunkirk, and was besieged in Bourbourg. He was also with the Duke of Lancaster in Galicia. He was sent by Richard II on a special mission to Portugal, and his name is mentioned in the charter of 4 June 1390 among the principal personages then at the Portuguese court. He was also sent by Henry IV, shortly after his accession, on a mission to Paris, where he was not very favourably received. In 1403 Henry IV gave him the command of the castle of Fronsac, on the Dordogne, near Livourne.

In terms of a royal edict dated 19 October 1404 he was charged with the direction of all the sea traffic between England and the neighbourhood of Bordeaux. His duty was to see that all English ships engaged in trading between the two countries were duly despatched with their crews. In 1409 the exercise of these functions led him into a dispute with Jean Bordin, chancellor of Guyenne. In 1412 he was commander of the castle of Bordeaux.
